= List of cities and towns in Russia =

This is a list of cities and towns in Russia. According to the data of 2010 Russian Census, there are 1,117 cities and towns in Russia. After the Census, Innopolis, a town in the Republic of Tatarstan, was established in 2012 and granted town status in 2015.

== List ==
City	Russian name	Federal subject
Abakan	Абакан	Republic of Khakassia
Abaza	Абаза	Republic of Khakassia
Abdulino	Абдулино	Orenburg Oblast
Abinsk	Абинск	Krasnodar Krai
Achinsk	Ачинск	Krasnoyarsk Krai
Adygeysk	Адыгейск	Republic of Adygea
Agidel	Агидель	Republic of Bashkortostan
Agryz	Агрыз	Republic of Tatarstan
Ak-Dovurak	Ак-Довурак	Tuva Republic
Akhtubinsk	Ахтубинск	Astrakhan Oblast
Aksay	Аксай	Rostov Oblast
Alagir	Алагир	Republic of North Ossetia–Alania
Alapayevsk	Алапаевск	Sverdlovsk Oblast
Alatyr	Алатырь	Chuvash Republic
Aldan	Алдан	Sakha Republic
Aleksin	Алексин	Tula Oblast
Alexandrov	Александров	Vladimir Oblast
Alexandrovsk	Александровск	Perm Krai
Alexandrovsk-Sakhalinsky	Александровск-Сахалинский	Sakhalin Oblast
Alexeyevka	Алексеевка	Belgorod Oblast
Aleysk	Алейск	Altai Krai
Almetyevsk	Альметьевск	Republic of Tatarstan
Alupka	Алупка	Republic of Crimea
Alzamay	Алзамай	Irkutsk Oblast
Amursk	Амурск	Khabarovsk Krai
Anadyr	Анадырь	Chukotka Autonomous Okrug
Anapa	Анапа	Krasnodar Krai
Andreapol	Андреаполь	Tver Oblast
Angarsk	Ангарск	Irkutsk Oblast
Aniva	Анива	Sakhalin Oblast
Anzhero-Sudzhensk	Анжеро-Судженск	Kemerovo Oblast
Apatity	Апатиты	Murmansk Oblast
Aprelevka	Апрелевка	Moscow Oblast
Apsheronsk	Апшеронск	Krasnodar Krai
Aramil	Арамиль	Sverdlovsk Oblast
Ardatov	Ардатов	Republic of Mordovia
Ardon	Ардон	Republic of North Ossetia–Alania
Argun	Аргун	Chechen Republic
Arkadak	Аркадак	Saratov Oblast
Arkhangelsk	Архангельск	Arkhangelsk Oblast
Armavir	Армавир	Krasnodar Krai
Armiansk	Армянск	Republic of Crimea
Arsenyev	Арсеньев	Primorsky Krai
Arsk	Арск	Republic of Tatarstan
Artyom	Артём	Primorsky Krai
Artyomovsk	Артёмовск	Krasnoyarsk Krai
Artyomovsky	Артёмовский	Sverdlovsk Oblast
Arzamas	Арзамас	Nizhny Novgorod Oblast
Asbest	Асбест	Sverdlovsk Oblast
Asha	Аша	Chelyabinsk Oblast
Asino	Асино	Tomsk Oblast
Astrakhan	Астрахань	Astrakhan Oblast
Atkarsk	Аткарск	Saratov Oblast
Aznakayevo	Азнакаево	Republic of Tatarstan
Azov	Азов	Rostov Oblast
Babayevo	Бабаево	Vologda Oblast
Babushkin	Бабушкин	Republic of Buryatia
Bagrationovsk	Багратионовск	Kaliningrad Oblast
Bakal	Бакал	Chelyabinsk Oblast
Baksan	Баксан	Kabardino-Balkar Republic
Balabanovo	Балабаново	Kaluga Oblast
Balakhna	Балахна	Nizhny Novgorod Oblast
Balakovo	Балаково	Saratov Oblast
Balashikha	Балашиха	Moscow Oblast
Balashov	Балашов	Saratov Oblast
Baley	Балей	Zabaykalsky Krai
Baltiysk	Балтийск	Kaliningrad Oblast
Barabinsk	Барабинск	Novosibirsk Oblast
Barnaul	Барнаул	Altai Krai
Barysh	Барыш	Ulyanovsk Oblast
Bataysk	Батайск	Rostov Oblast
Bavly	Бавлы	Republic of Tatarstan
Baykalsk	Байкальск	Irkutsk Oblast
Baymak	Баймак	Republic of Bashkortostan
Belaya Kalitva	Белая Калитва	Rostov Oblast
Belaya Kholunitsa	Белая Холуница	Kirov Oblast
Belebey	Белебей	Republic of Bashkortostan
Belgorod	Белгород	Belgorod Oblast
Belinsky	Белинский	Penza Oblast
Belogorsk	Белогорск	Amur Oblast
Belokurikha	Белокуриха	Altai Krai
Belomorsk	Беломорск	Karelia
Belorechensk	Белореченск	Krasnodar Krai
Beloretsk	Белорецк	Republic of Bashkortostan
Belousovo	Белоусово	Kaluga Oblast
Belovo	Белово	Kemerovo Oblast
Beloyarsky	Белоярский	Khanty-Mansi Autonomous Okrug
Belozersk	Белозерск	Vologda Oblast
Bely	Белый	Tver Oblast
Belyov	Белёв	Tula Oblast
Berdsk	Бердск	Novosibirsk Oblast
Berezniki	Березники	Perm Krai
Berezovsky	Березовский	Kemerovo Oblast
Berezovsky	Березовский	Sverdlovsk Oblast
Beslan	Беслан	Republic of North Ossetia–Alania
Bezhetsk	Бежецк	Tver Oblast
Bikin	Бикин	Khabarovsk Krai
Bilibino	Билибино	Chukotka Autonomous Okrug
Birobidzhan	Биробиджан	Jewish Autonomous Oblast
Birsk	Бирск	Republic of Bashkortostan
Biryuch	Бирюч	Belgorod Oblast
Biryusinsk	Бирюсинск	Irkutsk Oblast
Biysk	Бийск	Altai Krai
Blagodarny	Благодарный	Stavropol Krai
Blagoveshchensk	Благовещенск	Amur Oblast
Blagoveshchensk	Благовещенск	Republic of Bashkortostan
Bobrov	Бобров	Voronezh Oblast
Bodaybo	Бодайбо	Irkutsk Oblast
Bogdanovich	Богданович	Sverdlovsk Oblast
Bogoroditsk	Богородицк	Tula Oblast
Bogorodsk	Богородск	Nizhny Novgorod Oblast
Bogotol	Боготол	Krasnoyarsk Krai
Boguchar	Богучар	Voronezh Oblast
Boksitogorsk	Бокситогорск	Leningrad Oblast
Bolgar	Болгар	Republic of Tatarstan
Bolkhov	Болхов	Oryol Oblast
Bologoye	Бологое	Tver Oblast
Bolokhovo	Болохово	Tula Oblast
Bolotnoye	Болотное	Novosibirsk Oblast
Bolshoy Kamen	Большой Камень	Primorsky Krai
Bor	Бор	Nizhny Novgorod Oblast
Borisoglebsk	Борисоглебск	Voronezh Oblast
Borodino	Бородино	Krasnoyarsk Krai
Borovichi	Боровичи	Novgorod Oblast
Borovsk	Боровск	Kaluga Oblast
Borzya	Борзя	Zabaykalsky Krai
Bratsk	Братск	Irkutsk Oblast
Bronnitsy	Бронницы	Moscow Oblast
Bryansk	Брянск	Bryansk Oblast
Budyonnovsk	Будённовск	Stavropol Krai
Bugulma	Бугульма	Republic of Tatarstan
Buguruslan	Бугуруслан	Orenburg Oblast
Buinsk	Буинск	Republic of Tatarstan
Buturlinovka	Бутурлиновка	Voronezh Oblast
Buy	Буй	Kostroma Oblast
Buynaksk	Буйнакск	Dagestan
Buzuluk	Бузулук	Orenburg Oblast
Chadan	Чадан	Tuva Republic
Chapayevsk	Чапаевск	Samara Oblast
Chaplygin	Чаплыгин	Lipetsk Oblast
Chaykovsky	Чайковский	Perm Krai
Chebarkul	Чебаркуль	Chelyabinsk Oblast
Cheboksary	Чебоксары	Chuvash Republic
Chegem	Чегем	Kabardino-Balkar Republic
Chekalin	Чекалин	Tula Oblast
Chekhov	Чехов	Moscow Oblast
Chelyabinsk	Челябинск	Chelyabinsk Oblast
Cherdyn	Чердынь	Perm Krai
Cheremkhovo	Черемхово	Irkutsk Oblast
Cherepanovo	Черепаново	Novosibirsk Oblast
Cherepovets	Череповец	Vologda Oblast
Cherkessk	Черкесск	Karachay-Cherkessia
Chernogolovka	Черноголовка	Moscow Oblast
Chernogorsk	Черногорск	Republic of Khakassia
Chernushka	Чернушка	Perm Krai
Chernyakhovsk	Черняховск	Kaliningrad Oblast
Chistopol	Чистополь	Republic of Tatarstan
Chita	Чита	Zabaykalsky Krai
Chkalovsk	Чкаловск	Nizhny Novgorod Oblast
Chudovo	Чудово	Novgorod Oblast
Chukhloma	Чухлома	Kostroma Oblast
Chulym	Чулым	Novosibirsk Oblast
Chusovoy	Чусовой	Perm Krai
Chyormoz	Чёрмоз	Perm Krai
Dagestanskiye Ogni	Дагестанские Огни	Dagestan
Dalmatovo	Далматово	Kurgan Oblast
Dalnegorsk	Дальнегорск	Primorsky Krai
Dalnerechensk	Дальнереченск	Primorsky Krai
Danilov	Данилов	Yaroslavl Oblast
Dankov	Данков	Lipetsk Oblast
Davlekanovo	Давлеканово	Republic of Bashkortostan
Dedovsk	Дедовск	Moscow Oblast
Degtyarsk	Дегтярск	Sverdlovsk Oblast
Demidov	Демидов	Smolensk Oblast
Derbent	Дербент	Dagestan
Desnogorsk	Десногорск	Smolensk Oblast
Digora	Дигора	Republic of North Ossetia–Alania
Dimitrovgrad	Димитровград	Ulyanovsk Oblast
Divnogorsk	Дивногорск	Krasnoyarsk Krai
Dmitriyev	Дмитриев	Kursk Oblast
Dmitrov	Дмитров	Moscow Oblast
Dmitrovsk	Дмитровск	Oryol Oblast
Dno	Дно	Pskov Oblast
Dobryanka	Добрянка	Perm Krai
Dolgoprudny	Долгопрудный	Moscow Oblast
Dolinsk	Долинск	Sakhalin Oblast
Domodedovo	Домодедово	Moscow Oblast
Donetsk	Донецк	Rostov Oblast
Donskoy	Донской	Tula Oblast
Dorogobuzh	Дорогобуж	Smolensk Oblast
Drezna	Дрезна	Moscow Oblast
Dubna	Дубна	Moscow Oblast
Dubovka	Дубовка	Volgograd Oblast
Dudinka	Дудинка	Krasnoyarsk Krai
Dukhovshchina	Духовщина	Smolensk Oblast
Dyatkovo	Дятьково	Bryansk Oblast
Dyurtyuli	Дюртюли	Republic of Bashkortostan
Dzerzhinsk	Дзержинск	Nizhny Novgorod Oblast
Dzerzhinsky	Дзержинский	Moscow Oblast
Elektrogorsk	Электрогорск	Moscow Oblast
Elektrostal	Электросталь	Moscow Oblast
Elektrougli	Электроугли	Moscow Oblast
Elista	Элиста	Kalmykia
Engels	Энгельс	Saratov Oblast
Ertil	Эртиль	Voronezh Oblast
Fatezh	Фатеж	Kursk Oblast
Fokino	Фокино	Bryansk Oblast
Fokino	Фокино	Primorsky Krai
Frolovo	Фролово	Volgograd Oblast
Fryazino	Фрязино	Moscow Oblast
Furmanov	Фурманов	Ivanovo Oblast
Gadzhiyevo	Гаджиево	Murmansk Oblast
Gagarin	Гагарин	Smolensk Oblast
Galich	Галич	Kostroma Oblast
Gatchina	Гатчина	Leningrad Oblast
Gavrilov Posad	Гаврилов Посад	Ivanovo Oblast
Gavrilov-Yam	Гаврилов-Ям	Yaroslavl Oblast
Gay	Гай	Orenburg Oblast
Gdov	Гдов	Pskov Oblast
Gelendzhik	Геленджик	Krasnodar Krai
Georgiyevsk	Георгиевск	Stavropol Krai
Glazov	Глазов	Udmurtia
Golitsyno	Голицыно	Moscow Oblast
Gorbatov	Горбатов	Nizhny Novgorod Oblast
Gorno-Altaysk	Горно-Алтайск	Altai Republic
Gornozavodsk	Горнозаводск	Perm Krai
Gornyak	Горняк	Altai Krai
Gorodets	Городец	Nizhny Novgorod Oblast
Gorodishche	Городище	Penza Oblast
Gorodovikovsk	Городовиковск	Kalmykia
Gorokhovets	Гороховец	Vladimir Oblast
Goryachy Klyuch	Горячий Ключ	Krasnodar Krai
Grayvoron	Грайворон	Belgorod Oblast
Gremyachinsk	Гремячинск	Perm Krai
Grozny	Грозный	Chechen Republic
Gryazi	Грязи	Lipetsk Oblast
Gryazovets	Грязовец	Vologda Oblast
Gubakha	Губаха	Perm Krai
Gubkin	Губкин	Belgorod Oblast
Gubkinsky	Губкинский	Yamalo-Nenets Autonomous Okrug
Gudermes	Гудермес	Chechen Republic
Gukovo	Гуково	Rostov Oblast
Gulkevichi	Гулькевичи	Krasnodar Krai
Guryevsk	Гурьевск	Kaliningrad Oblast
Guryevsk	Гурьевск	Kemerovo Oblast
Gus-Khrustalny	Гусь-Хрустальный	Vladimir Oblast
Gusev	Гусев	Kaliningrad Oblast
Gusinoozyorsk	Гусиноозёрск	Republic of Buryatia
Gvardeysk	Гвардейск	Kaliningrad Oblast
Igarka	Игарка	Krasnoyarsk Krai
Ilansky	Иланский	Krasnoyarsk Krai
Innopolis	Иннополис	Republic of Tatarstan
Insar	Инсар	Republic of Mordovia
Inta	Инта	Komi Republic
Inza	Инза	Ulyanovsk Oblast
Ipatovo	Ипатово	Stavropol Krai
Irbit	Ирбит	Sverdlovsk Oblast
Irkutsk	Иркутск	Irkutsk Oblast
Ishim	Ишим	Tyumen Oblast
Ishimbay	Ишимбай	Republic of Bashkortostan
Isilkul	Исилькуль	Omsk Oblast
Iskitim	Искитим	Novosibirsk Oblast
Istra	Истра	Moscow Oblast
Ivangorod	Ивангород	Leningrad Oblast
Ivanovo	Иваново	Ivanovo Oblast
Ivanteyevka	Ивантеевка	Moscow Oblast
Ivdel	Ивдель	Sverdlovsk Oblast
Izberbash	Избербаш	Dagestan
Izhevsk	Ижевск	Udmurtia
Izobilny	Изобильный	Stavropol Krai
Kachkanar	Качканар	Sverdlovsk Oblast
Kadnikov	Кадников	Vologda Oblast
Kalach	Калач	Voronezh Oblast
Kalach-na-Donu	Калач-на-Дону	Volgograd Oblast
Kalachinsk	Калачинск	Omsk Oblast
Kaliningrad	Калининград	Kaliningrad Oblast
Kalininsk	Калининск	Saratov Oblast
Kaltan	Калтан	Kemerovo Oblast
Kaluga	Калуга	Kaluga Oblast
Kalyazin	Калязин	Tver Oblast
Kambarka	Камбарка	Udmurtia
Kamenka	Каменка	Penza Oblast
Kamen-na-Obi	Камень-на-Оби	Altai Krai
Kamennogorsk	Каменногорск	Leningrad Oblast
Kamensk-Shakhtinsky	Каменск-Шахтинский	Rostov Oblast
Kamensk-Uralsky	Каменск-Уральский	Sverdlovsk Oblast
Kameshkovo	Камешково	Vladimir Oblast
Kamyshin	Камышин	Volgograd Oblast
Kamyshlov	Камышлов	Sverdlovsk Oblast
Kamyzyak	Камызяк	Astrakhan Oblast
Kanash	Канаш	Chuvash Republic
Kandalaksha	Кандалакша	Murmansk Oblast
Kansk	Канск	Krasnoyarsk Krai
Karabanovo	Карабаново	Vladimir Oblast
Karabash	Карабаш	Chelyabinsk Oblast
Karabulak	Карабулак	Ingushetia
Karachayevsk	Карачаевск	Karachay-Cherkessia
Karachev	Карачев	Bryansk Oblast
Karasuk	Карасук	Novosibirsk Oblast
Kargat	Каргат	Novosibirsk Oblast
Kargopol	Каргополь	Arkhangelsk Oblast
Karpinsk	Карпинск	Sverdlovsk Oblast
Kartaly	Карталы	Chelyabinsk Oblast
Kashin	Кашин	Tver Oblast
Kashira	Кашира	Moscow Oblast
Kasimov	Касимов	Ryazan Oblast
Kasli	Касли	Chelyabinsk Oblast
Kaspiysk	Каспийск	Dagestan
Katav-Ivanovsk	Катав-Ивановск	Chelyabinsk Oblast
Kataysk	Катайск	Kurgan Oblast
Kazan	Казань	Republic of Tatarstan
Kedrovy	Кедровый	Tomsk Oblast
Kem	Кемь	Karelia
Kemerovo	Кемерово	Kemerovo Oblast
Khabarovsk	Хабаровск	Khabarovsk Krai
Khadyzhensk	Хадыженск	Krasnodar Krai
Khanty-Mansiysk	Ханты-Мансийск	Khanty-Mansi Autonomous Okrug
Kharabali	Харабали	Astrakhan Oblast
Kharovsk	Харовск	Vologda Oblast
Khasavyurt	Хасавюрт	Dagestan
Khilok	Хилок	Zabaykalsky Krai
Khimki	Химки	Moscow Oblast
Kholm	Холм	Novgorod Oblast
Kholmsk	Холмск	Sakhalin Oblast
Khotkovo	Хотьково	Moscow Oblast
Khvalynsk	Хвалынск	Saratov Oblast
Kimovsk	Кимовск	Tula Oblast
Kimry	Кимры	Tver Oblast
Kinel	Кинель	Samara Oblast
Kineshma	Кинешма	Ivanovo Oblast
Kingisepp	Кингисепп	Leningrad Oblast
Kirensk	Киренск	Irkutsk Oblast
Kireyevsk	Киреевск	Tula Oblast
Kirillov	Кириллов	Vologda Oblast
Kirishi	Кириши	Leningrad Oblast
Kirov	Киров	Kaluga Oblast
Kirov	Киров	Kirov Oblast
Kirovgrad	Кировград	Sverdlovsk Oblast
Kirovo-Chepetsk	Кирово-Чепецк	Kirov Oblast
Kirovsk	Кировск	Leningrad Oblast
Kirovsk	Кировск	Murmansk Oblast
Kirs	Кирс	Kirov Oblast
Kirsanov	Кирсанов	Tambov Oblast
Kirzhach	Киржач	Vladimir Oblast
Kiselyovsk	Киселёвск	Kemerovo Oblast
Kislovodsk	Кисловодск	Stavropol Krai
Kizel	Кизел	Perm Krai
Kizilyurt	Кизилюрт	Dagestan
Kizlyar	Кизляр	Dagestan
Klimovsk	Климовск	Moscow Oblast
Klin	Клин	Moscow Oblast
Klintsy	Клинцы	Bryansk Oblast
Knyaginino	Княгинино	Nizhny Novgorod Oblast
Kodinsk	Кодинск	Krasnoyarsk Krai
Kogalym	Когалым	Khanty-Mansi Autonomous Okrug
Kokhma	Кохма	Ivanovo Oblast
Kola	Кола	Murmansk Oblast
Kolchugino	Кольчугино	Vladimir Oblast
Kologriv	Кологрив	Kostroma Oblast
Kolomna	Коломна	Moscow Oblast
Kolpashevo	Колпашево	Tomsk Oblast
Kolpino	Колпино	Saint Petersburg
Kommunar	Коммунар	Leningrad Oblast
Komsomolsk	Комсомольск	Ivanovo Oblast
Komsomolsk-on-Amur	Комсомольск-на-Амуре	Khabarovsk Krai
Konakovo	Конаково	Tver Oblast
Kondopoga	Кондопога	Karelia
Kondrovo	Кондрово	Kaluga Oblast
Konstantinovsk	Константиновск	Rostov Oblast
Kopeysk	Копейск	Chelyabinsk Oblast
Korablino	Кораблино	Ryazan Oblast
Korenovsk	Кореновск	Krasnodar Krai
Korkino	Коркино	Chelyabinsk Oblast
Korocha	Короча	Belgorod Oblast
Korolyov	Королёв	Moscow Oblast
Korsakov	Корсаков	Sakhalin Oblast
Koryazhma	Коряжма	Arkhangelsk Oblast
Kosteryovo	Костерёво	Vladimir Oblast
Kostomuksha	Костомукша	Karelia
Kostroma	Кострома	Kostroma Oblast
Kotelnich	Котельнич	Kirov Oblast
Kotelniki	Котельники	Moscow Oblast
Kotelnikovo	Котельниково	Volgograd Oblast
Kotlas	Котлас	Arkhangelsk Oblast
Kotovo	Котово	Volgograd Oblast
Kotovsk	Котовск	Tambov Oblast
Kovdor	Ковдор	Murmansk Oblast
Kovrov	Ковров	Vladimir Oblast
Kovylkino	Ковылкино	Republic of Mordovia
Kozelsk	Козельск	Kaluga Oblast
Kozlovka	Козловка	Chuvash Republic
Kozmodemyansk	Козьмодемьянск	Mari El
Krasavino	Красавино	Vologda Oblast
Krasnoarmeysk	Красноармейск	Moscow Oblast
Krasnoarmeysk	Красноармейск	Saratov Oblast
Krasnodar	Краснодар	Krasnodar Krai
Krasnogorsk	Красногорск	Moscow Oblast
Krasnokamensk	Краснокаменск	Zabaykalsky Krai
Krasnokamsk	Краснокамск	Perm Krai
Krasnoslobodsk	Краснослободск	Volgograd Oblast
Krasnoslobodsk	Краснослободск	Republic of Mordovia
Krasnoturyinsk	Краснотурьинск	Sverdlovsk Oblast
Krasnoufimsk	Красноуфимск	Sverdlovsk Oblast
Krasnouralsk	Красноуральск	Sverdlovsk Oblast
Krasnovishersk	Красновишерск	Perm Krai
Krasnoyarsk	Красноярск	Krasnoyarsk Krai
Krasnoye Selo	Красное Село	Saint Petersburg
Krasnozavodsk	Краснозаводск	Moscow Oblast
Krasnoznamensk	Краснознаменск	Kaliningrad Oblast
Krasnoznamensk	Краснознаменск	Moscow Oblast
Krasny Kholm	Красный Холм	Tver Oblast
Krasny Kut	Красный Кут	Saratov Oblast
Krasny Sulin	Красный Сулин	Rostov Oblast
Kremyonki	Кремёнки	Kaluga Oblast
Kronstadt	Кронштадт	Saint Petersburg
Kropotkin	Кропоткин	Krasnodar Krai
Krymsk	Крымск	Krasnodar Krai
Kstovo	Кстово	Nizhny Novgorod Oblast
Kubinka	Кубинка	Moscow Oblast
Kudymkar	Кудымкар	Perm Krai
Kulebaki	Кулебаки	Nizhny Novgorod Oblast
Kumertau	Кумертау	Republic of Bashkortostan
Kungur	Кунгур	Perm Krai
Kupino	Купино	Novosibirsk Oblast
Kurchatov	Курчатов	Kursk Oblast
Kurgan	Курган	Kurgan Oblast
Kurganinsk	Курганинск	Krasnodar Krai
Kurilsk	Курильск	Sakhalin Oblast
Kurlovo	Курлово	Vladimir Oblast
Kurovskoye	Куровское	Moscow Oblast
Kursk	Курск	Kursk Oblast
Kurtamysh	Куртамыш	Kurgan Oblast
Kusa	Куса	Chelyabinsk Oblast
Kushva	Кушва	Sverdlovsk Oblast
Kuvandyk	Кувандык	Orenburg Oblast
Kuvshinovo	Кувшиново	Tver Oblast
Kuybyshev	Куйбышев	Novosibirsk Oblast
Kuznetsk	Кузнецк	Penza Oblast
Kyakhta	Кяхта	Republic of Buryatia
Kyshtym	Кыштым	Chelyabinsk Oblast
Kyzyl	Кызыл	Tuva Republic
Labinsk	Лабинск	Krasnodar Krai
Labytnangi	Лабытнанги	Yamalo-Nenets Autonomous Okrug
Ladushkin	Ладушкин	Kaliningrad Oblast
Lagan	Лагань	Kalmykia
Laishevo	Лаишево	Republic of Tatarstan
Lakhdenpokhya	Лахденпохья	Karelia
Lakinsk	Лакинск	Vladimir Oblast
Langepas	Лангепас	Khanty-Mansi Autonomous Okrug
Lebedyan	Лебедянь	Lipetsk Oblast
Leninogorsk	Лениногорск	Republic of Tatarstan
Leninsk	Ленинск	Volgograd Oblast
Leninsk-Kuznetsky	Ленинск-Кузнецкий	Kemerovo Oblast
Lensk	Ленск	Sakha Republic
Lermontov	Лермонтов	Stavropol Krai
Lesnoy	Лесной	Sverdlovsk Oblast
Lesosibirsk	Лесосибирск	Krasnoyarsk Krai
Lesozavodsk	Лесозаводск	Primorsky Krai
Lgov	Льгов	Kursk Oblast
Likhoslavl	Лихославль	Tver Oblast
Likino-Dulyovo	Ликино-Дулёво	Moscow Oblast
Lipetsk	Липецк	Lipetsk Oblast
Lipki	Липки	Tula Oblast
Liski	Лиски	Voronezh Oblast
Livny	Ливны	Oryol Oblast
Lobnya	Лобня	Moscow Oblast
Lodeynoye Pole	Лодейное Поле	Leningrad Oblast
Lomonosov	Ломоносов	Saint Petersburg
Losino-Petrovsky	Лосино-Петровский	Moscow Oblast
Luga	Луга	Leningrad Oblast
Lukhovitsy	Луховицы	Moscow Oblast
Lukoyanov	Лукоянов	Nizhny Novgorod Oblast
Luza	Луза	Kirov Oblast
Lyantor	Лянтор	Khanty-Mansi Autonomous Okrug
Lyskovo	Лысково	Nizhny Novgorod Oblast
Lysva	Лысьва	Perm Krai
Lytkarino	Лыткарино	Moscow Oblast
Lyuban	Любань	Leningrad Oblast
Lyubertsy	Люберцы	Moscow Oblast
Lyubim	Любим	Yaroslavl Oblast
Lyudinovo	Людиново	Kaluga Oblast
Magadan	Магадан	Magadan Oblast
Magas	Магас	Ingushetia
Magnitogorsk	Магнитогорск	Chelyabinsk Oblast
Makarov	Макаров	Sakhalin Oblast
Makaryev	Макарьев	Kostroma Oblast
Makhachkala	Махачкала	Dagestan
Makushino	Макушино	Kurgan Oblast
Malaya Vishera	Малая Вишера	Novgorod Oblast
Malgobek	Малгобек	Ingushetia
Malmyzh	Малмыж	Kirov Oblast
Maloarkhangelsk	Малоархангельск	Oryol Oblast
Maloyaroslavets	Малоярославец	Kaluga Oblast
Mamadysh	Мамадыш	Republic of Tatarstan
Mamonovo	Мамоново	Kaliningrad Oblast
Manturovo	Мантурово	Kostroma Oblast
Mariinsk	Мариинск	Kemerovo Oblast
Mariinsky Posad	Мариинский Посад	Chuvash Republic
Marks	Маркс	Saratov Oblast
Maykop	Майкоп	Republic of Adygea
Maysky	Майский	Kabardino-Balkar Republic
Mednogorsk	Медногорск	Orenburg Oblast
Medvezhyegorsk	Медвежьегорск	Karelia
Medyn	Медынь	Kaluga Oblast
Megion	Мегион	Khanty-Mansi Autonomous Okrug
Melenki	Меленки	Vladimir Oblast
Meleuz	Мелеуз	Republic of Bashkortostan
Mendeleyevsk	Менделеевск	Republic of Tatarstan
Menzelinsk	Мензелинск	Republic of Tatarstan
Meshchovsk	Мещовск	Kaluga Oblast
Mezen	Мезень	Arkhangelsk Oblast
Mezhdurechensk	Междуреченск	Kemerovo Oblast
Mezhgorye	Межгорье	Republic of Bashkortostan
Mglin	Мглин	Bryansk Oblast
Miass	Миасс	Chelyabinsk Oblast
Michurinsk	Мичуринск	Tambov Oblast
Mikhaylov	Михайлов	Ryazan Oblast
Mikhaylovka	Михайловка	Volgograd Oblast
Mikhaylovsk	Михайловск	Sverdlovsk Oblast
Mikhaylovsk	Михайловск	Stavropol Krai
Mikun	Микунь	Komi Republic
Millerovo	Миллерово	Rostov Oblast
Mineralnye Vody	Минеральные Воды	Stavropol Krai
Minusinsk	Минусинск	Krasnoyarsk Krai
Minyar	Миньяр	Chelyabinsk Oblast
Mirny	Мирный	Arkhangelsk Oblast
Mirny	Мирный	Sakha Republic
Mogocha	Могоча	Zabaykalsky Krai
Monchegorsk	Мончегорск	Murmansk Oblast
Morozovsk	Морозовск	Rostov Oblast
Morshansk	Моршанск	Tambov Oblast
Mosalsk	Мосальск	Kaluga Oblast
Moskovsky	Московский	Moscow
Moscow	Москва	Moscow
Mozdok	Моздок	Republic of North Ossetia–Alania
Mozhaysk	Можайск	Moscow Oblast
Mozhga	Можга	Udmurtia
Mtsensk	Мценск	Oryol Oblast
Murashi	Мураши	Kirov Oblast
Muravlenko	Муравленко	Yamalo-Nenets Autonomous Okrug
Murino	Мурино	Leningrad Oblast
Murmansk	Мурманск	Murmansk Oblast
Murom	Муром	Vladimir Oblast
Myshkin	Мышкин	Yaroslavl Oblast
Myski	Мыски	Kemerovo Oblast
Mytishchi	Мытищи	Moscow Oblast
Naberezhnye Chelny	Набережные Челны	Republic of Tatarstan
Nadym	Надым	Yamalo-Nenets Autonomous Okrug
Nakhodka	Находка	Primorsky Krai
Nalchik	Нальчик	Kabardino-Balkar Republic
Narimanov	Нариманов	Astrakhan Oblast
Naro-Fominsk	Наро-Фоминск	Moscow Oblast
Nartkala	Нарткала	Kabardino-Balkar Republic
Naryan-Mar	Нарьян-Мар	Nenets Autonomous Okrug
Naukan	Наукан	Chukotka Autonomous Okrug
Navashino	Навашино	Nizhny Novgorod Oblast
Navoloki	Наволоки	Ivanovo Oblast
Nazarovo	Назарово	Krasnoyarsk Krai
Nazran	Назрань	Ingushetia
Nazyvayevsk	Называевск	Omsk Oblast
Neftegorsk, Samara Oblast	Нефтегорск	Samara Oblast
Neftekamsk	Нефтекамск	Republic of Bashkortostan
Neftekumsk	Нефтекумск	Stavropol Krai
Nefteyugansk	Нефтеюганск	Khanty-Mansi Autonomous Okrug
Nelidovo	Нелидово	Tver Oblast
Neman	Неман	Kaliningrad Oblast
Nerchinsk	Нерчинск	Zabaykalsky Krai
Nerekhta	Нерехта	Kostroma Oblast
Neryungri	Нерюнгри	Sakha Republic
Nesterov	Нестеров	Kaliningrad Oblast
Nevel	Невель	Pskov Oblast
Nevelsk	Невельск	Sakhalin Oblast
Nevinnomyssk	Невинномысск	Stavropol Krai
Nevyansk	Невьянск	Sverdlovsk Oblast
Neya	Нея	Kostroma Oblast
Nikolayevsk	Николаевск	Volgograd Oblast
Nikolayevsk-on-Amur	Николаевск-на-Амуре	Khabarovsk Krai
Nikolsk	Никольск	Vologda Oblast
Nikolsk	Никольск	Penza Oblast
Nikolskoye	Никольское	Leningrad Oblast
Nizhnekamsk	Нижнекамск	Republic of Tatarstan
Nizhneudinsk	Нижнеудинск	Irkutsk Oblast
Nizhnevartovsk	Нижневартовск	Khanty-Mansi Autonomous Okrug
Nizhniye Sergi	Нижние Серги	Sverdlovsk Oblast
Nizhny Lomov	Нижний Ломов	Penza Oblast
Nizhny Novgorod	Нижний Новгород	Nizhny Novgorod Oblast
Nizhny Tagil	Нижний Тагил	Sverdlovsk Oblast
Nizhnyaya Salda	Нижняя Салда	Sverdlovsk Oblast
Nizhnyaya Tura	Нижняя Тура	Sverdlovsk Oblast
Noginsk	Ногинск	Moscow Oblast
Nolinsk	Нолинск	Kirov Oblast
Norilsk	Норильск	Krasnoyarsk Krai
Novaya Ladoga	Новая Ладога	Leningrad Oblast
Novaya Lyalya	Новая Ляля	Sverdlovsk Oblast
Novoalexandrovsk	Новоалександровск	Stavropol Krai
Novoaltaysk	Новоалтайск	Altai Krai
Novoanninsky	Новоаннинский	Volgograd Oblast
Novocheboksarsk	Новочебоксарск	Chuvash Republic
Novocherkassk	Новочеркасск	Rostov Oblast
Novodvinsk	Новодвинск	Arkhangelsk Oblast
Novokhopyorsk	Новохопёрск	Voronezh Oblast
Novokubansk	Новокубанск	Krasnodar Krai
Novokuybyshevsk	Новокуйбышевск	Samara Oblast
Novokuznetsk	Новокузнецк	Kemerovo Oblast
Novomichurinsk	Новомичуринск	Ryazan Oblast
Novomoskovsk	Новомосковск	Tula Oblast
Novopavlovsk	Новопавловск	Stavropol Krai
Novorossiysk	Новороссийск	Krasnodar Krai
Novorzhev	Новоржев	Pskov Oblast
Novoshakhtinsk	Новошахтинск	Rostov Oblast
Novosibirsk	Новосибирск	Novosibirsk Oblast
Novosil	Новосиль	Oryol Oblast
Novosokolniki	Новосокольники	Pskov Oblast
Novotroitsk	Новотроицк	Orenburg Oblast
Novoulyanovsk	Новоульяновск	Ulyanovsk Oblast
Novouralsk	Новоуральск	Sverdlovsk Oblast
Novouzensk	Новоузенск	Saratov Oblast
Novovoronezh	Нововоронеж	Voronezh Oblast
Novozybkov	Новозыбков	Bryansk Oblast
Novy Oskol	Новый Оскол	Belgorod Oblast
Novy Urengoy	Новый Уренгой	Yamalo-Nenets Autonomous Okrug
Noyabrsk	Ноябрьск	Yamalo-Nenets Autonomous Okrug
Nurlat	Нурлат	Republic of Tatarstan
Nyagan	Нягань	Khanty-Mansi Autonomous Okrug
Nyandoma	Няндома	Arkhangelsk Oblast
Nyazepetrovsk	Нязепетровск	Chelyabinsk Oblast
Nytva	Нытва	Perm Krai
Nyurba	Нюрба	Sakha Republic
Ob	Обь	Novosibirsk Oblast
Obluchye	Облучье	Jewish Autonomous Oblast
Obninsk	Обнинск	Kaluga Oblast
Oboyan	Обоянь	Kursk Oblast
Ochyor	Очёр	Perm Krai
Odintsovo	Одинцово	Moscow Oblast
Okha	Оха	Sakhalin Oblast
Okhansk	Оханск	Perm Krai
Oktyabrsk	Октябрьск	Samara Oblast
Oktyabrsky	Октябрьский	Republic of Bashkortostan
Okulovka	Окуловка	Novgorod Oblast
Olenegorsk	Оленегорск	Murmansk Oblast
Olonets	Олонец	Karelia
Olyokminsk	Олёкминск	Sakha Republic
Omsk	Омск	Omsk Oblast
Omutninsk	Омутнинск	Kirov Oblast
Onega	Онега	Arkhangelsk Oblast
Opochka	Опочка	Pskov Oblast
Orekhovo-Zuyevo	Орехово-Зуево	Moscow Oblast
Oryol	Орёл	Oryol Oblast
Orenburg	Оренбург	Orenburg Oblast
Orlov	Орлов	Kirov Oblast
Orsk	Орск	Orenburg Oblast
Osa	Оса	Perm Krai
Osinniki	Осинники	Kemerovo Oblast
Ostashkov	Осташков	Tver Oblast
Ostrogozhsk	Острогожск	Voronezh Oblast
Ostrov	Остров	Pskov Oblast
Ostrovnoy	Островной	Murmansk Oblast
Otradnoye	Отрадное	Leningrad Oblast
Otradny	Отрадный	Samara Oblast
Ozyorsk	Озёрск	Kaliningrad Oblast
Ozyorsk	Озёрск	Chelyabinsk Oblast
Ozherelye	Ожерелье	Moscow Oblast
Ozyory	Озёры	Moscow Oblast
Pallasovka	Палласовка	Volgograd Oblast
Partizansk	Партизанск	Primorsky Krai
Pavlovo	Павлово	Nizhny Novgorod Oblast
Pavlovsk	Павловск	Voronezh Oblast
Pavlovsk	Павловск	Saint Petersburg
Pavlovsky Posad	Павловский Посад	Moscow Oblast
Pechora	Печора	Komi Republic
Pechory	Печоры	Pskov Oblast
Penza	Пенза	Penza Oblast
Pereslavl-Zalessky	Переславль-Залесский	Yaroslavl Oblast
Peresvet	Пересвет	Moscow Oblast
Perevoz	Перевоз	Nizhny Novgorod Oblast
Perm	Пермь	Perm Krai
Pervomaysk	Первомайск	Nizhny Novgorod Oblast
Pervouralsk	Первоуральск	Sverdlovsk Oblast
Pestovo	Пестово	Novgorod Oblast
Petergof	Петергоф	Saint Petersburg
Petropavlovsk-Kamchatsky	Петропавловск-Камчатский	Kamchatka Krai
Petrov Val	Петров Вал	Volgograd Oblast
Petrovsk	Петровск	Saratov Oblast
Petrovsk-Zabaykalsky	Петровск-Забайкальский	Zabaykalsky Krai
Petrozavodsk	Петрозаводск	Karelia
Petukhovo	Петухово	Kurgan Oblast
Petushki	Петушки	Vladimir Oblast
Pevek	Певек	Chukotka Autonomous Okrug
Pikalyovo	Пикалёво	Leningrad Oblast
Pionersky	Пионерский	Kaliningrad Oblast
Pitkyaranta	Питкяранта	Karelia
Plast	Пласт	Chelyabinsk Oblast
Plavsk	Плавск	Tula Oblast
Plyos	Плёс	Ivanovo Oblast
Pochep	Почеп	Bryansk Oblast
Pochinok	Починок	Smolensk Oblast
Podolsk	Подольск	Moscow Oblast
Podporozhye	Подпорожье	Leningrad Oblast
Pokachi	Покачи	Khanty-Mansi Autonomous Okrug
Pokhvistnevo	Похвистнево	Samara Oblast
Pokrov	Покров	Vladimir Oblast
Pokrovsk	Покровск	Sakha Republic
Polessk	Полесск	Kaliningrad Oblast
Polevskoy	Полевской	Sverdlovsk Oblast
Polyarny	Полярный	Murmansk Oblast
Polyarnye Zori	Полярные Зори	Murmansk Oblast
Polysayevo	Полысаево	Kemerovo Oblast
Porkhov	Порхов	Pskov Oblast
Poronaysk	Поронайск	Sakhalin Oblast
Poshekhonye	Пошехонье	Yaroslavl Oblast
Povorino	Поворино	Voronezh Oblast
Pravdinsk	Правдинск	Kaliningrad Oblast
Primorsk	Приморск	Leningrad Oblast
Primorsko-Akhtarsk	Приморско-Ахтарск	Krasnodar Krai
Priozersk	Приозерск	Leningrad Oblast
Privolzhsk	Приволжск	Ivanovo Oblast
Prokhladny	Прохладный	Kabardino-Balkar Republic
Prokopyevsk	Прокопьевск	Kemerovo Oblast
Proletarsk	Пролетарск	Rostov Oblast
Protvino	Протвино	Moscow Oblast
Pskov	Псков	Pskov Oblast
Puchezh	Пучеж	Ivanovo Oblast
Pudozh	Пудож	Karelia
Pugachyov	Пугачев	Saratov Oblast
Pushchino	Пущино	Moscow Oblast
Pushkin	Пушкин	Saint Petersburg
Pushkino	Пушкино	Moscow Oblast
Pustoshka	Пустошка	Pskov Oblast
Pyatigorsk	Пятигорск	Stavropol Krai
Pytalovo	Пыталово	Pskov Oblast
Pyt-Yakh	Пыть-Ях	Khanty-Mansi Autonomous Okrug
Raduzhny	Радужный	Vladimir Oblast
Raduzhny	Радужный	Khanty-Mansi Autonomous Okrug
Ramenskoye	Раменское	Moscow Oblast
Rasskazovo	Рассказово	Tambov Oblast
Raychikhinsk	Райчихинск	Amur Oblast
Reutov	Реутов	Moscow Oblast
Revda	Ревда	Sverdlovsk Oblast
Rezh	Реж	Sverdlovsk Oblast
Rodniki	Родники	Ivanovo Oblast
Roshal	Рошаль	Moscow Oblast
Roslavl	Рославль	Smolensk Oblast
Rossosh	Россошь	Voronezh Oblast
Rostov	Ростов	Yaroslavl Oblast
Rostov-on-Don	Ростов-на-Дону	Rostov Oblast
Rtishchevo	Ртищево	Saratov Oblast
Rubtsovsk	Рубцовск	Altai Krai
Rudnya	Рудня	Smolensk Oblast
Ruza	Руза	Moscow Oblast
Ruzayevka	Рузаевка	Republic of Mordovia
Ryazan	Рязань	Ryazan Oblast
Ryazhsk	Ряжск	Ryazan Oblast
Rybinsk	Рыбинск	Yaroslavl Oblast
Rybnoye	Рыбное	Ryazan Oblast
Rylsk	Рыльск	Kursk Oblast
Rzhev	Ржев	Tver Oblast
Safonovo	Сафоново	Smolensk Oblast
Saint Petersburg	Санкт-Петербург	Saint Petersburg
Salair	Салаир	Kemerovo Oblast
Salavat	Салават	Republic of Bashkortostan
Salekhard	Салехард	Yamalo-Nenets Autonomous Okrug
Salsk	Сальск	Rostov Oblast
Samara	Самара	Samara Oblast
Saransk	Саранск	Republic of Mordovia
Sarapul	Сарапул	Udmurtia
Saratov	Саратов	Saratov Oblast
Sarov	Саров	Nizhny Novgorod Oblast
Sasovo	Сасово	Ryazan Oblast
Satka	Сатка	Chelyabinsk Oblast
Sayanogorsk	Саяногорск	Republic of Khakassia
Sayansk	Саянск	Irkutsk Oblast
Sebezh	Себеж	Pskov Oblast
Segezha	Сегежа	Karelia
Seltso	Сельцо	Bryansk Oblast
Semikarakorsk	Семикаракорск	Rostov Oblast
Semiluki	Семилуки	Voronezh Oblast
Semyonov	Семёнов	Nizhny Novgorod Oblast
Sengiley	Сенгилей	Ulyanovsk Oblast
Serafimovich	Серафимович	Volgograd Oblast
Serdobsk	Сердобск	Penza Oblast
Sergach	Сергач	Nizhny Novgorod Oblast
Sergiyev Posad	Сергиев Посад	Moscow Oblast
Serov	Серов	Sverdlovsk Oblast
Serpukhov	Серпухов	Moscow Oblast
Sertolovo	Сертолово	Leningrad Oblast
Sestroretsk	Сестрорецк	Saint Petersburg
Severobaykalsk	Северобайкальск	Republic of Buryatia
Severodvinsk	Северодвинск	Arkhangelsk Oblast
Severo-Kurilsk	Северо-Курильск	Sakhalin Oblast
Severomorsk	Североморск	Murmansk Oblast
Severouralsk	Североуральск	Sverdlovsk Oblast
Seversk	Северск	Tomsk Oblast
Sevsk	Севск	Bryansk Oblast
Shadrinsk	Шадринск	Kurgan Oblast
Shagonar	Шагонар	Tuva Republic
Shakhtyorsk	Шахтерск	Sakhalin Oblast
Shakhty	Шахты	Rostov Oblast
Shakhunya	Шахунья	Nizhny Novgorod Oblast
Shali	Шали	Chechen Republic
Sharya	Шарья	Kostroma Oblast
Sharypovo	Шарыпово	Krasnoyarsk Krai
Shatsk	Шацк	Ryazan Oblast
Shatura	Шатура	Moscow Oblast
Shcherbinka	Щербинка	Moscow Oblast
Shchigry	Щигры	Kursk Oblast
Shchuchye	Щучье	Kurgan Oblast
Shchyokino	Щёкино	Tula Oblast
Shchyolkovo	Щёлково	Moscow Oblast
Shebekino	Шебекино	Belgorod Oblast
Shelekhov	Шелехов	Irkutsk Oblast
Shenkursk	Шенкурск	Arkhangelsk Oblast
Shikhany	Шиханы	Saratov Oblast
Shilka	Шилка	Zabaykalsky Krai
Shimanovsk	Шимановск	Amur Oblast
Shlisselburg	Шлиссельбург	Leningrad Oblast
Shumerlya	Шумерля	Chuvash Republic
Shumikha	Шумиха	Kurgan Oblast
Shuya	Шуя	Ivanovo Oblast
Sibay	Сибай	Republic of Bashkortostan
Sim	Сим	Chelyabinsk Oblast
Skopin	Скопин	Ryazan Oblast
Skovorodino	Сковородино	Amur Oblast
Slantsy	Сланцы	Leningrad Oblast
Slavgorod	Славгород	Altai Krai
Slavsk	Славск	Kaliningrad Oblast
Slavyansk-na-Kubani	Славянск-на-Кубани	Krasnodar Krai
Slobodskoy	Слободской	Kirov Oblast
Slyudyanka	Слюдянка	Irkutsk Oblast
Smolensk	Смоленск	Smolensk Oblast
Snezhinsk	Снежинск	Chelyabinsk Oblast
Snezhnogorsk	Снежногорск	Murmansk Oblast
Sobinka	Собинка	Vladimir Oblast
Sochi	Сочи	Krasnodar Krai
Sokol	Сокол	Vologda Oblast
Sokolniki	Сокольники	Tula Oblast
Soligalich	Солигалич	Kostroma Oblast
Solikamsk	Соликамск	Perm Krai
Sol-Iletsk	Соль-Илецк	Orenburg Oblast
Solnechnogorsk	Солнечногорск	Moscow Oblast
Soltsy	Сольцы	Novgorod Oblast
Solvychegodsk	Сольвычегодск	Arkhangelsk Oblast
Sorochinsk	Сорочинск	Orenburg Oblast
Sorsk	Сорск	Republic of Khakassia
Sortavala	Сортавала	Karelia
Sosensky	Сосенский	Kaluga Oblast
Sosnogorsk	Сосногорск	Komi Republic
Sosnovka	Сосновка	Kirov Oblast
Sosnovoborsk	Сосновоборск	Krasnoyarsk Krai
Sosnovy Bor	Сосновый Бор	Leningrad Oblast
Sovetsk	Советск	Kaliningrad Oblast
Sovetsk	Советск	Kirov Oblast
Sovetsk	Советск	Tula Oblast
Sovetskaya Gavan	Советская Гавань	Khabarovsk Krai
Sovetsky	Советский	Khanty-Mansi Autonomous Okrug
Spas-Demensk	Спас-Деменск	Kaluga Oblast
Spas-Klepiki	Спас-Клепики	Ryazan Oblast
Spassk	Спасск	Penza Oblast
Spassk-Dalny	Спасск-Дальний	Primorsky Krai
Spassk-Ryazansky	Спасск-Рязанский	Ryazan Oblast
Srednekolymsk	Среднеколымск	Sakha Republic
Sredneuralsk	Среднеуральск	Sverdlovsk Oblast
Sretensk	Сретенск	Zabaykalsky Krai
Staraya Kupavna	Старая Купавна	Moscow Oblast
Staraya Russa	Старая Русса	Novgorod Oblast
Staritsa	Старица	Tver Oblast
Starodub	Стародуб	Bryansk Oblast
Stary Oskol	Старый Оскол	Belgorod Oblast
Stavropol	Ставрополь	Stavropol Krai
Sterlitamak	Стерлитамак	Republic of Bashkortostan
Strezhevoy	Стрежевой	Tomsk Oblast
Stroitel	Строитель	Belgorod Oblast
Strunino	Струнино	Vladimir Oblast
Stupino	Ступино	Moscow Oblast
Sudogda	Судогда	Vladimir Oblast
Sudzha	Суджа	Kursk Oblast
Sukhinichi	Сухиничи	Kaluga Oblast
Sukhoy Log	Сухой Лог	Sverdlovsk Oblast
Suoyarvi	Суоярви	Karelia
Surazh	Сураж	Bryansk Oblast
Surgut	Сургут	Khanty-Mansi Autonomous Okrug
Surovikino	Суровикино	Volgograd Oblast
Sursk	Сурск	Penza Oblast
Susuman	Сусуман	Magadan Oblast
Suvorov	Суворов	Tula Oblast
Suzdal	Суздаль	Vladimir Oblast
Svetlogorsk	Светлогорск	Kaliningrad Oblast
Svetlograd	Светлоград	Stavropol Krai
Svetly	Светлый	Kaliningrad Oblast
Svetogorsk	Светогорск	Leningrad Oblast
Svirsk	Свирск	Irkutsk Oblast
Svobodny	Свободный	Amur Oblast
Syasstroy	Сясьстрой	Leningrad Oblast
Sychyovka	Сычёвка	Smolensk Oblast
Syktyvkar	Сыктывкар	Komi Republic
Sysert	Сысерть	Sverdlovsk Oblast
Syzran	Сызрань	Samara Oblast
Taganrog	Таганрог	Rostov Oblast
Taldom	Талдом	Moscow Oblast
Talitsa	Талица	Sverdlovsk Oblast
Tambov	Тамбов	Tambov Oblast
Tara	Тара	Omsk Oblast
Tarko-Sale	Тарко-Сале	Yamalo-Nenets Autonomous Okrug
Tarusa	Таруса	Kaluga Oblast
Tashtagol	Таштагол	Kemerovo Oblast
Tatarsk	Татарск	Novosibirsk Oblast
Tavda	Тавда	Sverdlovsk Oblast
Tayga	Тайга	Kemerovo Oblast
Tayshet	Тайшет	Irkutsk Oblast
Teberda	Теберда	Karachay-Cherkessia
Temnikov	Темников	Republic of Mordovia
Temryuk	Темрюк	Krasnodar Krai
Terek	Терек	Kabardino-Balkar Republic
Tetyushi	Тетюши	Republic of Tatarstan
Teykovo	Тейково	Ivanovo Oblast
Tikhoretsk	Тихорецк	Krasnodar Krai
Tikhvin	Тихвин	Leningrad Oblast
Timashyovsk	Тимашёвск	Krasnodar Krai
Tobolsk	Тобольск	Tyumen Oblast
Toguchin	Тогучин	Novosibirsk Oblast
Tolyatti	Тольятти	Samara Oblast
Tomari	Томари	Sakhalin Oblast
Tommot	Томмот	Sakha Republic
Tomsk	Томск	Tomsk Oblast
Topki	Топки	Kemerovo Oblast
Toropets	Торопец	Tver Oblast
Torzhok	Торжок	Tver Oblast
Tosno	Тосно	Leningrad Oblast
Totma	Тотьма	Vologda Oblast
Troitsk	Троицк	Moscow
Troitsk	Троицк	Chelyabinsk Oblast
Trubchevsk	Трубчевск	Bryansk Oblast
Tryokhgorny	Трёхгорный	Chelyabinsk Oblast
Tsimlyansk	Цимлянск	Rostov Oblast
Tsivilsk	Цивильск	Chuvash Republic
Tuapse	Туапсе	Krasnodar Krai
Tula	Тула	Tula Oblast
Tulun	Тулун	Irkutsk Oblast
Turan	Туран	Tuva Republic
Turinsk	Туринск	Sverdlovsk Oblast
Tutayev	Тутаев	Yaroslavl Oblast
Tuymazy	Туймазы	Republic of Bashkortostan
Tver	Тверь	Tver Oblast
Tynda	Тында	Amur Oblast
Tyrnyauz	Тырныауз	Kabardino-Balkar Republic
Tyukalinsk	Тюкалинск	Omsk Oblast
Tyumen	Тюмень	Tyumen Oblast
Uchaly	Учалы	Republic of Bashkortostan
Udachny	Удачный	Sakha Republic
Udomlya	Удомля	Tver Oblast
Ufa	Уфа	Republic of Bashkortostan
Uglegorsk	Углегорск	Sakhalin Oblast
Uglich	Углич	Yaroslavl Oblast
Ukhta	Ухта	Komi Republic
Ulan-Ude	Улан-Удэ	Republic of Buryatia
Ulyanovsk	Ульяновск	Ulyanovsk Oblast
Unecha	Унеча	Bryansk Oblast
Uray	Урай	Khanty-Mansi Autonomous Okrug
Uren	Урень	Nizhny Novgorod Oblast
Urus-Martan	Урус-Мартан	Chechen Republic
Uryupinsk	Урюпинск	Volgograd Oblast
Urzhum	Уржум	Kirov Oblast
Usinsk	Усинск	Komi Republic
Usman	Усмань	Lipetsk Oblast
Usolye	Усолье	Perm Krai
Usolye-Sibirskoye	Усолье-Сибирское	Irkutsk Oblast
Ussuriysk	Уссурийск	Primorsky Krai
Ust-Dzheguta	Усть-Джегута	Karachay-Cherkessia
Ust-Ilimsk	Усть-Илимск	Irkutsk Oblast
Ust-Katav	Усть-Катав	Chelyabinsk Oblast
Ust-Kut	Усть-Кут	Irkutsk Oblast
Ust-Labinsk	Усть-Лабинск	Krasnodar Krai
Ustyuzhna	Устюжна	Vologda Oblast
Uvarovo	Уварово	Tambov Oblast
Uyar	Уяр	Krasnoyarsk Krai
Uzhur	Ужур	Krasnoyarsk Krai
Uzlovaya	Узловая	Tula Oblast
Valday	Валдай	Novgorod Oblast
Valuyki	Валуйки	Belgorod Oblast
Velikiye Luki	Великие Луки	Pskov Oblast
Veliky Novgorod	Великий Новгород	Novgorod Oblast
Veliky Ustyug	Великий Устюг	Vologda Oblast
Velizh	Велиж	Smolensk Oblast
Velsk	Вельск	Arkhangelsk Oblast
Venyov	Венёв	Tula Oblast
Vereshchagino	Верещагино	Perm Krai
Vereya	Верея	Moscow Oblast
Verkhneuralsk	Верхнеуральск	Chelyabinsk Oblast
Verkhny Tagil	Верхний Тагил	Sverdlovsk Oblast
Verkhny Ufaley	Верхний Уфалей	Chelyabinsk Oblast
Verkhnyaya Pyshma	Верхняя Пышма	Sverdlovsk Oblast
Verkhnyaya Salda	Верхняя Салда	Sverdlovsk Oblast
Verkhnyaya Tura	Верхняя Тура	Sverdlovsk Oblast
Verkhoturye	Верхотурье	Sverdlovsk Oblast
Verkhoyansk	Верхоянск	Sakha Republic
Vesyegonsk	Весьегонск	Tver Oblast
Vetluga	Ветлуга	Nizhny Novgorod Oblast
Vichuga	Вичуга	Ivanovo Oblast
Vidnoye	Видное	Moscow Oblast
Vikhorevka	Вихоревка	Irkutsk Oblast
Vilyuchinsk	Вилючинск	Kamchatka Krai
Vilyuysk	Вилюйск	Sakha Republic
Vladikavkaz	Владикавказ	Republic of North Ossetia–Alania
Vladimir	Владимир	Vladimir Oblast
Vladivostok	Владивосток	Primorsky Krai
Volchansk	Волчанск	Sverdlovsk Oblast
Volgodonsk	Волгодонск	Rostov Oblast
Volgograd	Волгоград	Volgograd Oblast
Volgorechensk	Волгореченск	Kostroma Oblast
Volkhov	Волхов	Leningrad Oblast
Volodarsk	Володарск	Nizhny Novgorod Oblast
Vologda	Вологда	Vologda Oblast
Volokolamsk	Волоколамск	Moscow Oblast
Volosovo	Волосово	Leningrad Oblast
Volsk	Вольск	Saratov Oblast
Volzhsk	Волжск	Mari El
Volzhsky	Волжский	Volgograd Oblast
Vorkuta	Воркута	Komi Republic
Voronezh	Воронеж	Voronezh Oblast
Vorsma	Ворсма	Nizhny Novgorod Oblast
Voskresensk	Воскресенск	Moscow Oblast
Votkinsk	Воткинск	Udmurtia
Vsevolozhsk	Всеволожск	Leningrad Oblast
Vuktyl	Вуктыл	Komi Republic
Vyatskiye Polyany	Вятские Поляны	Kirov Oblast
Vyazemsky	Вяземский	Khabarovsk Krai
Vyazma	Вязьма	Smolensk Oblast
Vyazniki	Вязники	Vladimir Oblast
Vyborg	Выборг	Leningrad Oblast
Vyksa	Выкса	Nizhny Novgorod Oblast
Vyshny Volochyok	Вышний Волочёк	Tver Oblast
Vysokovsk	Высоковск	Moscow Oblast
Vysotsk	Высоцк	Leningrad Oblast
Vytegra	Вытегра	Vologda Oblast
Yadrin	Ядрин	Chuvash Republic
Yakhroma	Яхрома	Moscow Oblast
Yakutsk	Якутск	Sakha Republic
Yalutorovsk	Ялуторовск	Tyumen Oblast
Yanaul	Янаул	Republic of Bashkortostan
Yaransk	Яранск	Kirov Oblast
Yaroslavl	Ярославль	Yaroslavl Oblast
Yarovoye	Яровое	Altai Krai
Yartsevo	Ярцево	Smolensk Oblast
Yasnogorsk	Ясногорск	Tula Oblast
Yasny	Ясный	Orenburg Oblast
Yefremov	Ефремов	Tula Oblast
Yegoryevsk	Егорьевск	Moscow Oblast
Yekaterinburg	Екатеринбург	Sverdlovsk Oblast
Yelabuga	Елабуга	Republic of Tatarstan
Yelets	Елец	Lipetsk Oblast
Yelizovo	Елизово	Kamchatka Krai
Yelnya	Ельня	Smolensk Oblast
Yemanzhelinsk	Еманжелинск	Chelyabinsk Oblast
Yemva	Емва	Komi Republic
Yeniseysk	Енисейск	Krasnoyarsk Krai
Yermolino	Ермолино	Kaluga Oblast
Yershov	Ершов	Saratov Oblast
Yessentuki	Ессентуки	Stavropol Krai
Yeysk	Ейск	Krasnodar Krai
Yoshkar-Ola	Йошкар-Ола	Mari El
Yubileyny	Юбилейный	Moscow Oblast
Yugorsk	Югорск	Khanty-Mansi Autonomous Okrug
Yukhnov	Юхнов	Kaluga Oblast
Yurga	Юрга	Kemerovo Oblast
Yuryevets	Юрьевец	Ivanovo Oblast
Yuryev-Polsky	Юрьев-Польский	Vladimir Oblast
Yuryuzan	Юрюзань	Chelyabinsk Oblast
Yuzha	Южа	Ivanovo Oblast
Yuzhno-Sakhalinsk	Южно-Сахалинск	Sakhalin Oblast
Yuzhno-Sukhokumsk	Южно-Сухокумск	Dagestan
Yuzhnouralsk	Южноуральск	Chelyabinsk Oblast
Zadonsk	Задонск	Lipetsk Oblast
Zainsk	Заинск	Republic of Tatarstan
Zakamensk	Закаменск	Republic of Buryatia
Zaozyorny	Заозёрный	Krasnoyarsk Krai
Zaozyorsk	Заозёрск	Murmansk Oblast
Zapadnaya Dvina	Западная Двина	Tver Oblast
Zapolyarny	Заполярный	Murmansk Oblast
Zaraysk	Зарайск	Moscow Oblast
Zarechny	Заречный	Penza Oblast
Zarechny	Заречный	Sverdlovsk Oblast
Zarinsk	Заринск	Altai Krai
Zavitinsk	Завитинск	Amur Oblast
Zavodoukovsk	Заводоуковск	Tyumen Oblast
Zavolzhsk	Заволжск	Ivanovo Oblast
Zavolzhye	Заволжье	Nizhny Novgorod Oblast
Zelenodolsk	Зеленодольск	Republic of Tatarstan
Zelenogorsk	Зеленогорск	Krasnoyarsk Krai
Zelenogorsk	Зеленогорск	Saint Petersburg
Zelenograd	Зеленоград	Moscow
Zelenogradsk	Зеленоградск	Kaliningrad Oblast
Zelenokumsk	Зеленокумск	Stavropol Krai
Zernograd	Зерноград	Rostov Oblast
Zeya	Зея	Amur Oblast
Zheleznodorozhny	Железнодорожный	Moscow Oblast
Zheleznogorsk	Железногорск	Krasnoyarsk Krai
Zheleznogorsk	Железногорск	Kursk Oblast
Zheleznogorsk-Ilimsky	Железногорск-Илимский	Irkutsk Oblast
Zheleznovodsk	Железноводск	Stavropol Krai
Zherdevka	Жердевка	Tambov Oblast
Zhigulyovsk	Жигулёвск	Samara Oblast
Zhirnovsk	Жирновск	Volgograd Oblast
Zhizdra	Жиздра	Kaluga Oblast
Zhukov	Жуков	Kaluga Oblast
Zhukovka	Жуковка	Bryansk Oblast
Zhukovsky	Жуковский	Moscow Oblast
Zima	Зима	Irkutsk Oblast
Zlatoust	Златоуст	Chelyabinsk Oblast
Zlynka	Злынка	Bryansk Oblast
Zmeinogorsk	Змеиногорск	Altai Krai
Znamensk	Знаменск	Astrakhan Oblast
Zubtsov	Зубцов	Tver Oblast
Zuyevka	Зуевка	Kirov Oblast
Zvenigorod	Звенигород	Moscow Oblast
Zvenigovo	Звенигово	Mari El
Zverevo	Зверево	Rostov Oblast

== Gallery ==
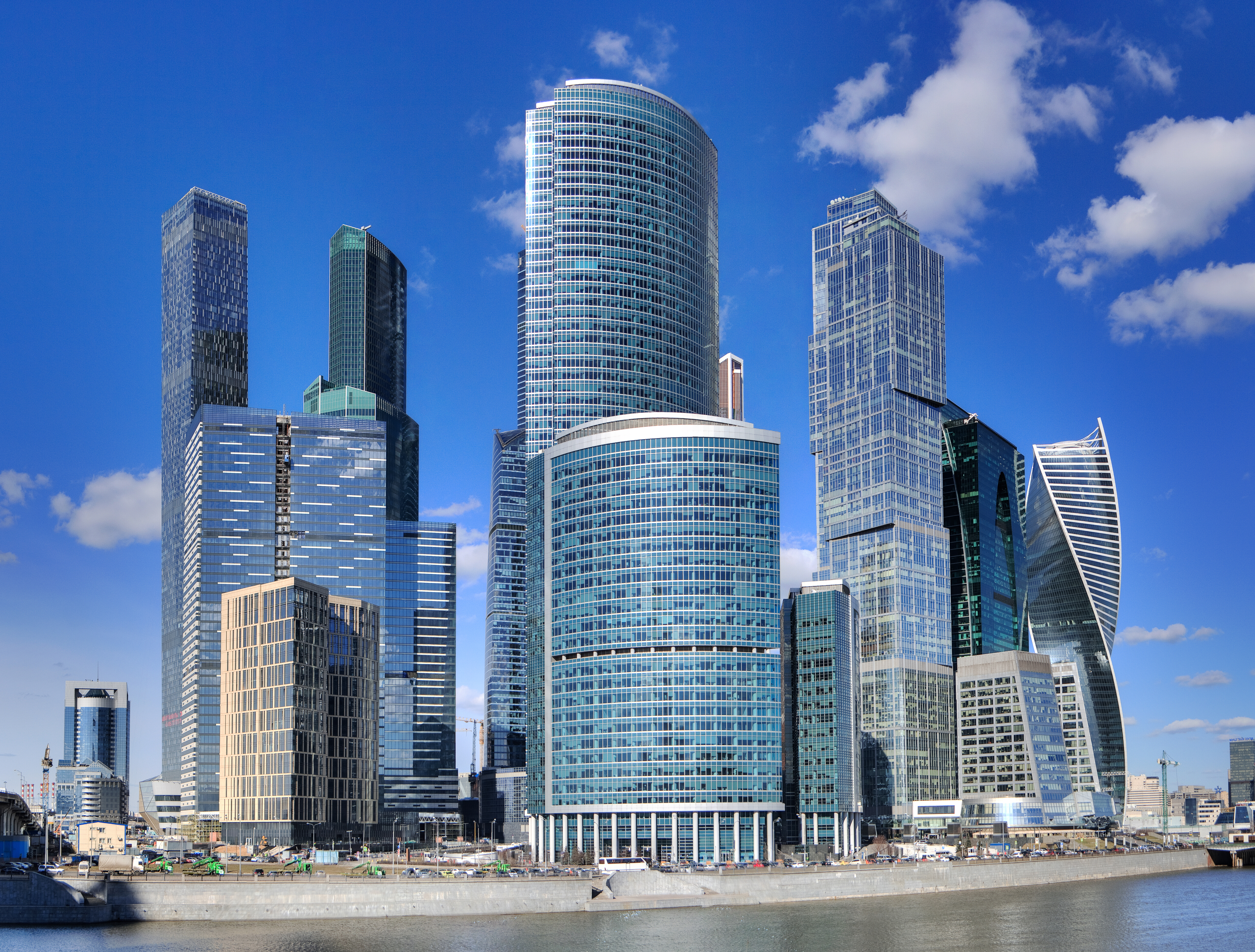
1. Moscow

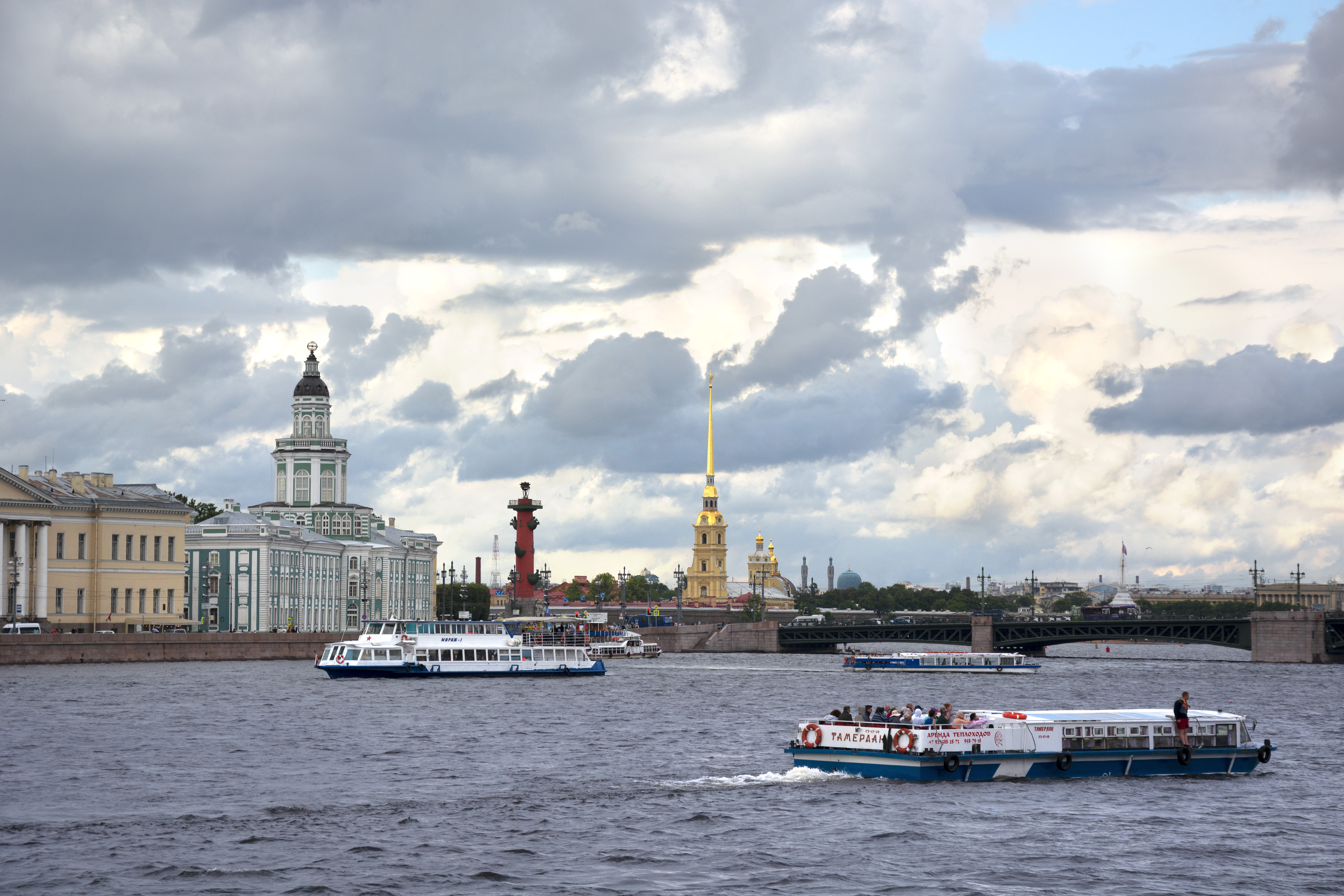
2. Saint Petersburg

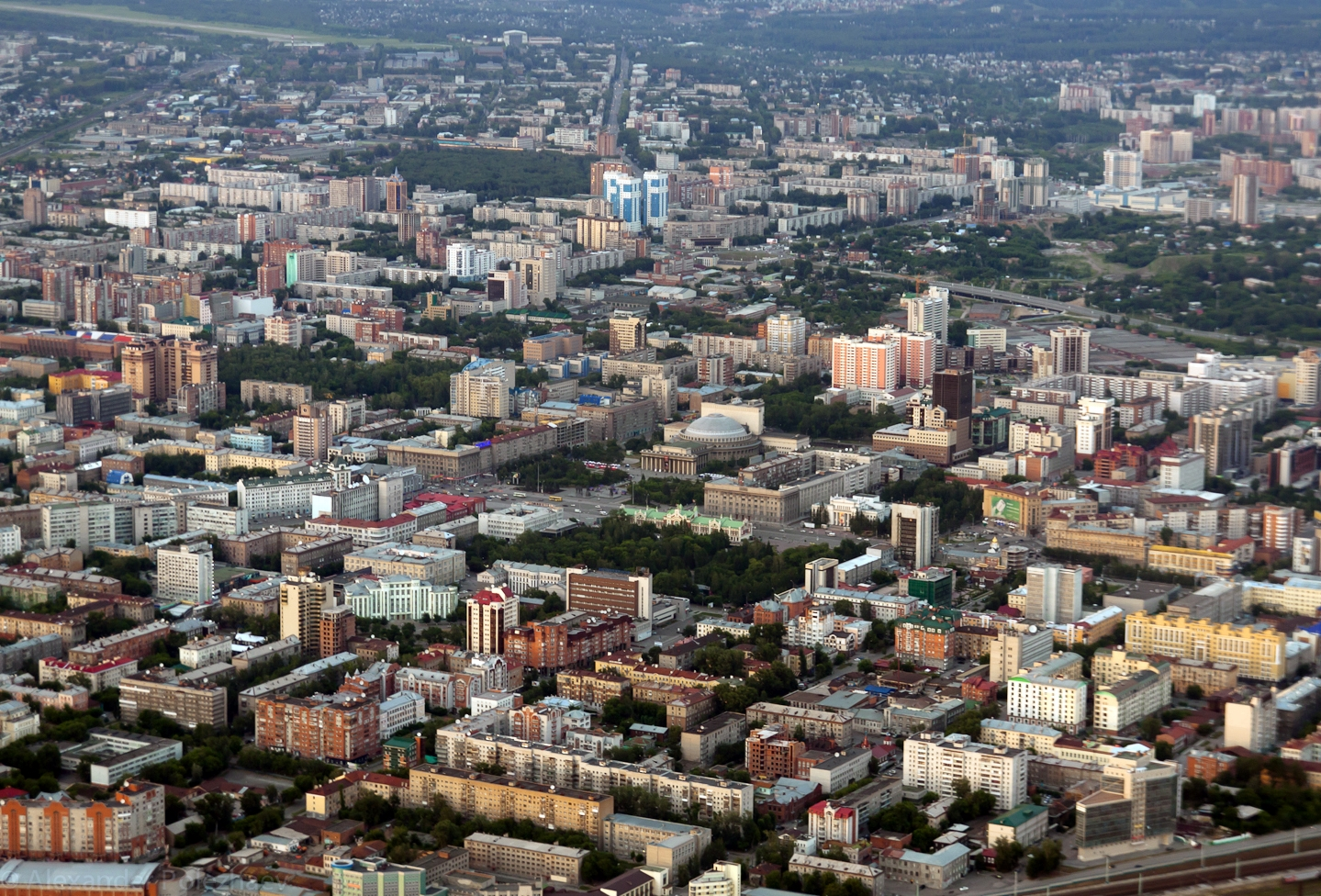
3. Novosibirsk

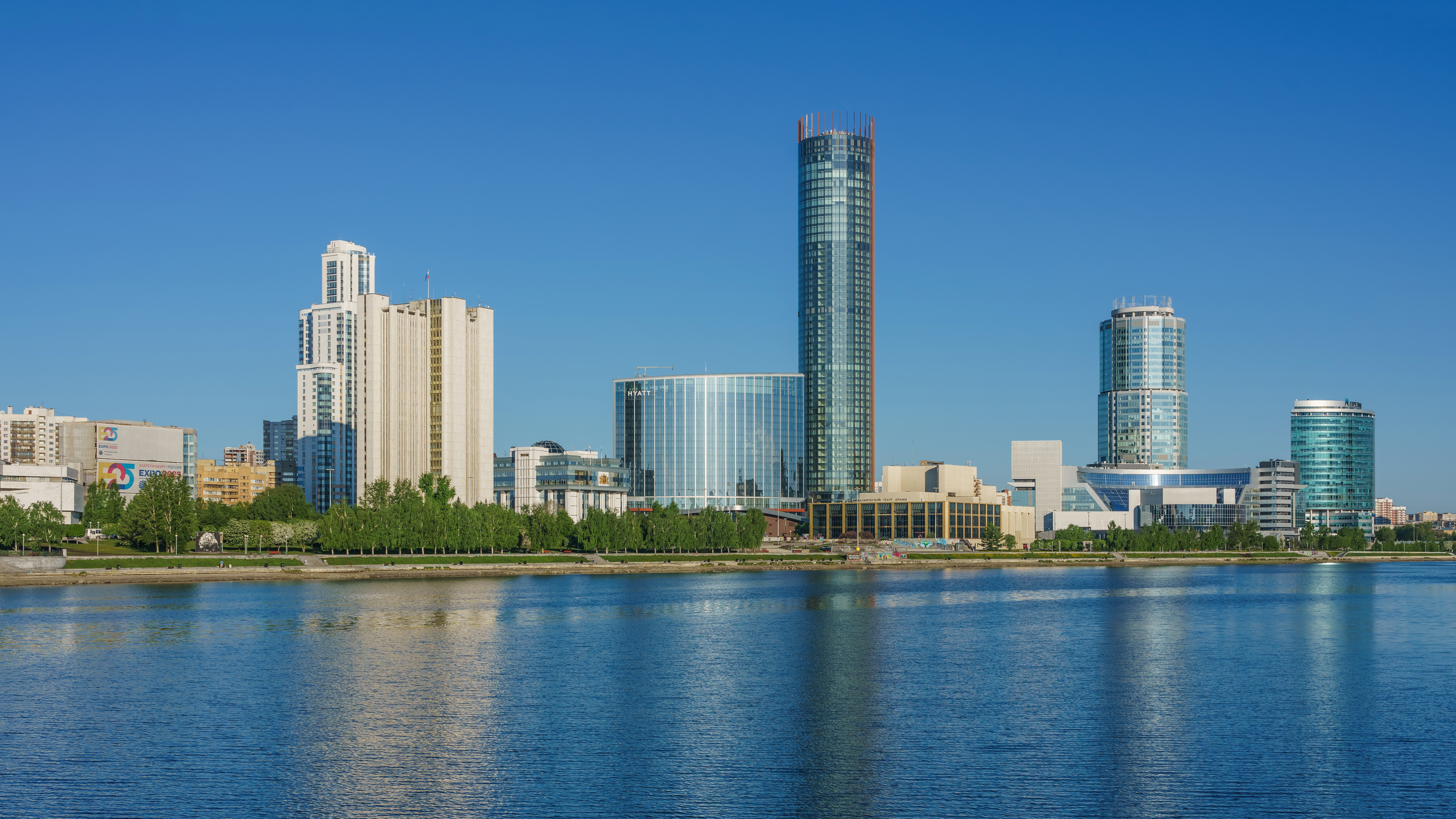
4. Yekaterinburg

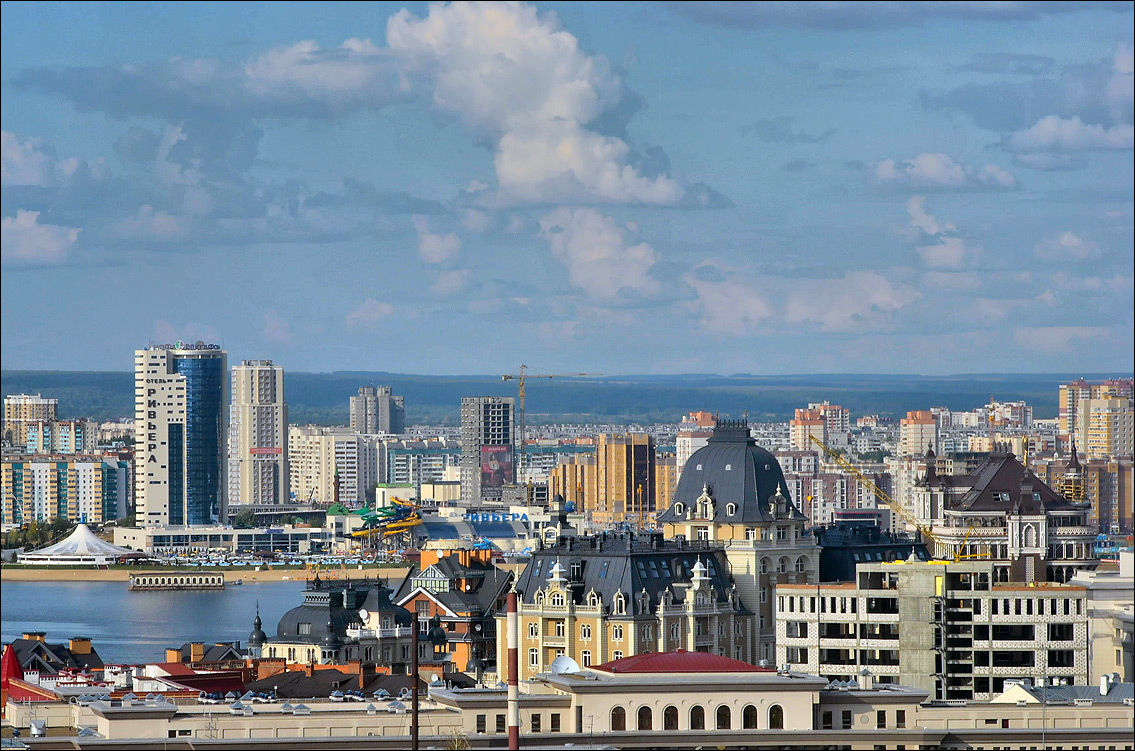
5. Kazan

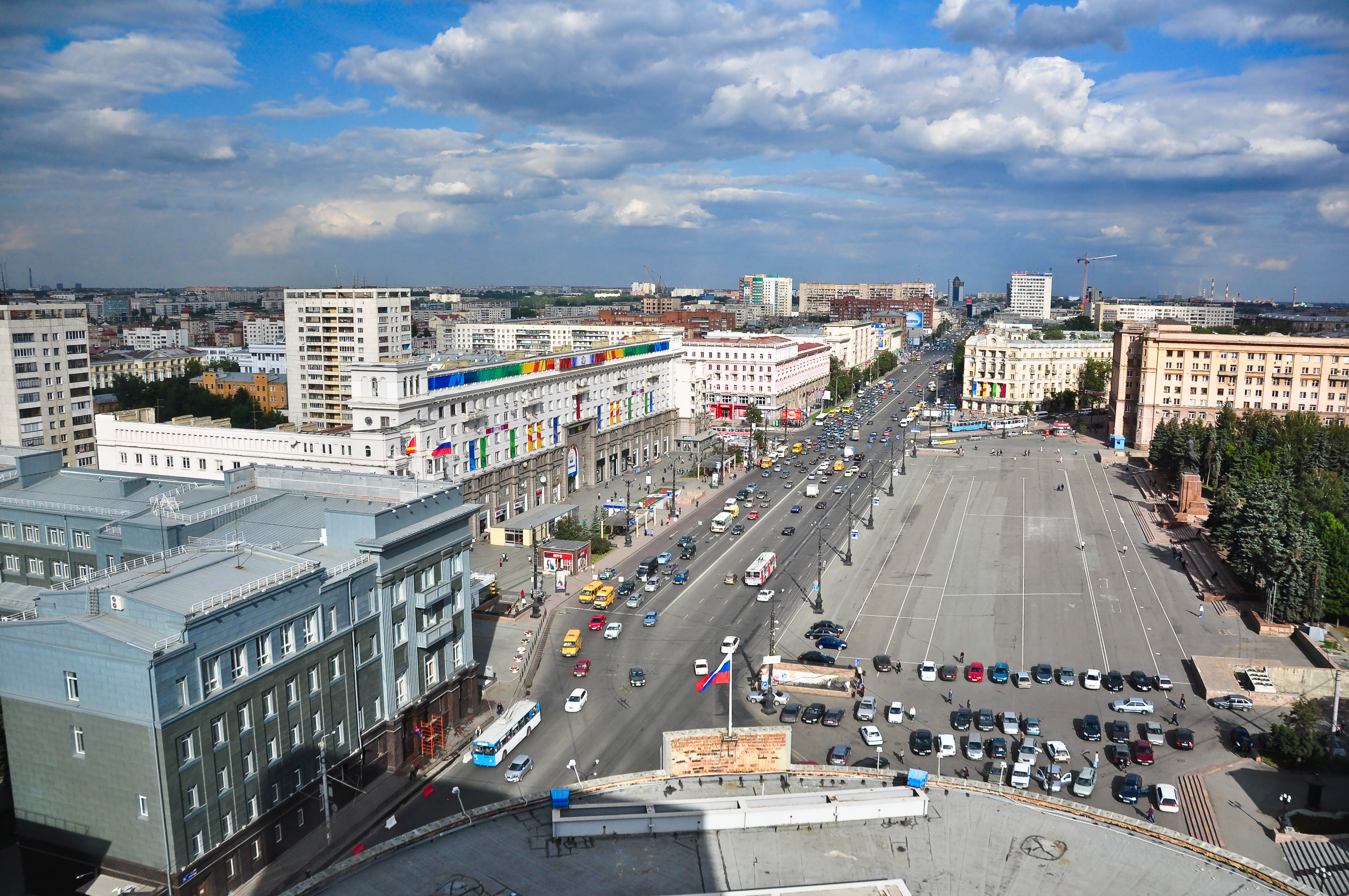
6. Chelyabinsk

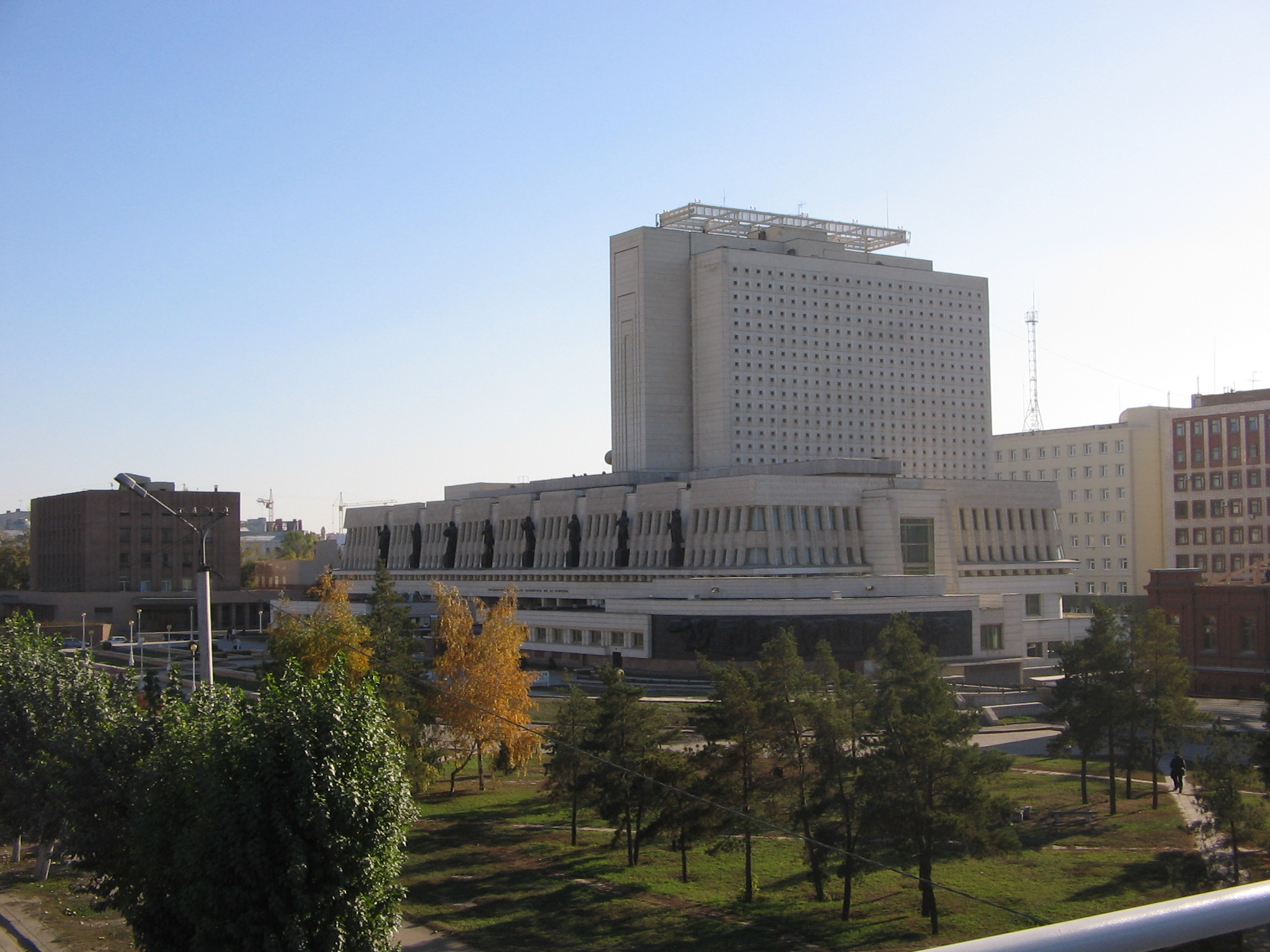
7. Omsk

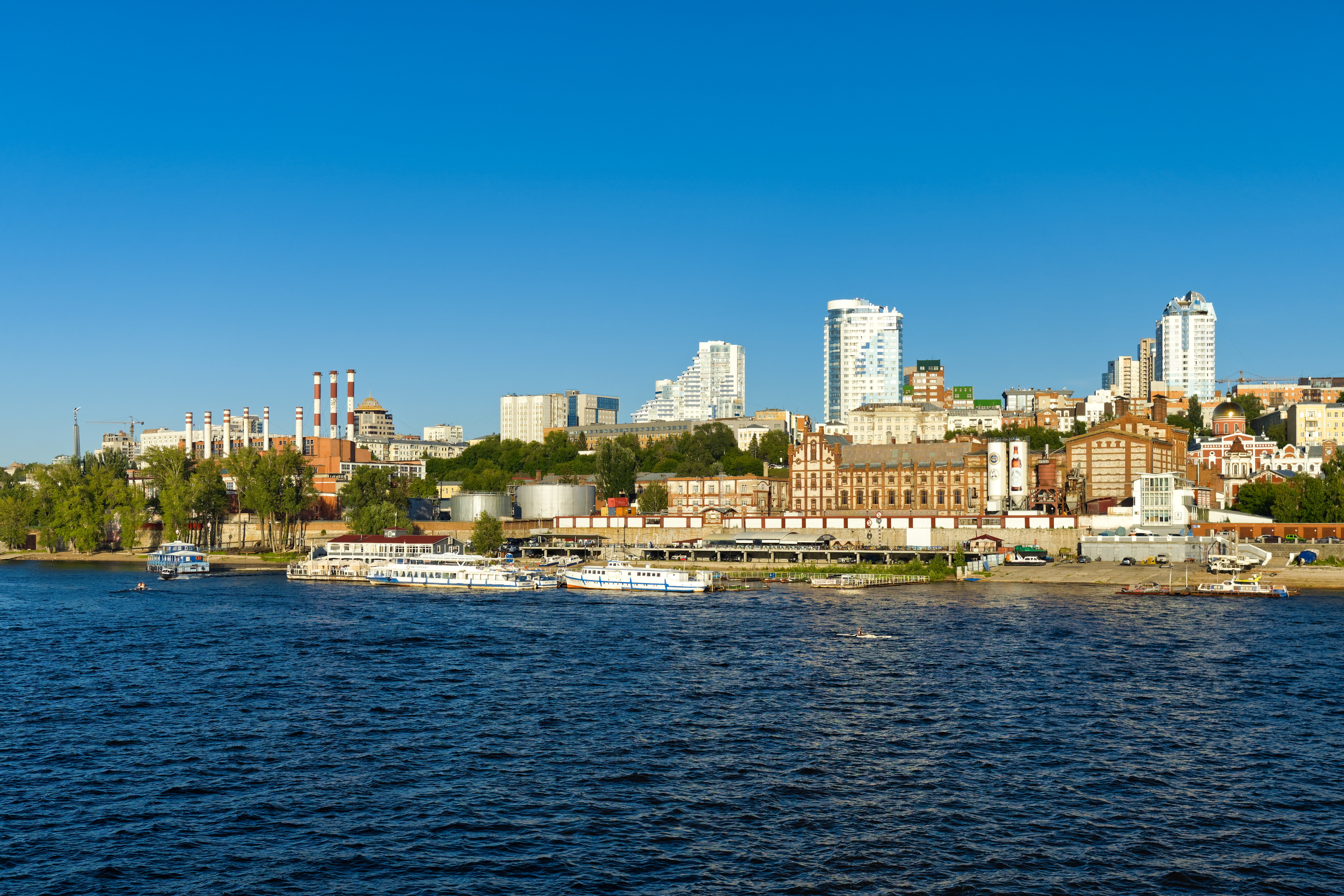
8. Samara

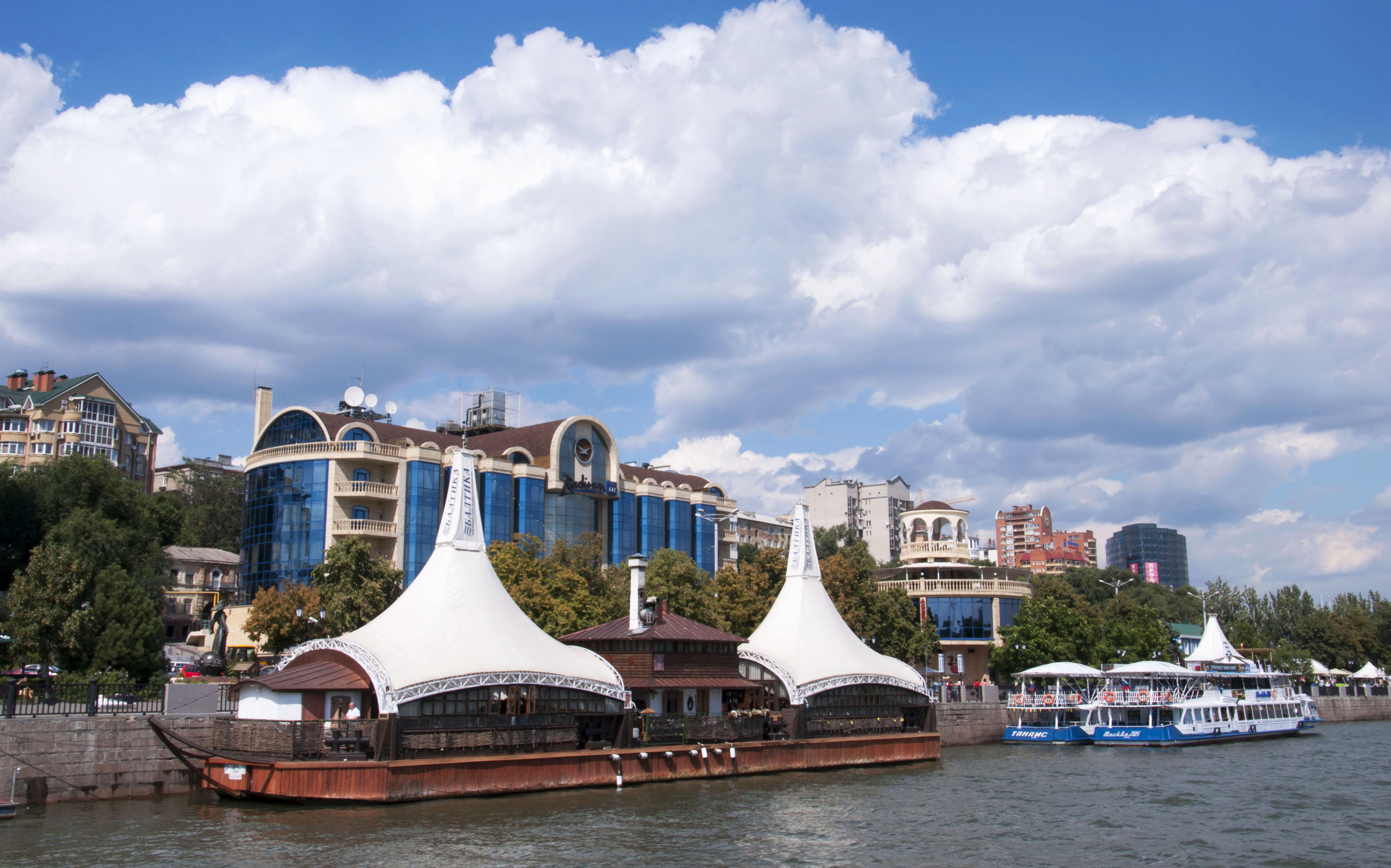
9. Rostov-on-Don

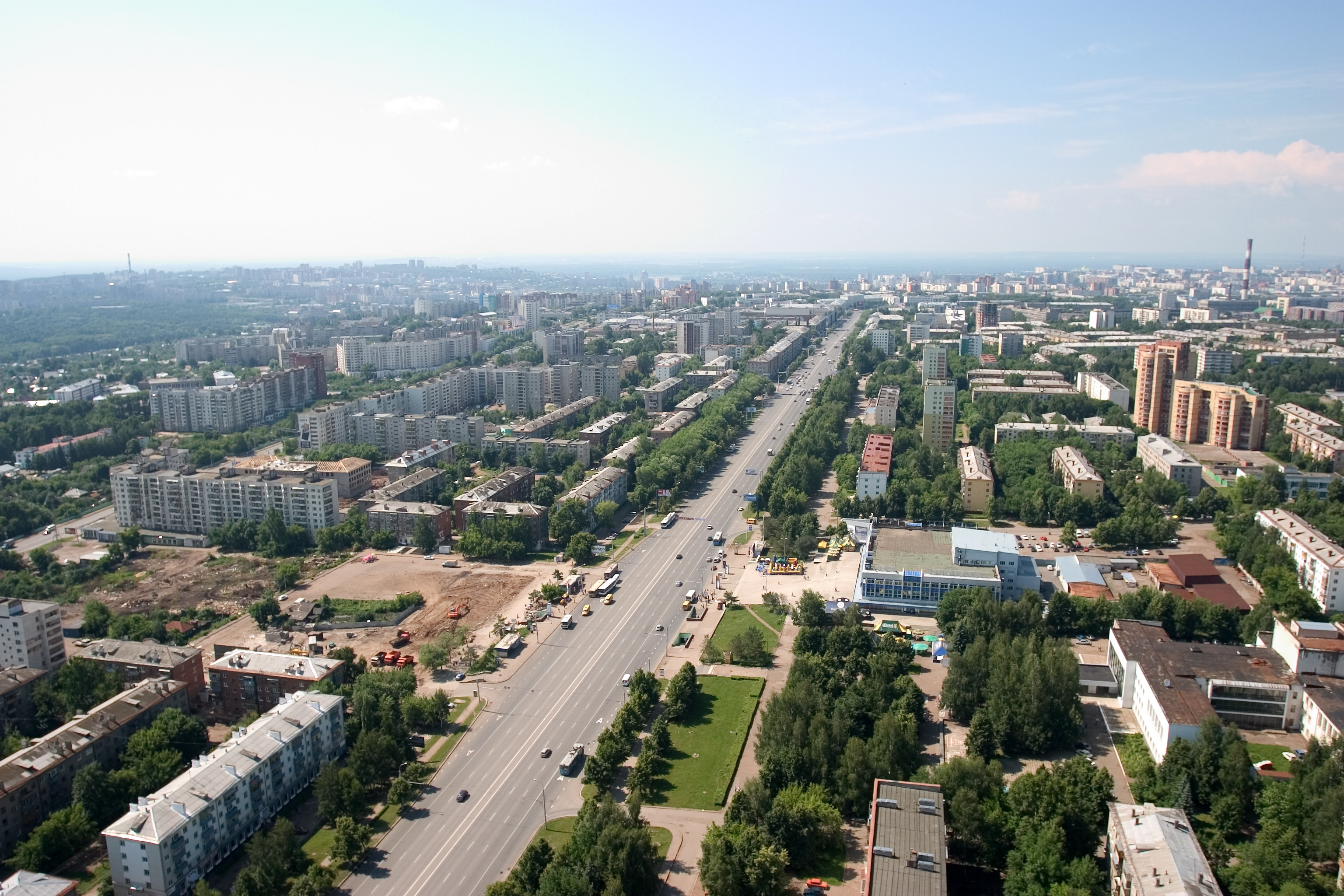
10. Ufa

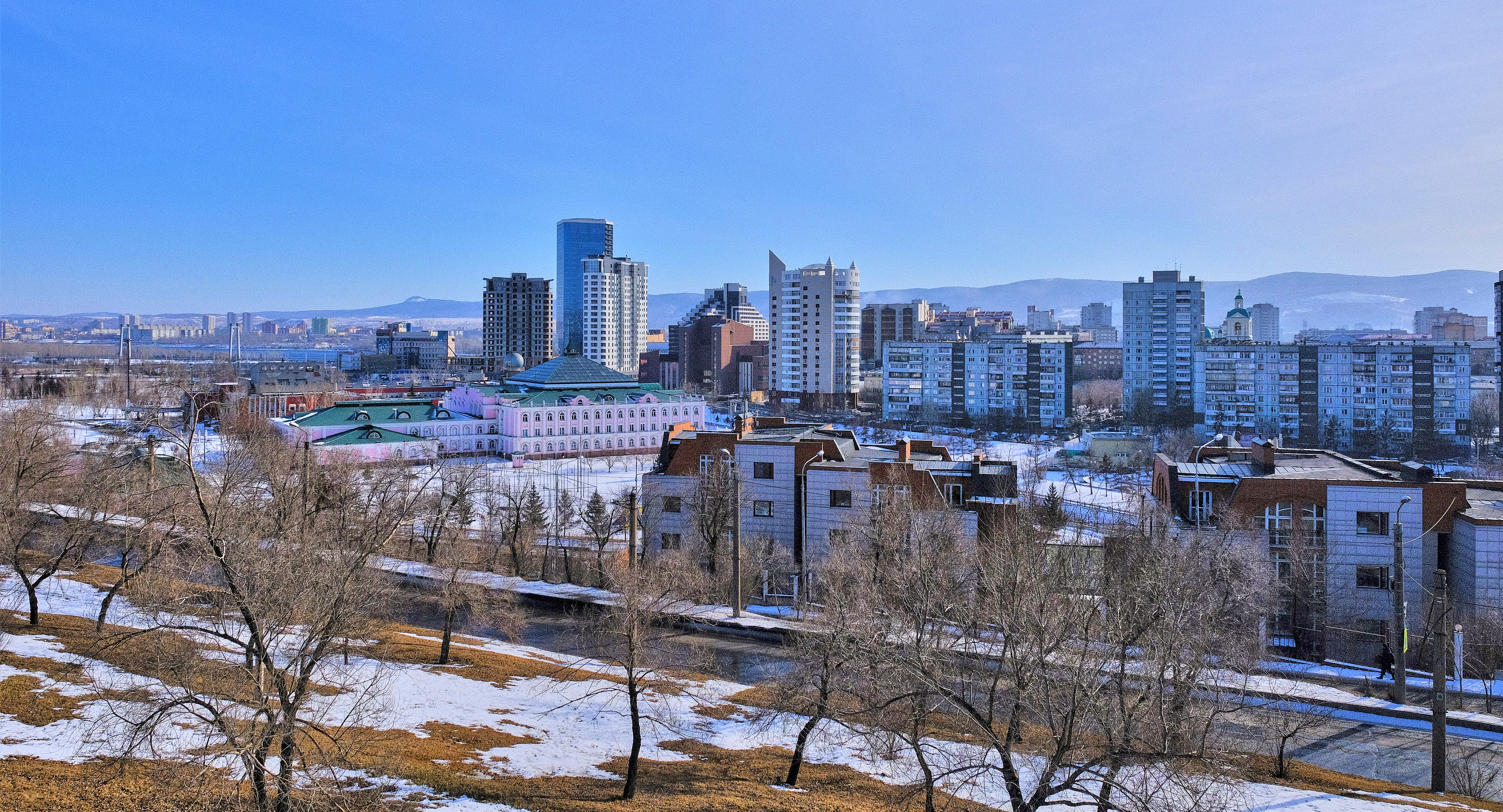
11. Krasnoyarsk

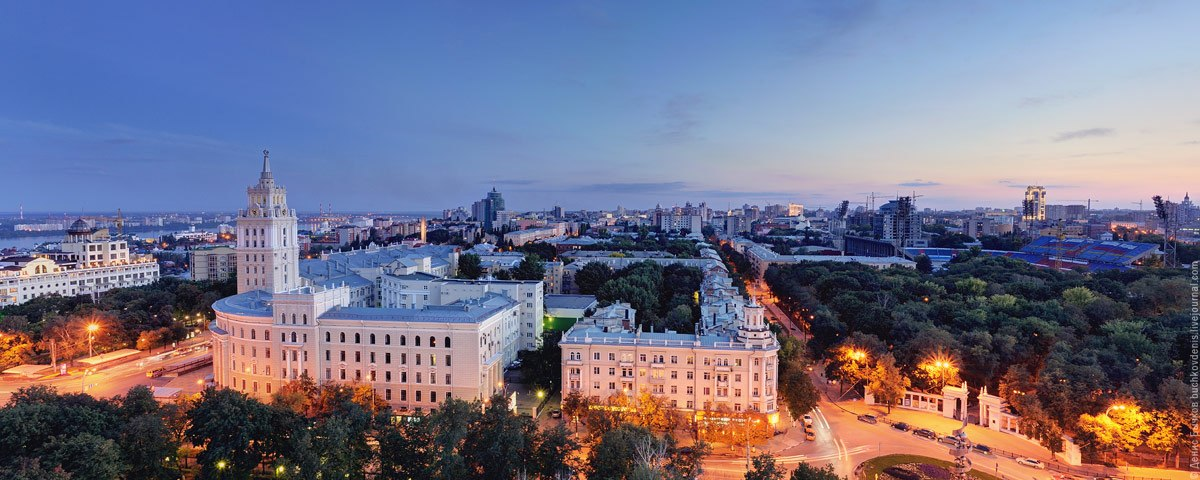
13. Voronezh

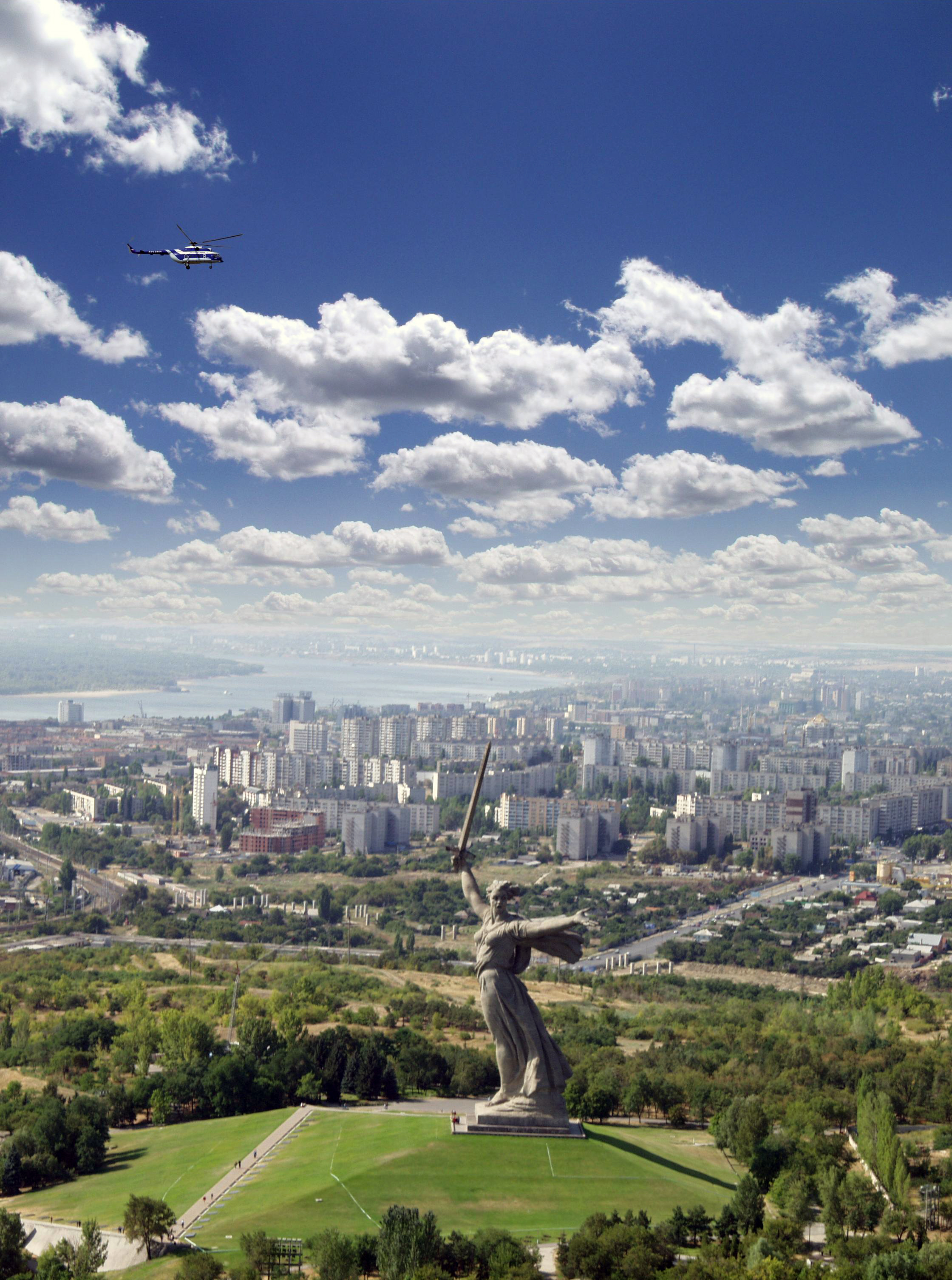
14. Volgograd

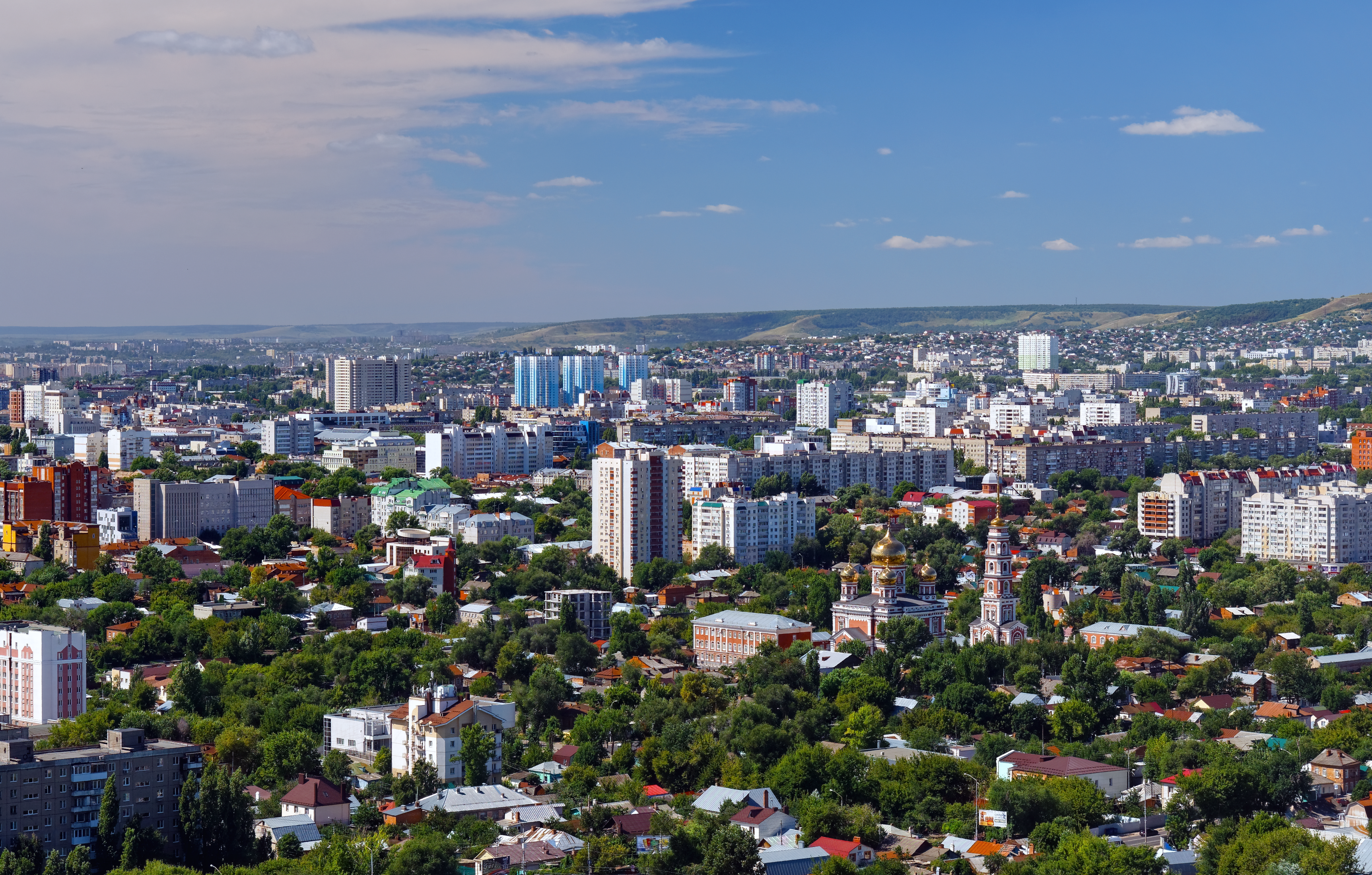
15. Saratov

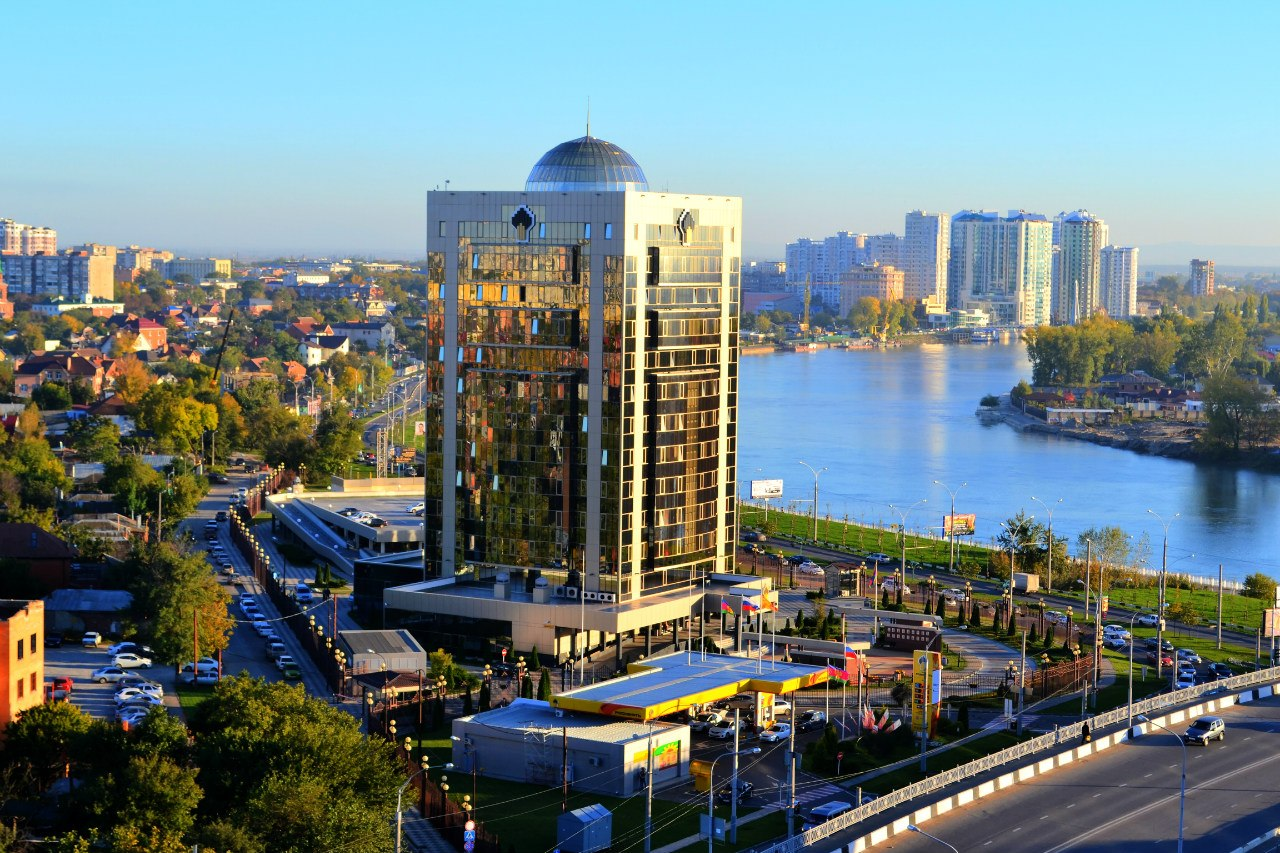
16. Krasnodar

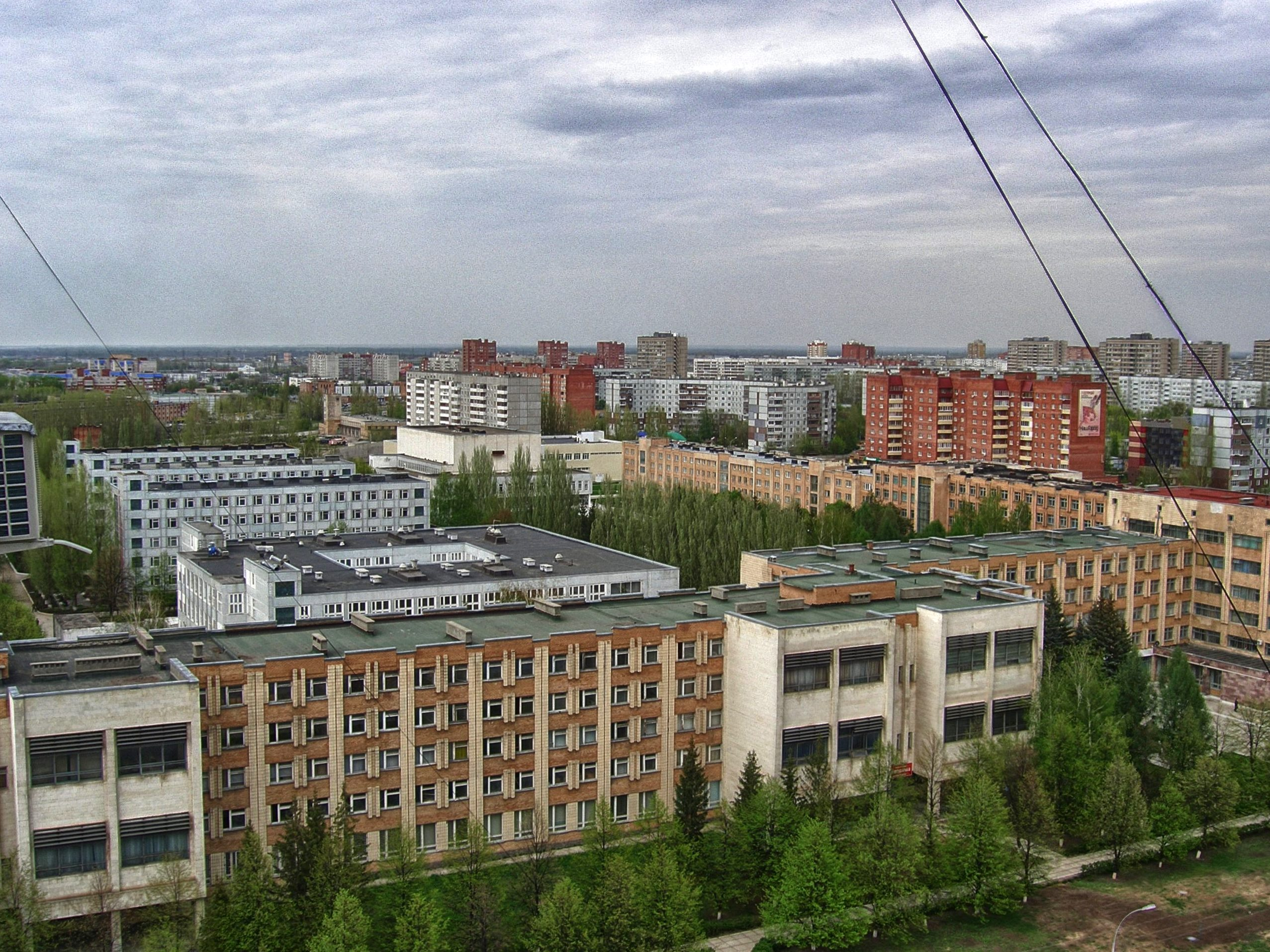
17. Tolyatti

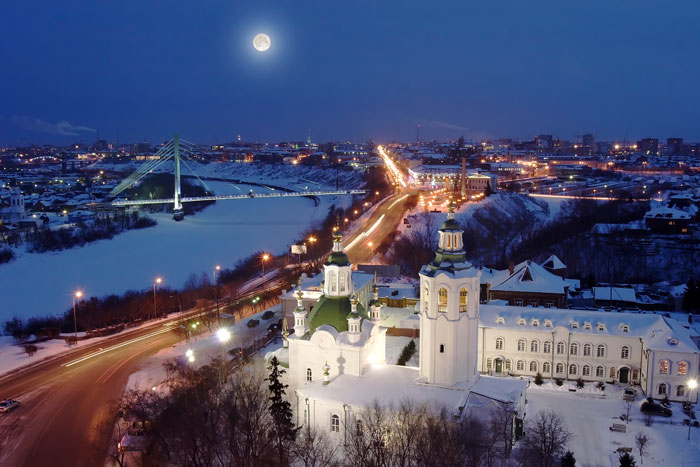
18. Tyumen

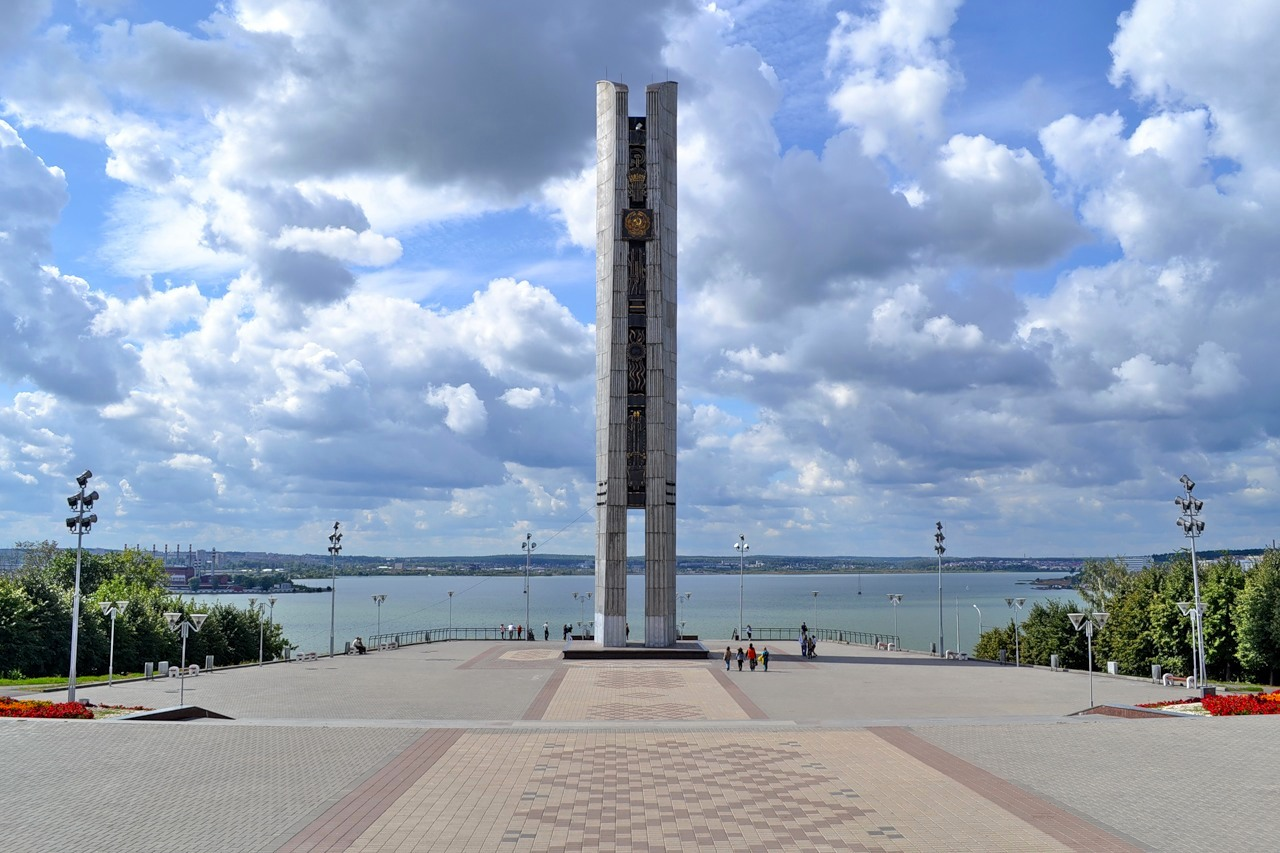
19. Izhevsk

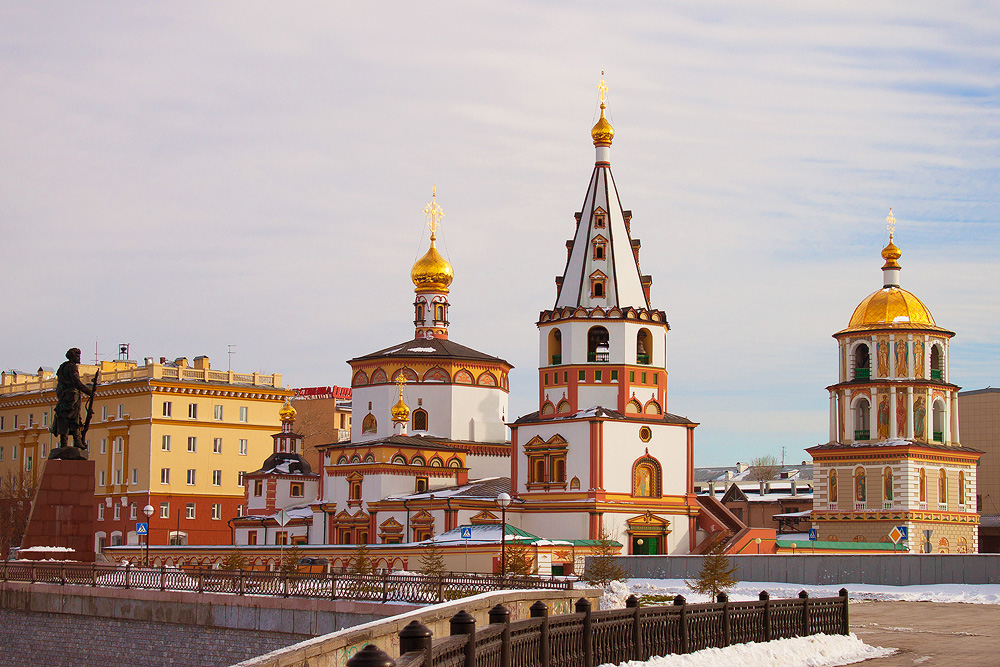
20. Irkutsk

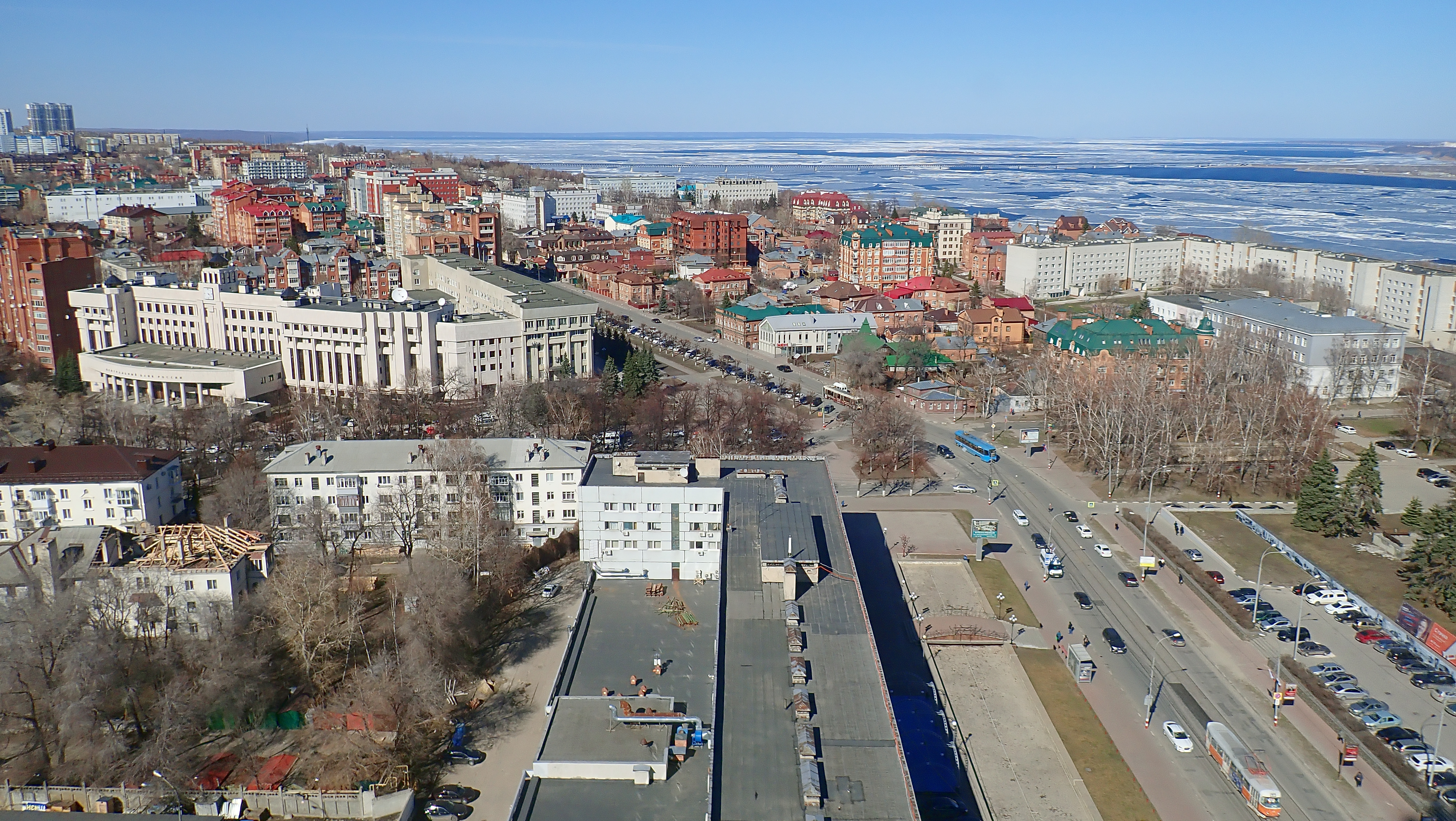
21. Ulyanovsk

22. Khabarovsk

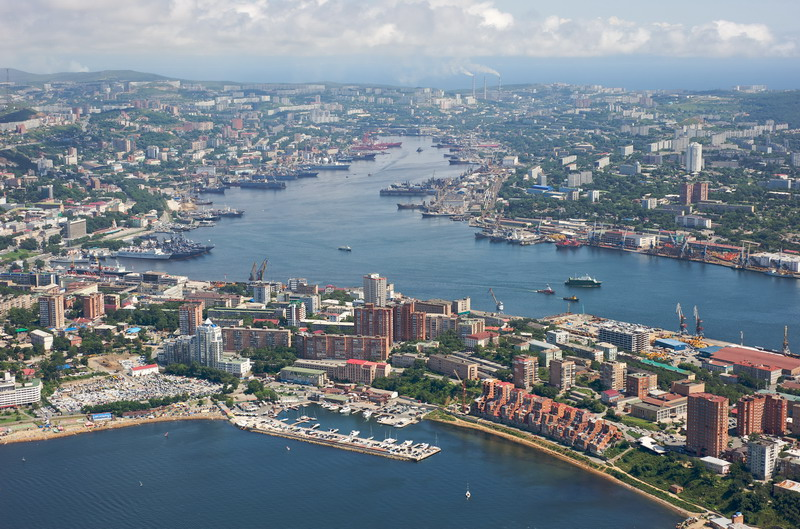
23. Vladivostok

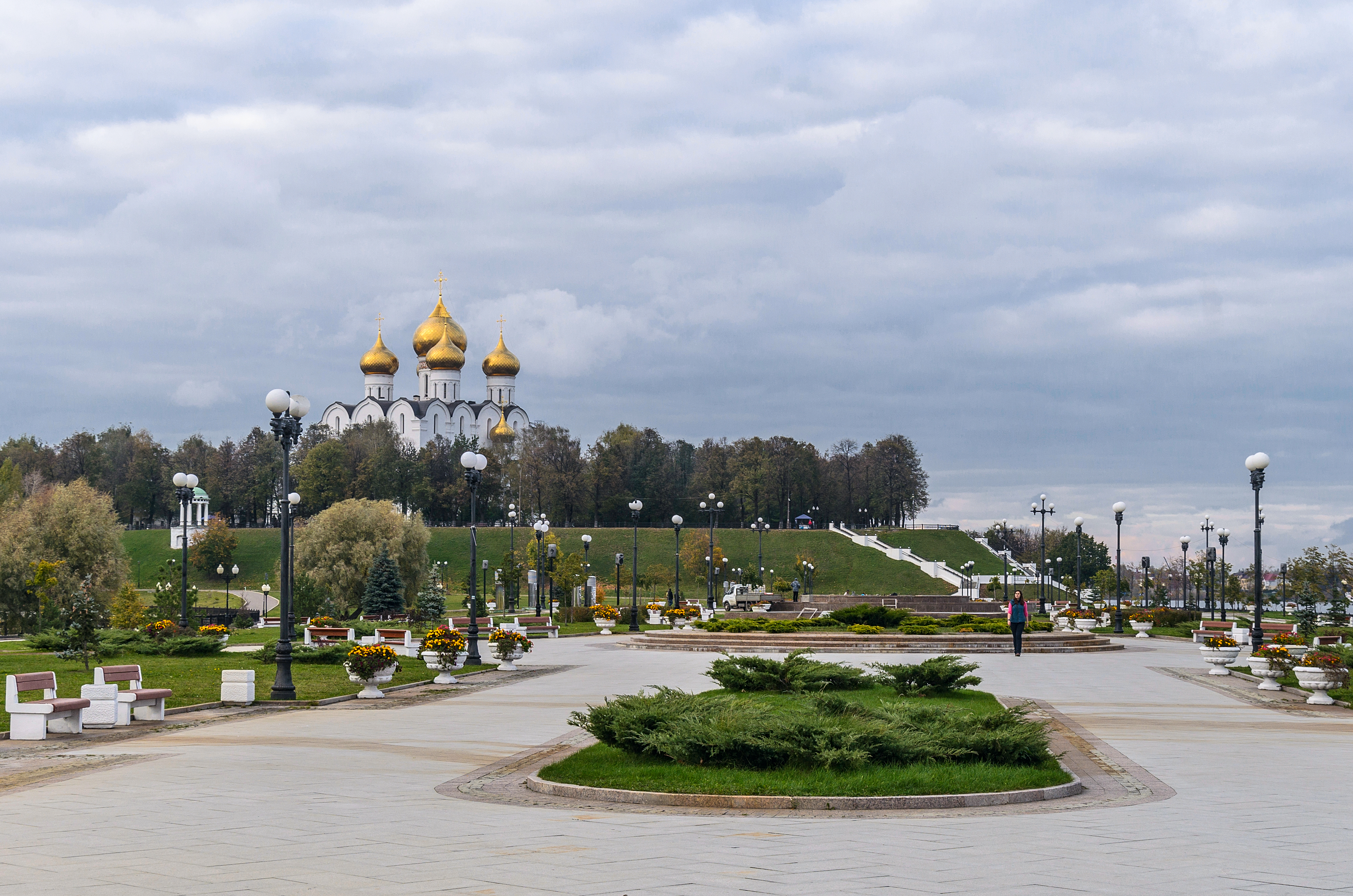
24. Yaroslavl

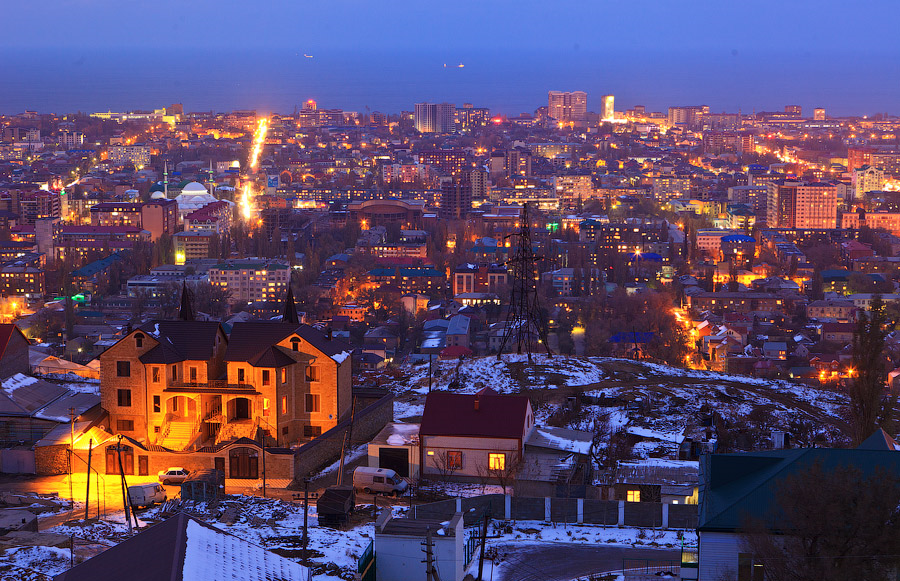
25. Makhachkala

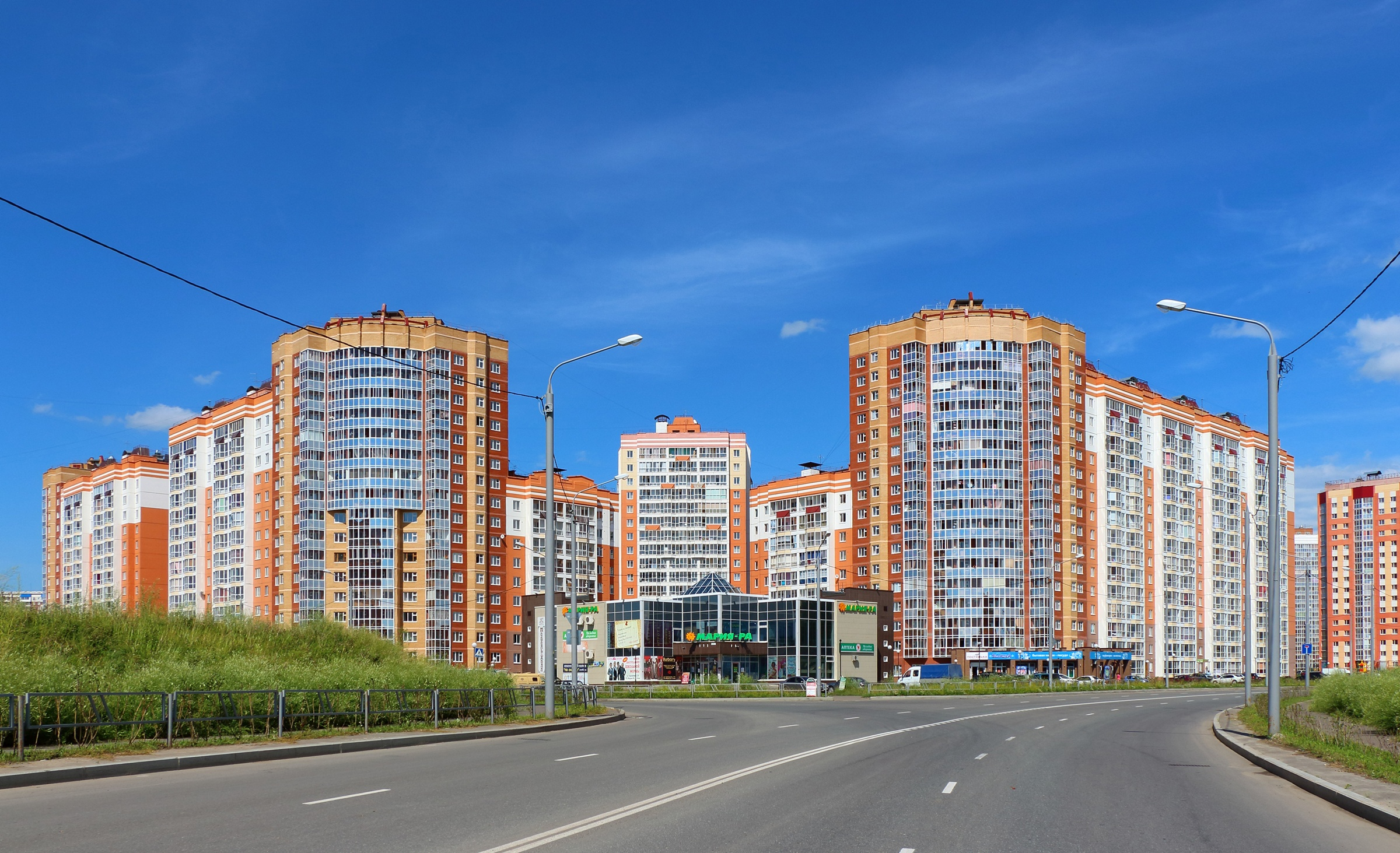
26. Tomsk

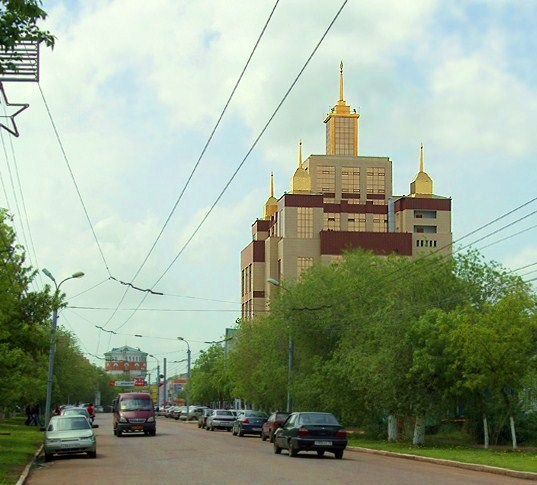
27. Orenburg

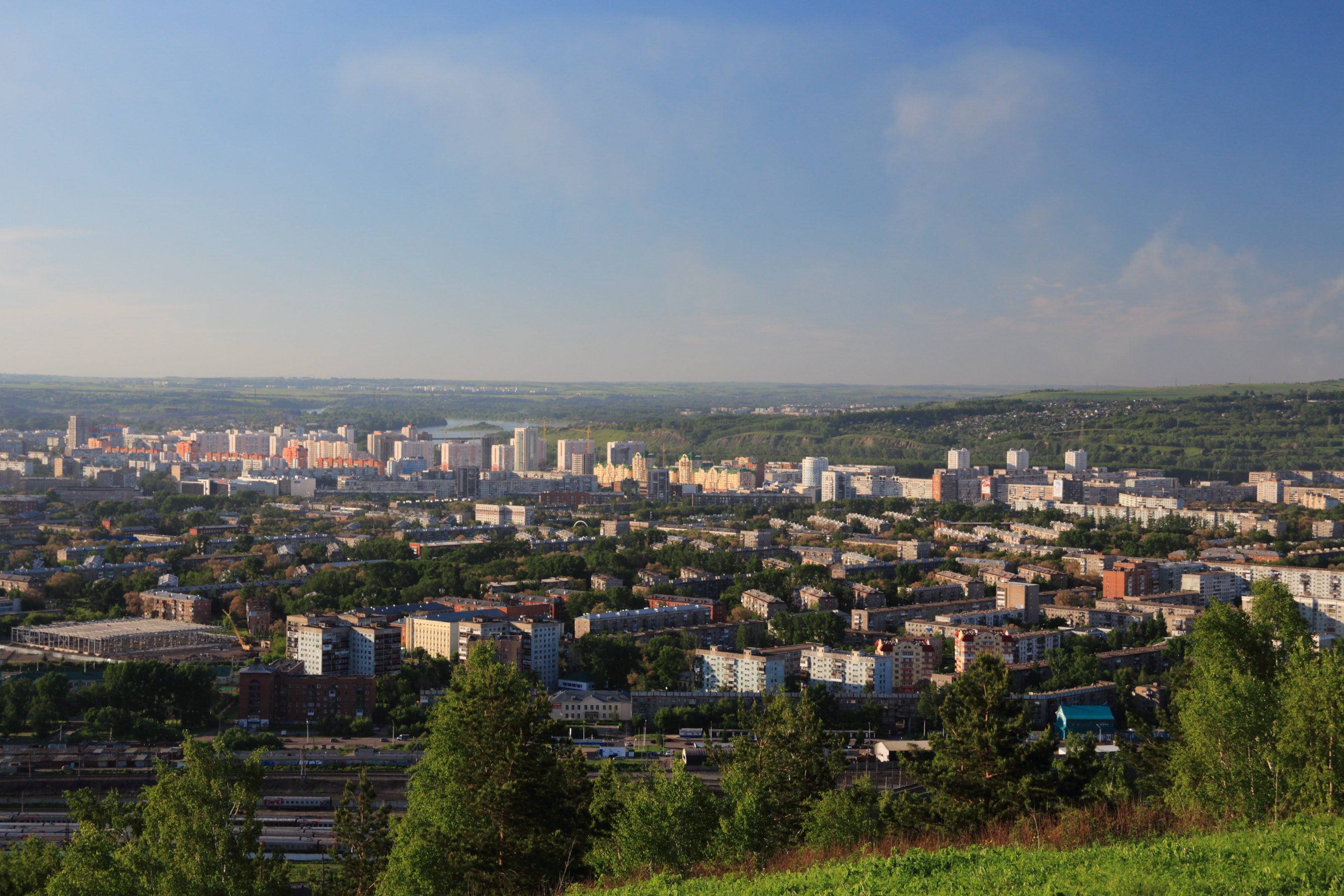
28. Novokuznetsk

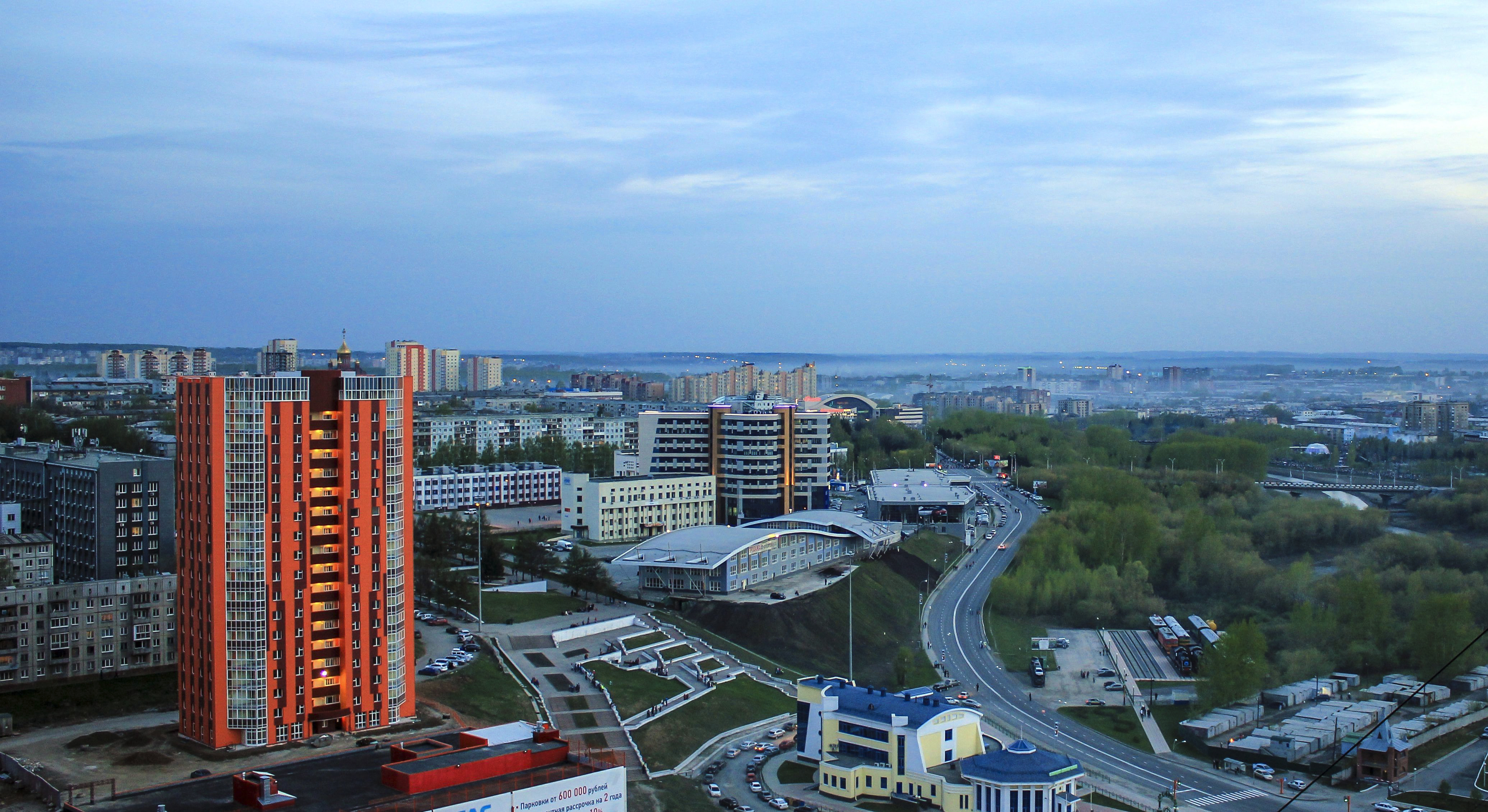
29. Kemerovo

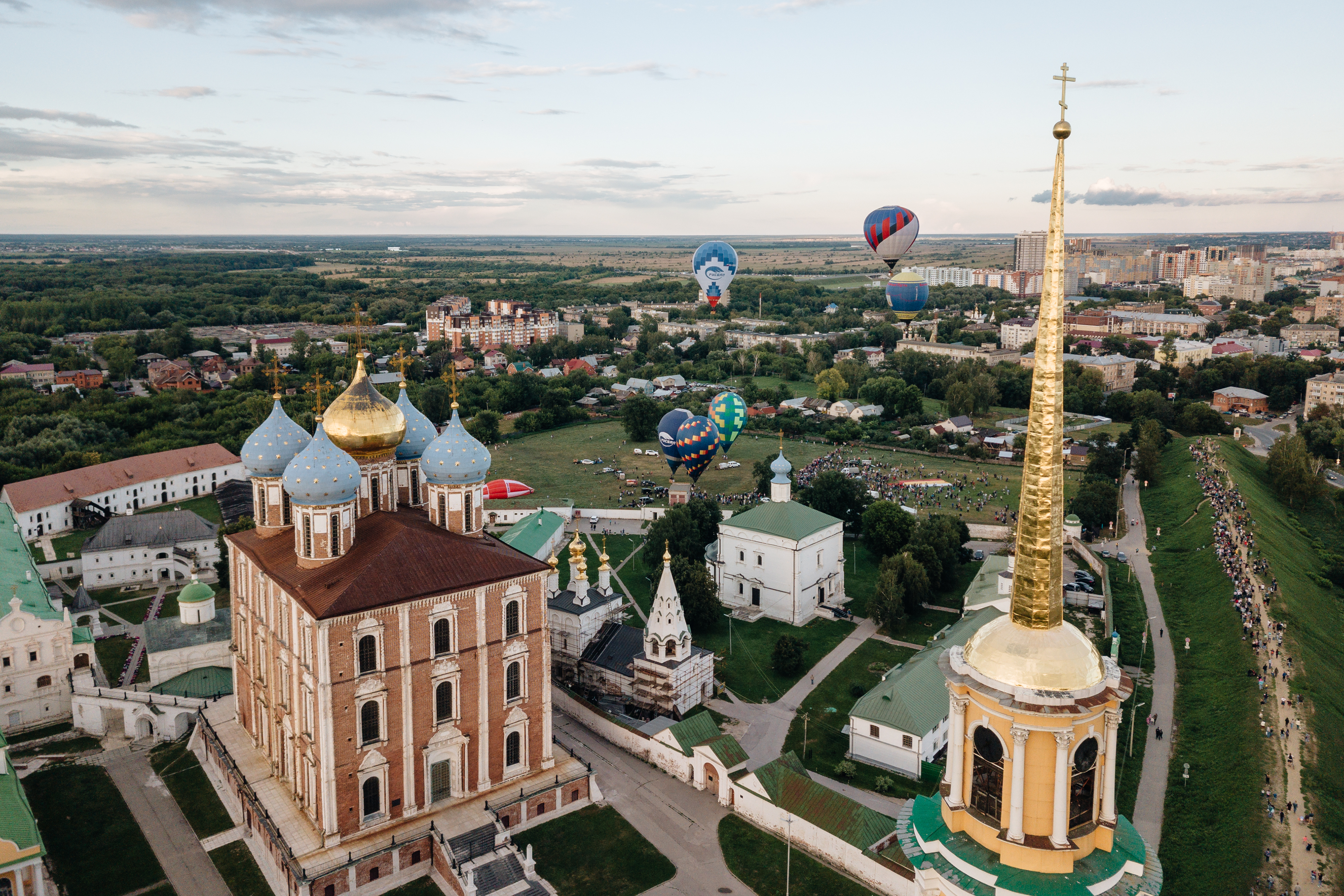
30. Ryazan

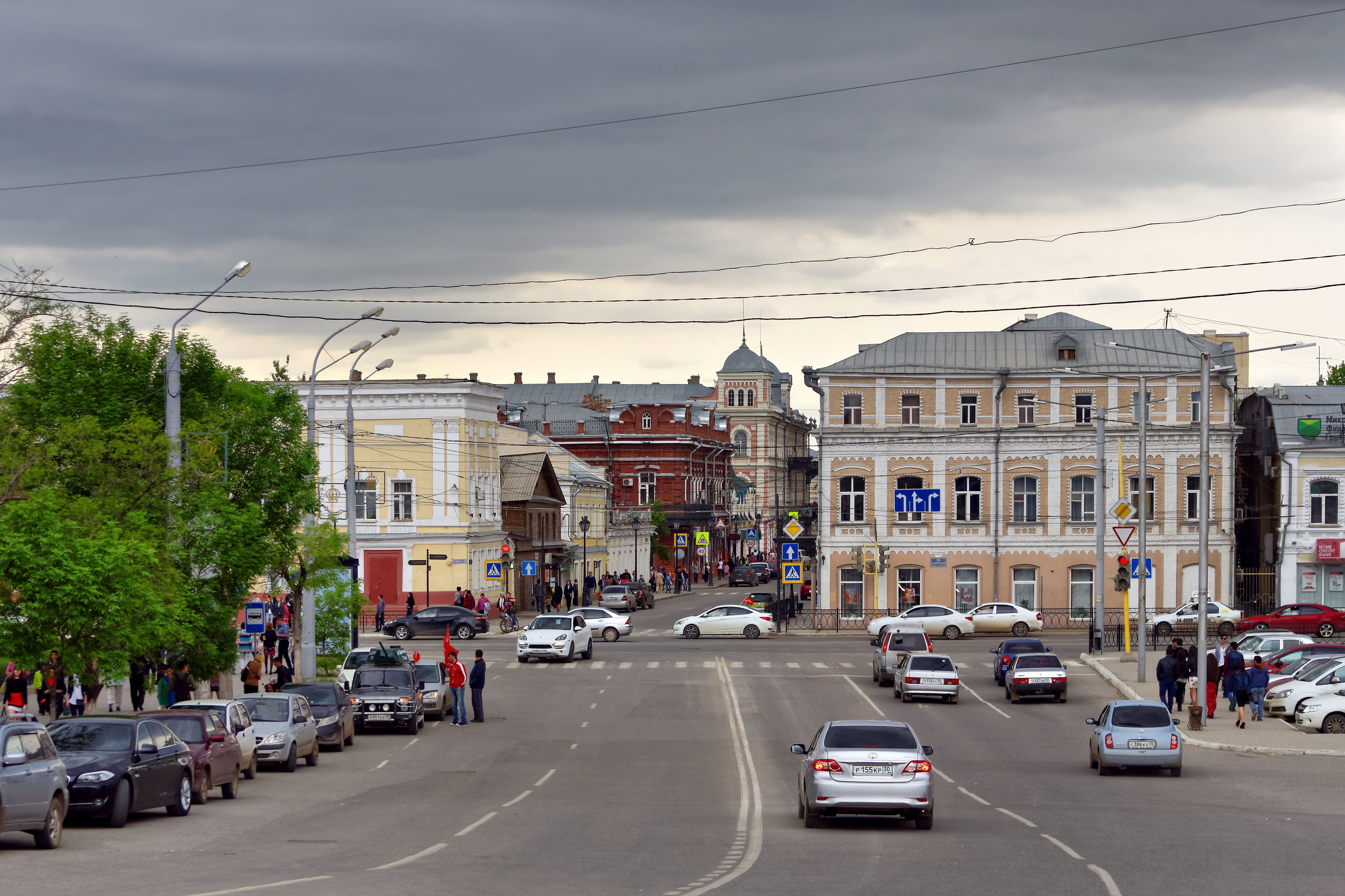
31. Astrakhan

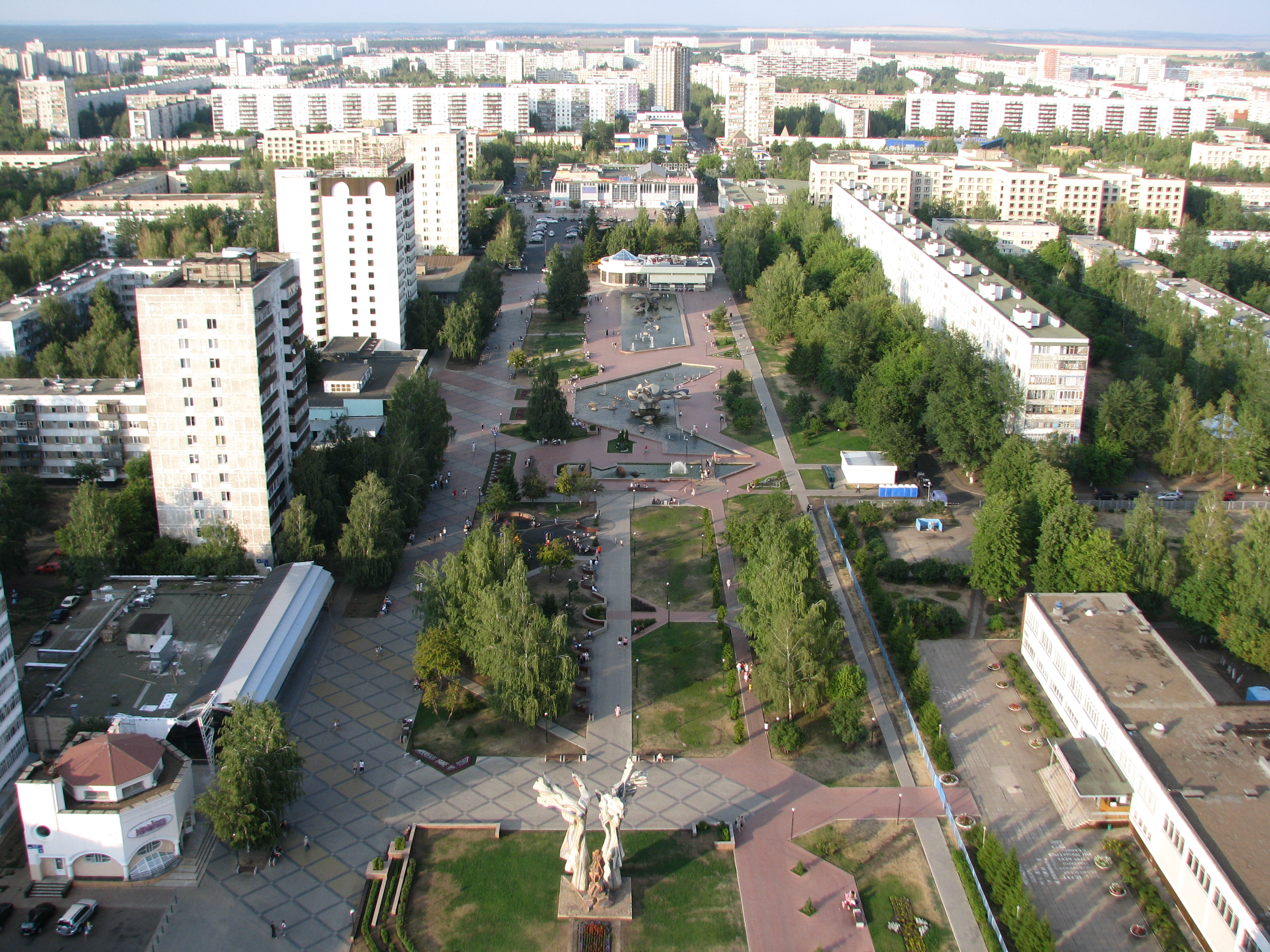
32. Naberezhnye Chelny

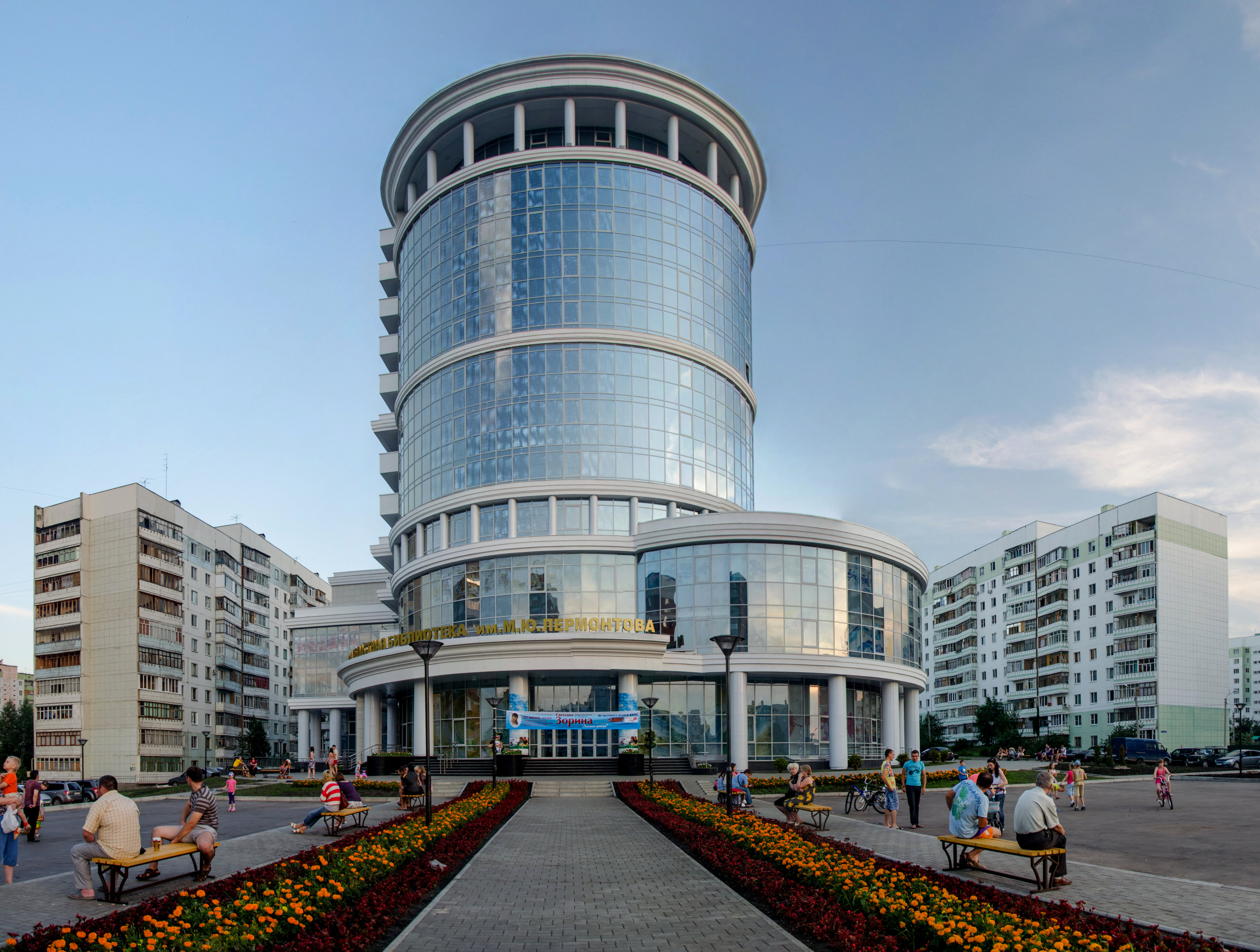
33. Penza

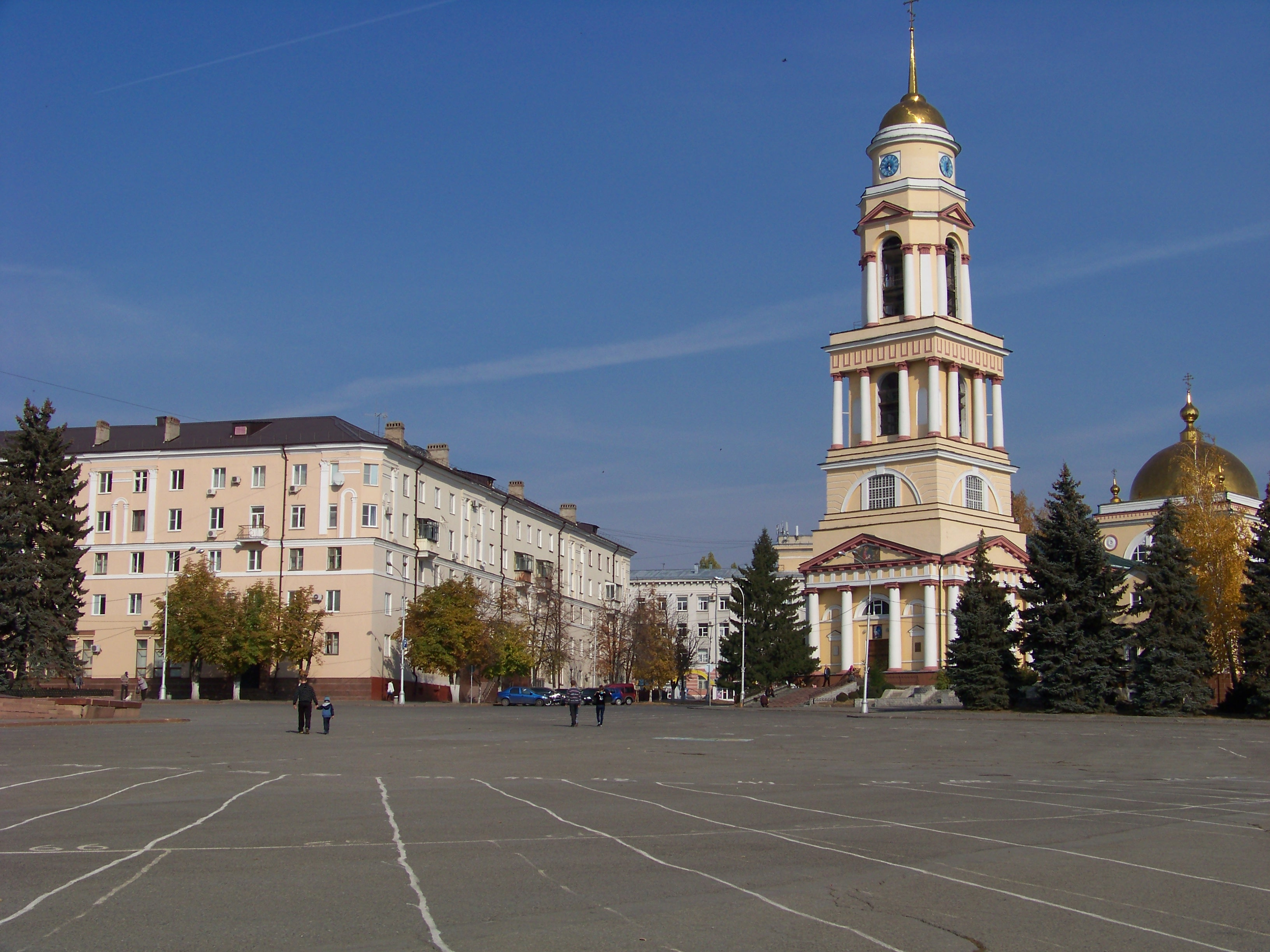
34. Lipetsk

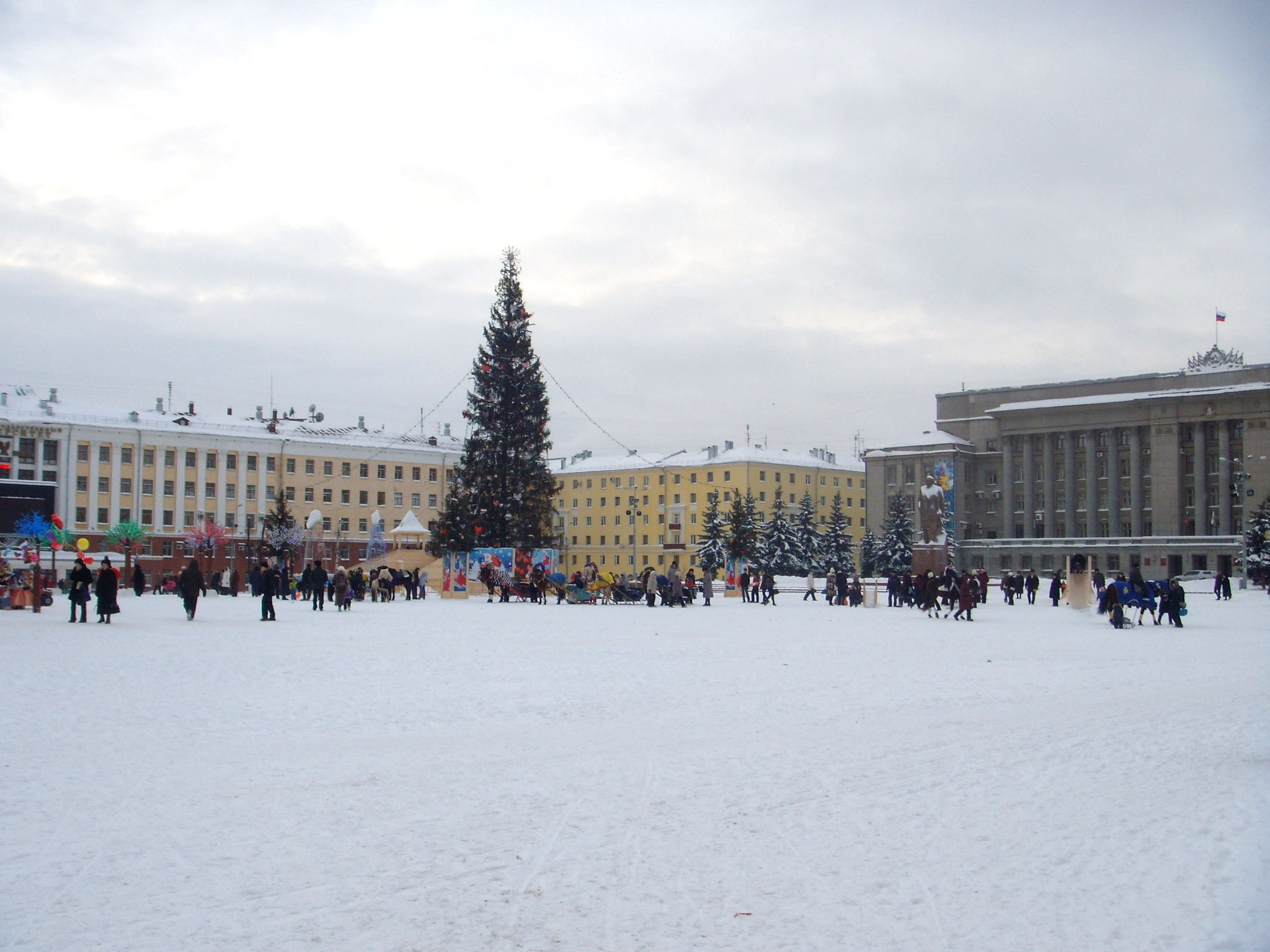
35. Kirov

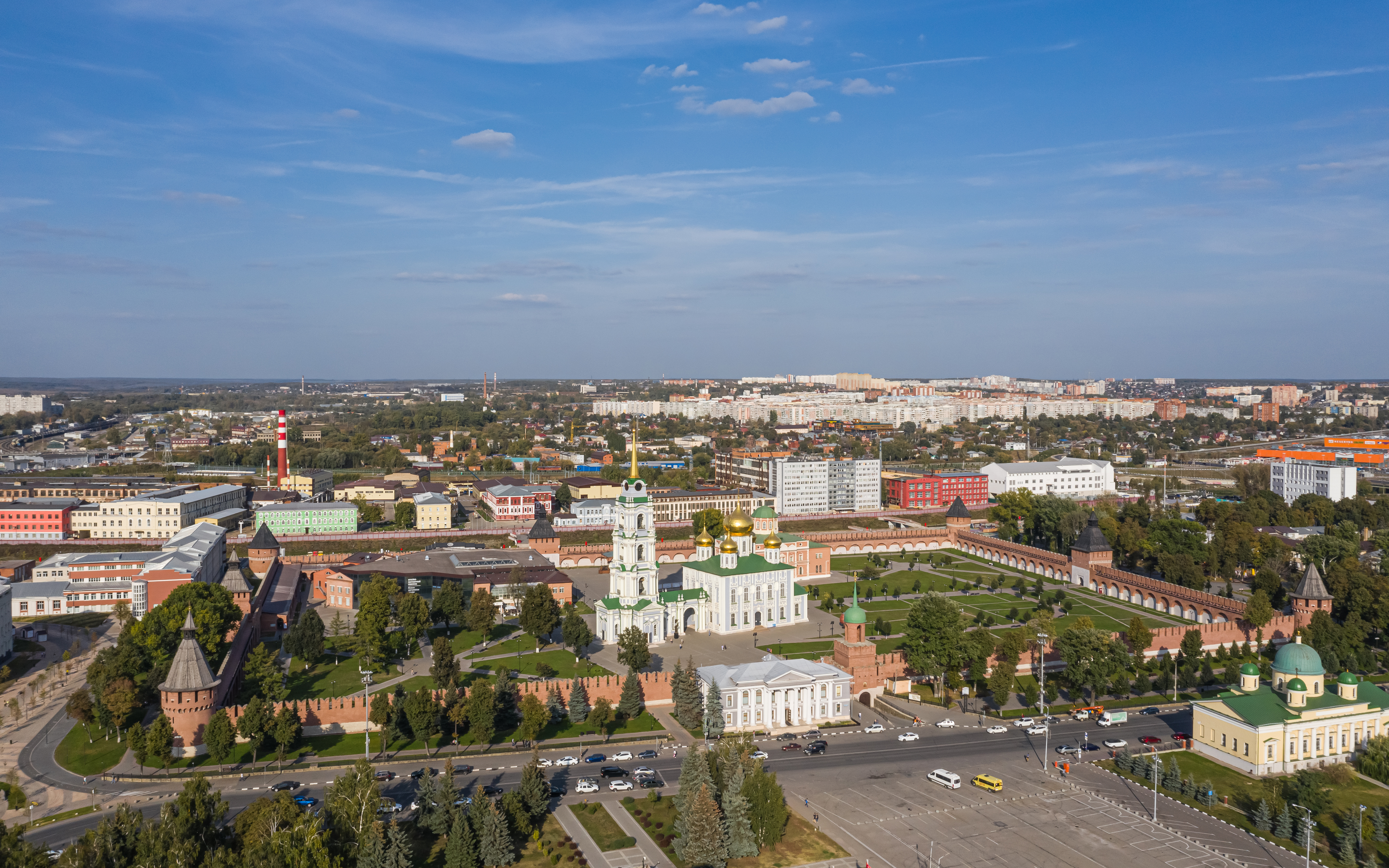
36. Tula

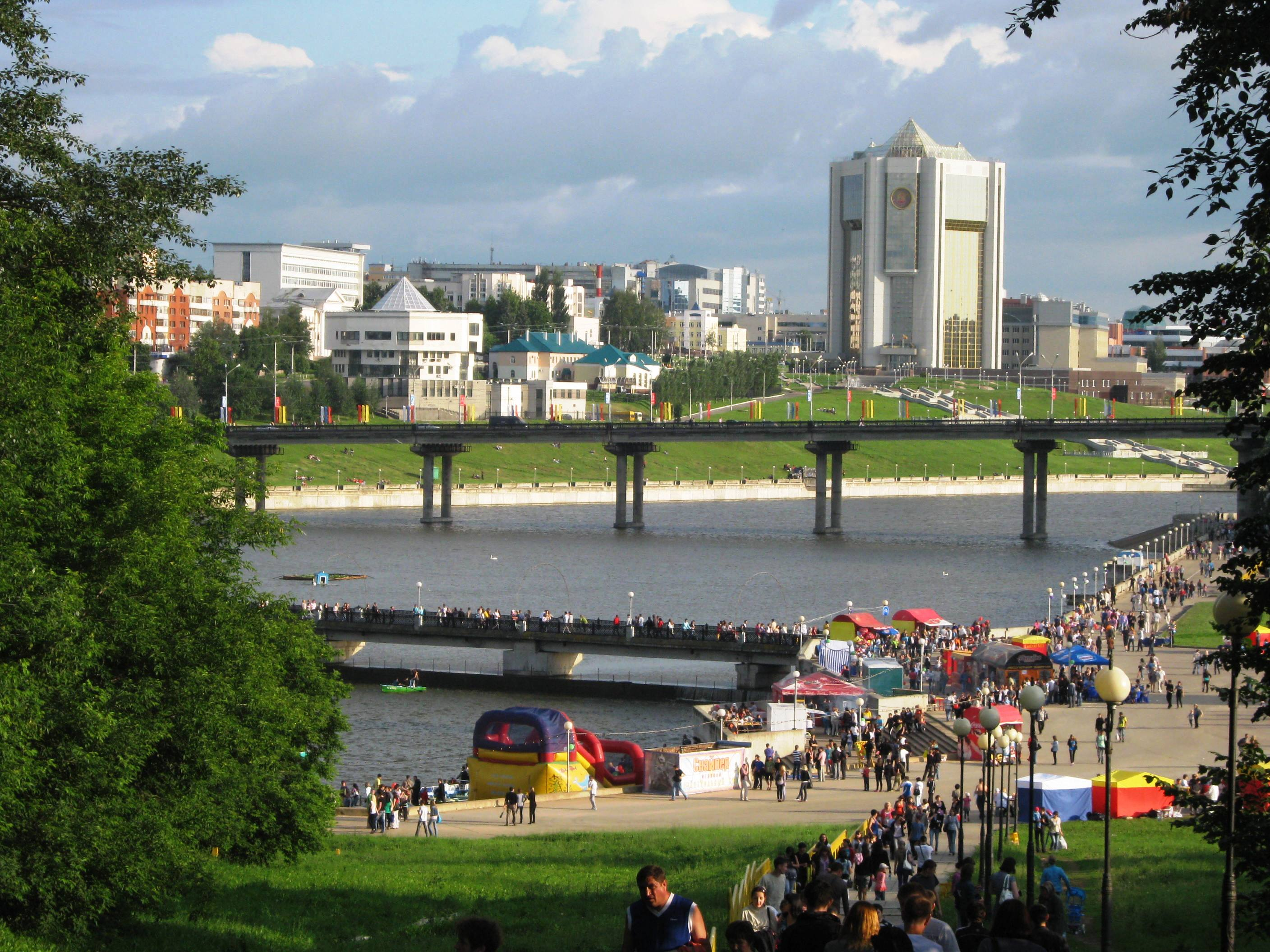
37. Cheboksary

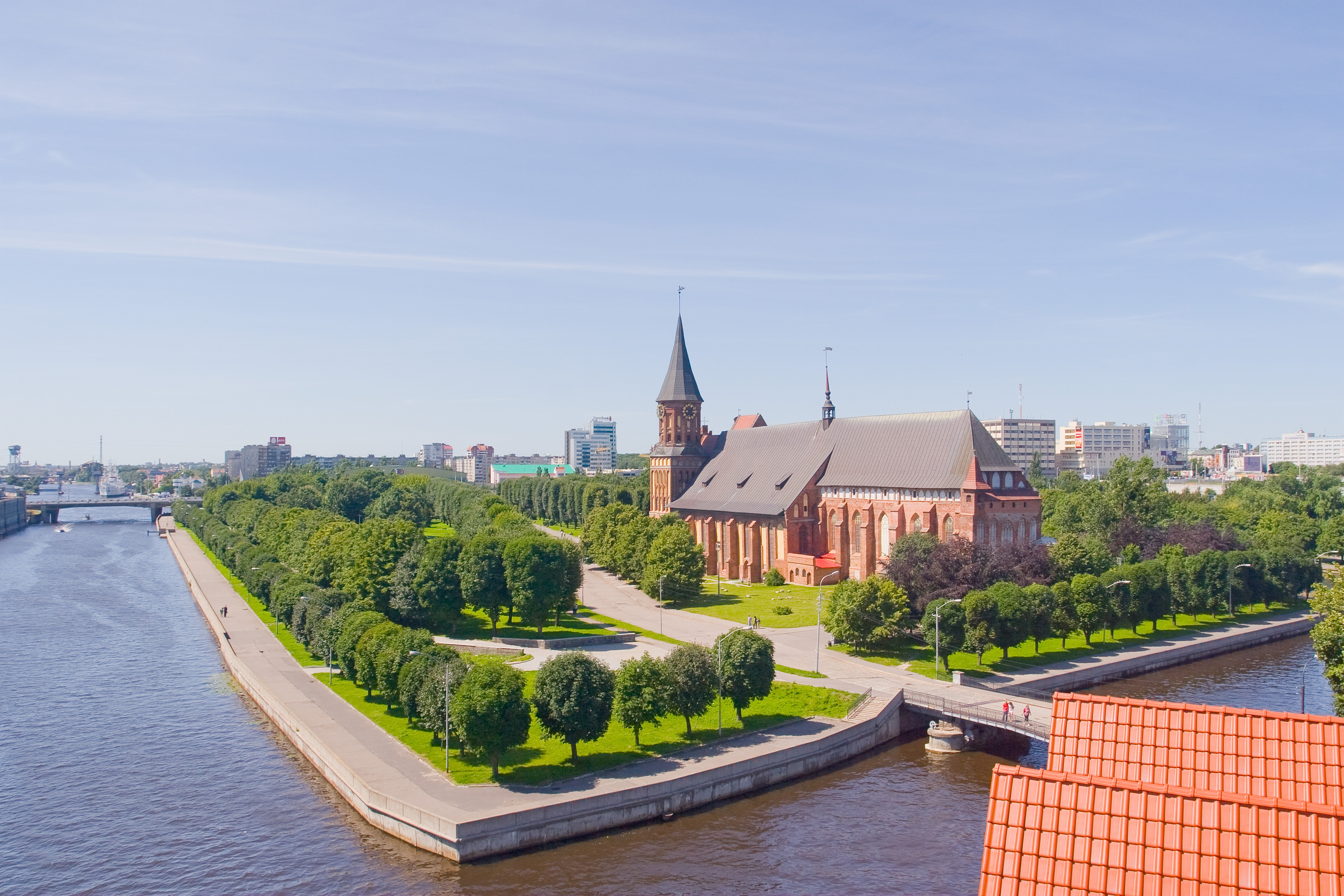
38. Kaliningrad

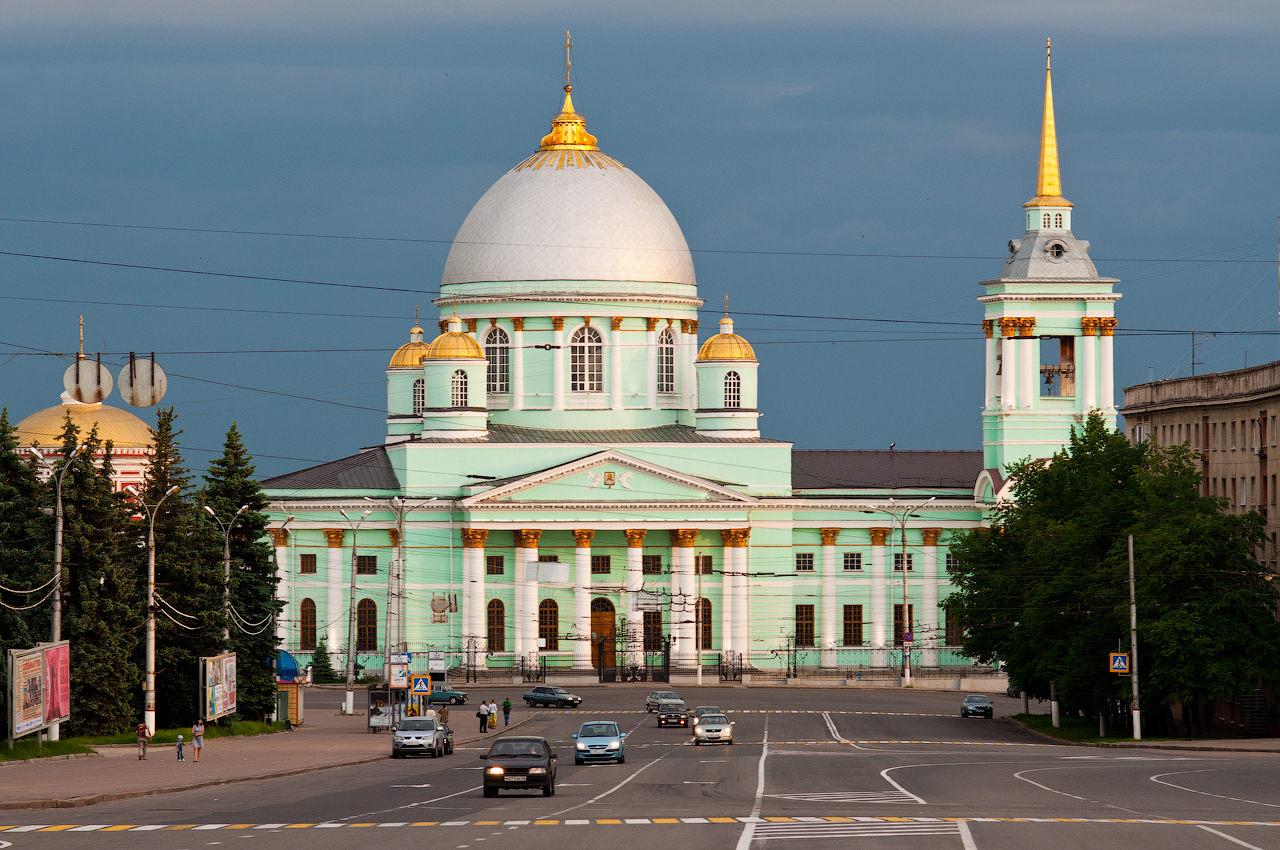
39. Kursk

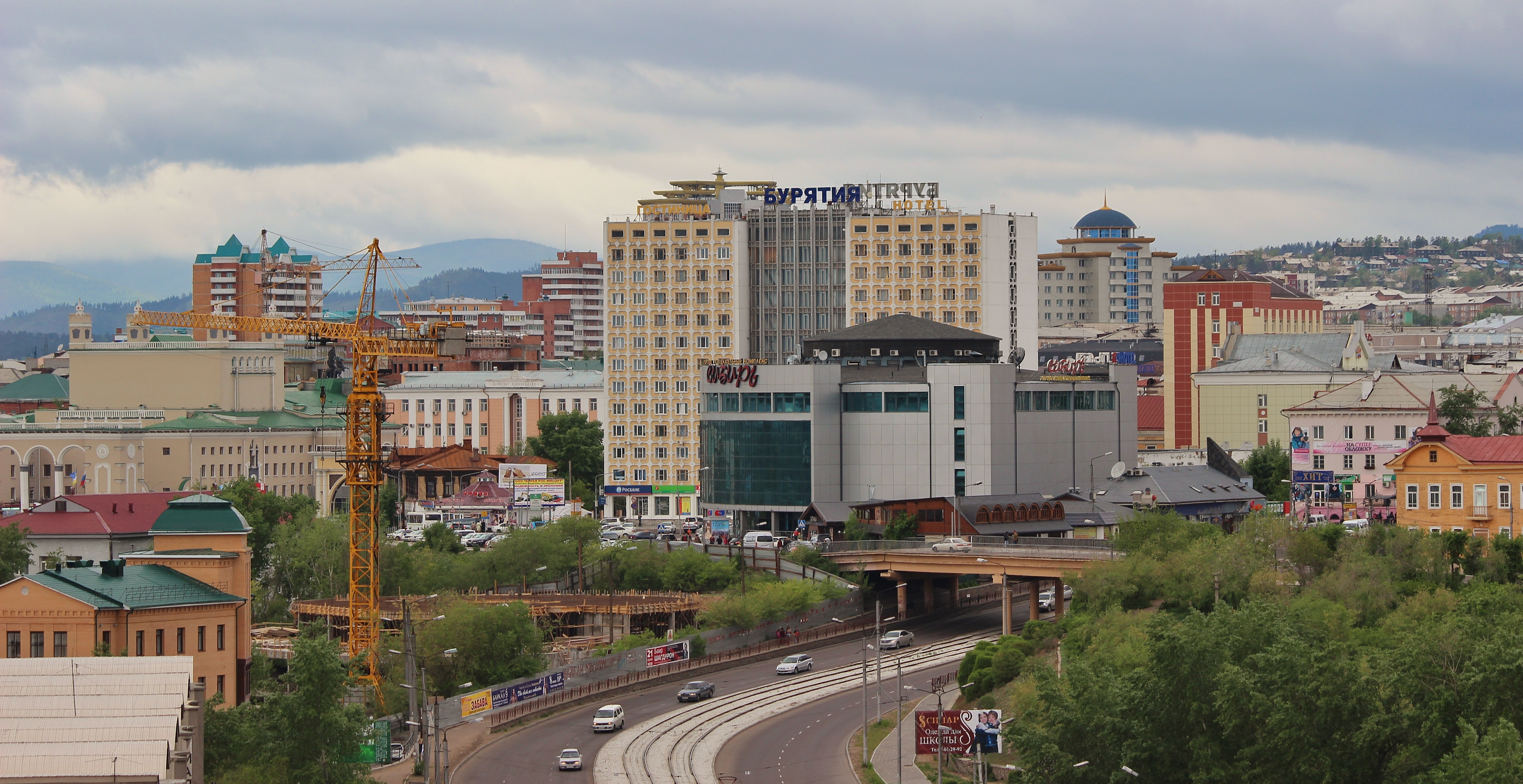
40. Ulan-Ude

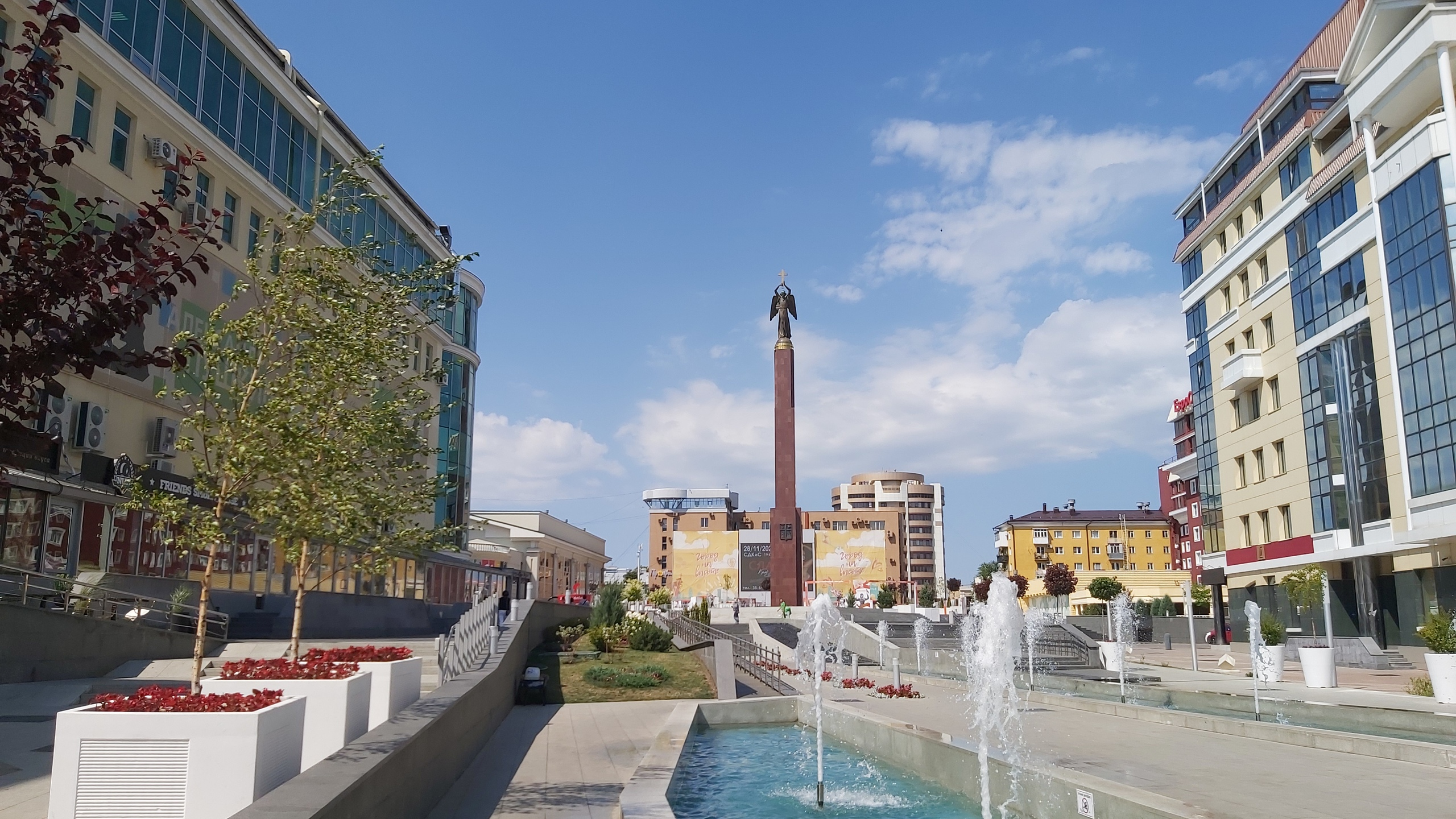
41. Stavropol

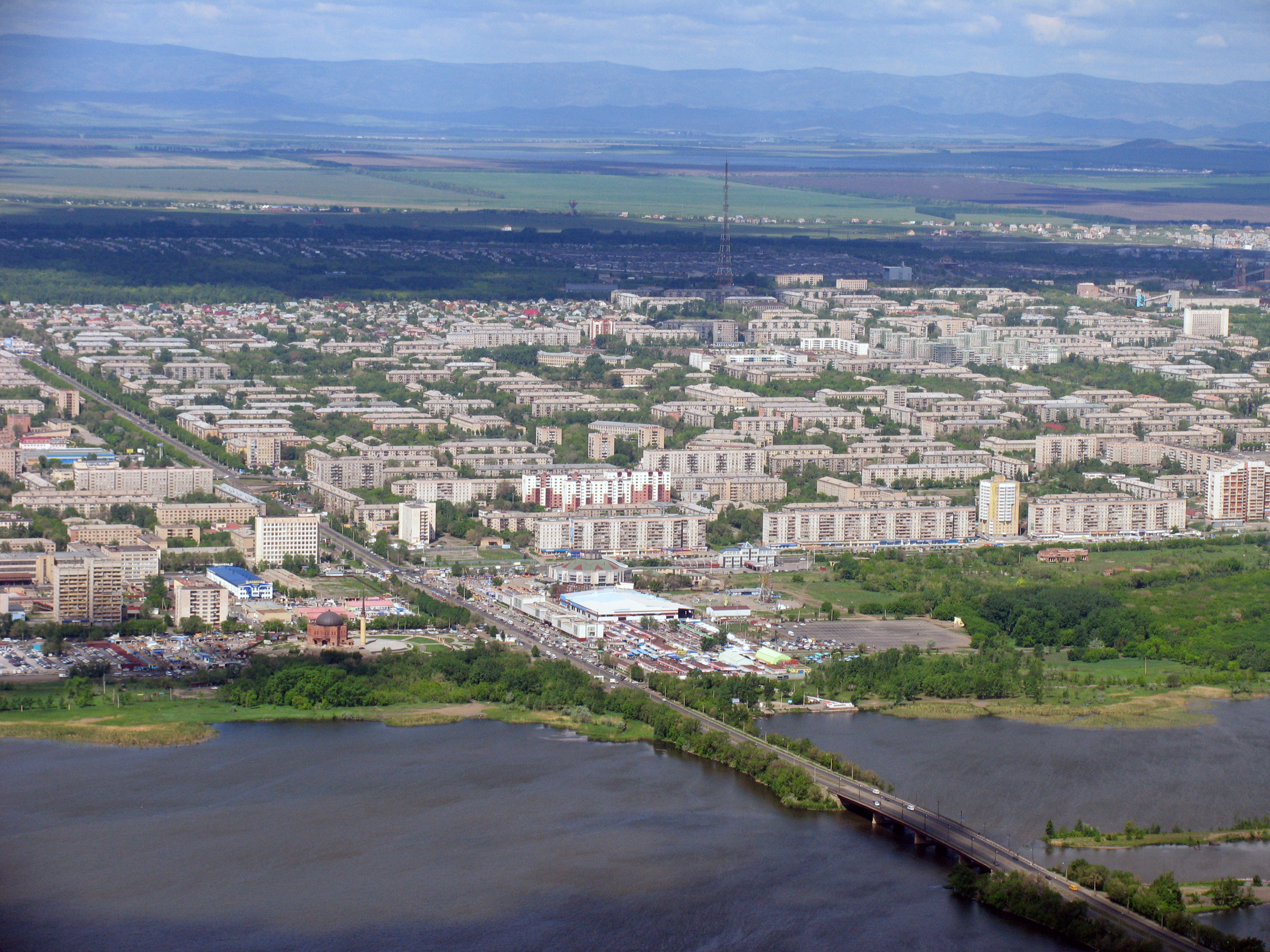
42. Magnitogorsk

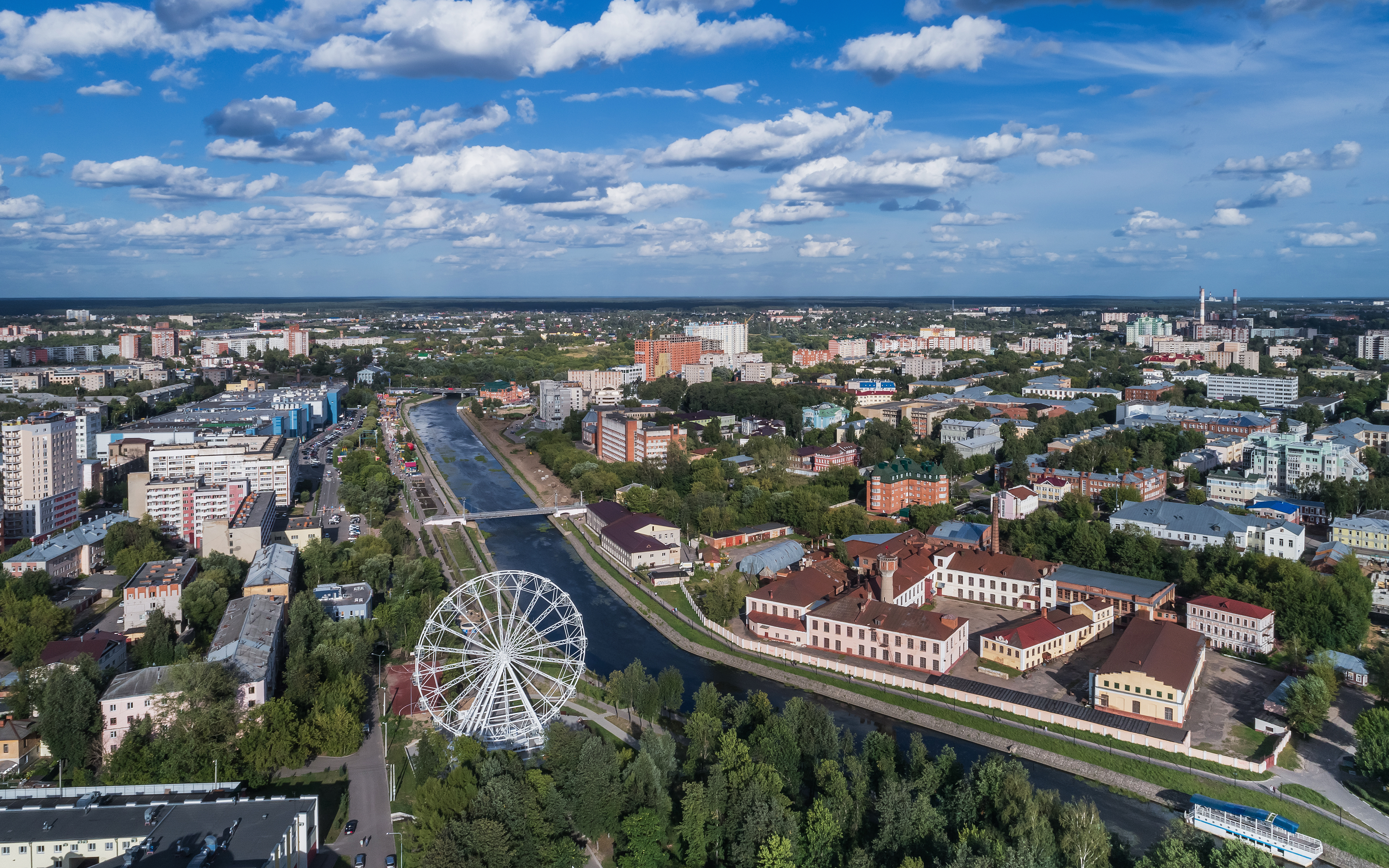
43. Ivanovo

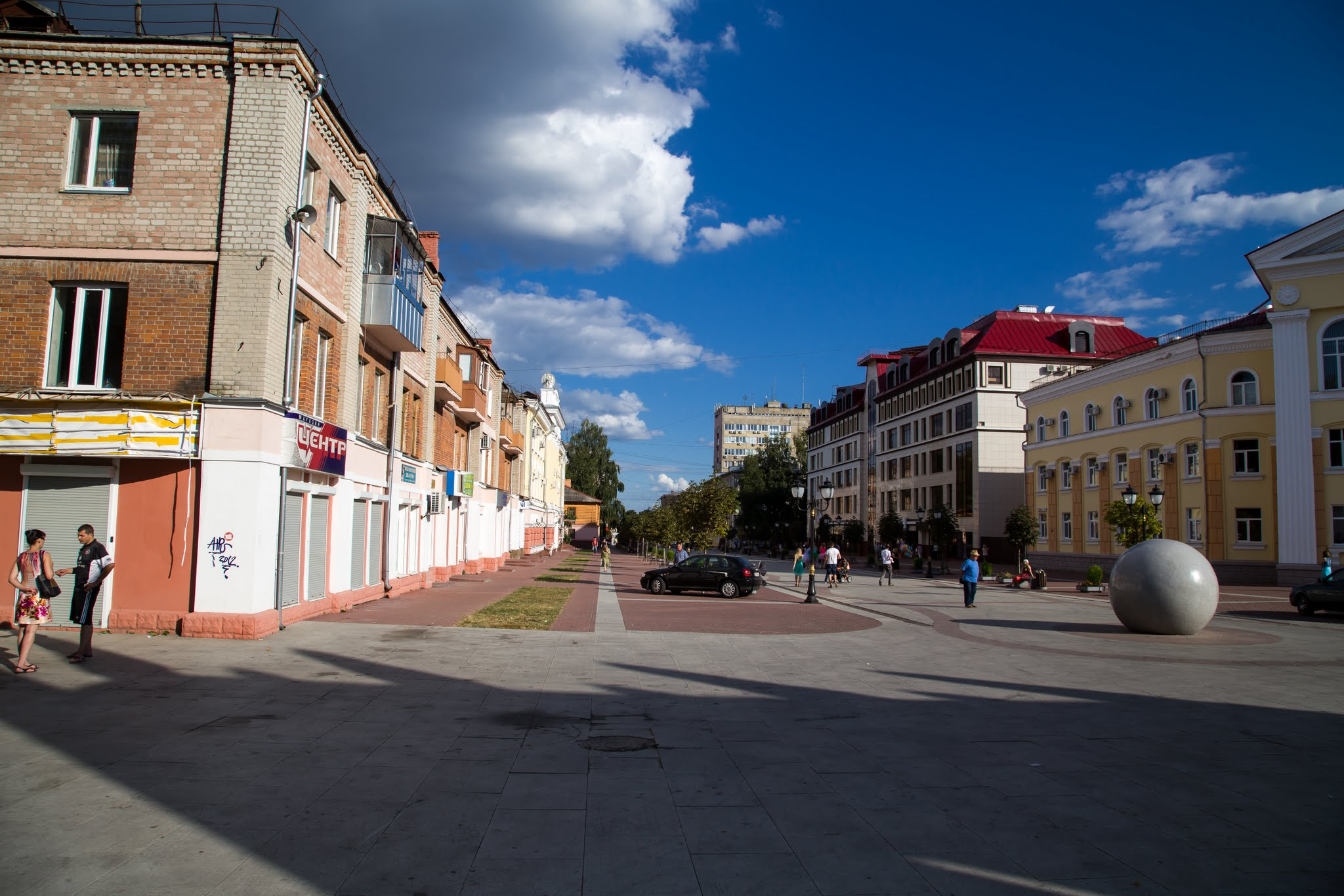
44. Bryansk

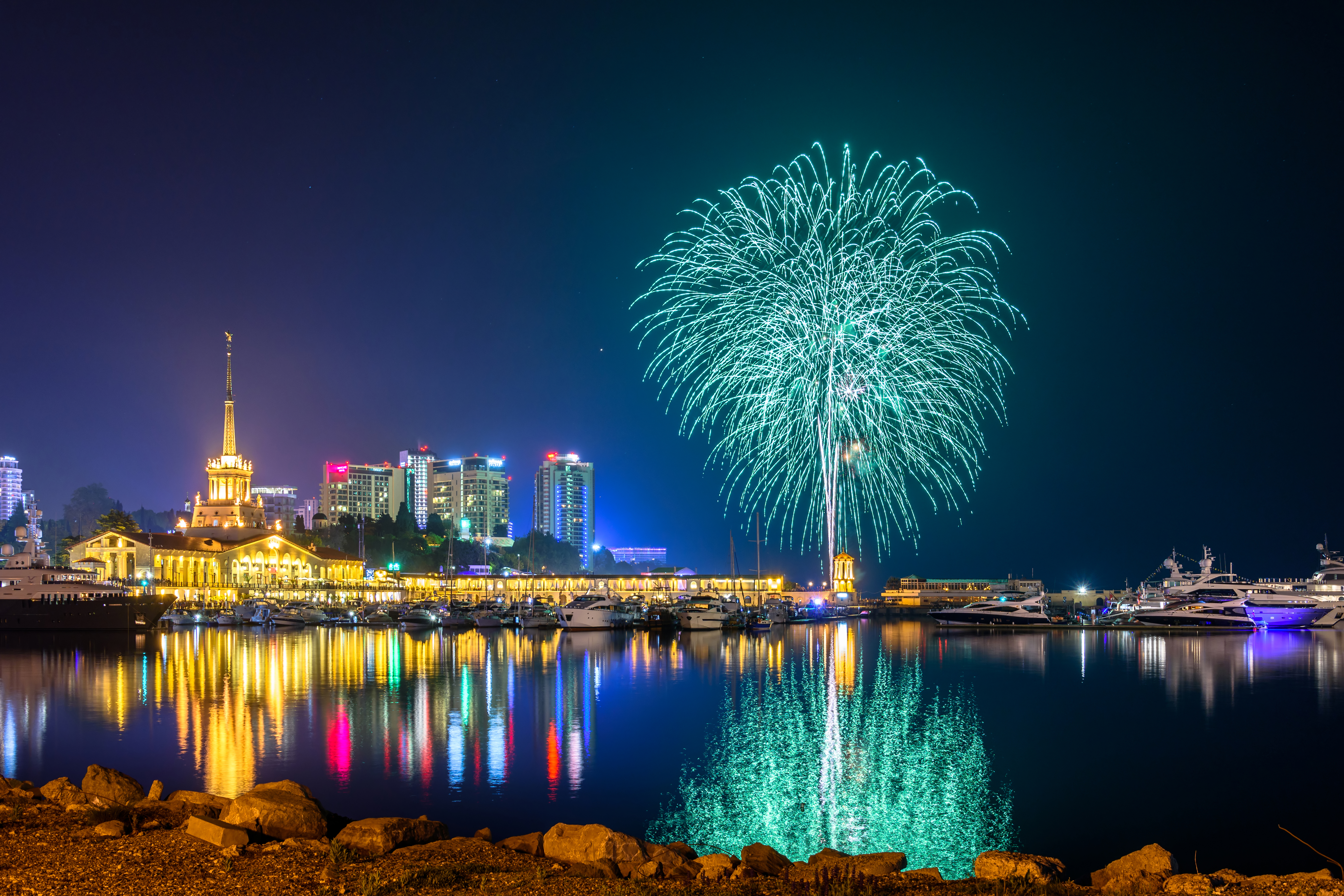
46. Sochi

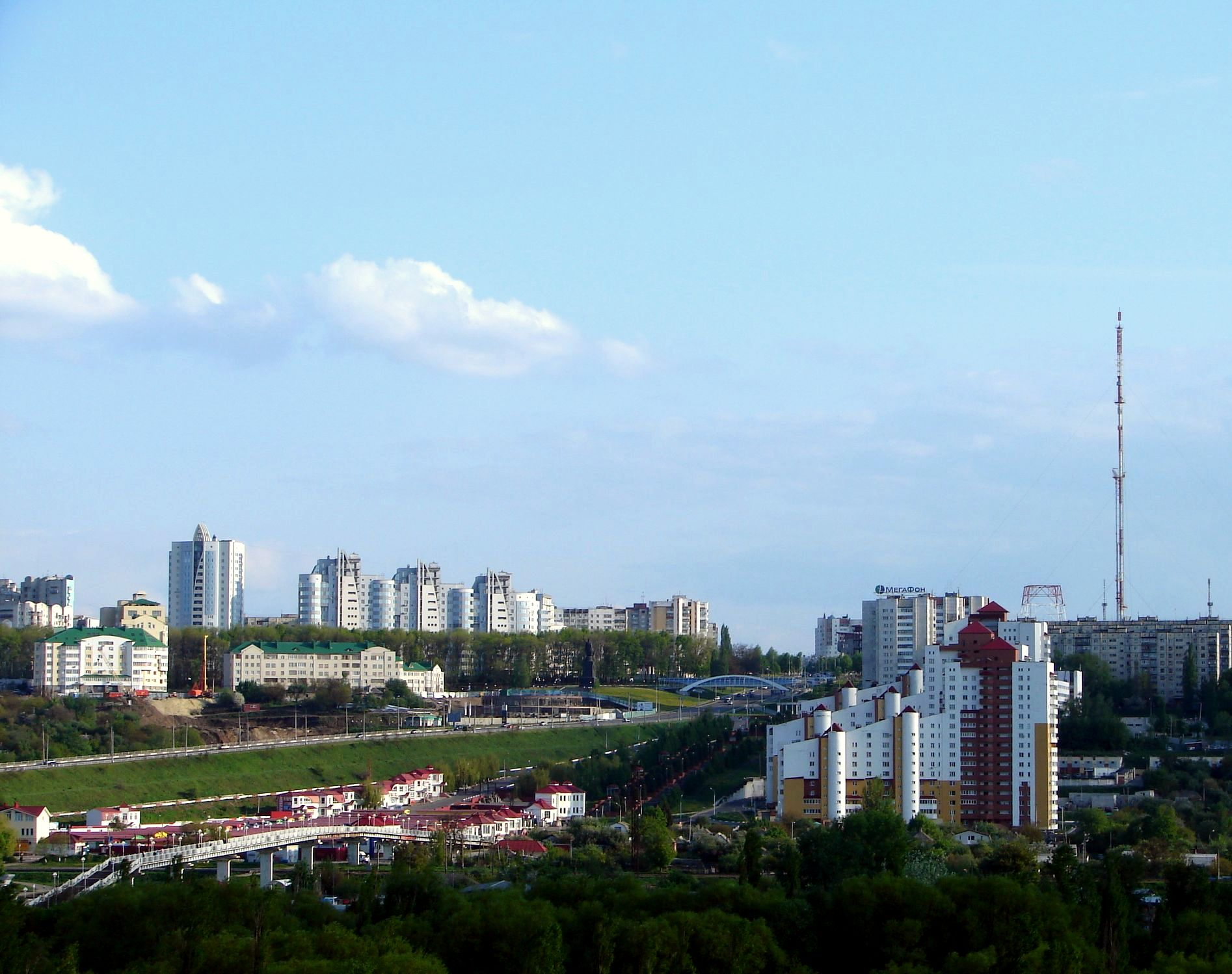
47. Belgorod

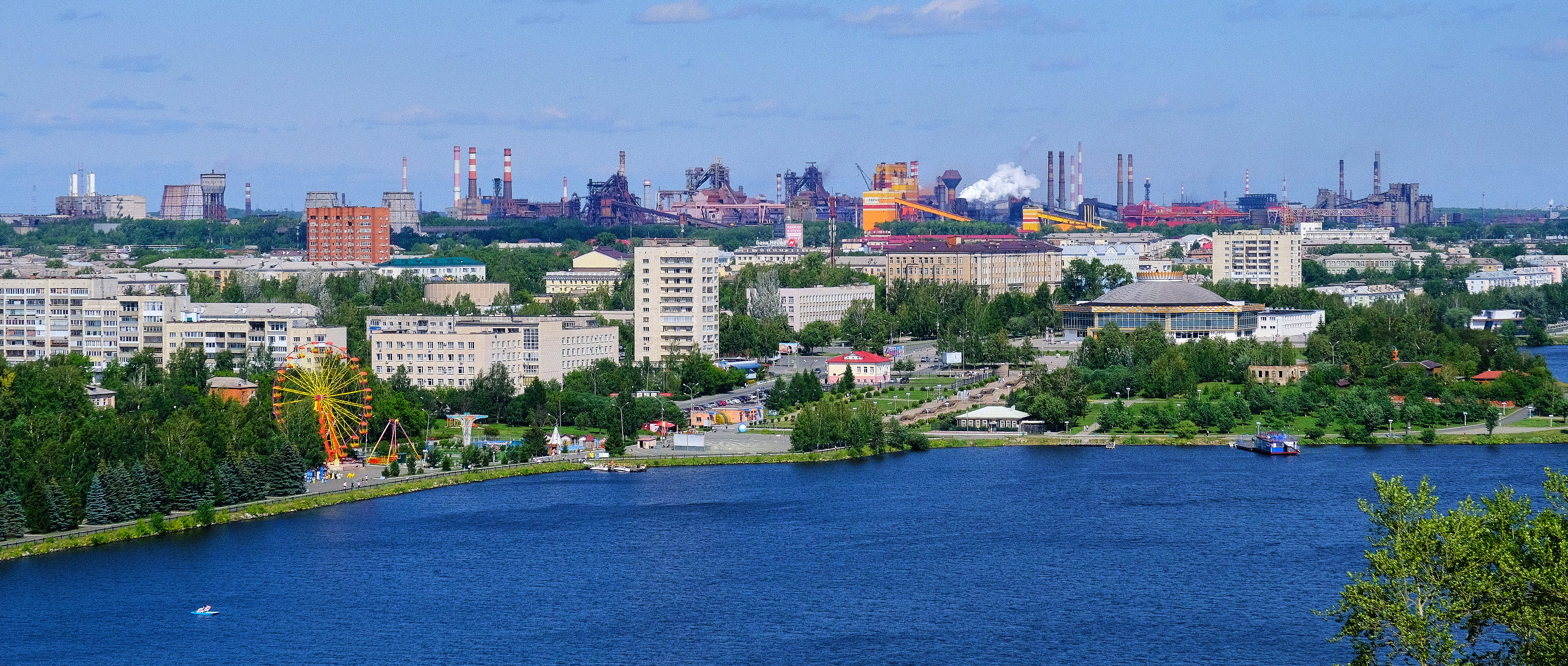
48. Nizhny Tagil

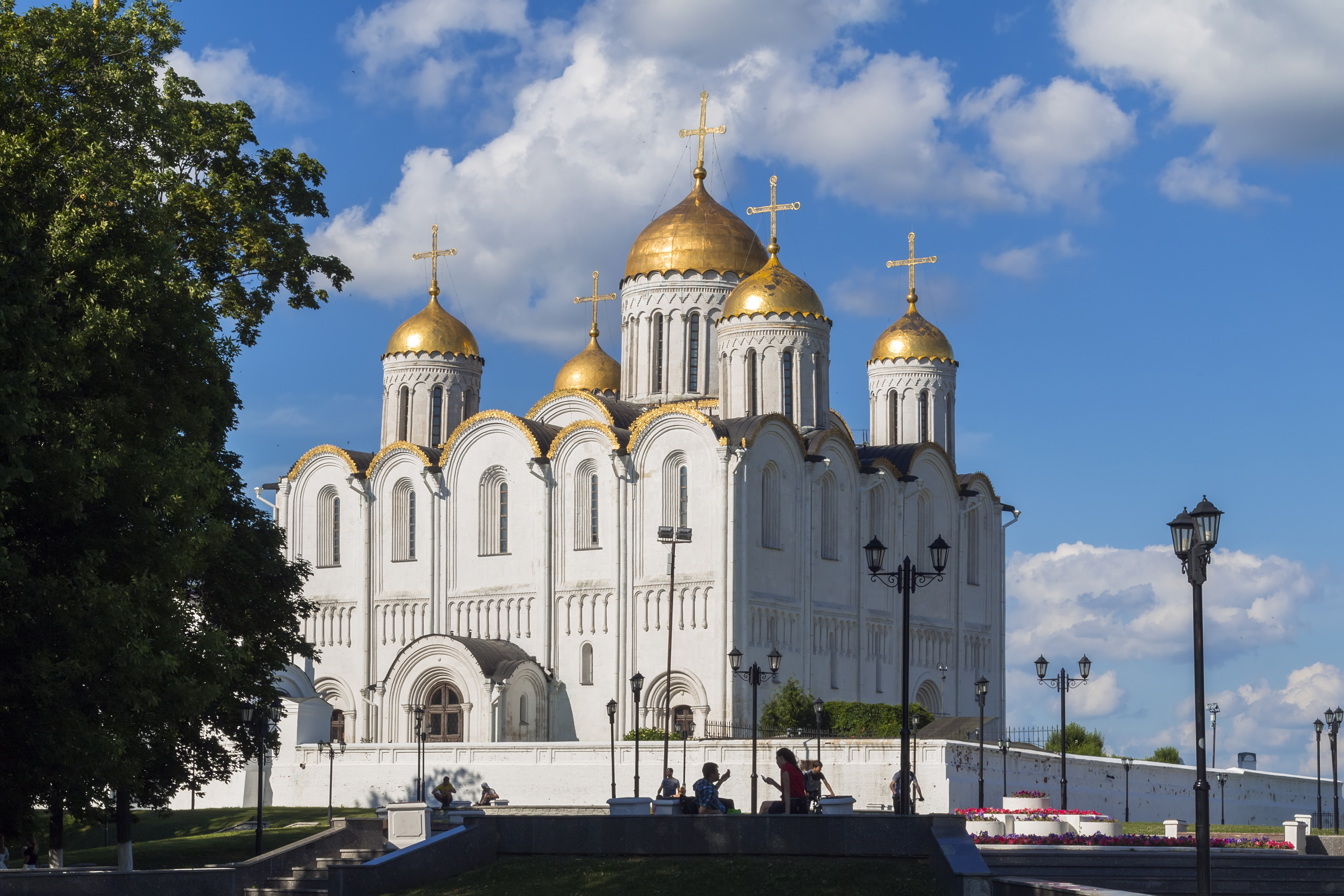
49. Vladimir

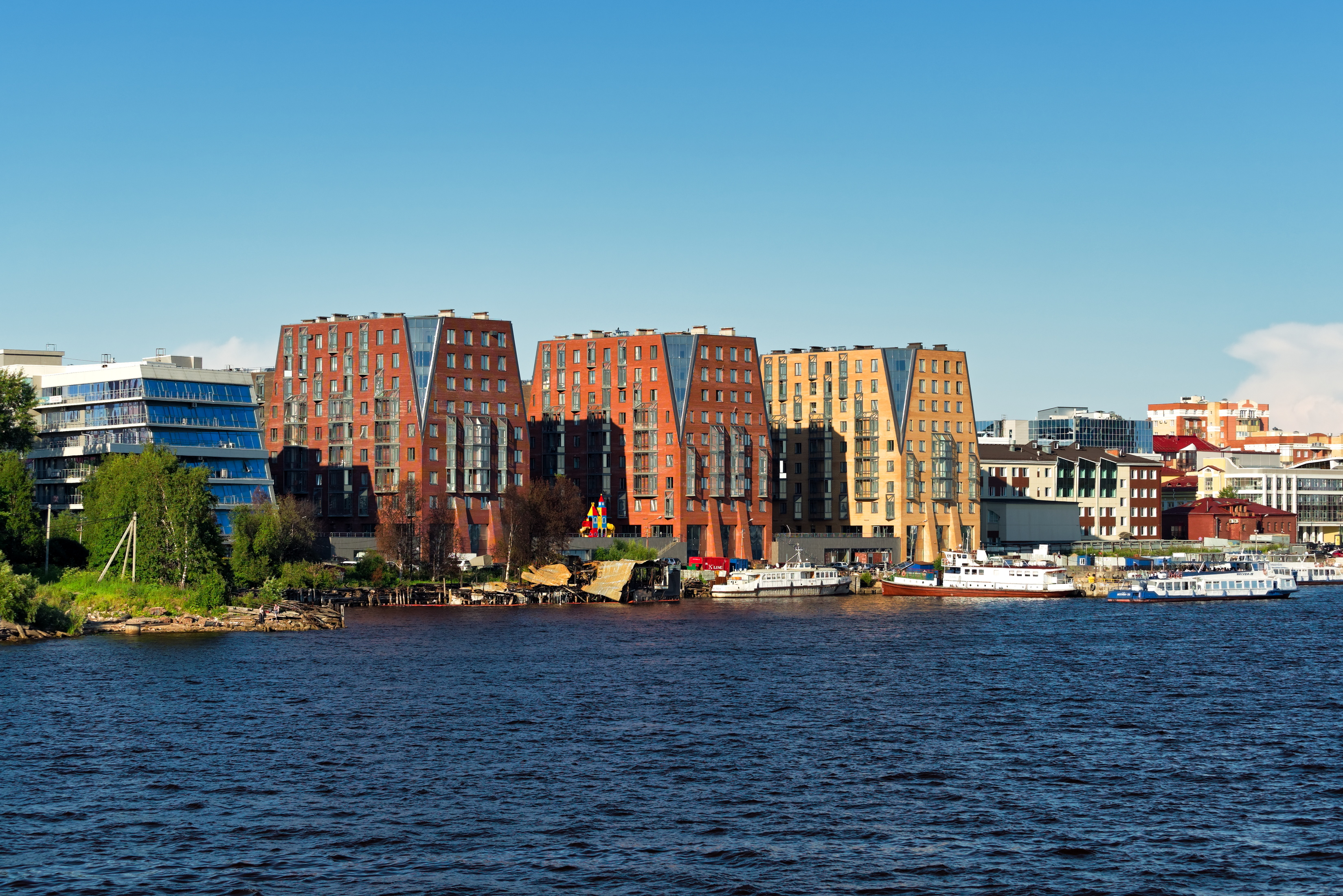
50. Arkhangelsk

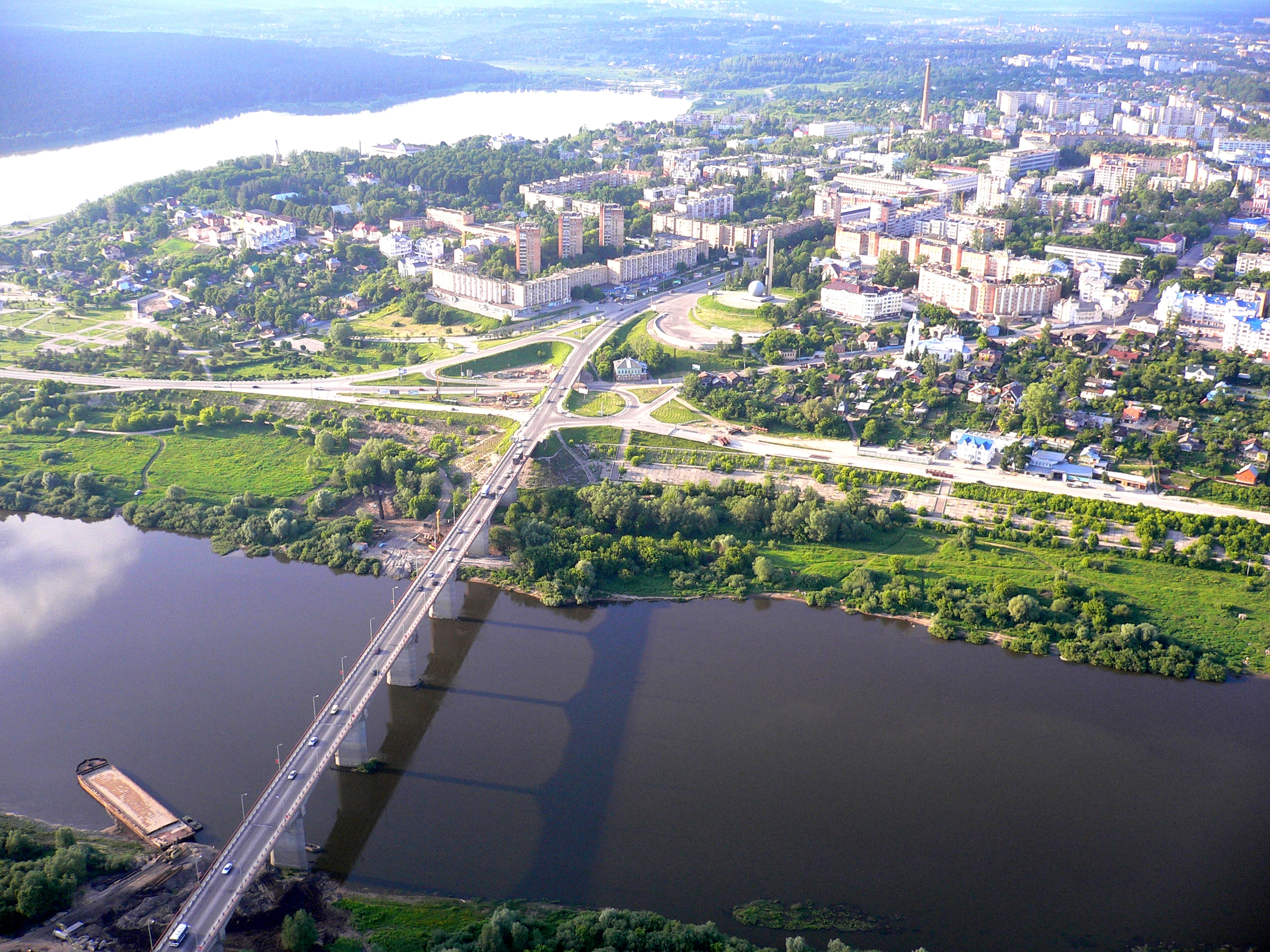
51. Kaluga

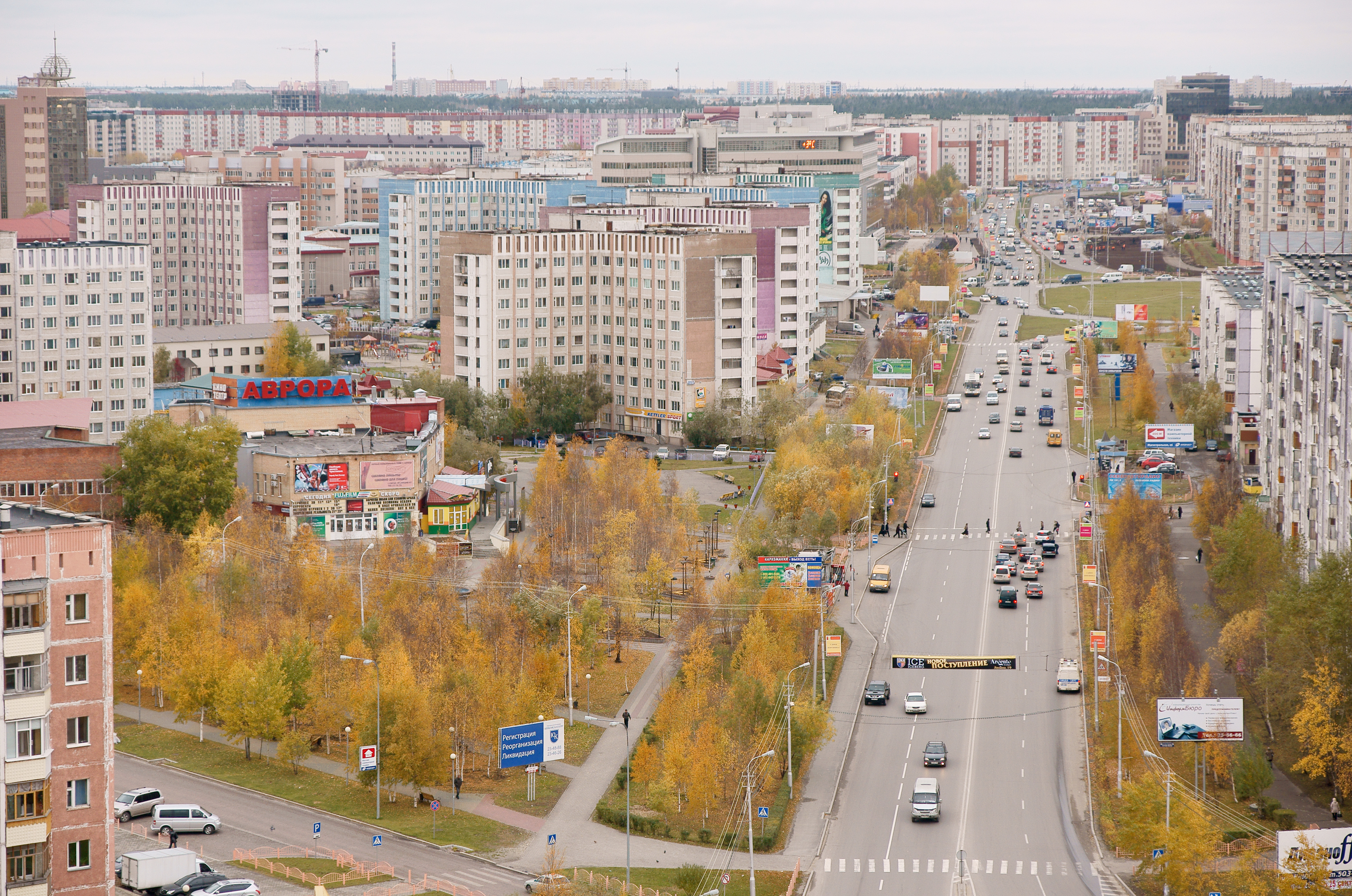
52. Surgut

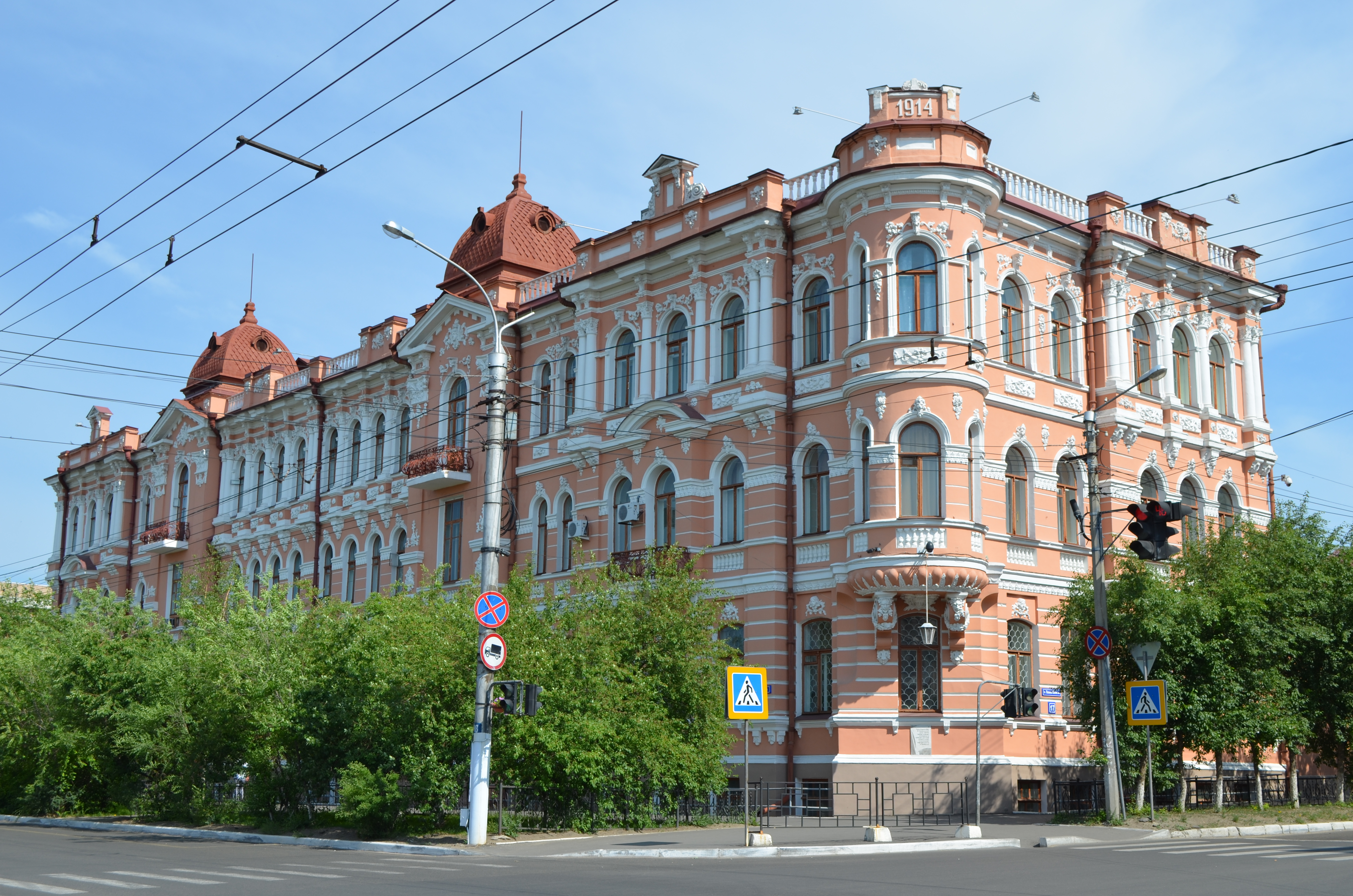
53. Chita

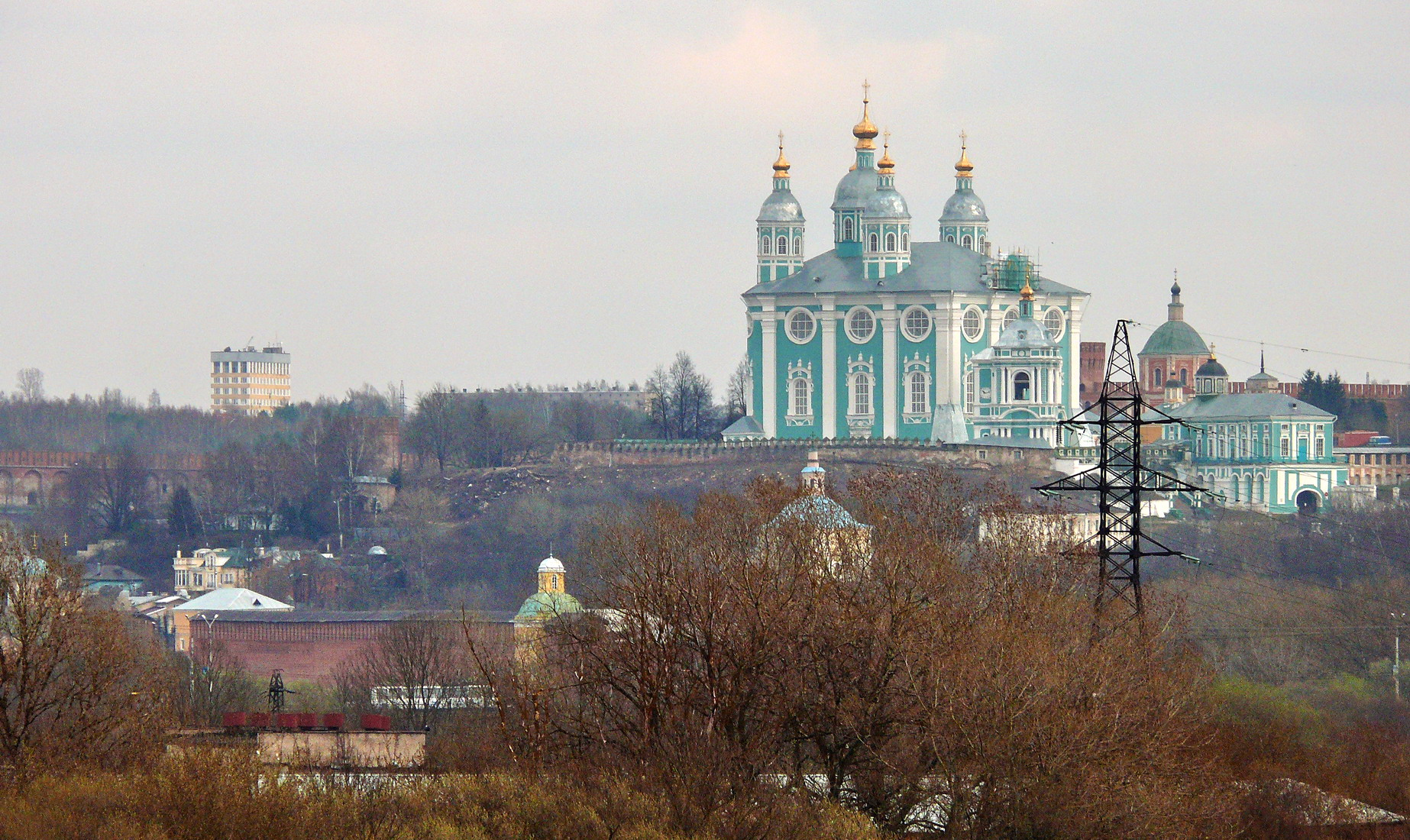
55. Smolensk

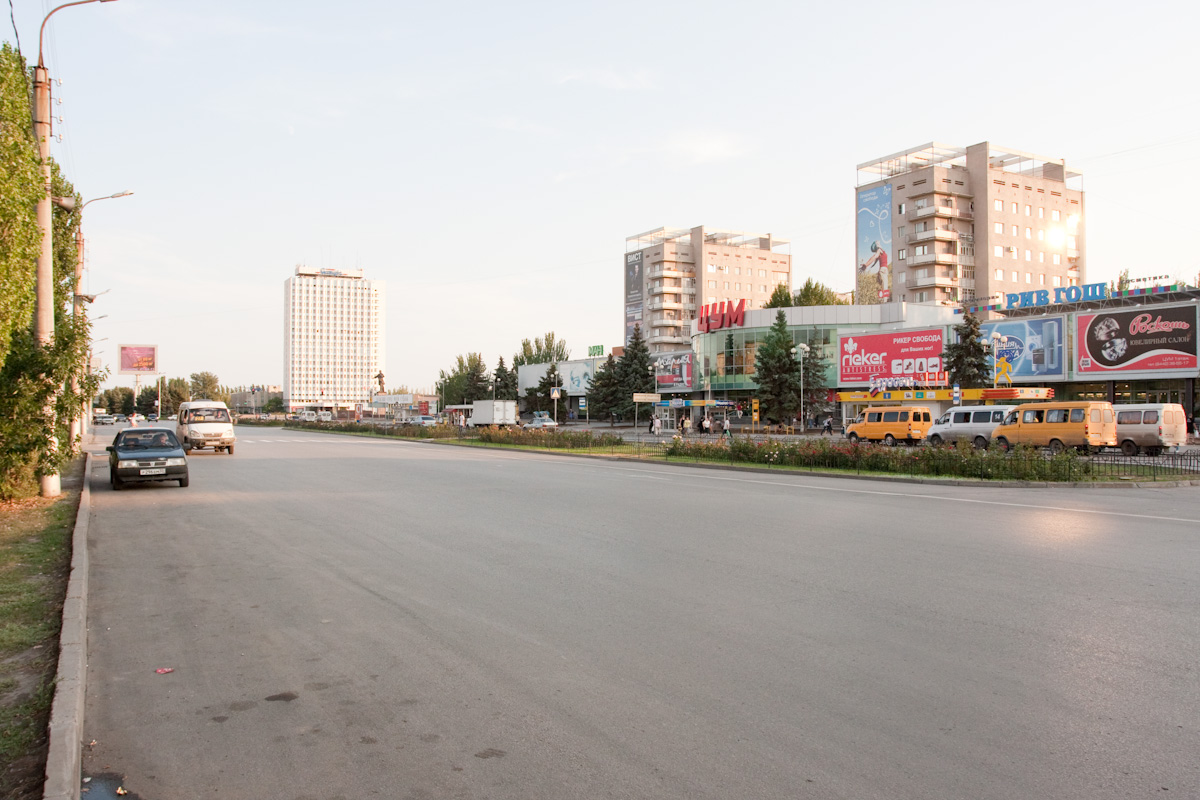
56. Volzhsky

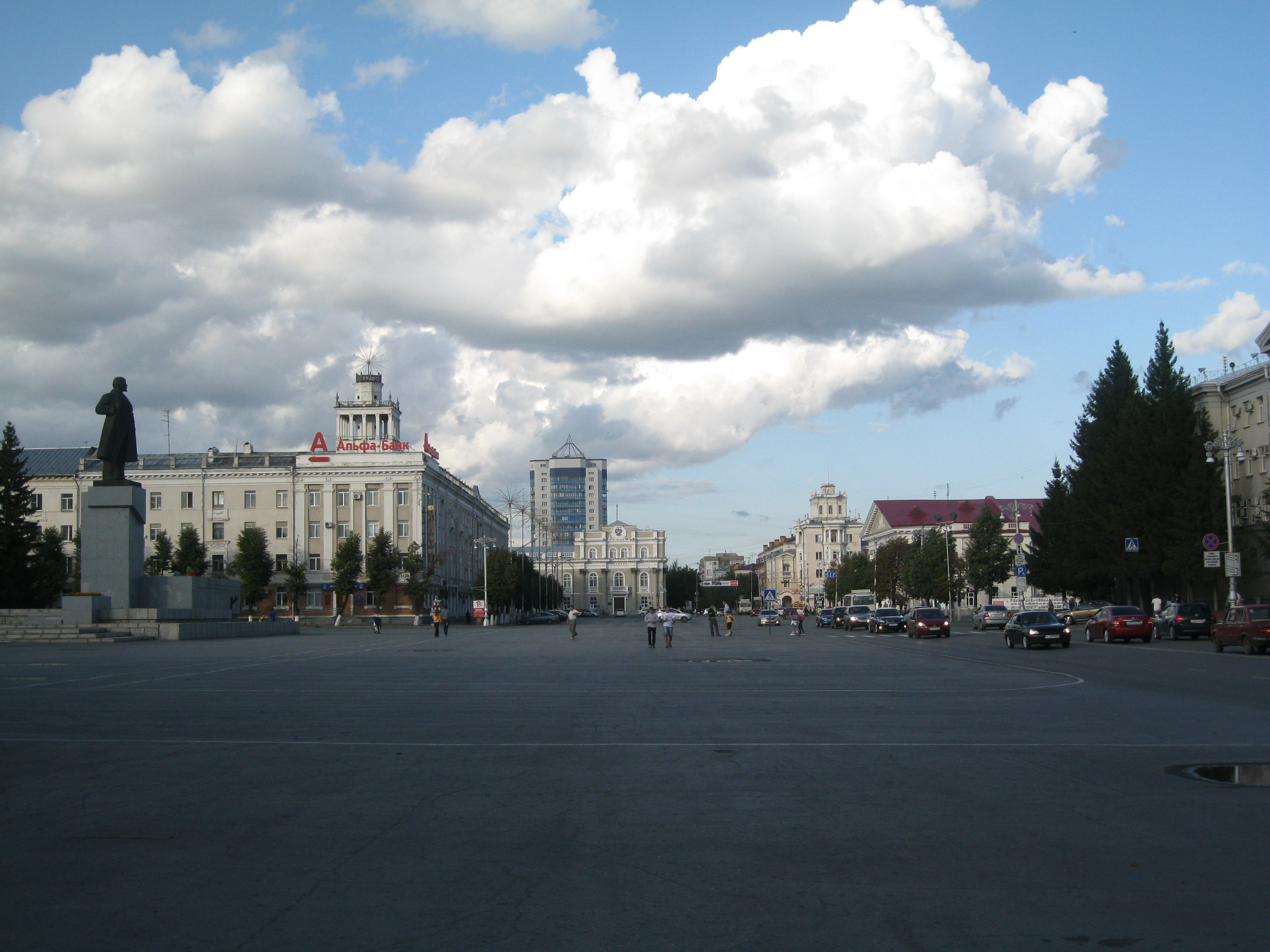
57. Kurgan

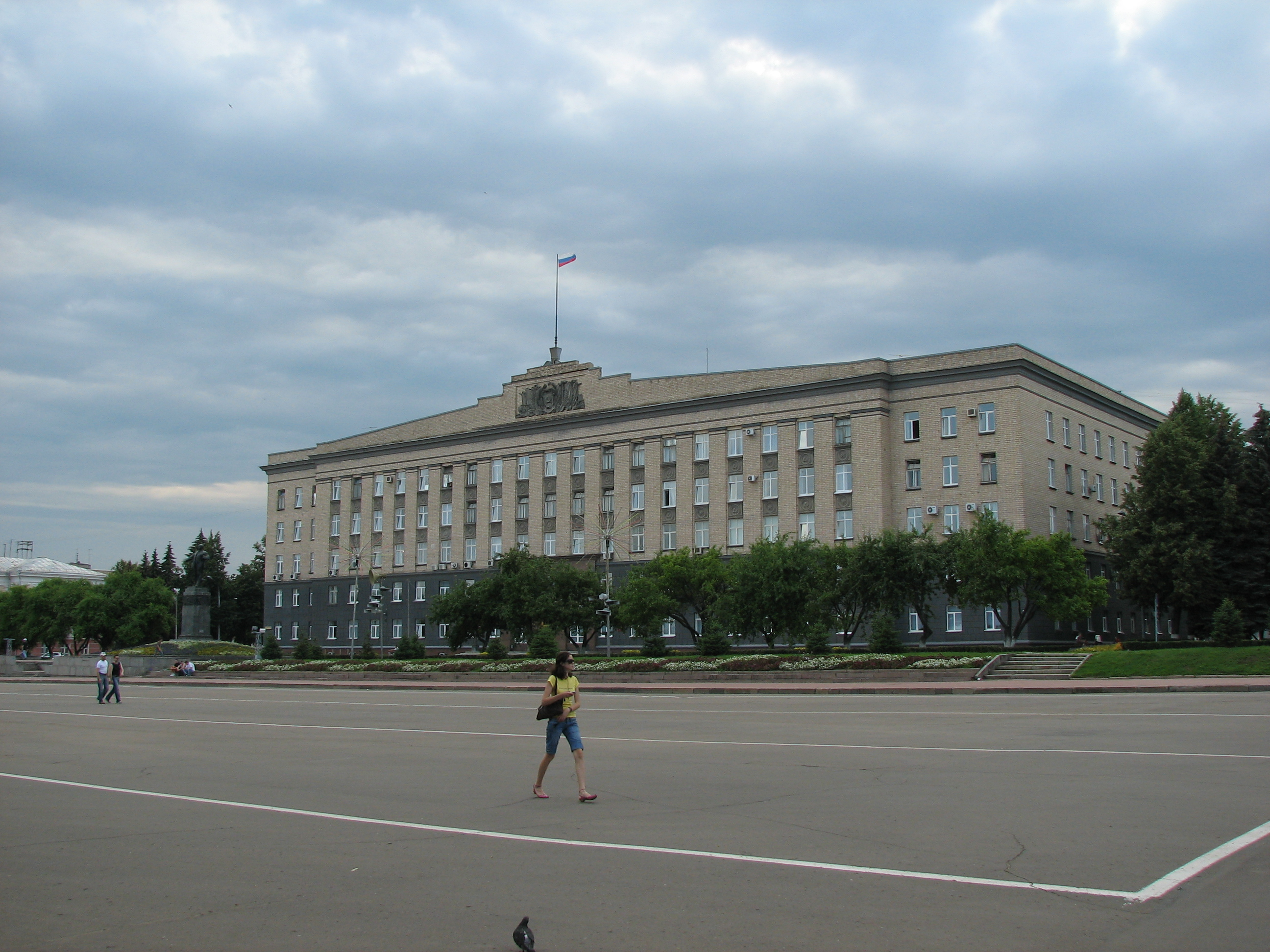
58. Oryol

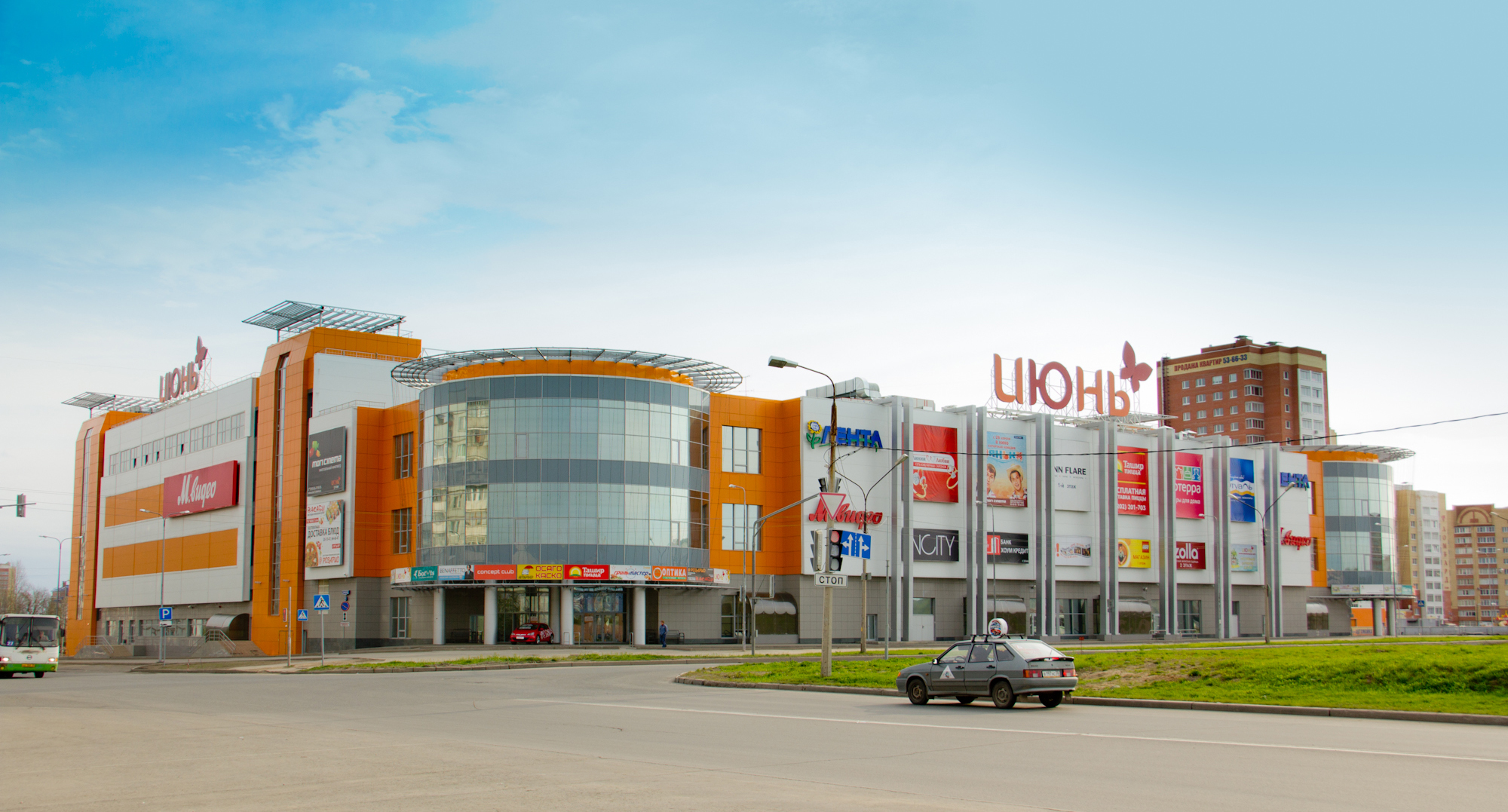
59. Cherepovets

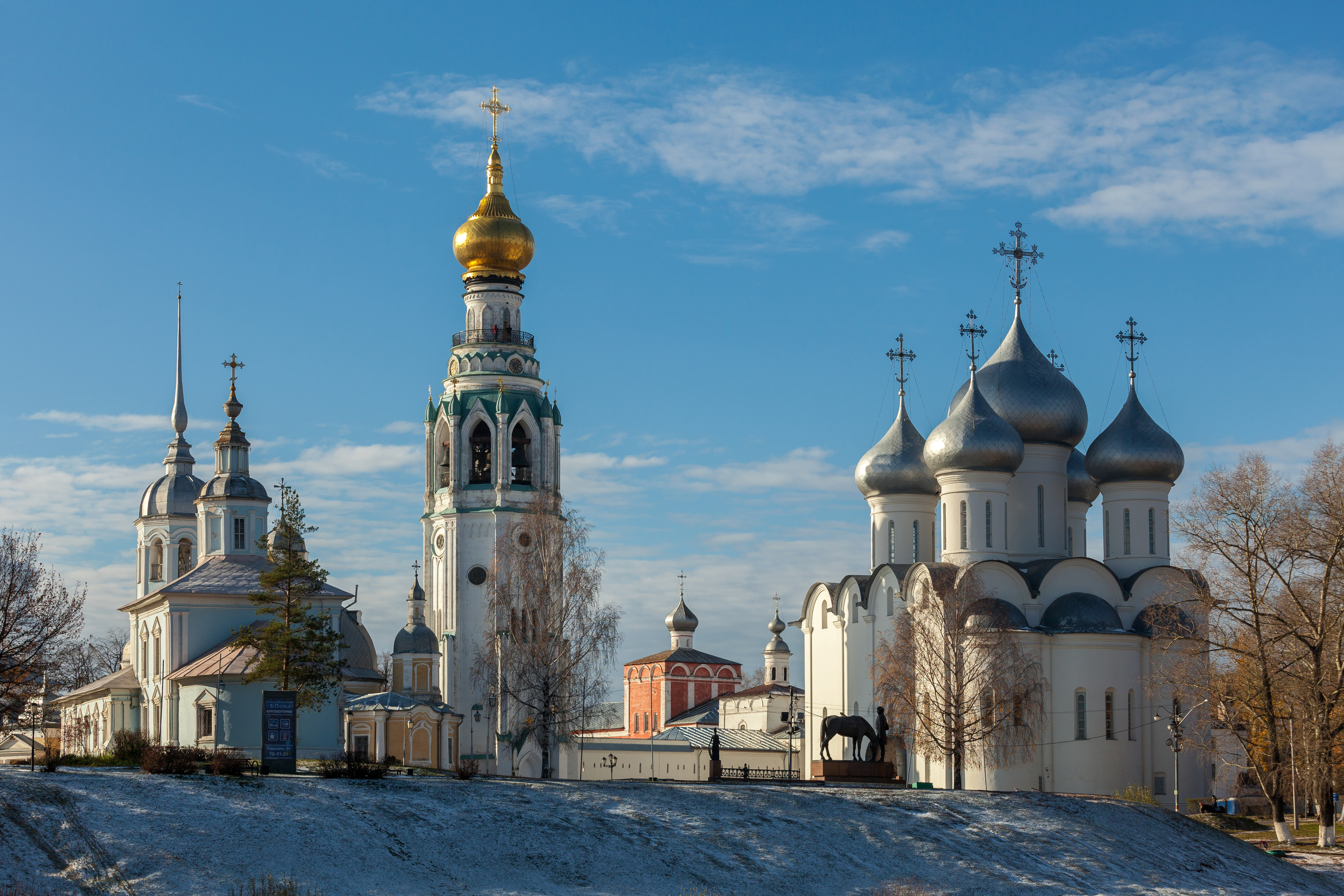
60. Vologda

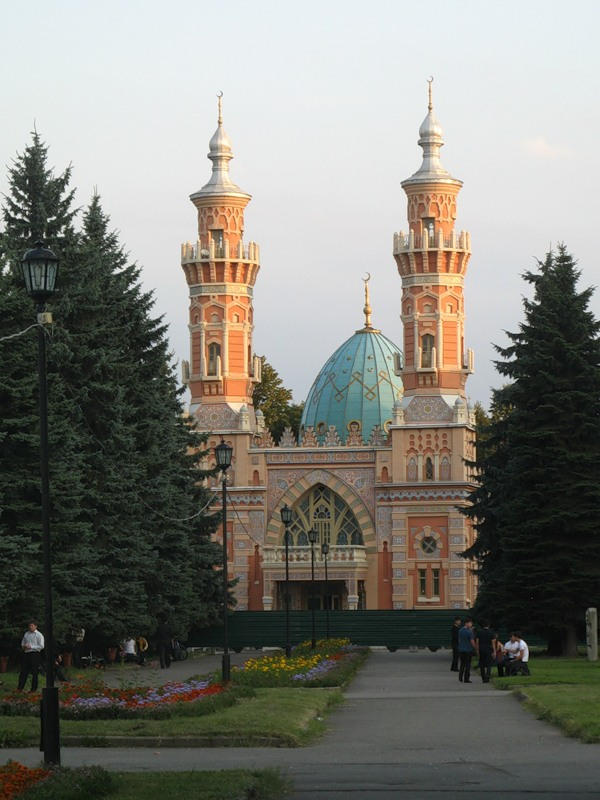
61. Vladikavkaz

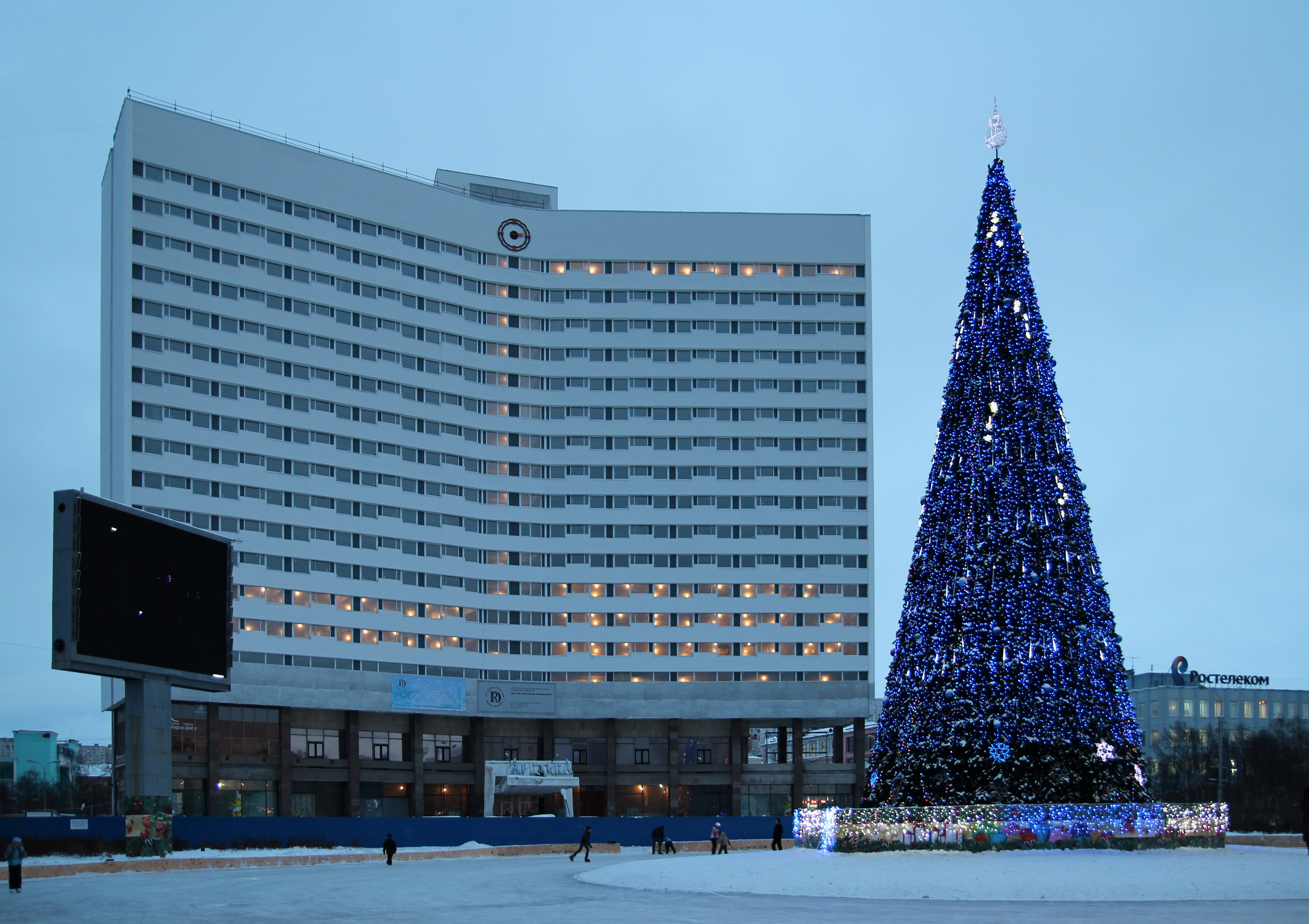
62. Murmansk

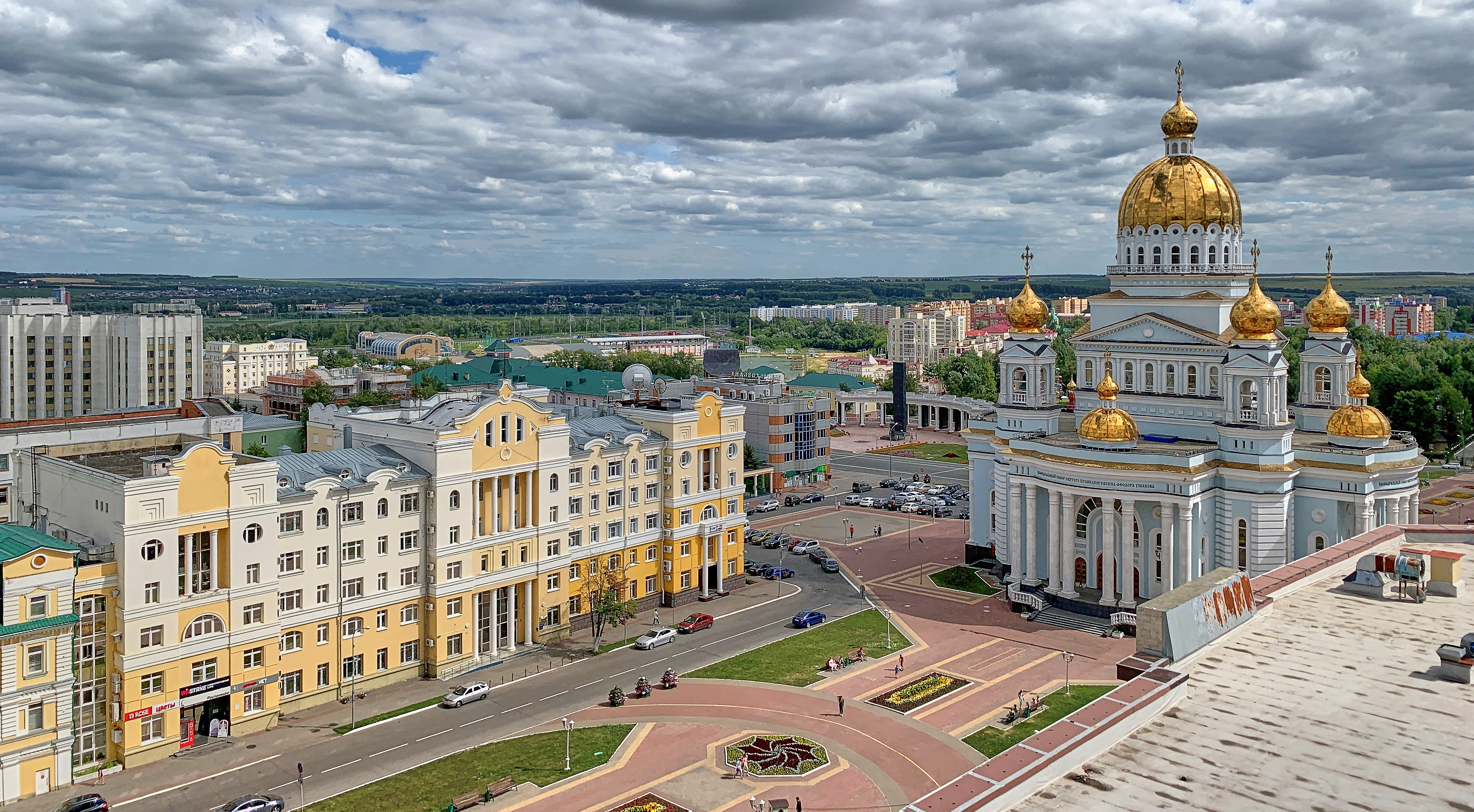
63. Saransk

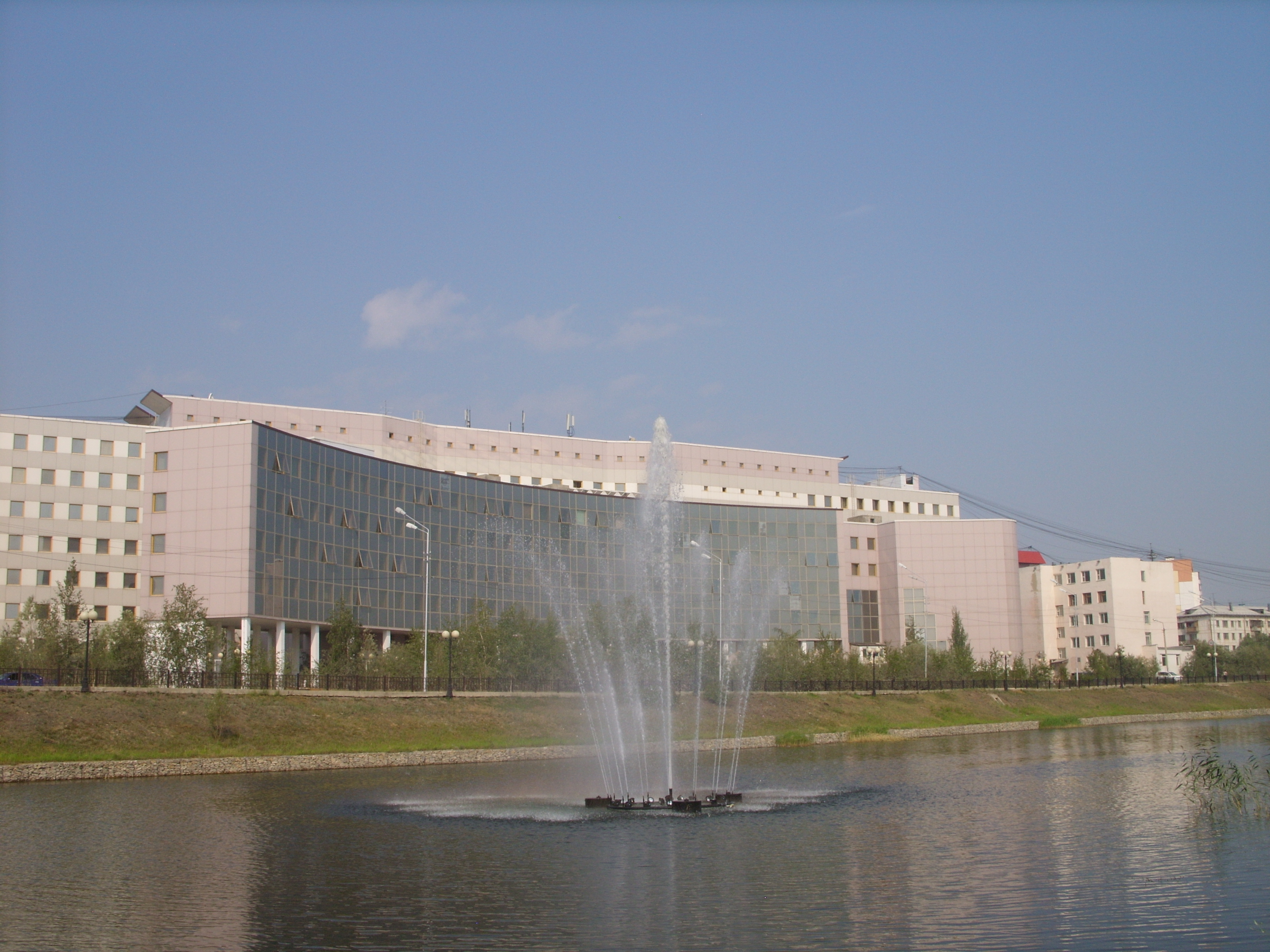
64. Yakutsk

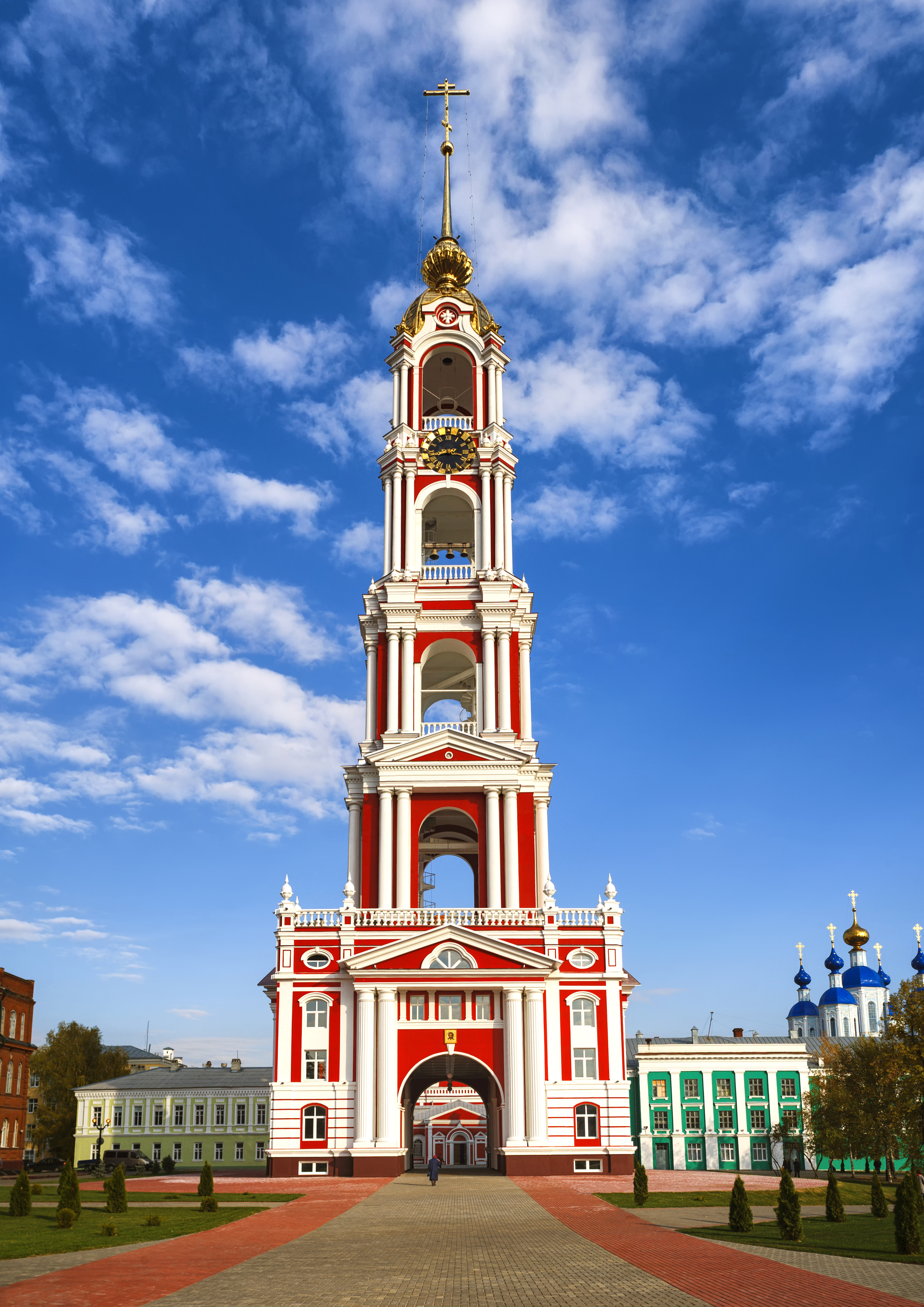
65. Tambov

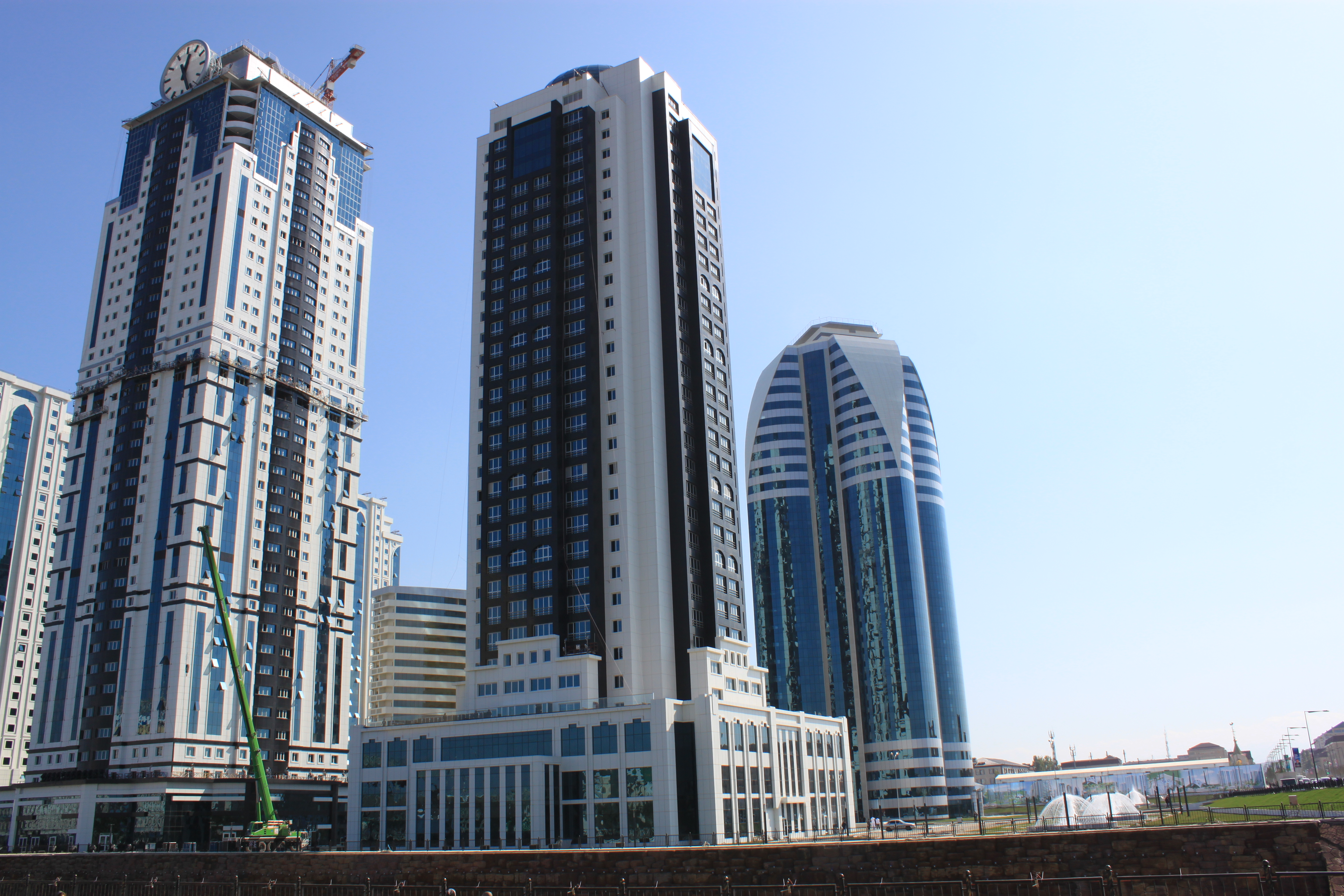
66. Grozny

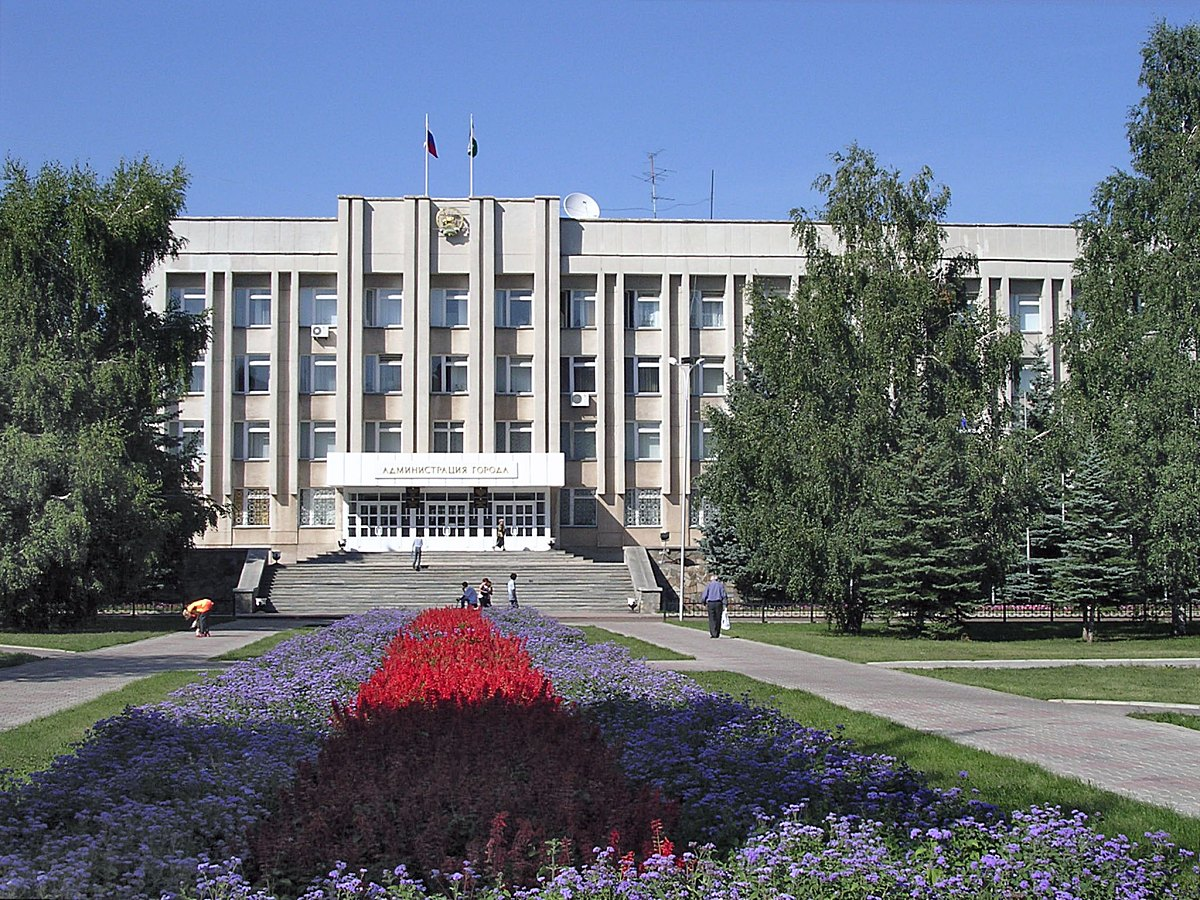
67. Sterlitamak

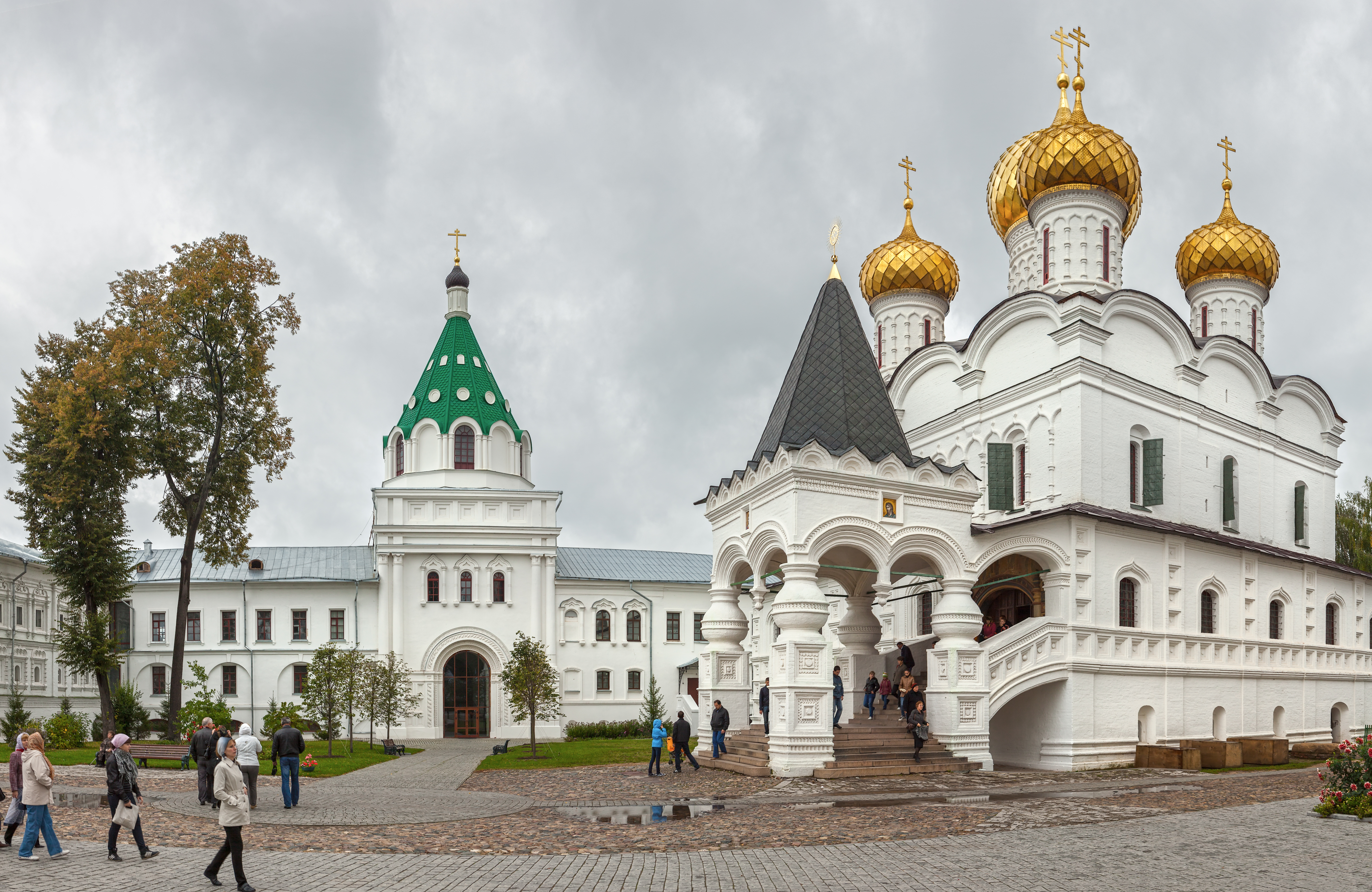
68. Kostroma

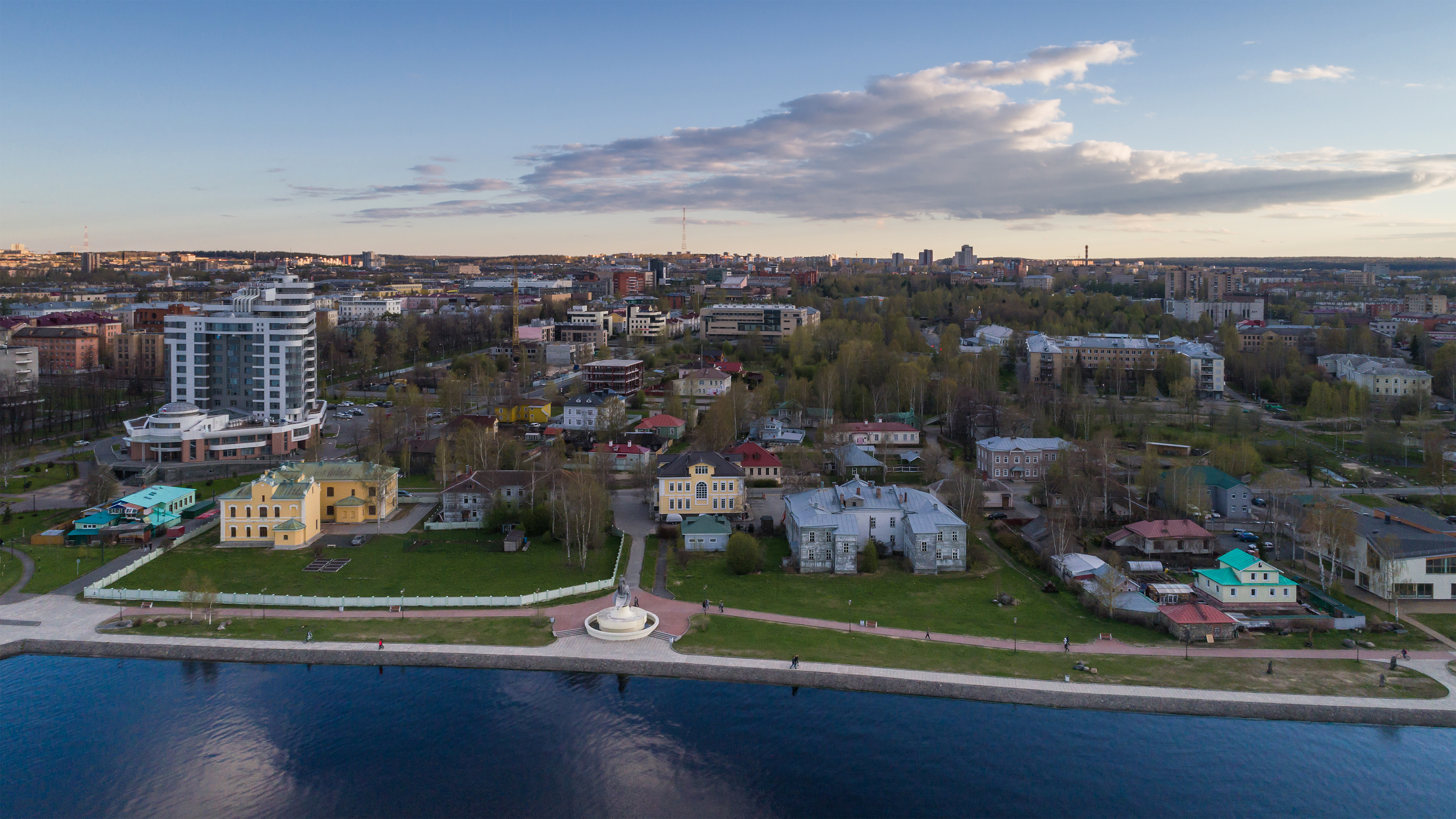
69. Petrozavodsk

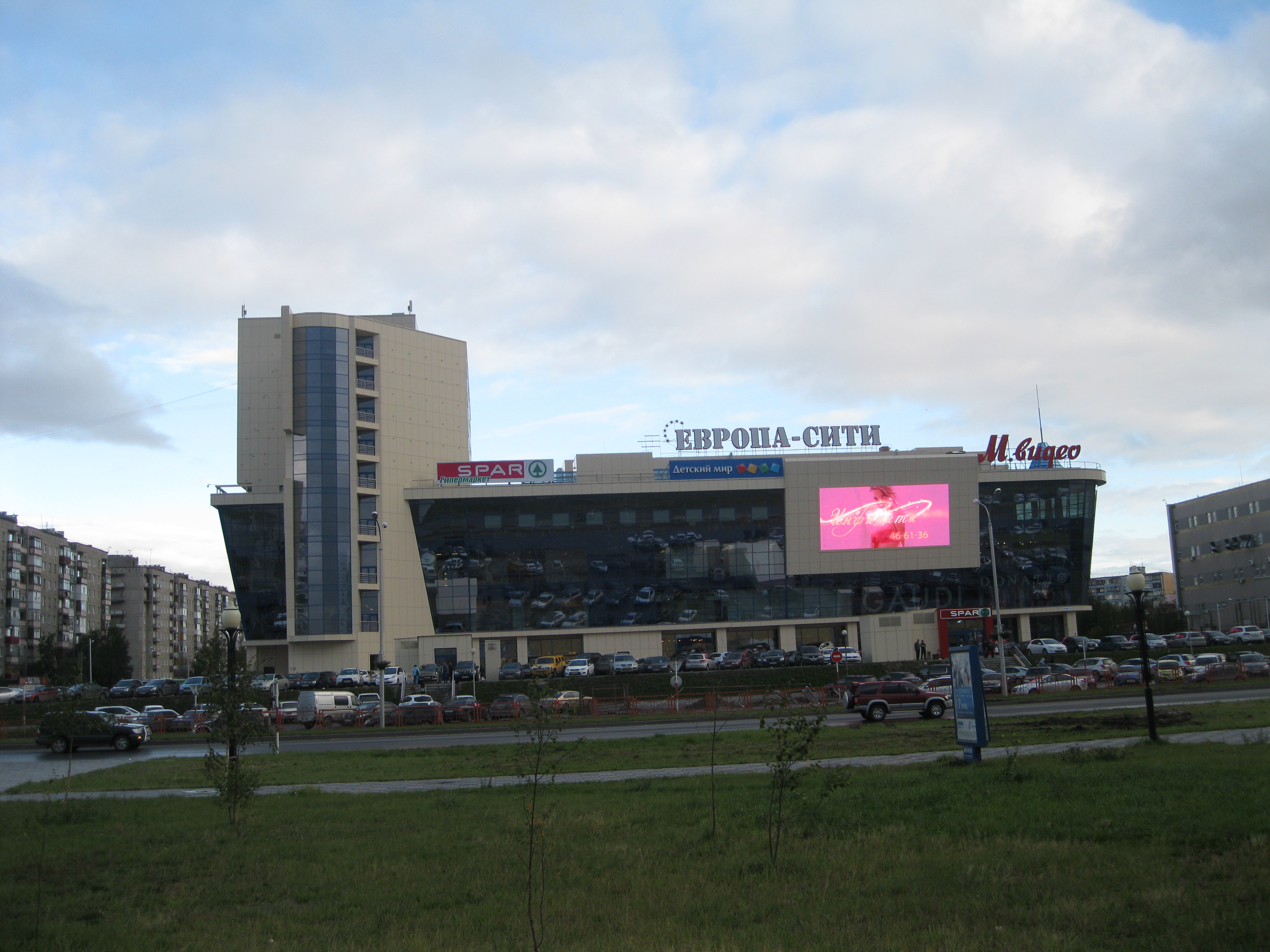
70. Nizhnevartovsk

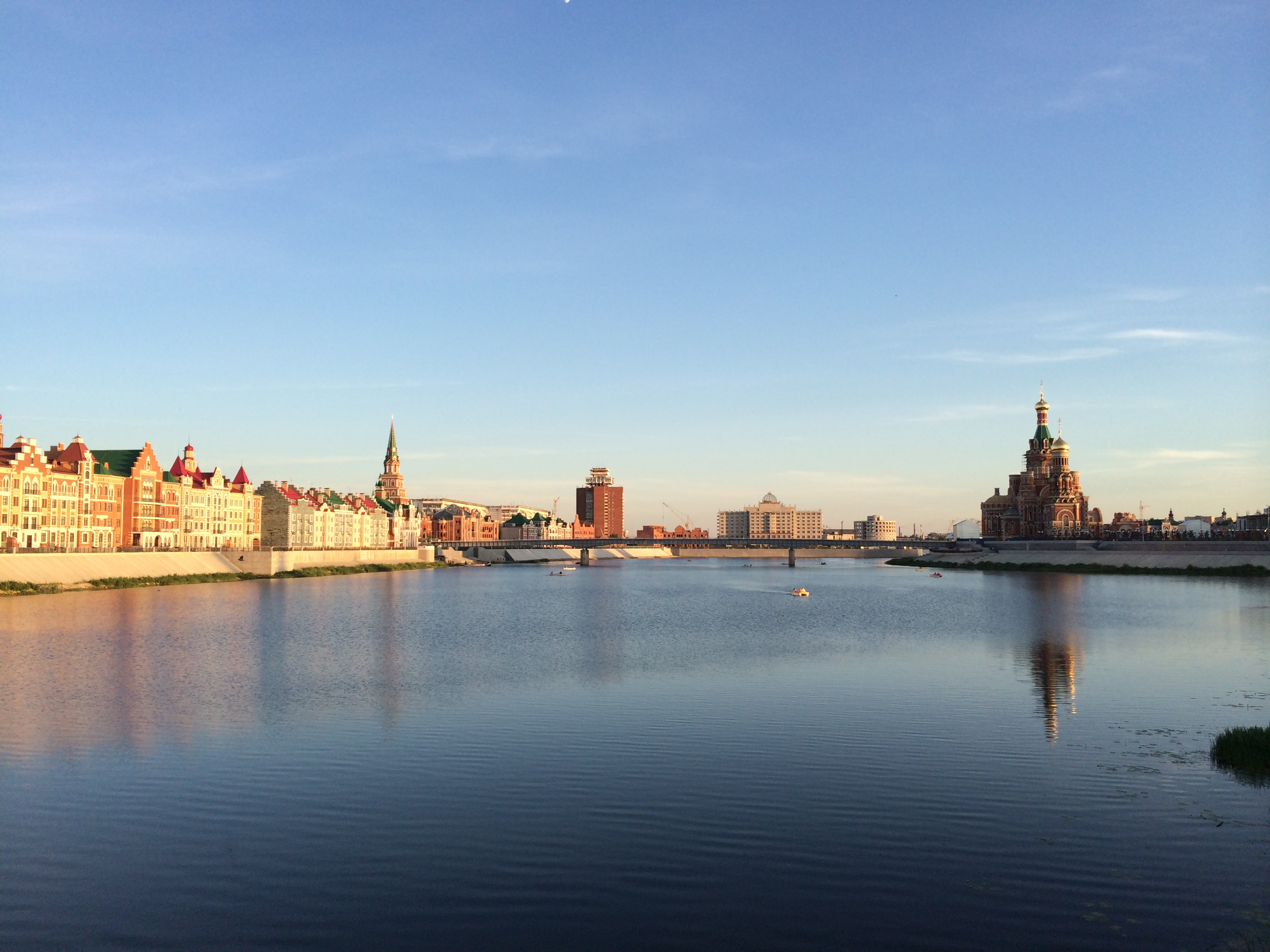
71. Yoshkar-Ola

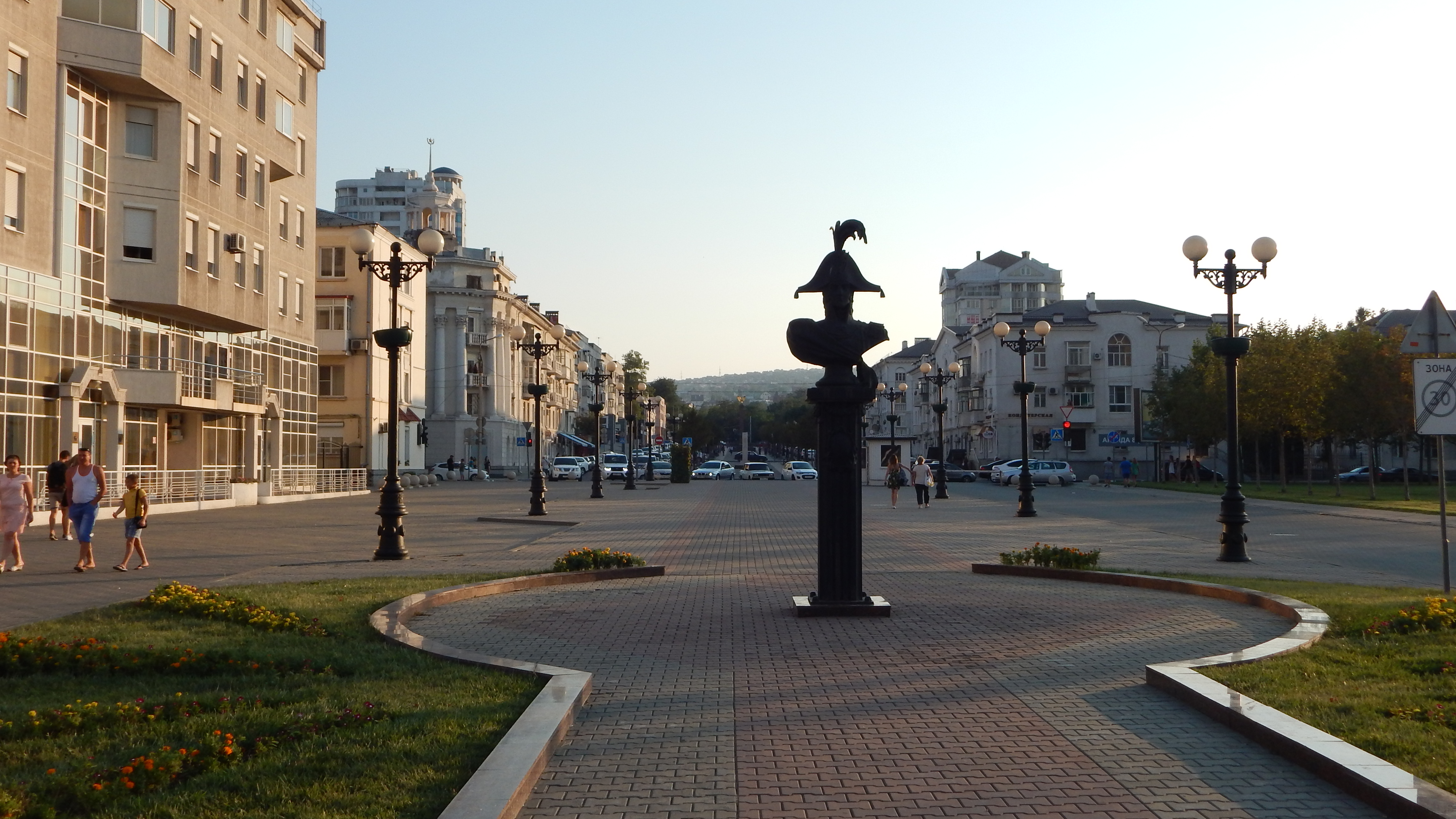
72. Novorossiysk

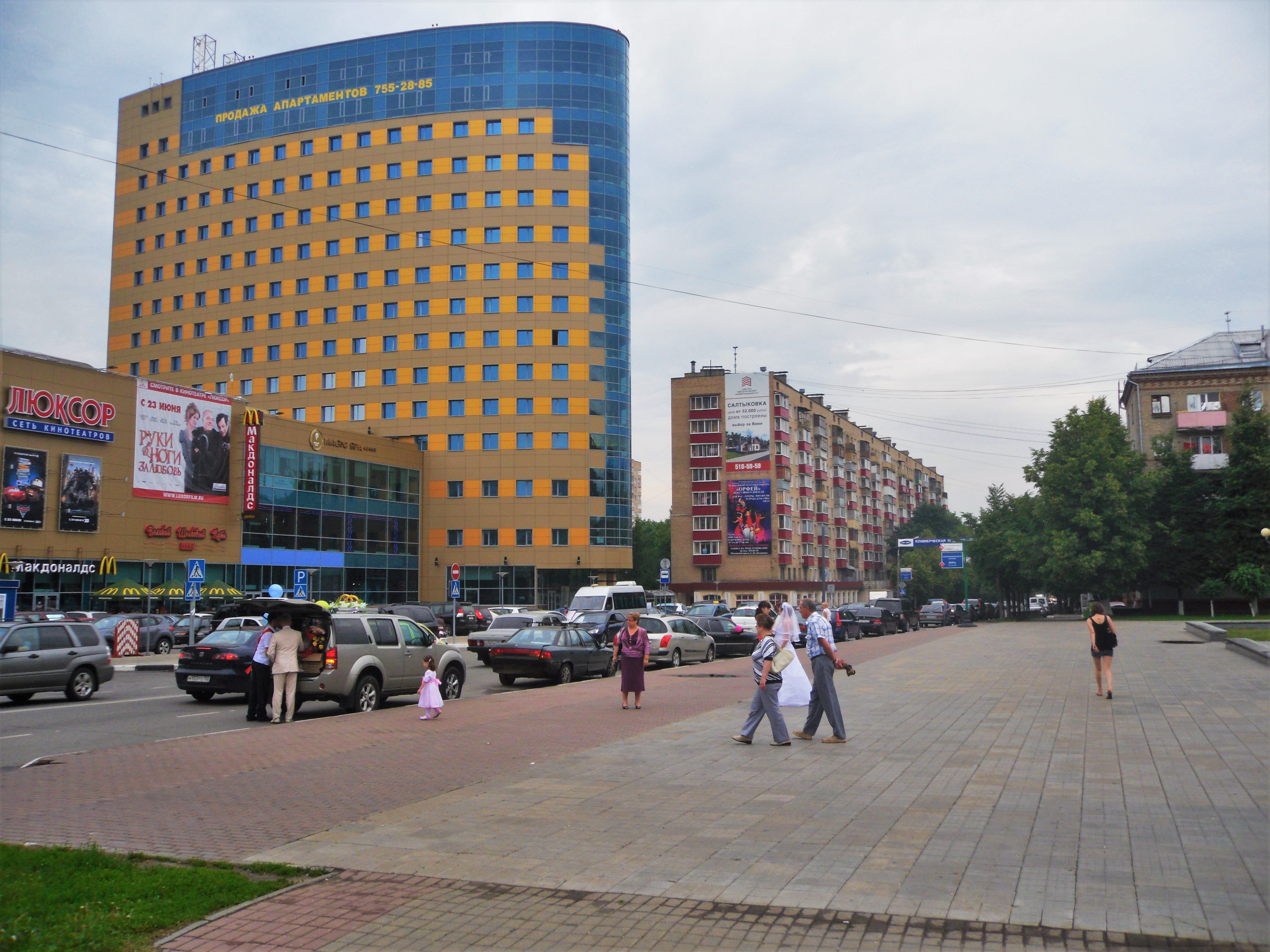
73. Balashikha

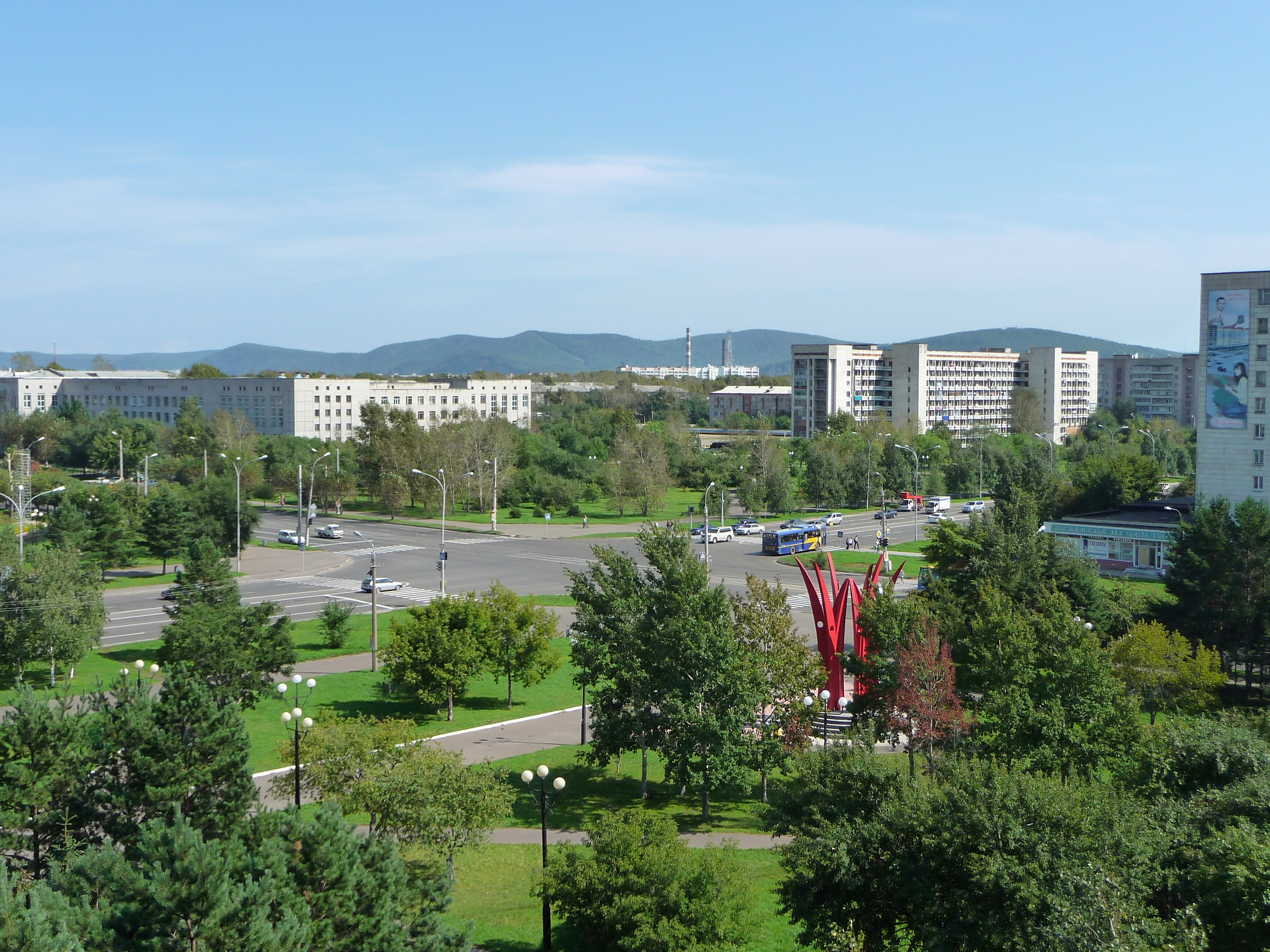
74. Komsomolsk-on-Amur

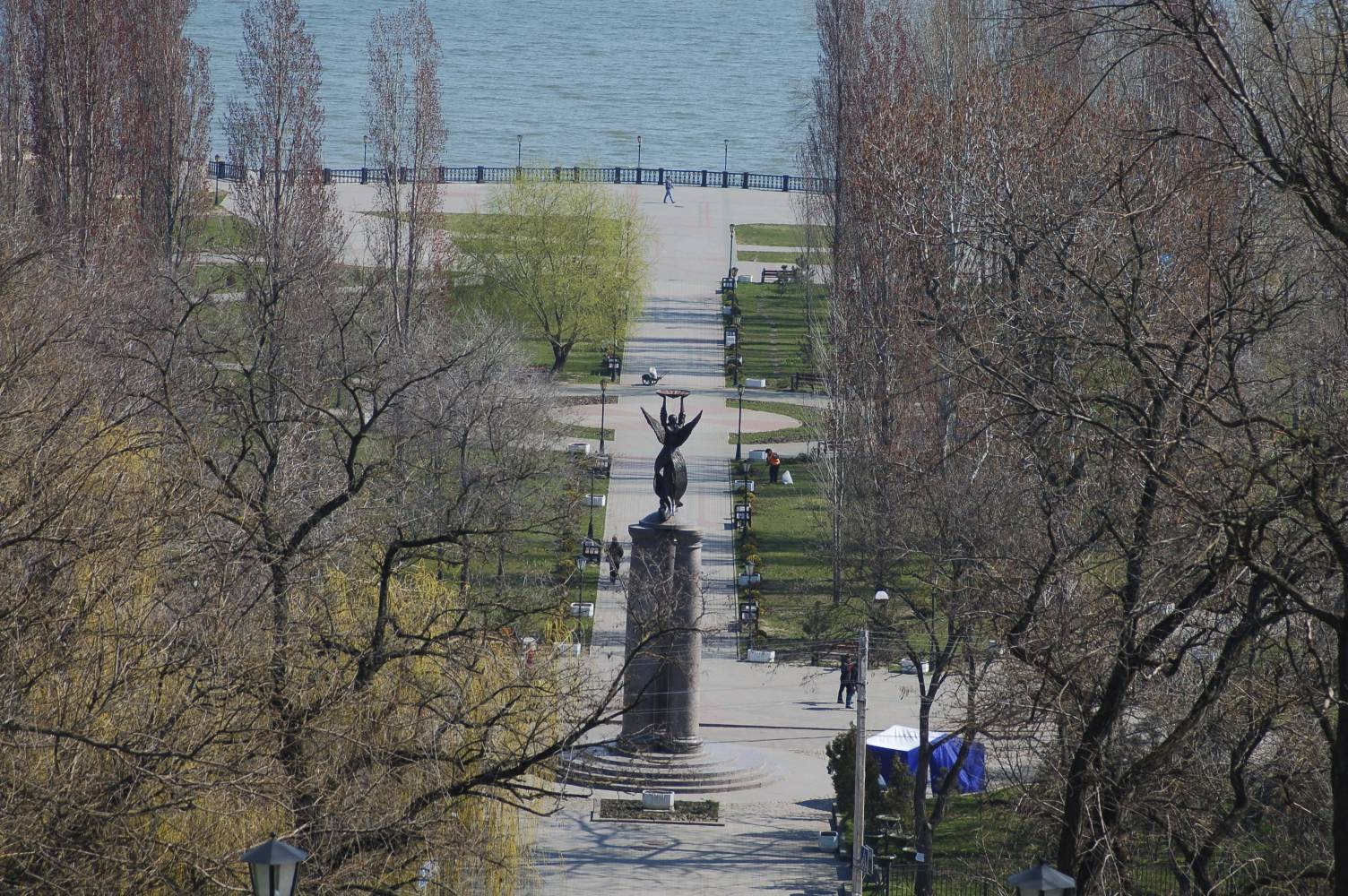
75. Taganrog

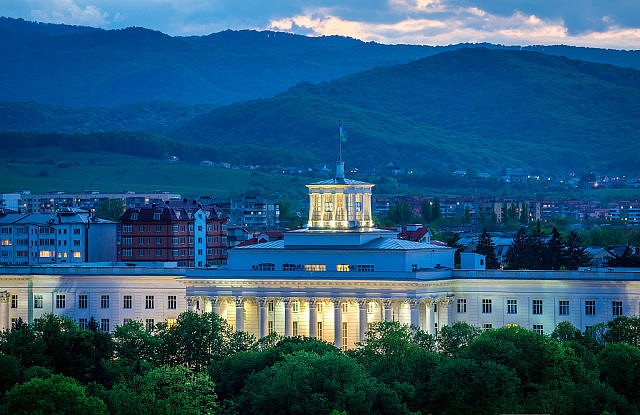
77. Nalchik

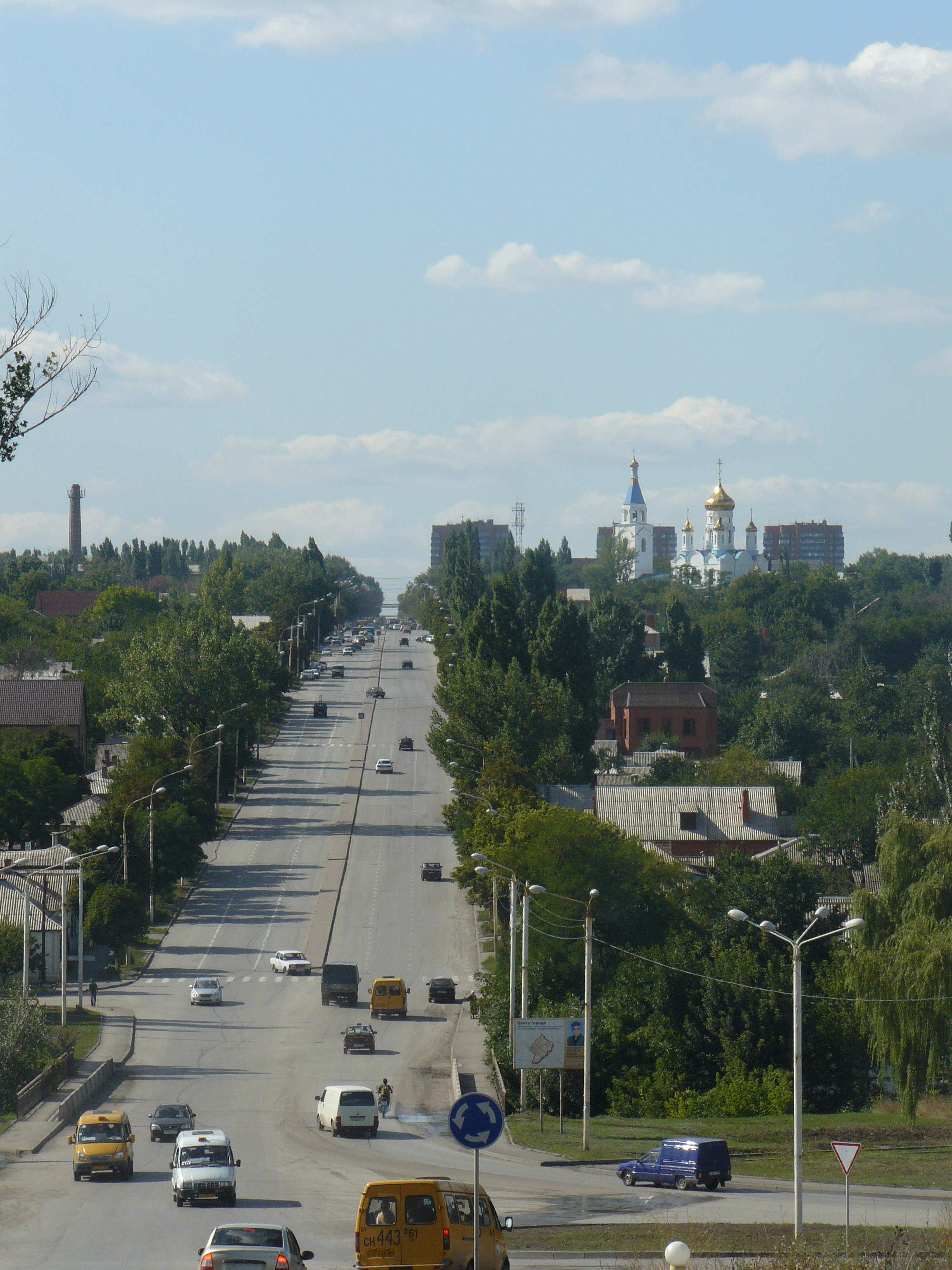
78. Shakhty

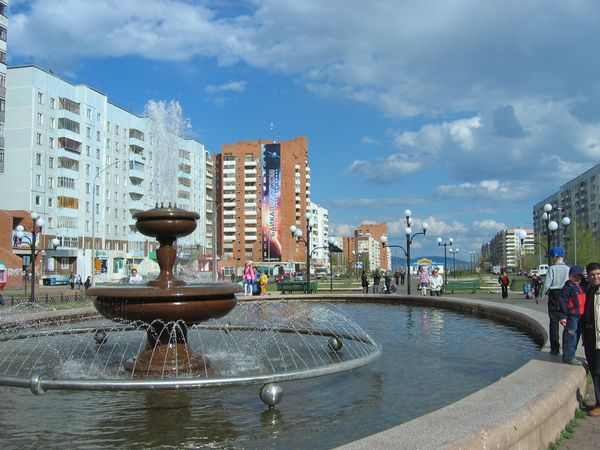
79. Bratsk

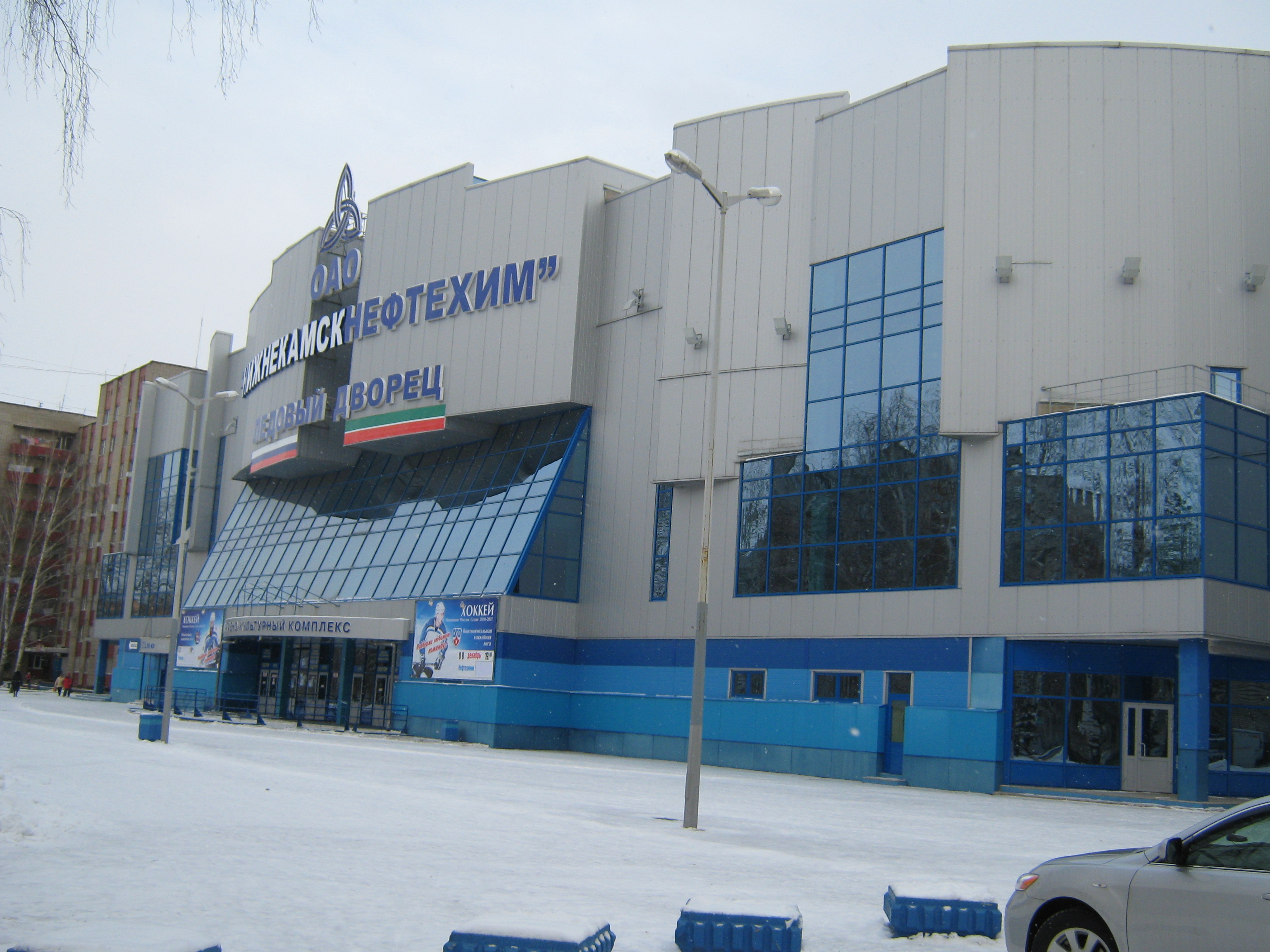
80. Nizhnekamsk

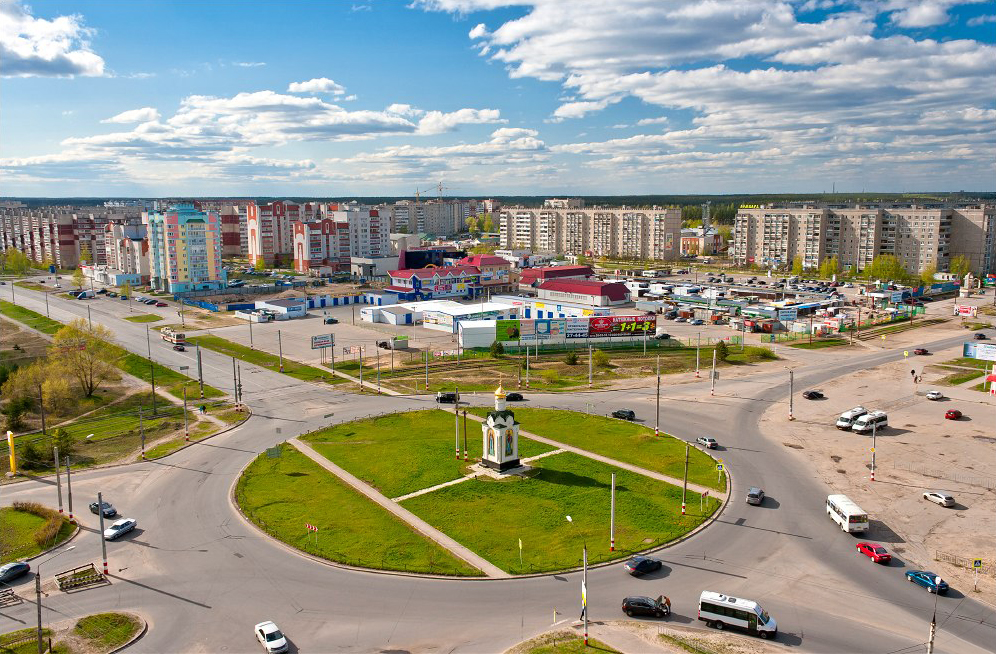
81. Dzerzhinsk

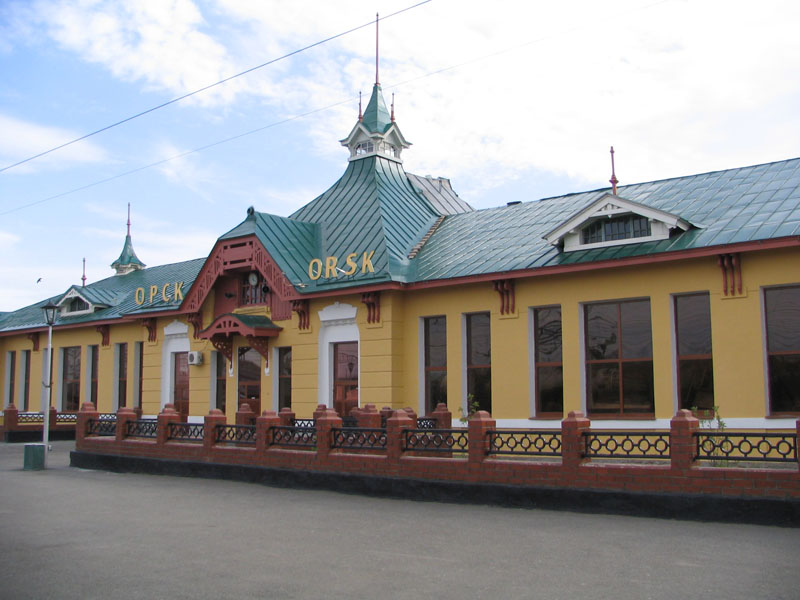
82. Orsk

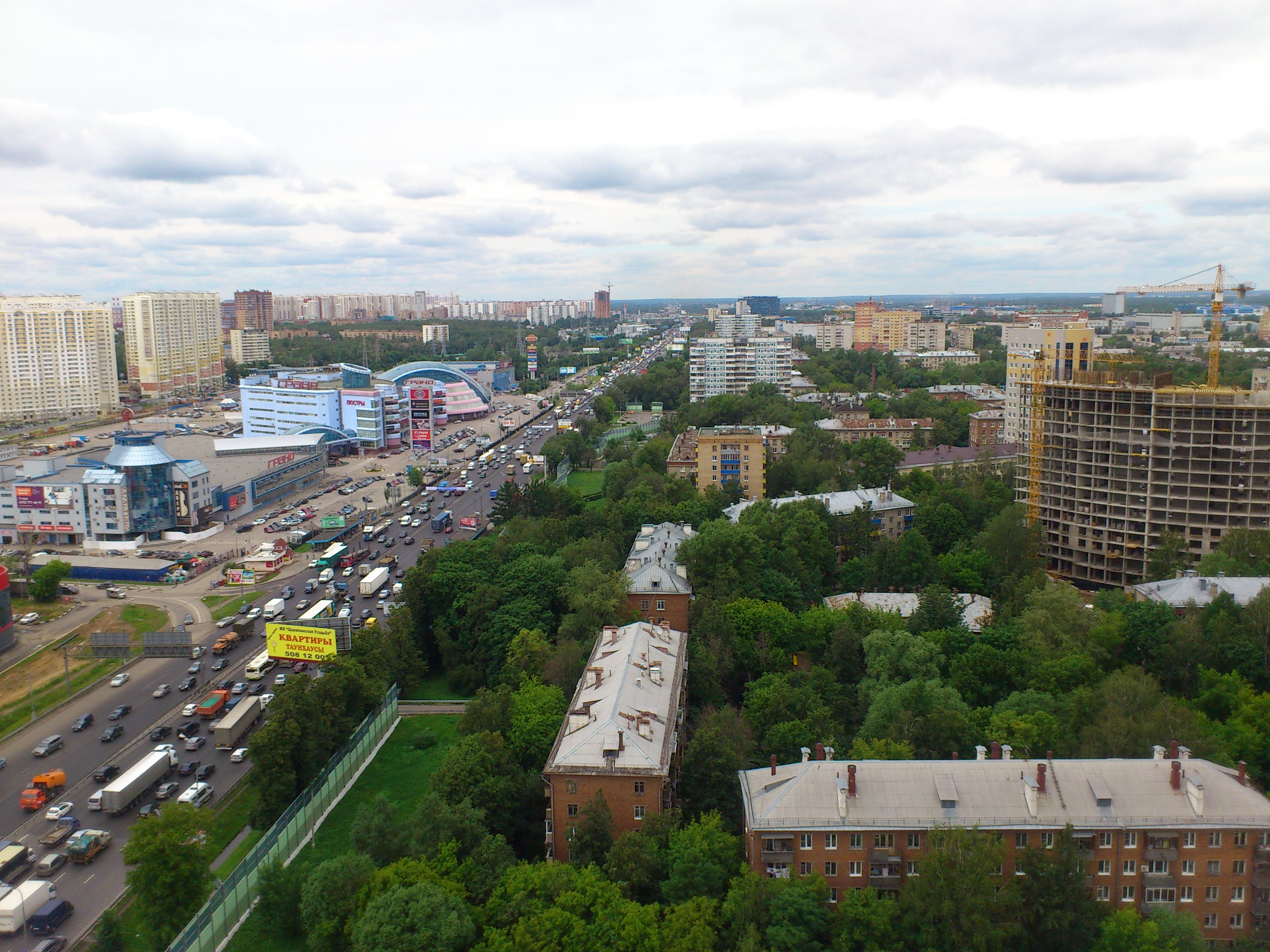
83. Khimki

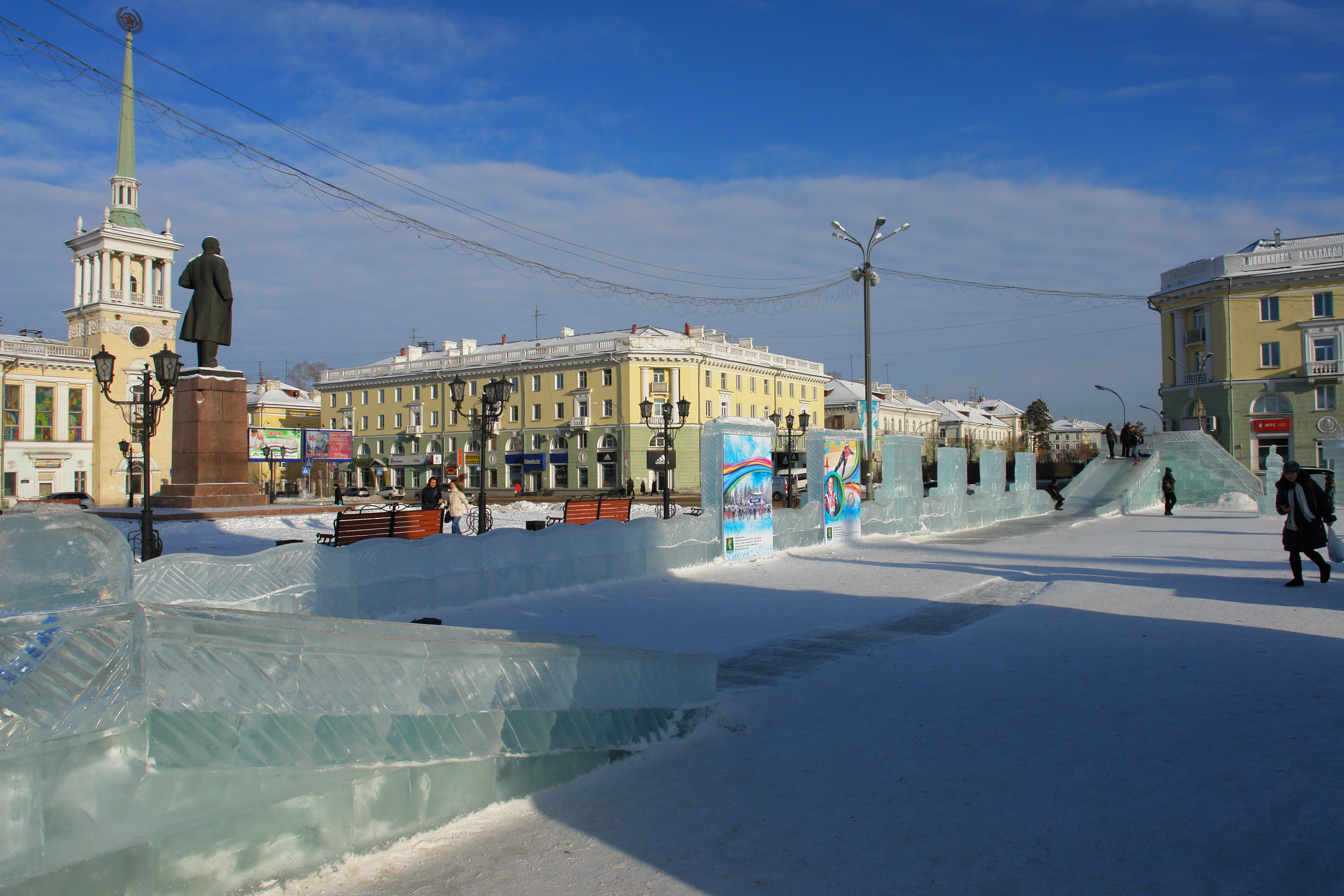
84. Angarsk

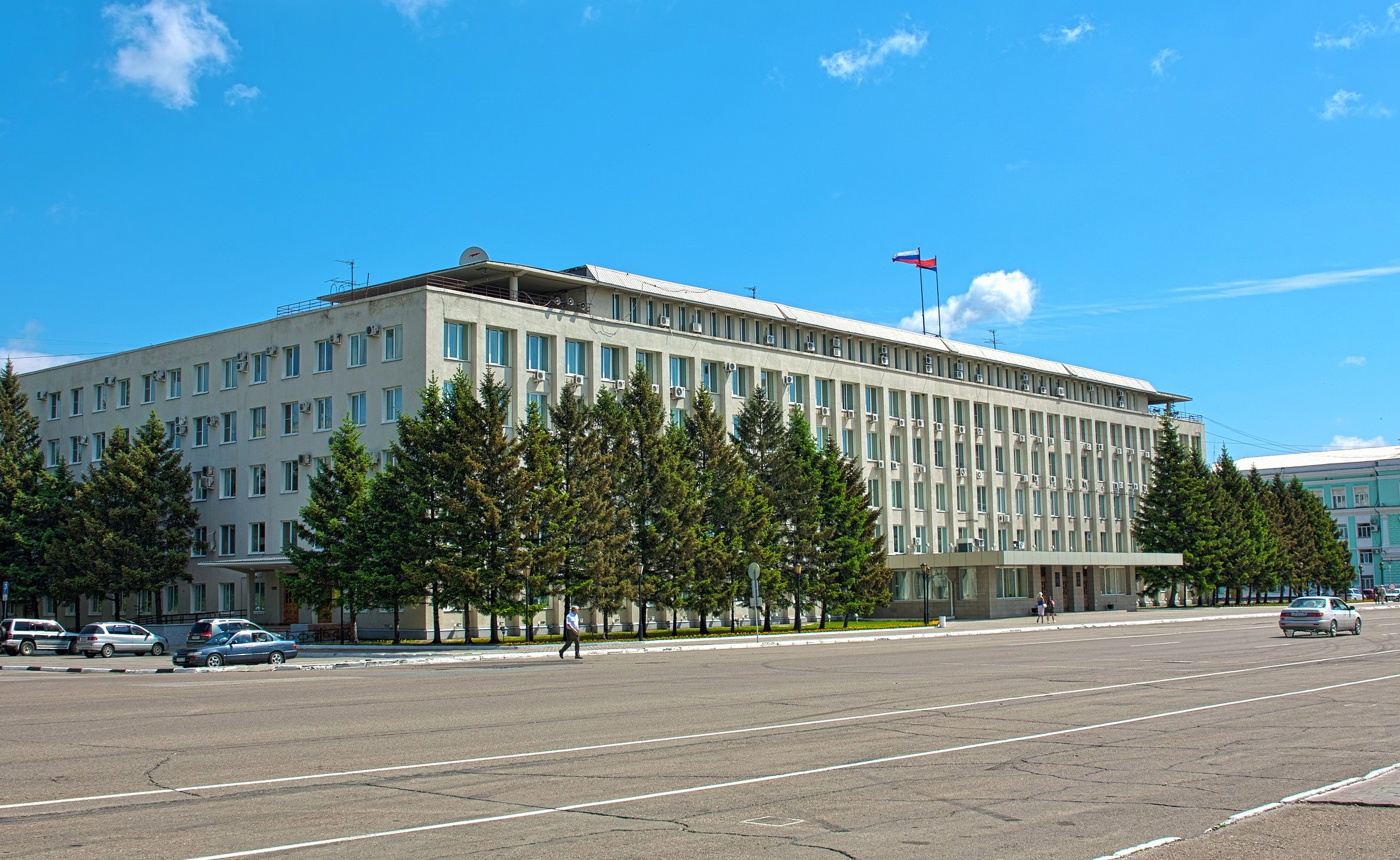
85. Blagoveshchensk

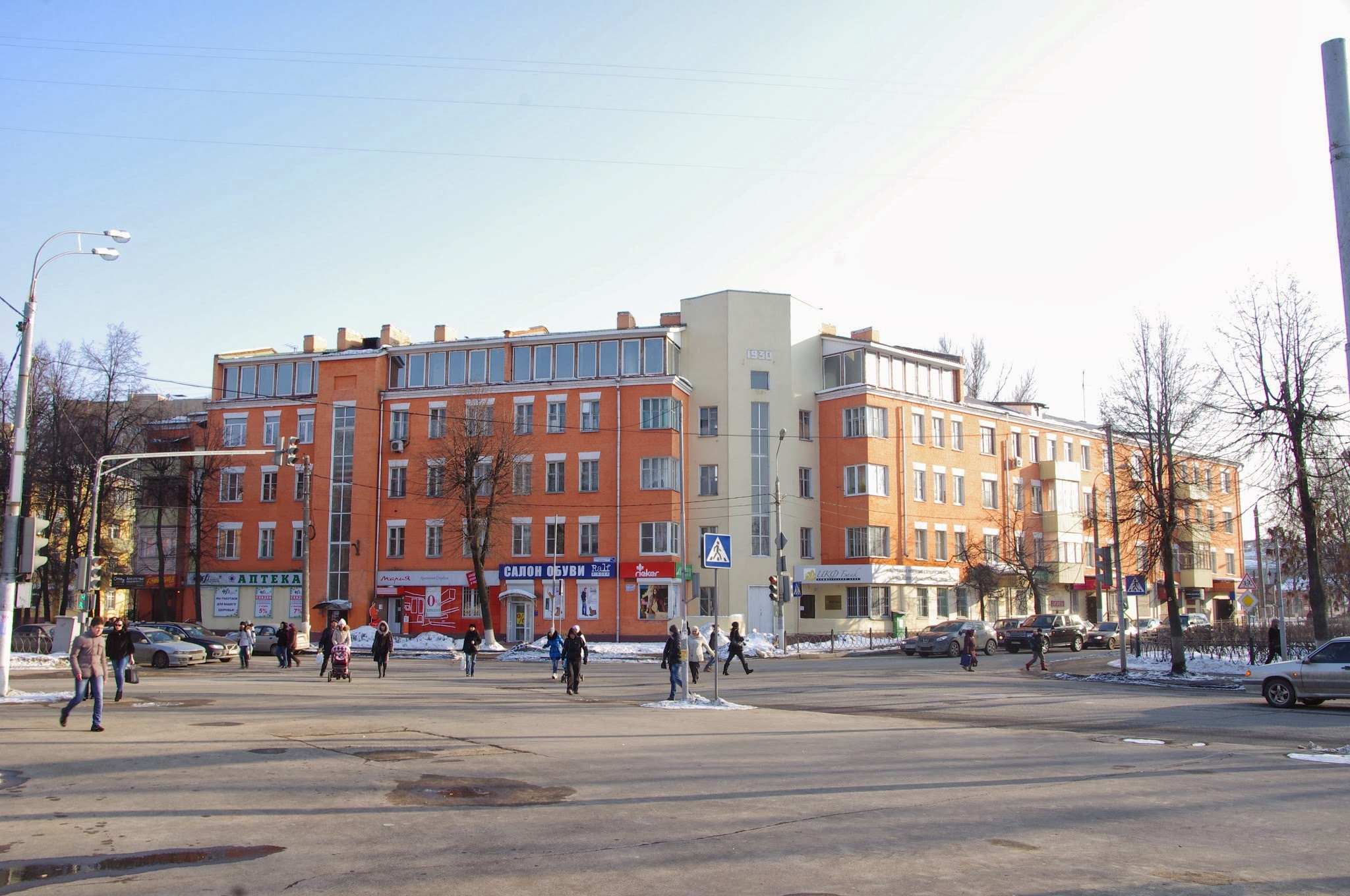
86. Podolsk

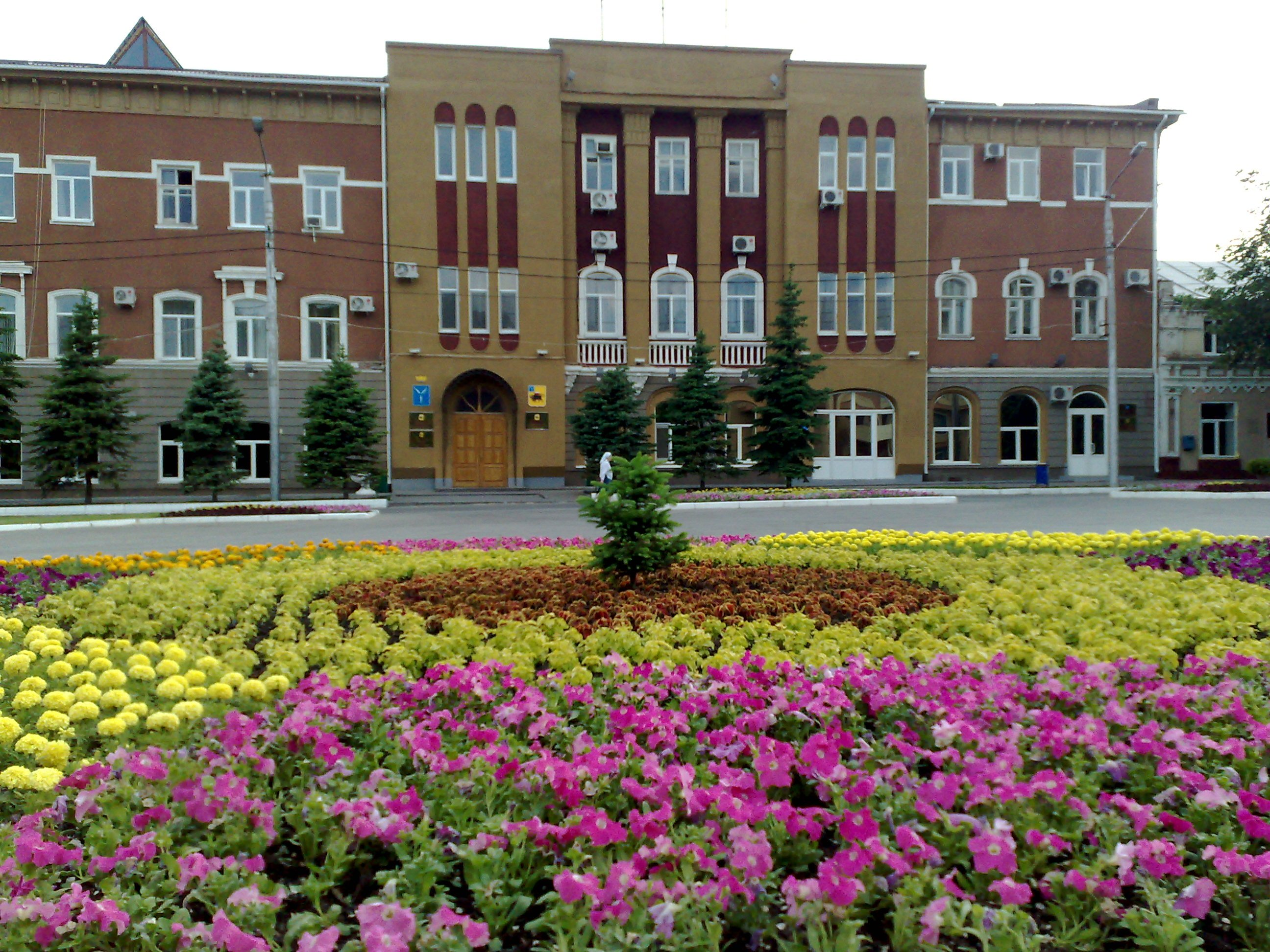
87. Engels

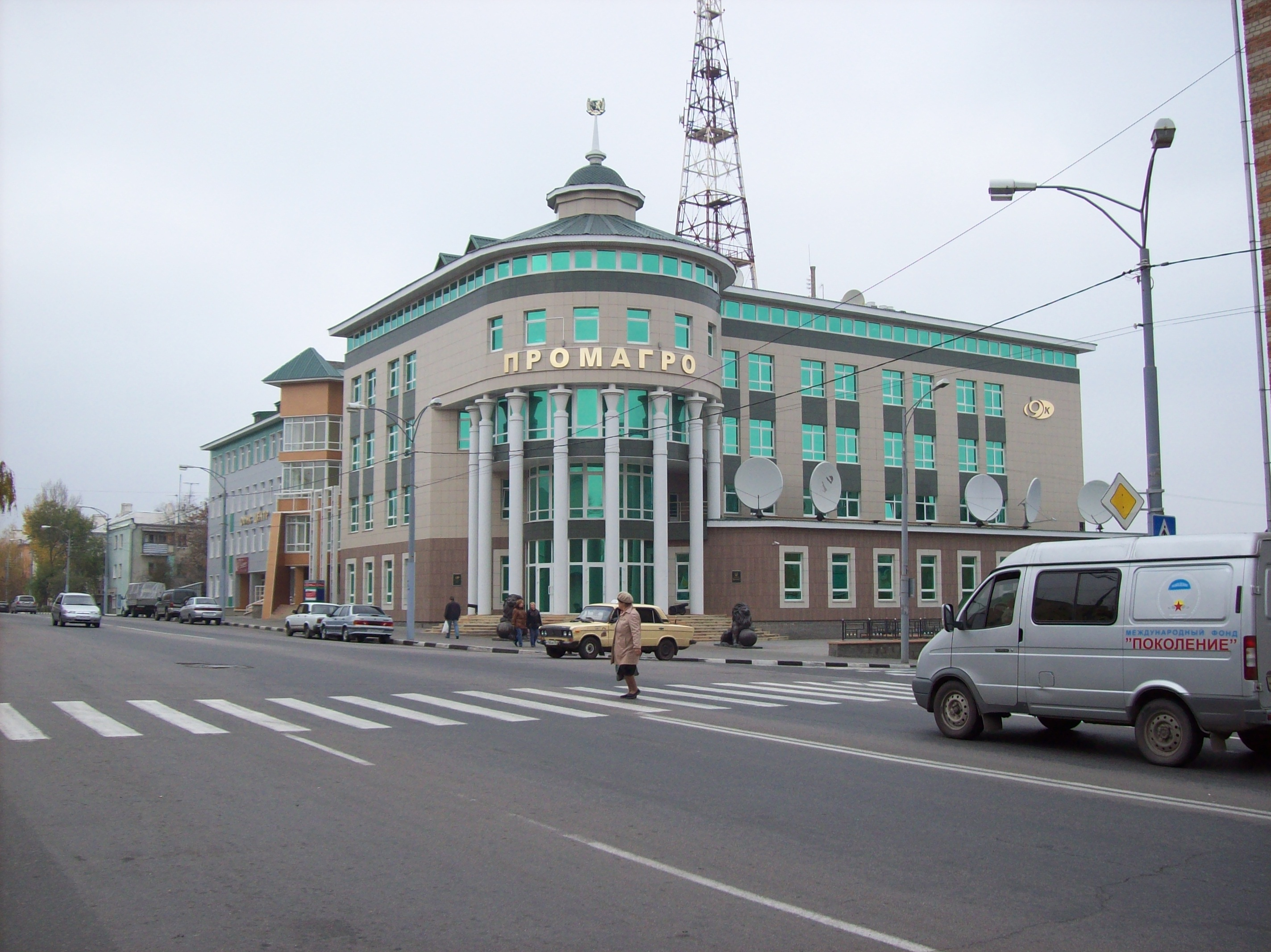
88. Stary Oskol

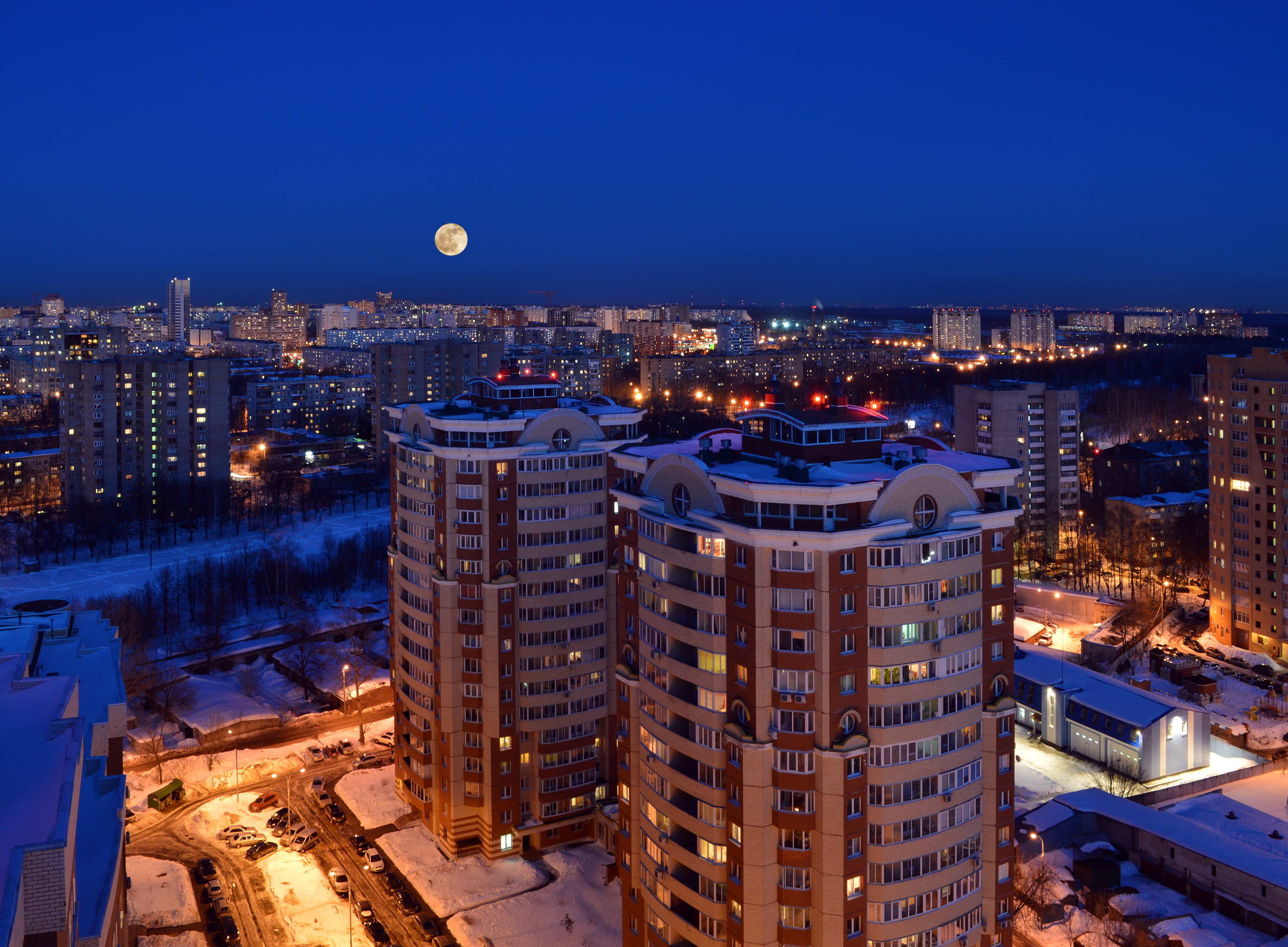
89. Korolyov

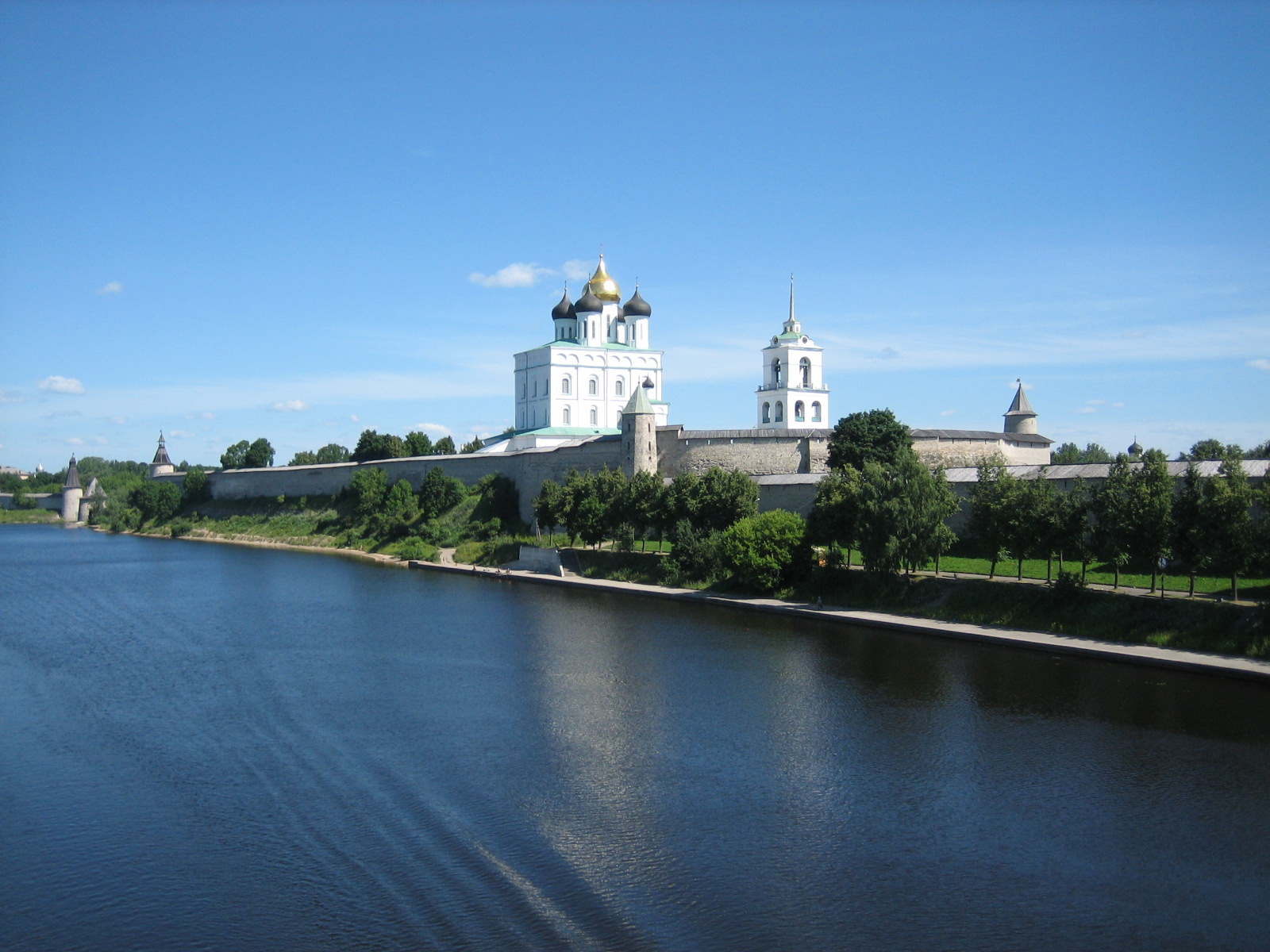
90. Pskov

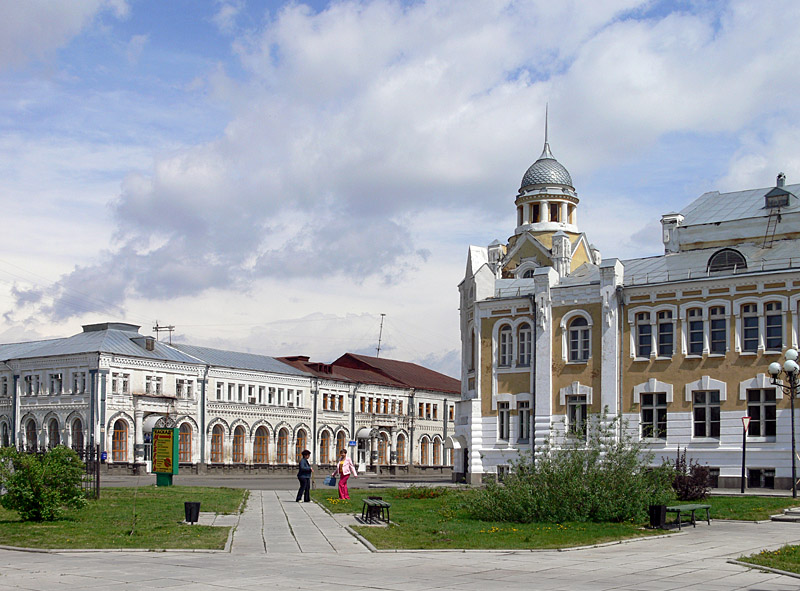
91. Biysk

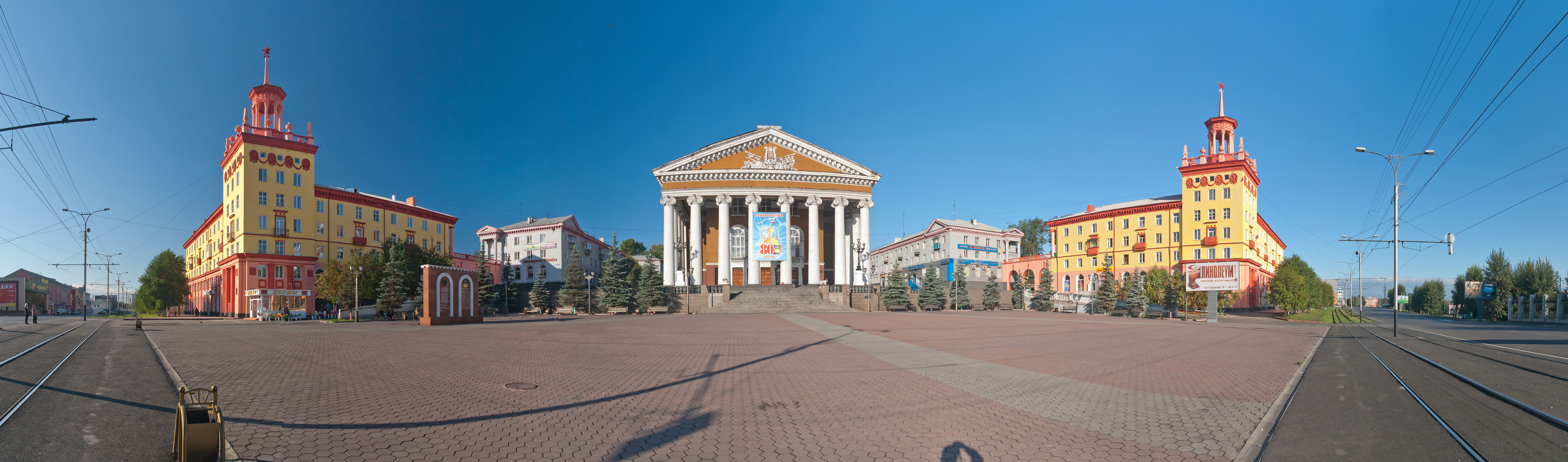
92. Prokopyevsk

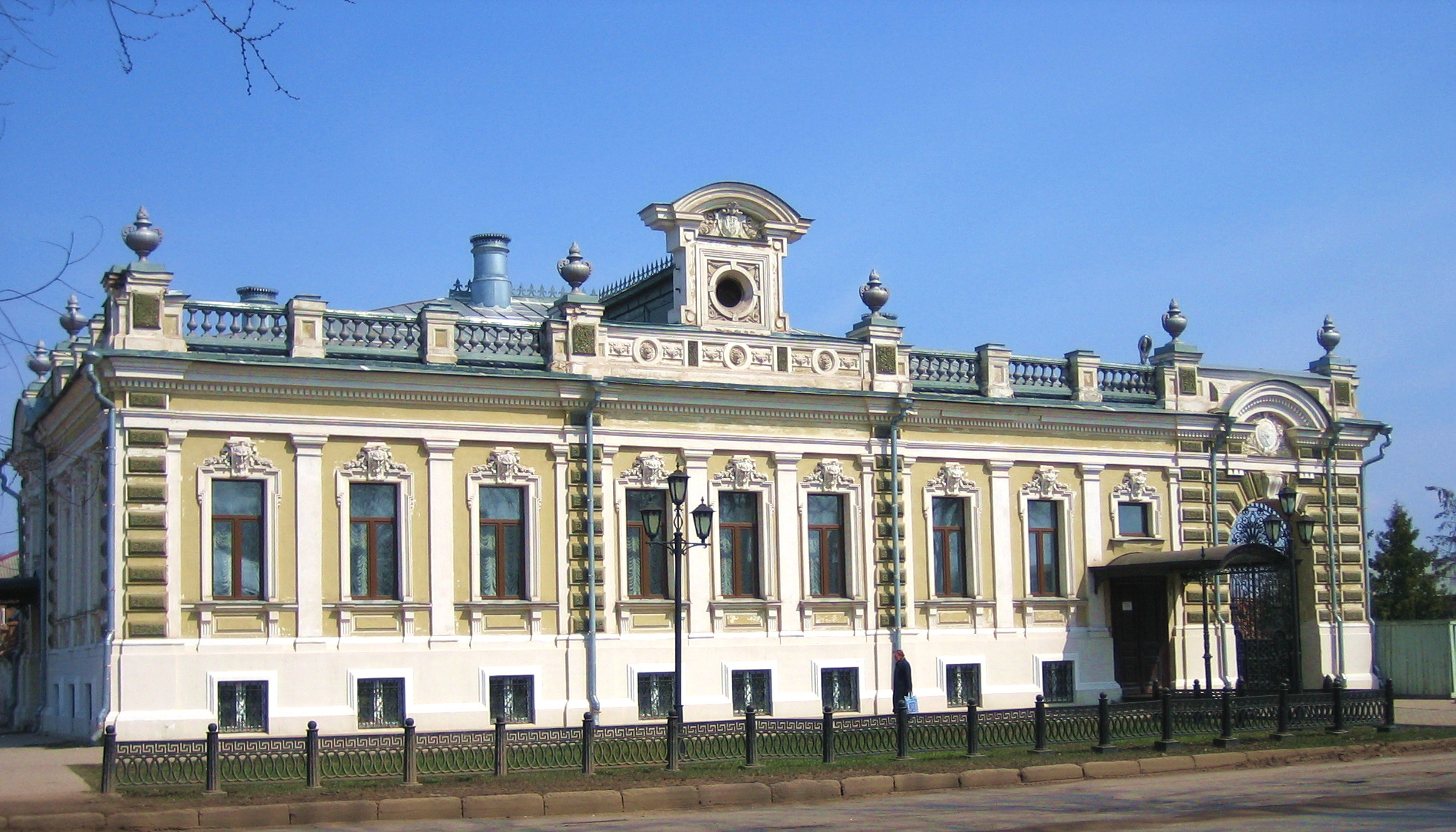
93. Balakovo

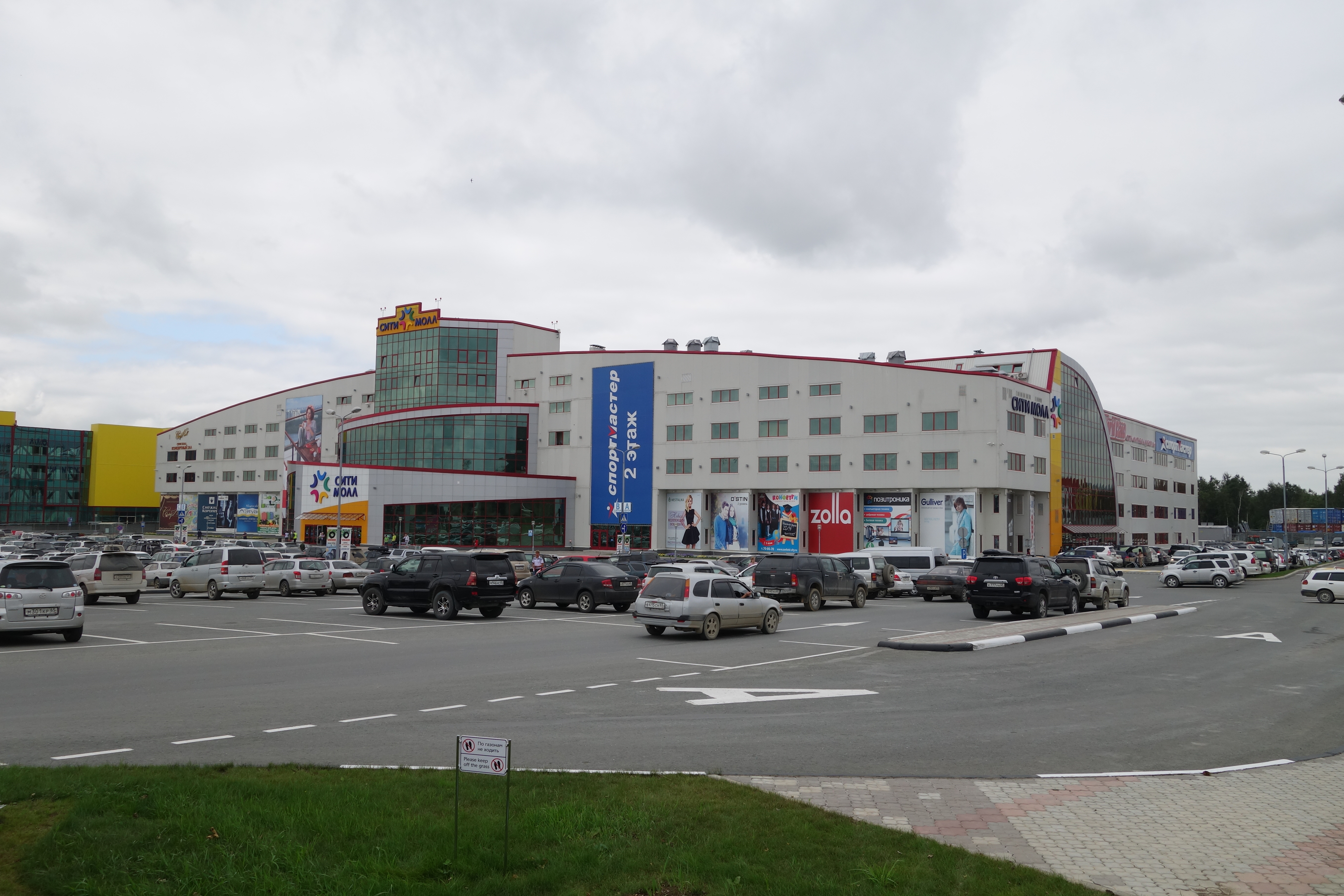
95. Yuzhno-Sakhalinsk

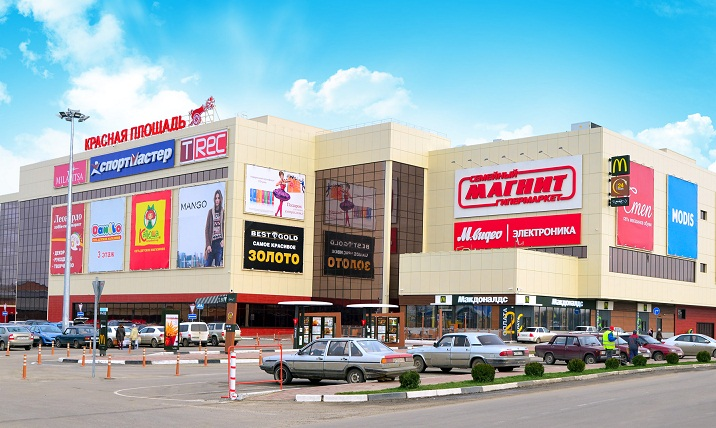
96. Armavir

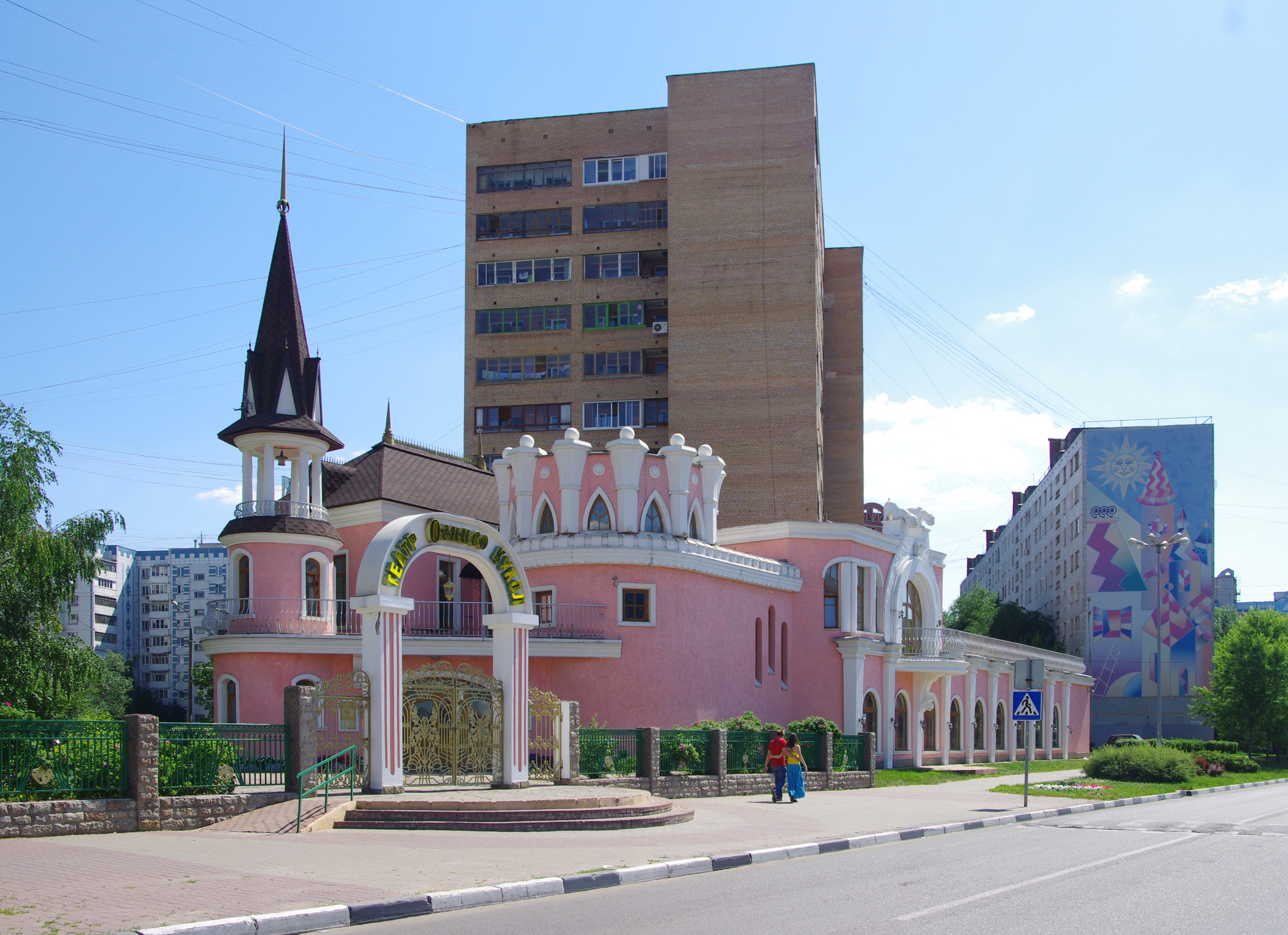
97. Mytishchi

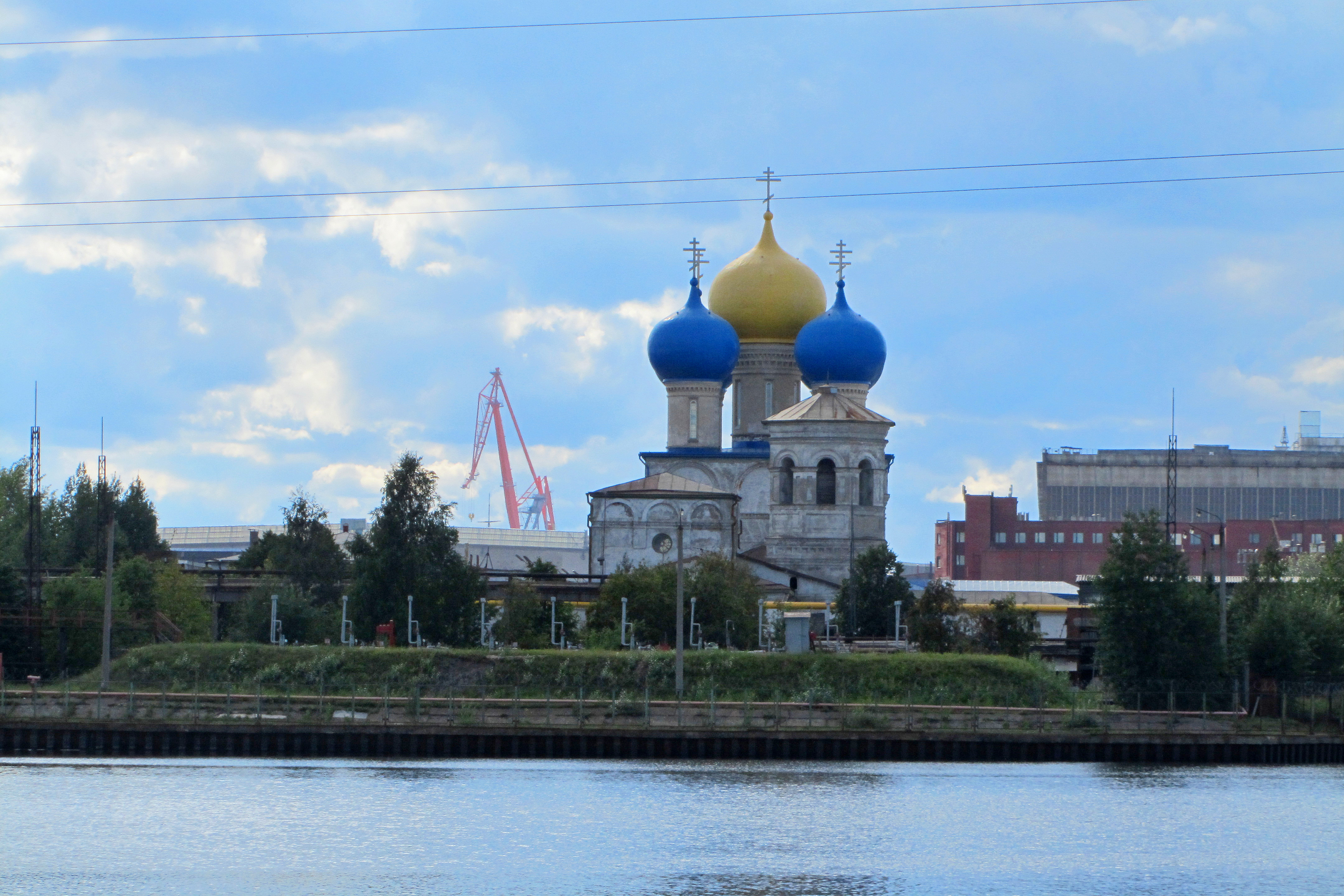
98. Severodvinsk

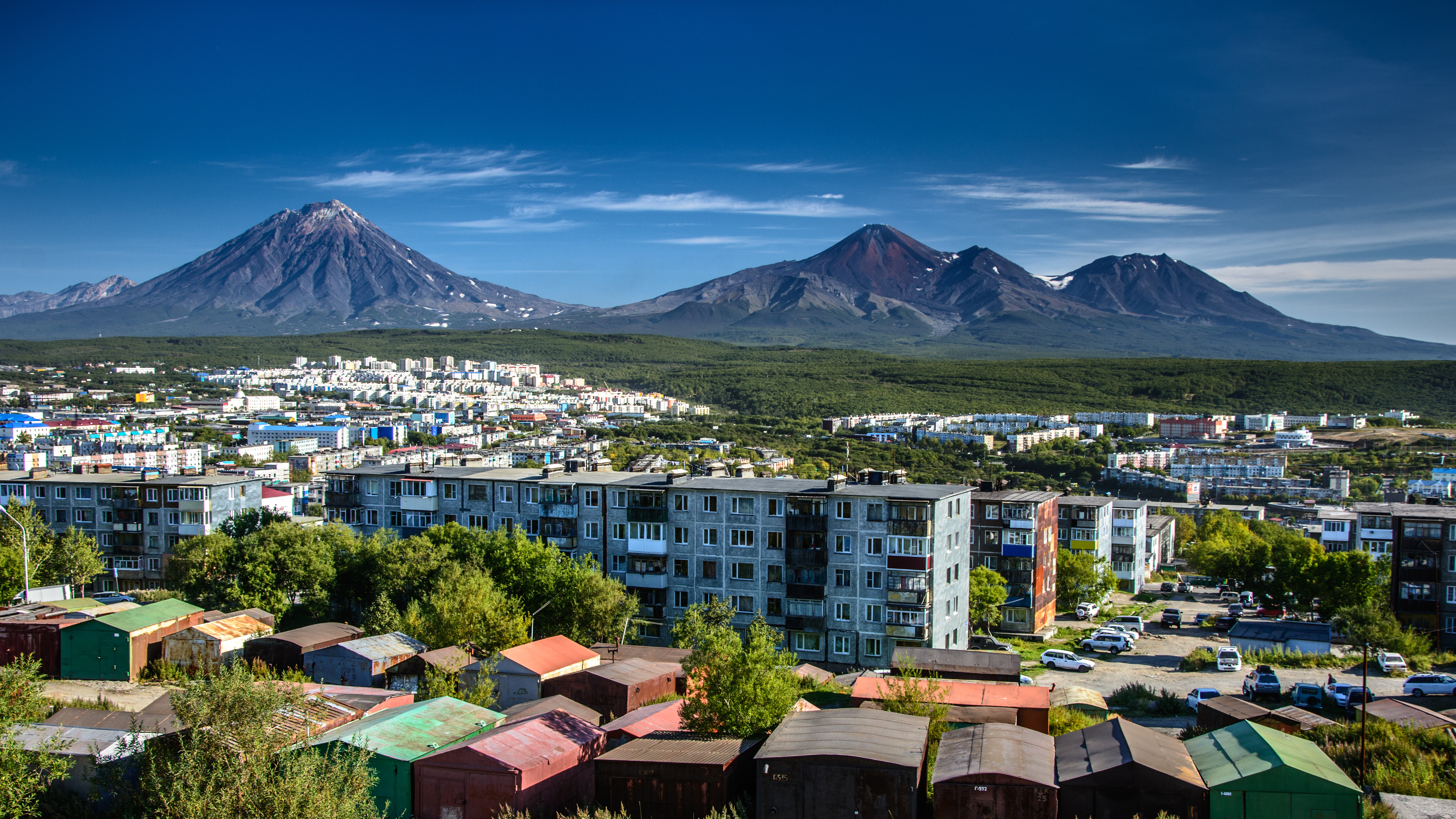
99. Petropavlovsk-Kamchatsky

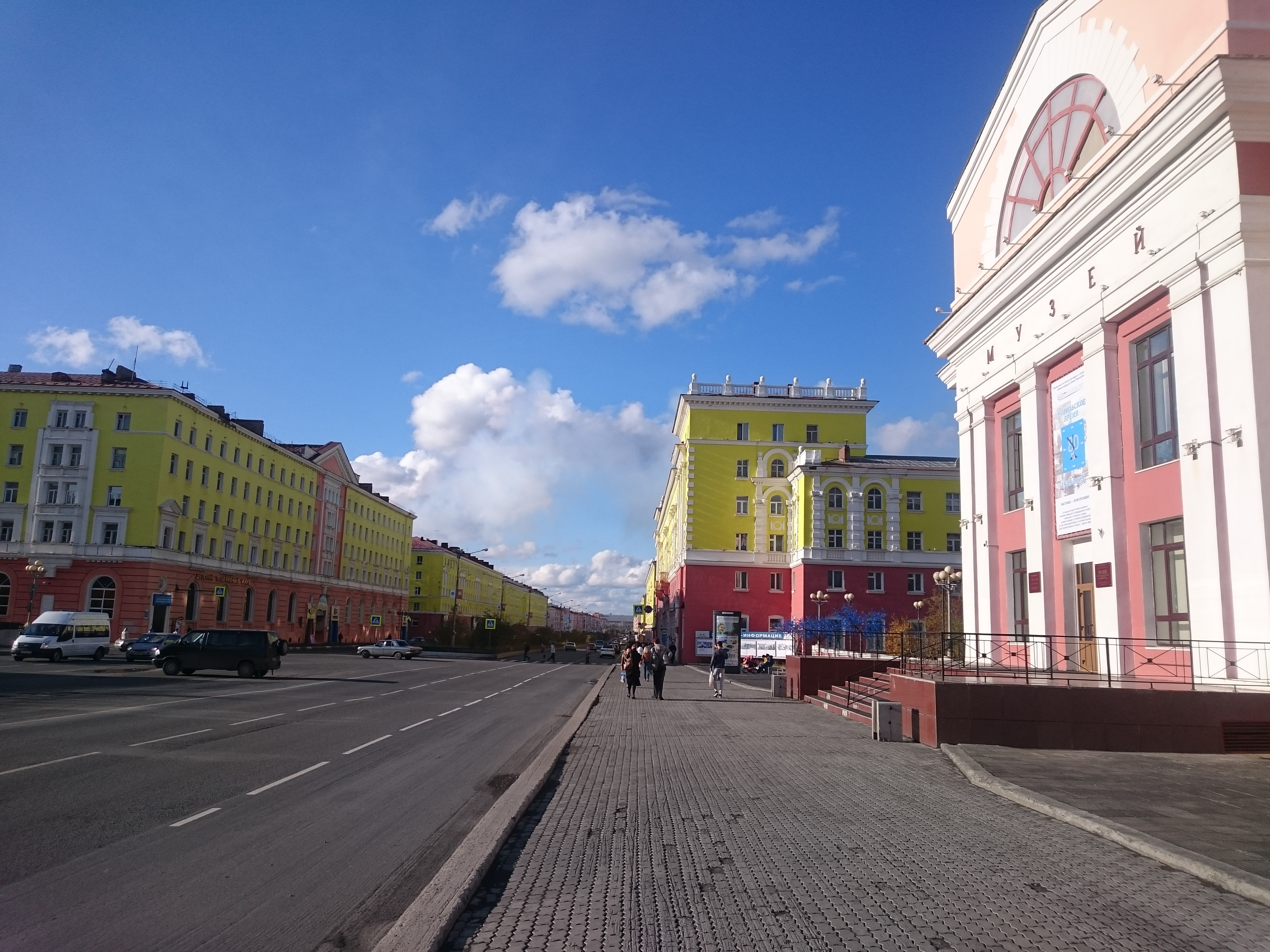
100. Norilsk

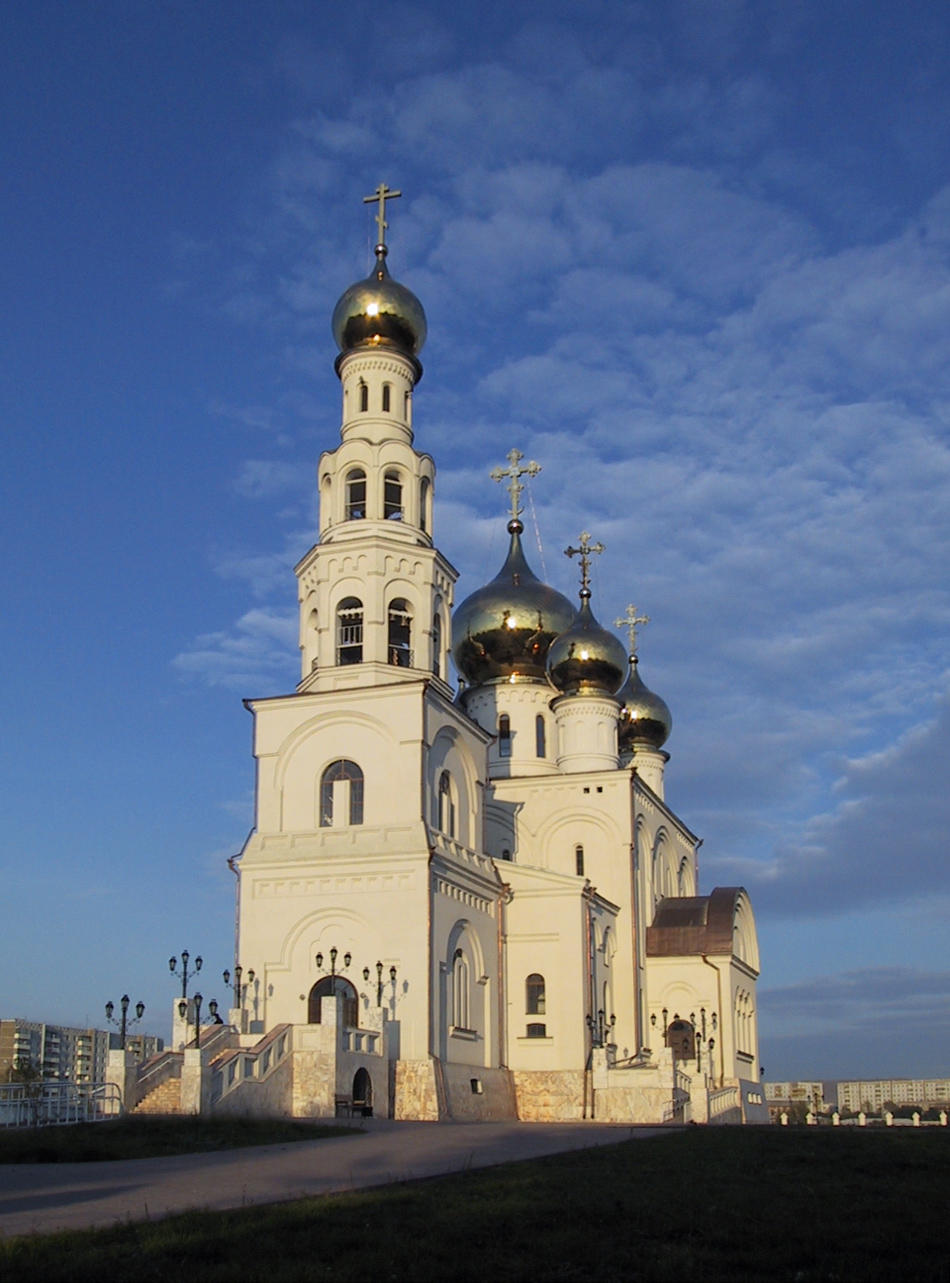
101. Abakan

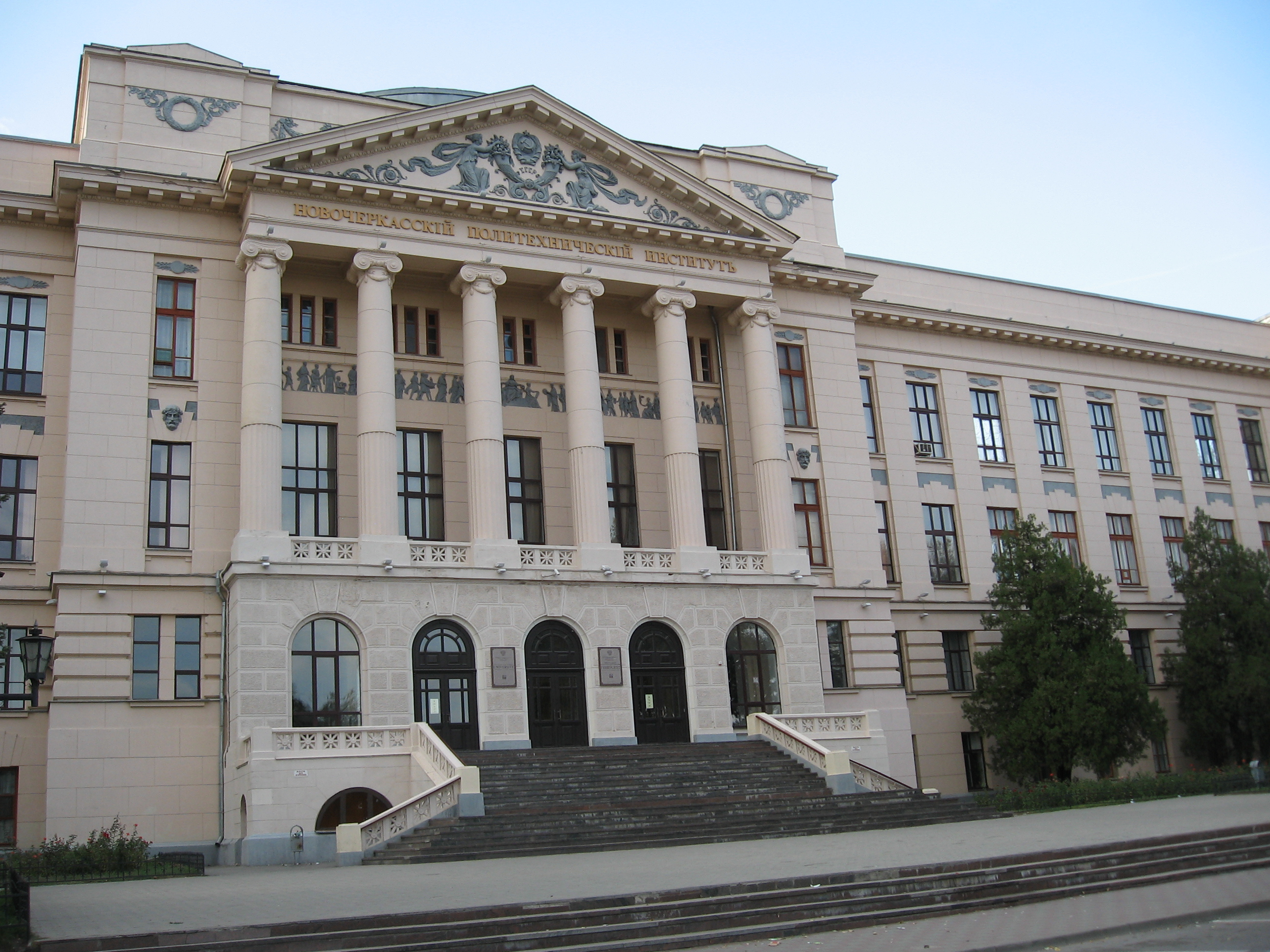
102. Novocherkassk

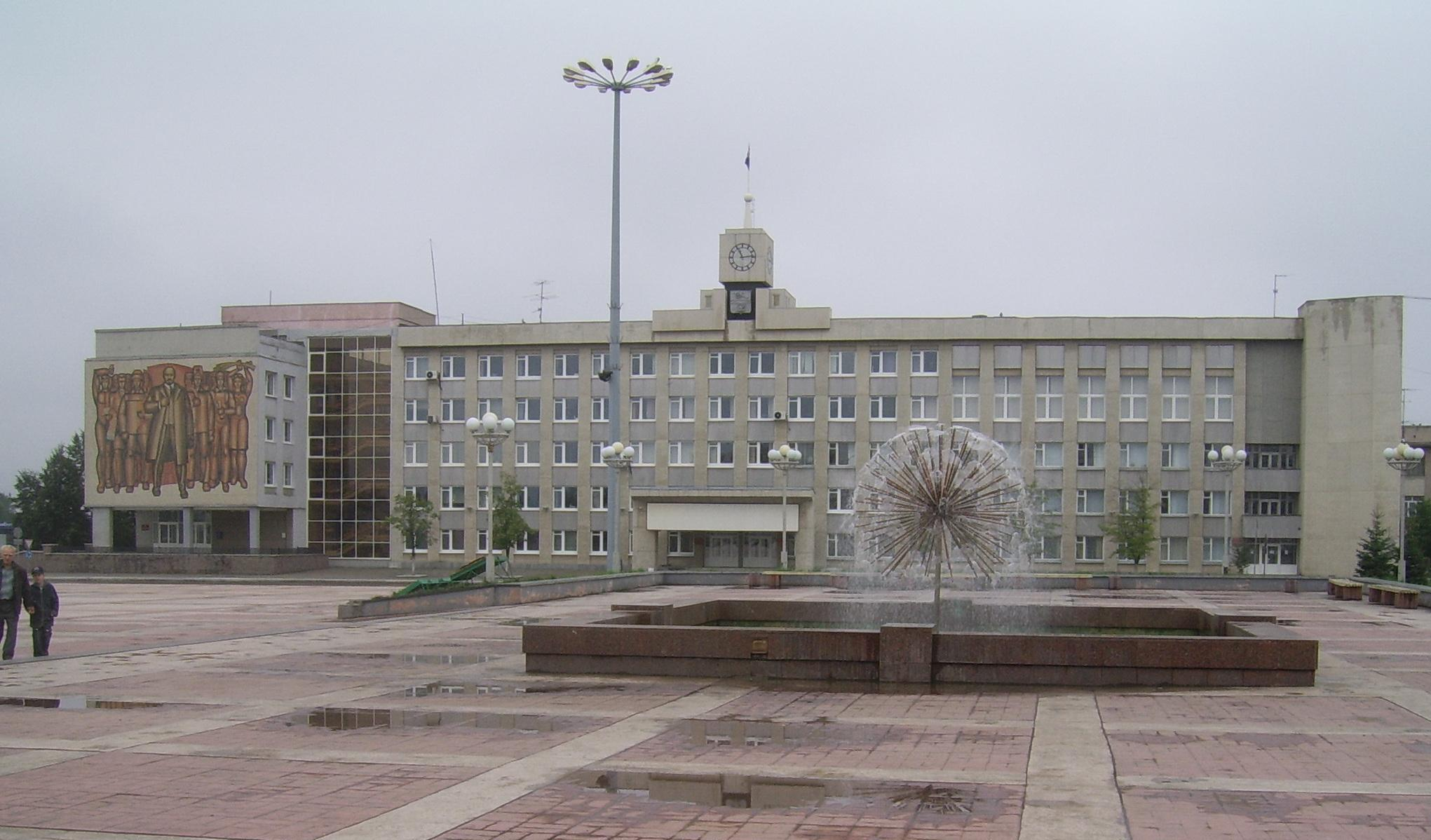
103. Kamensk-Uralsky

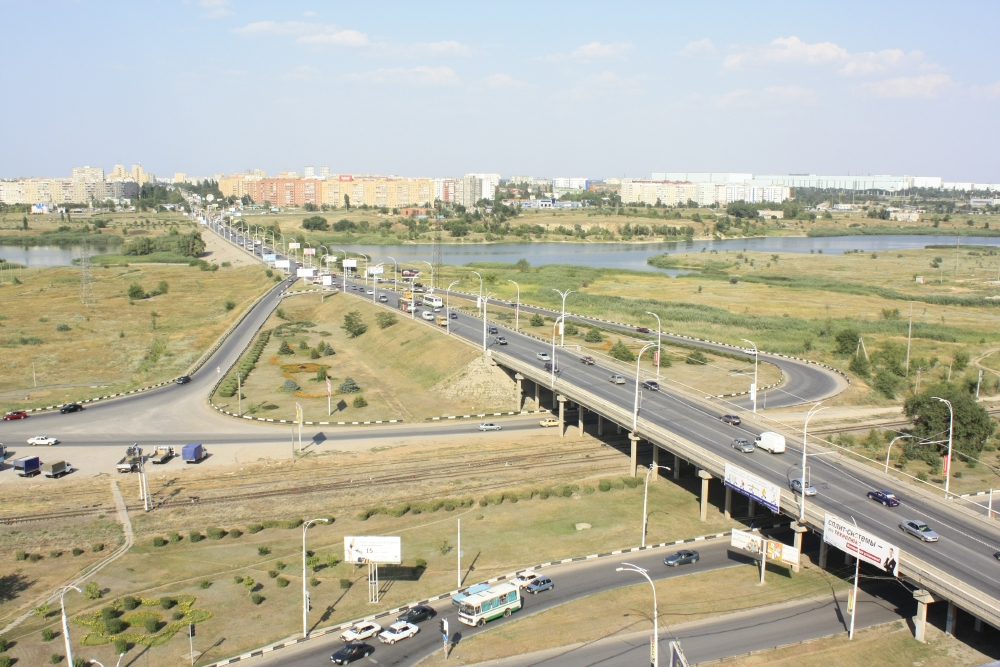
104. Volgodonsk

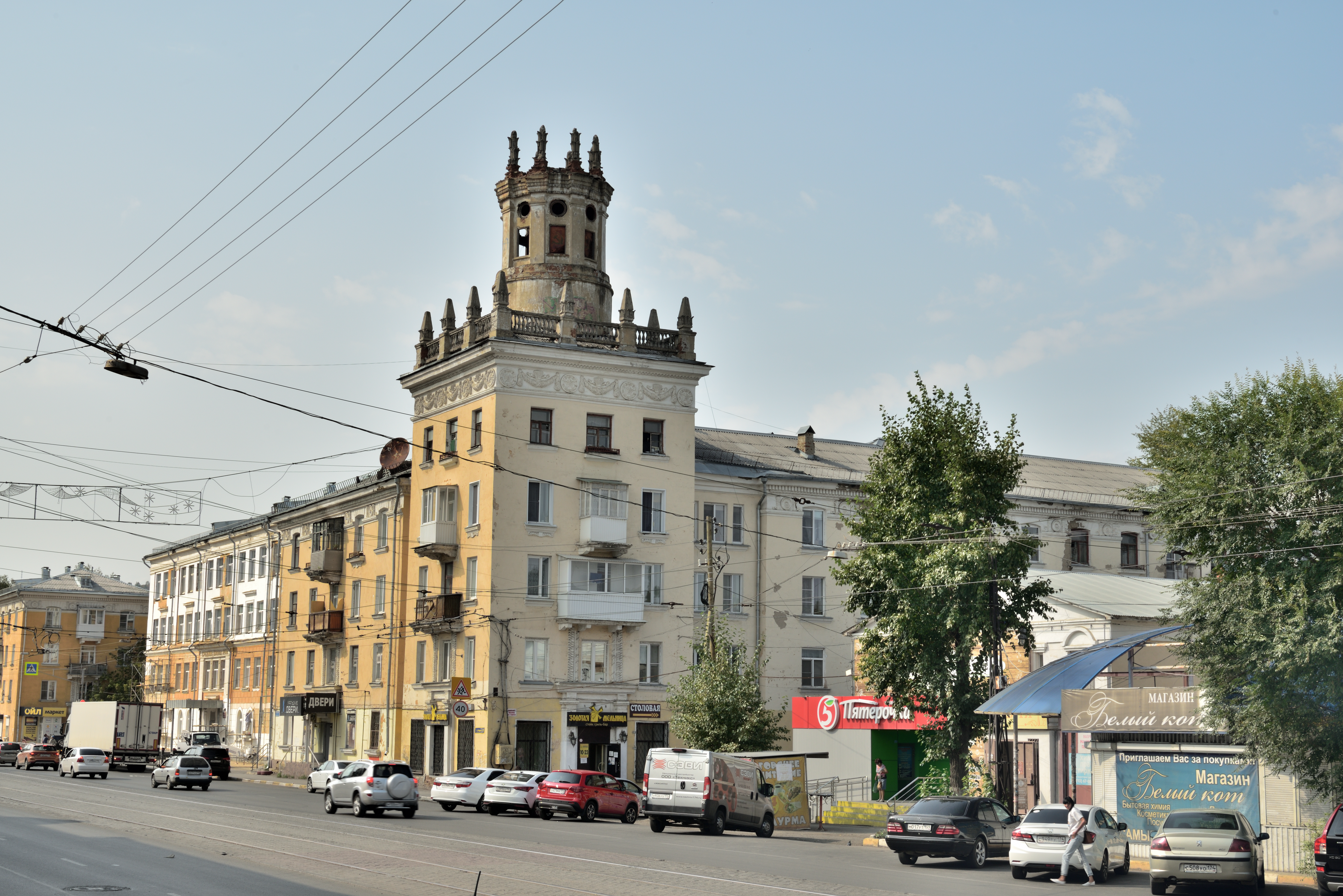
105. Zlatoust

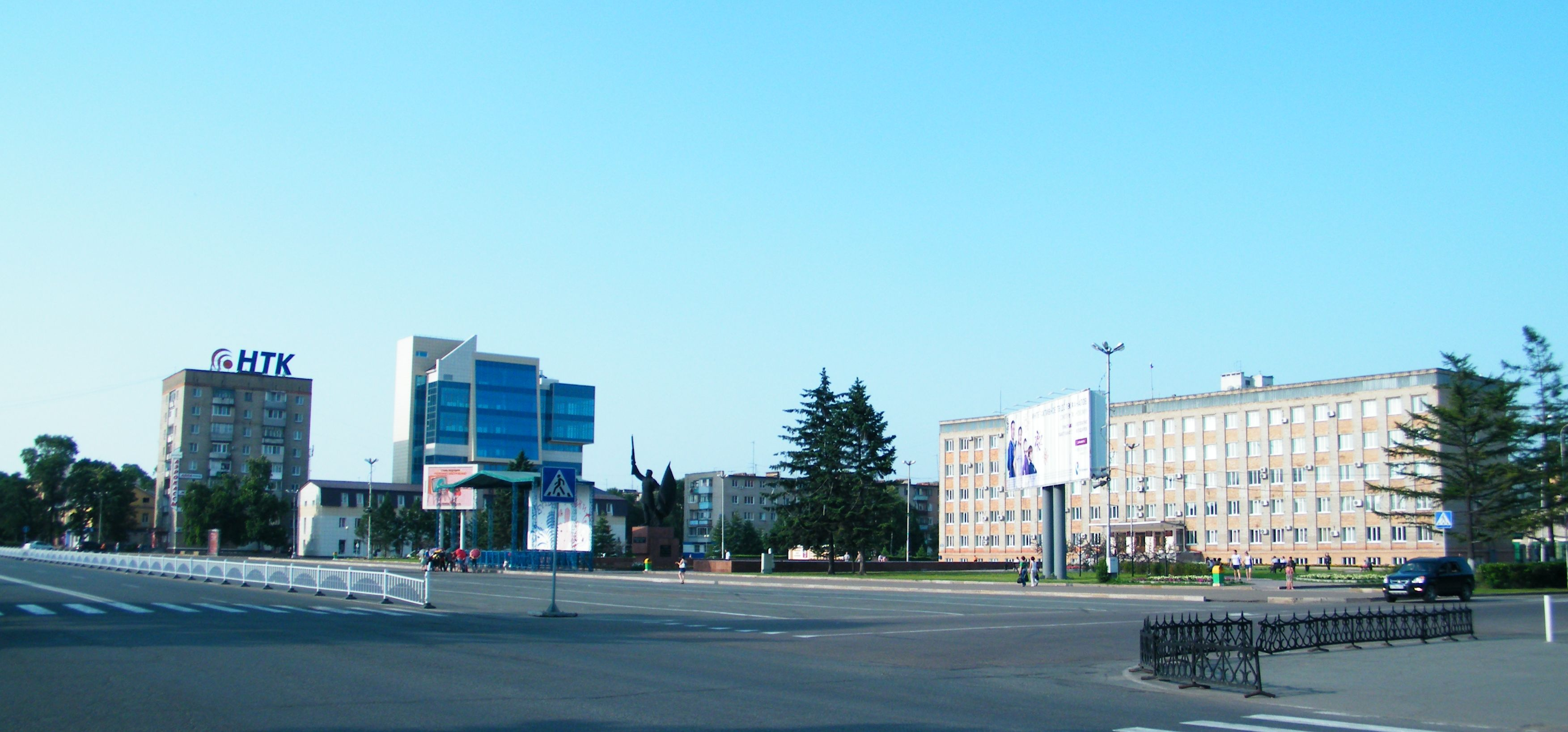
106. Ussuriysk

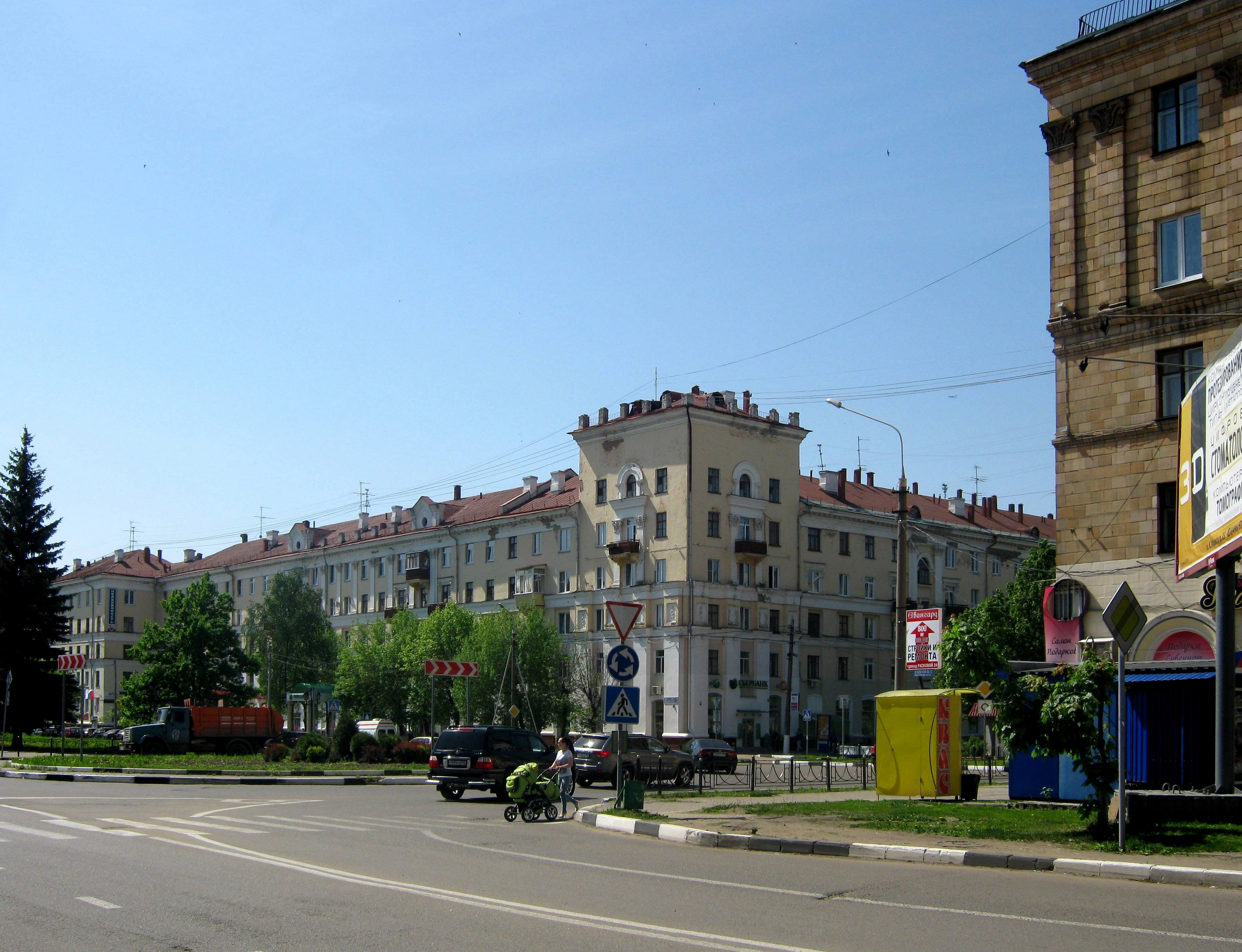
107. Elektrostal

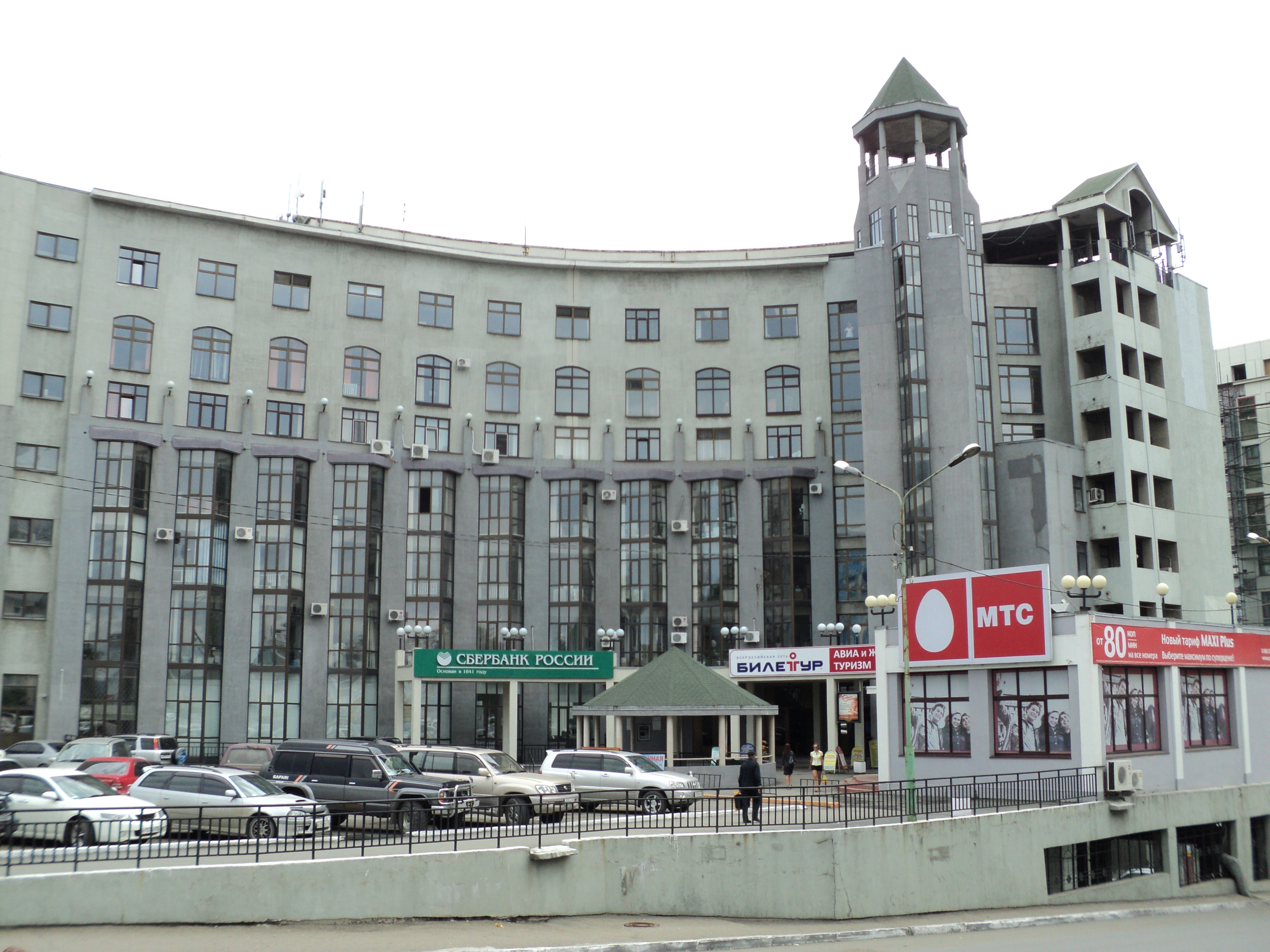
108. Nakhodka

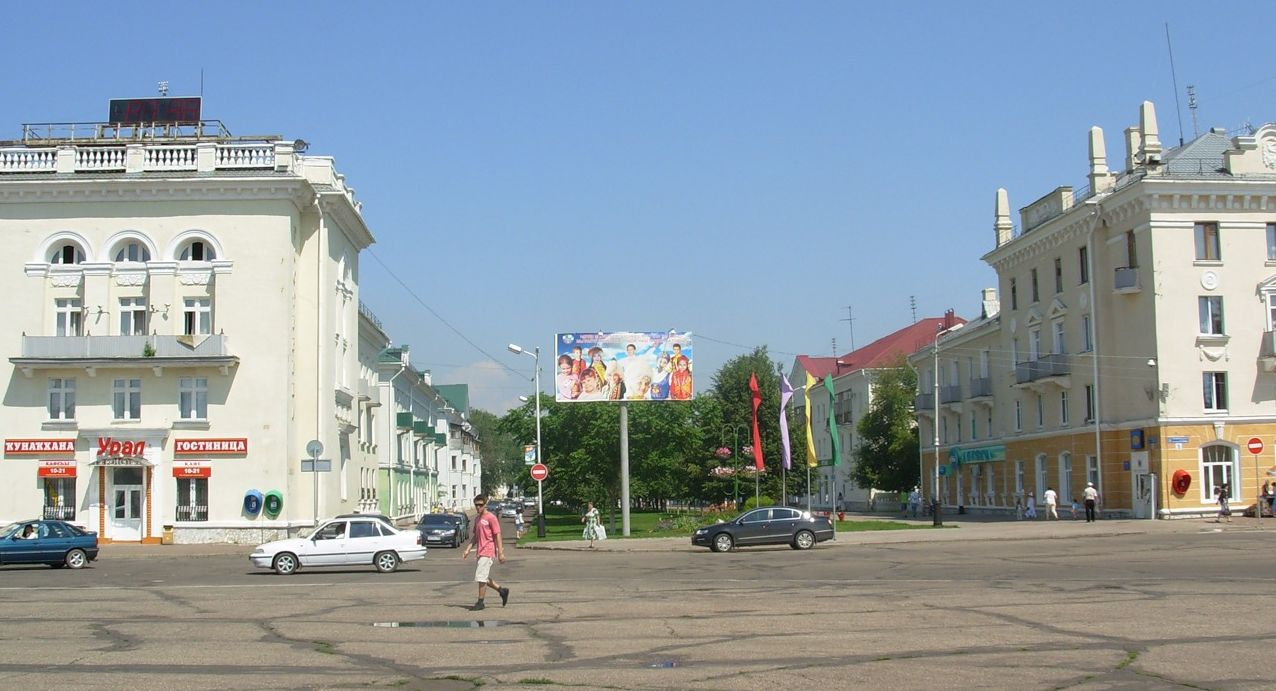
109. Salavat

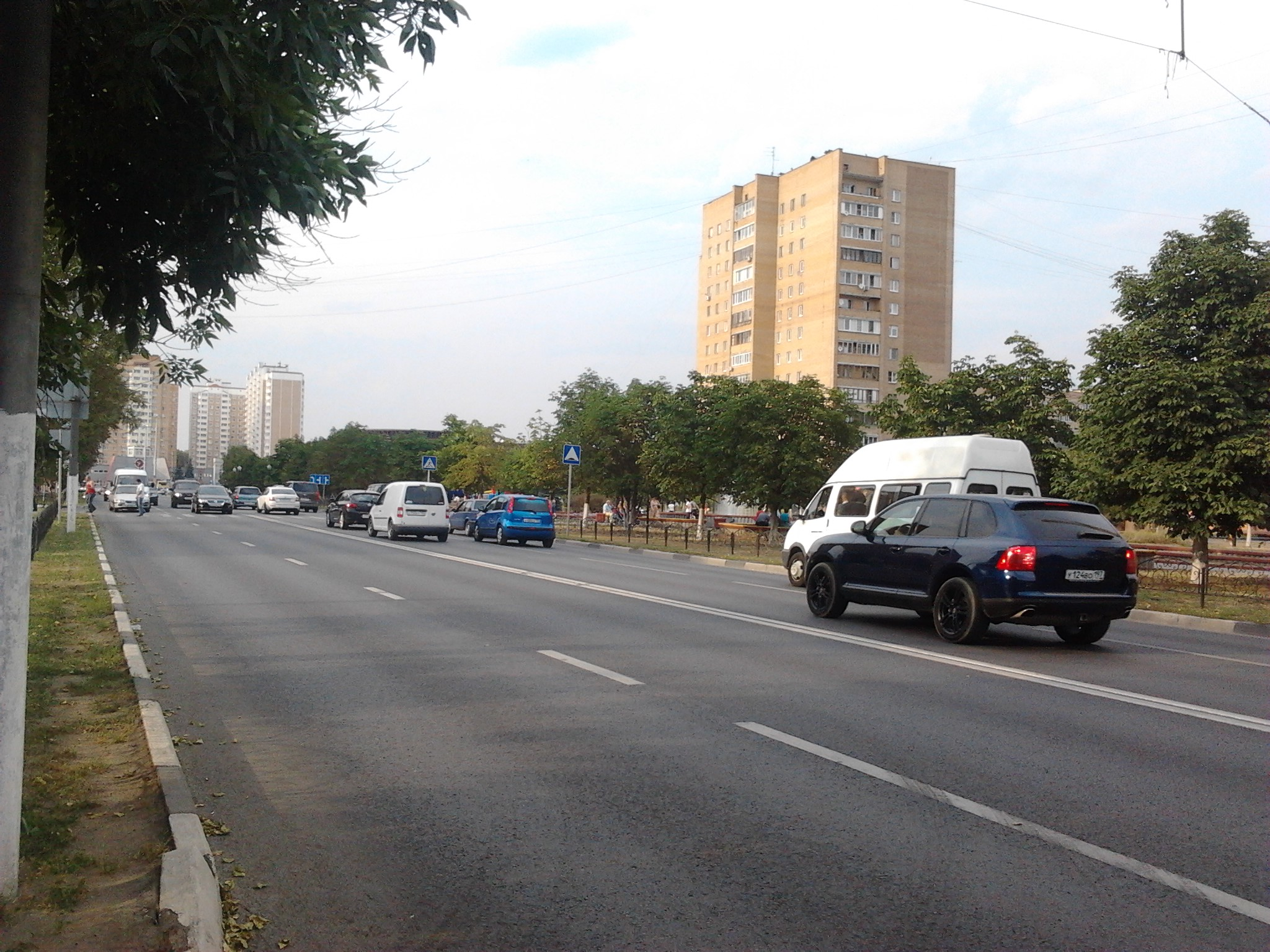
110. Zheleznodorozhny

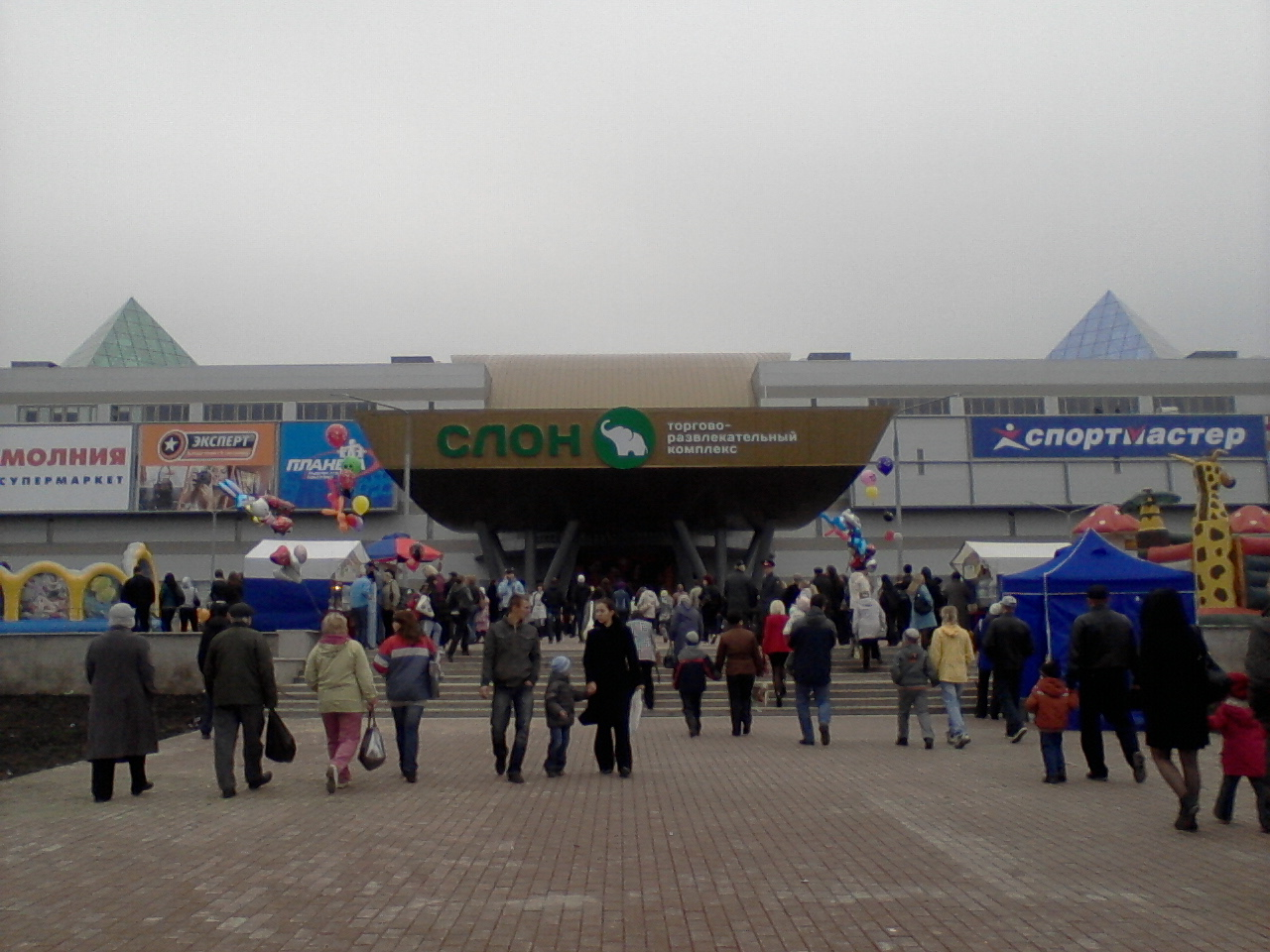
111. Miass

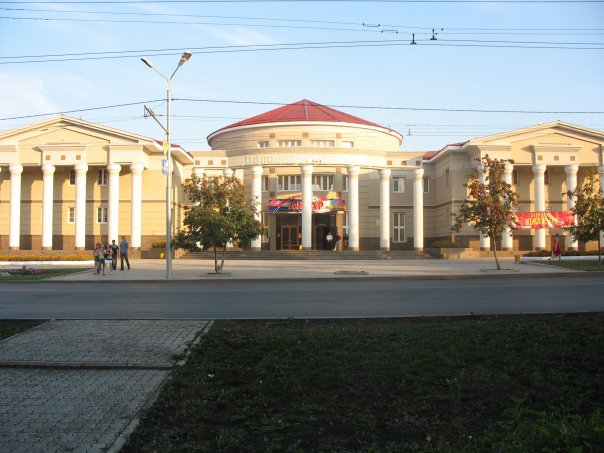
112. Almetyevsk

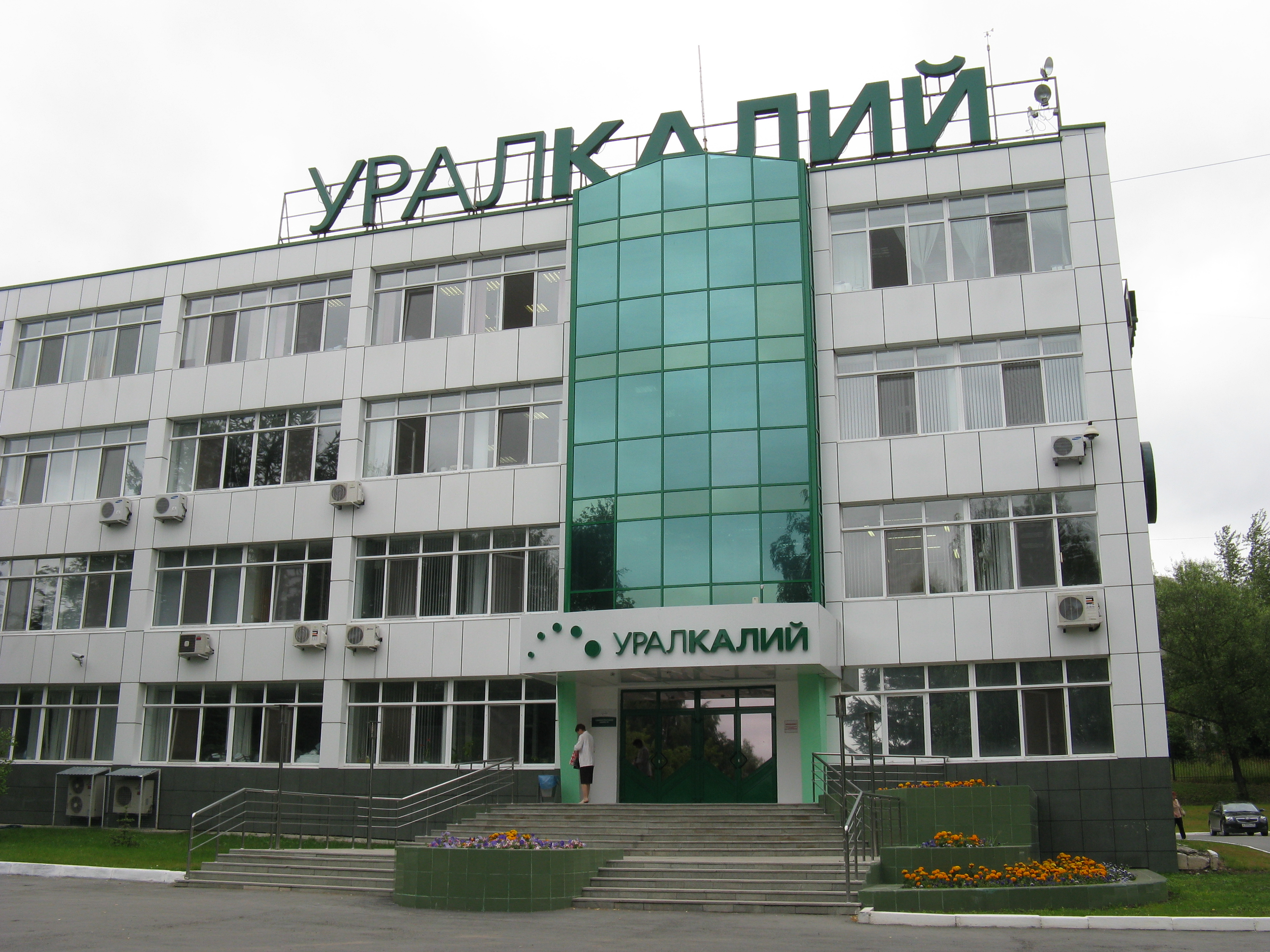
113. Berezniki

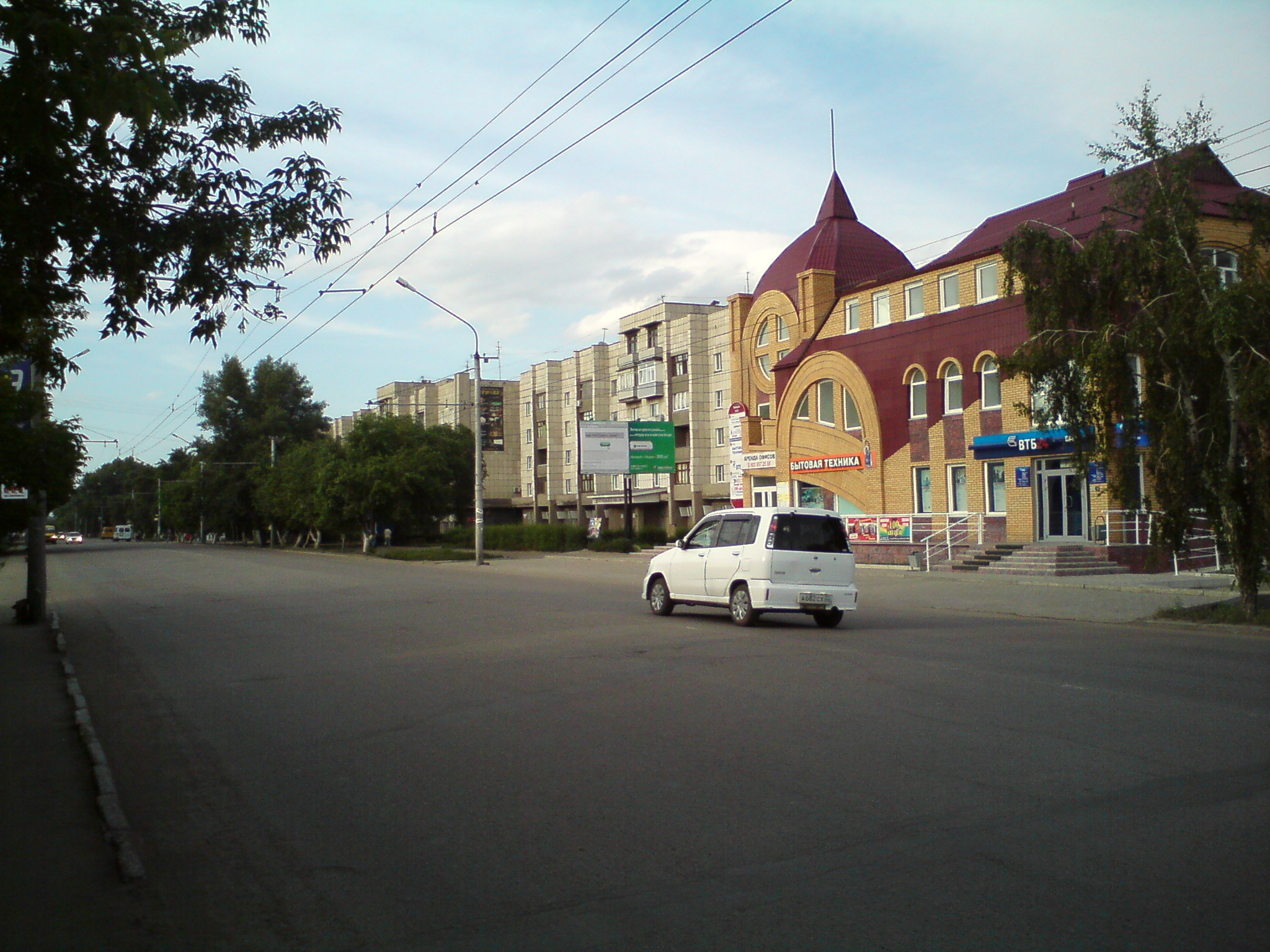
115. Rubtsovsk

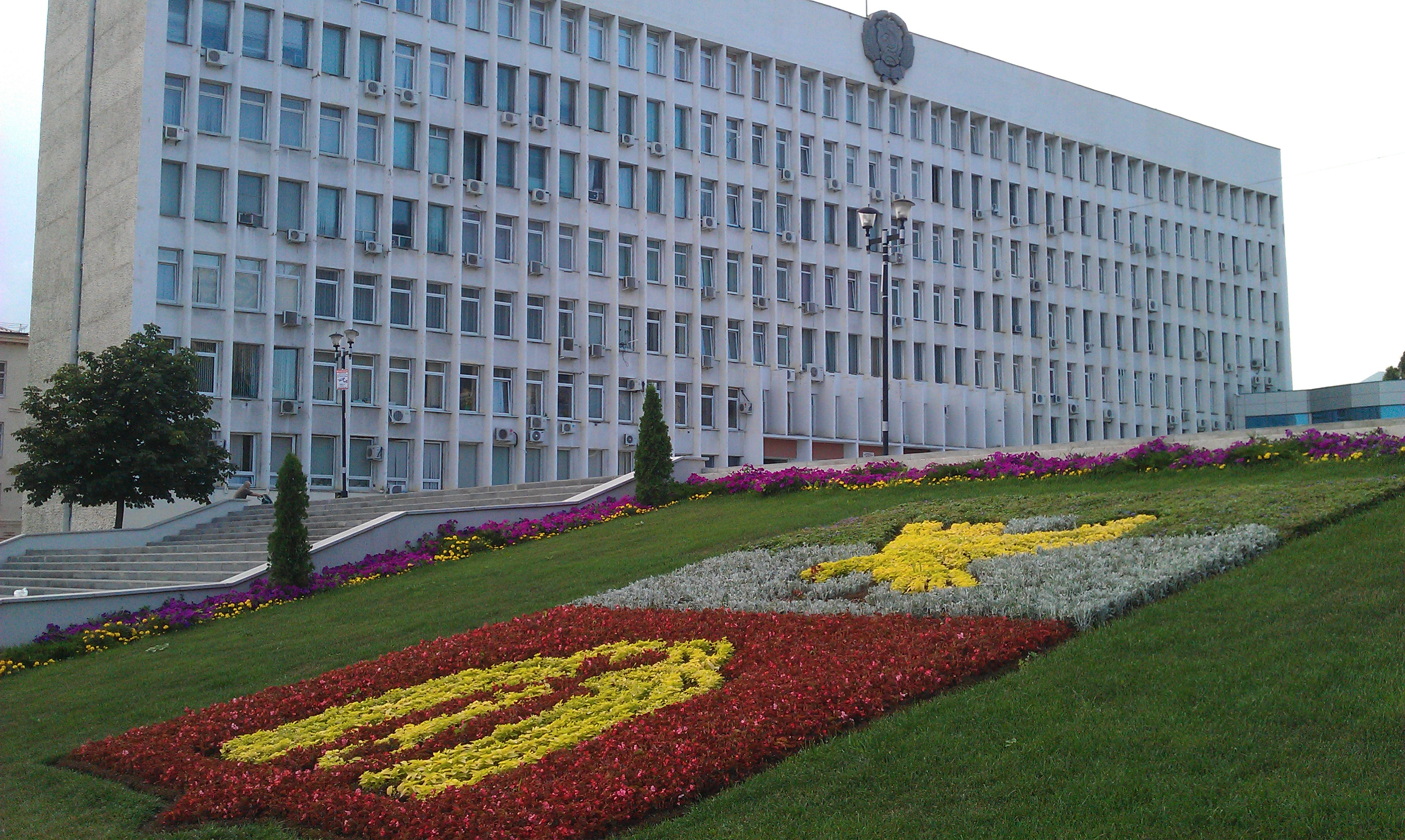
116. Pyatigorsk

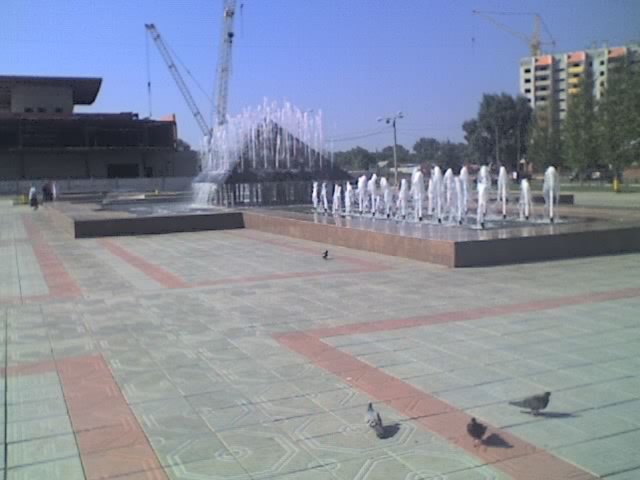
117. Kopeysk

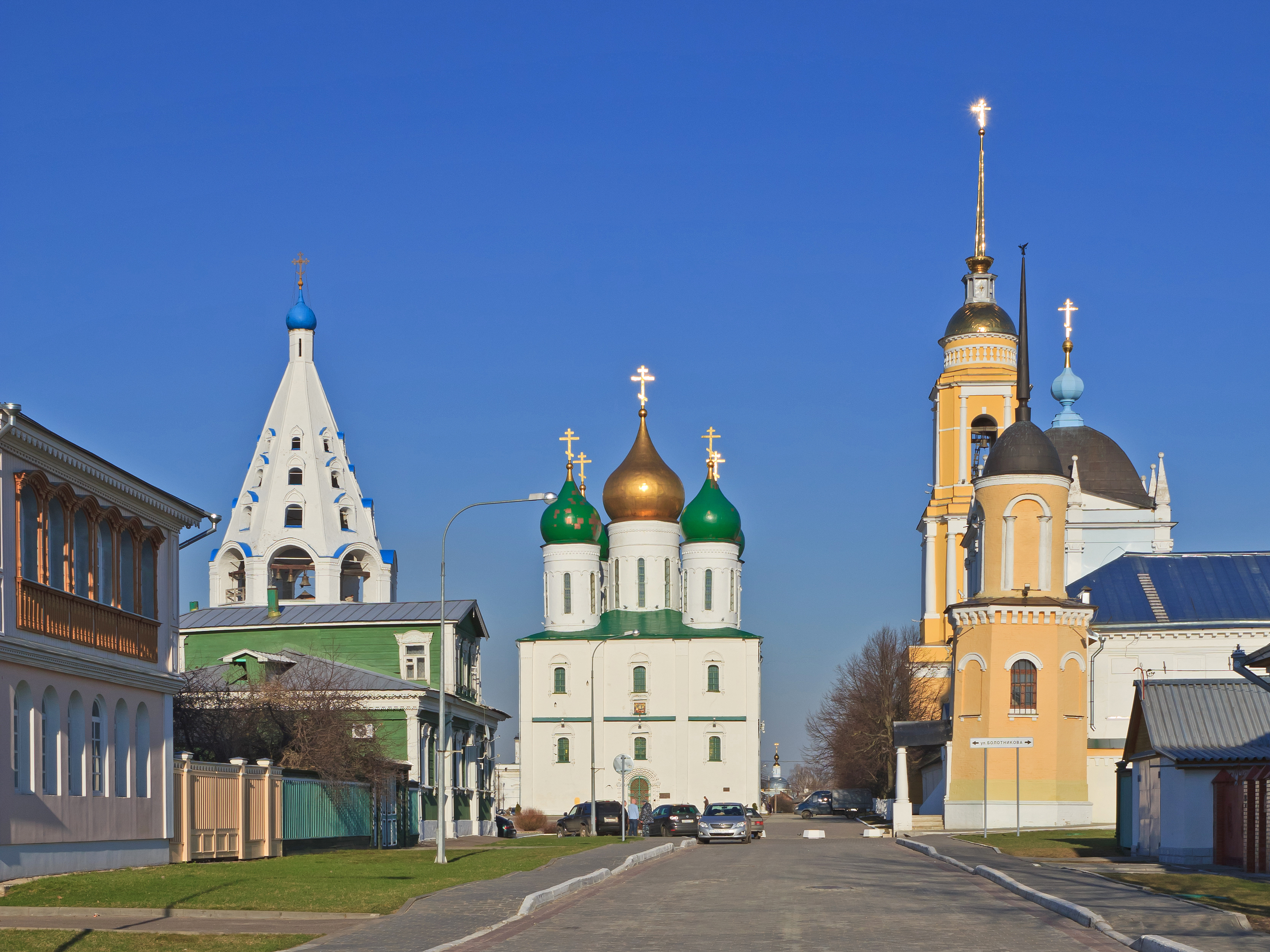
118. Kolomna

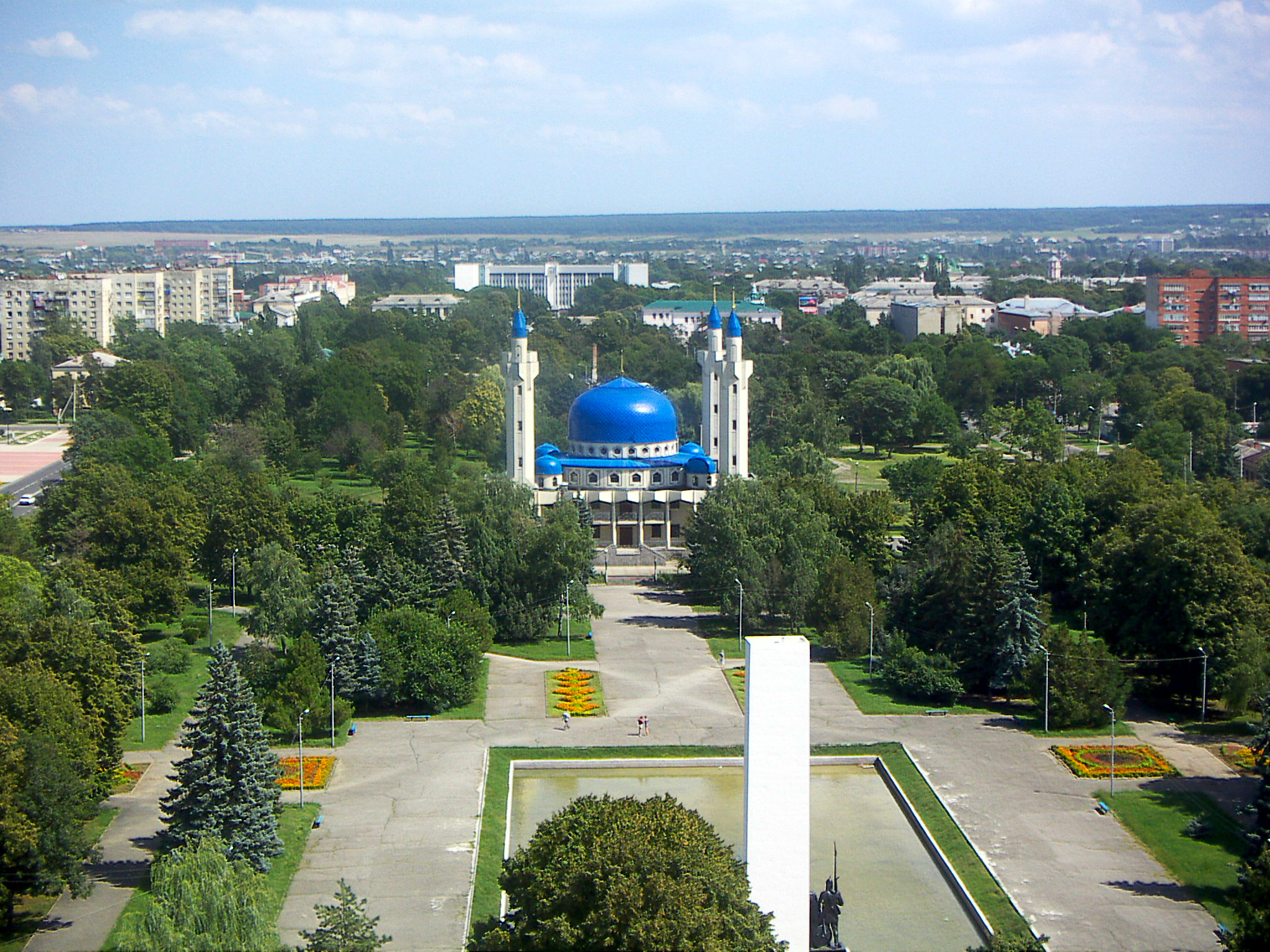
119. Maykop

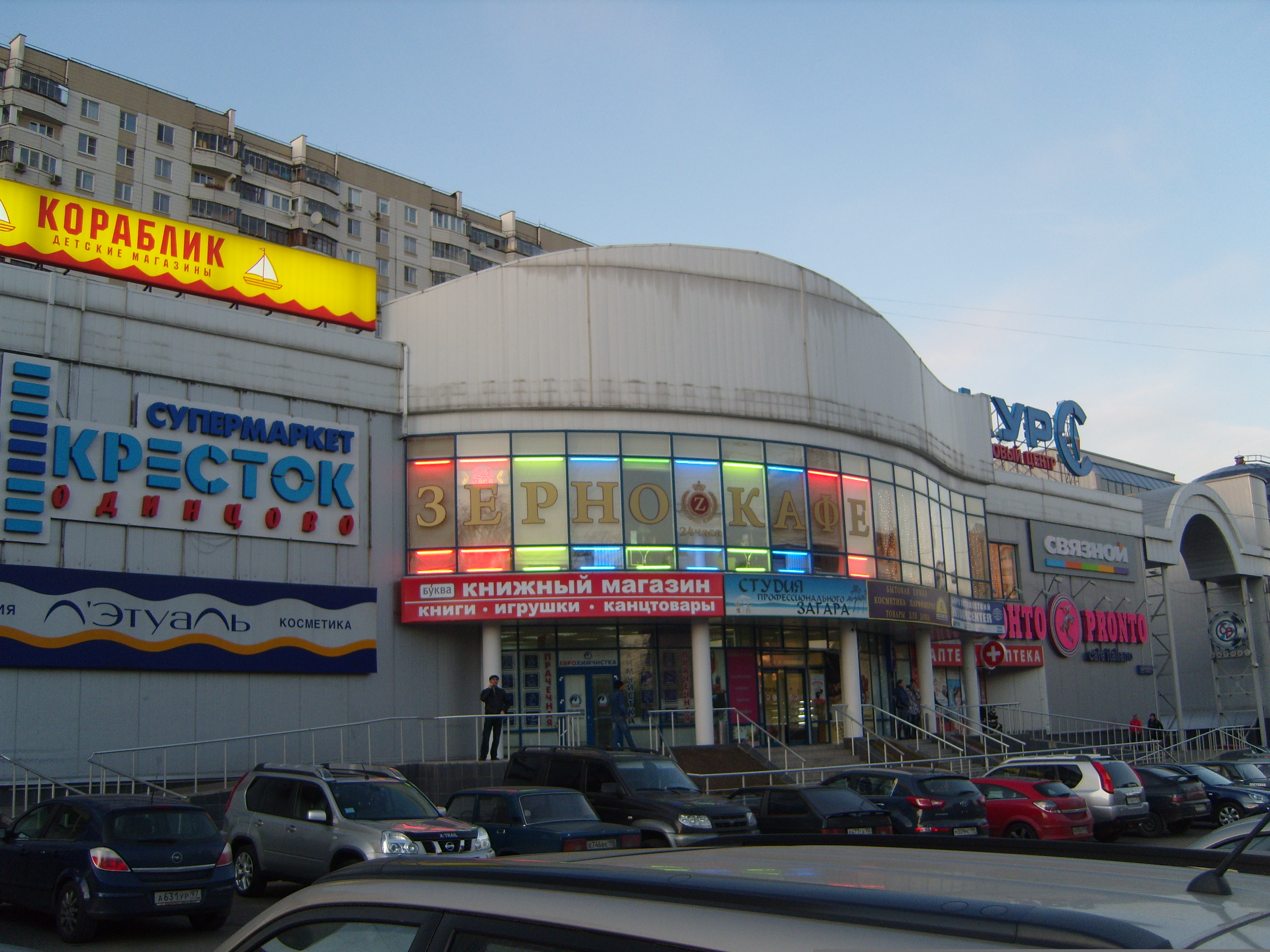
120. Odintsovo

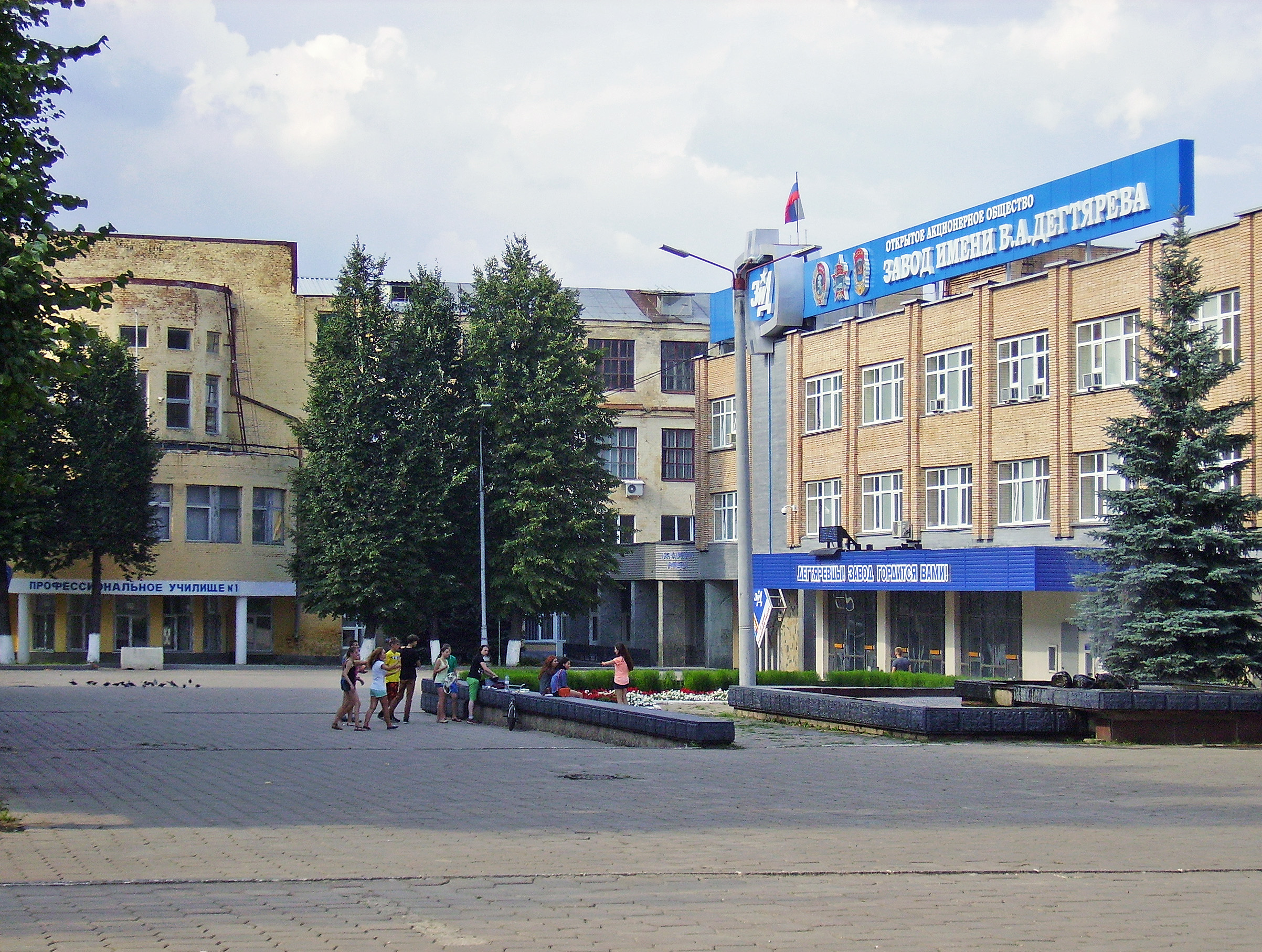
121. Kovrov

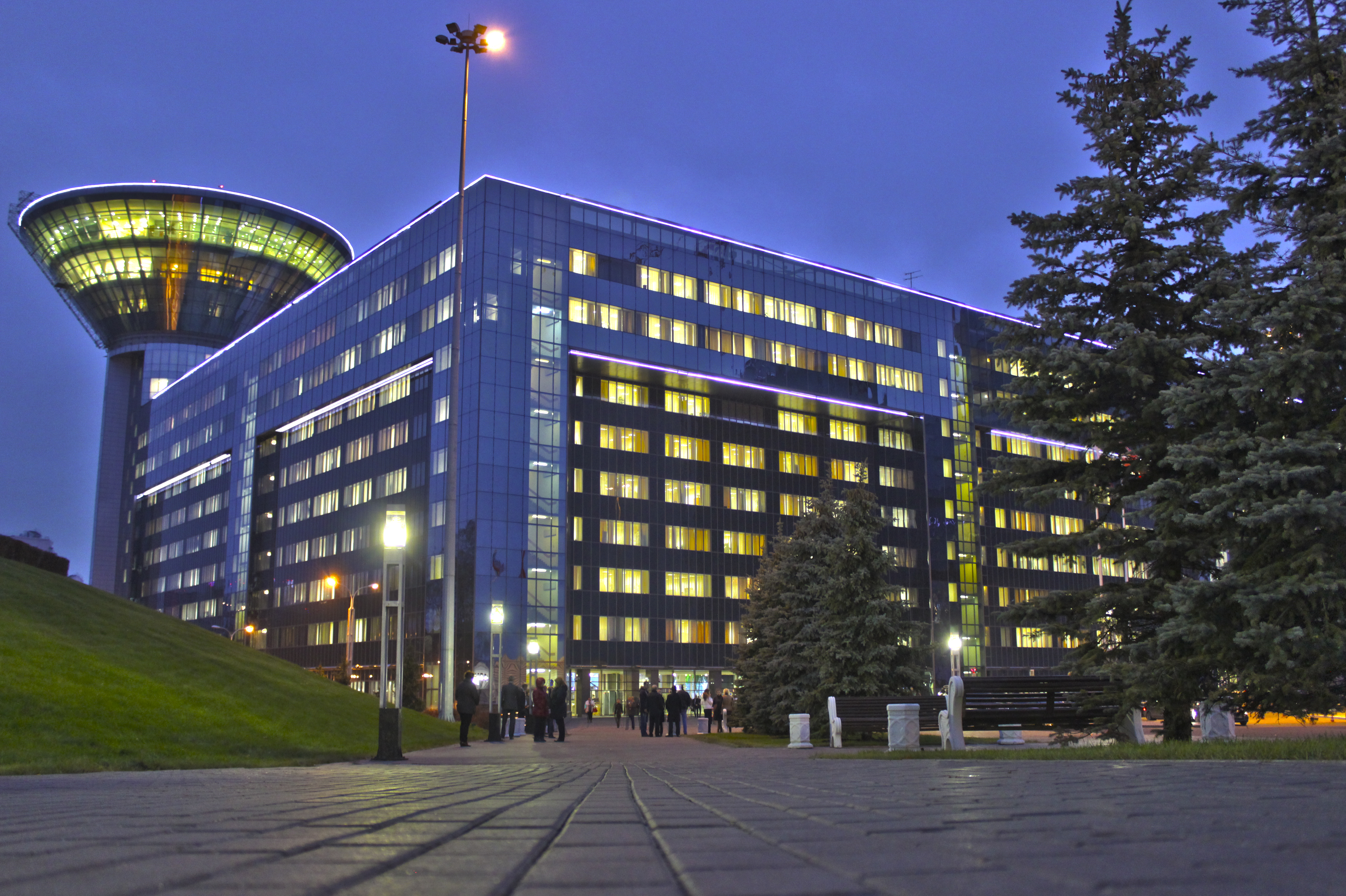
122. Krasnogorsk

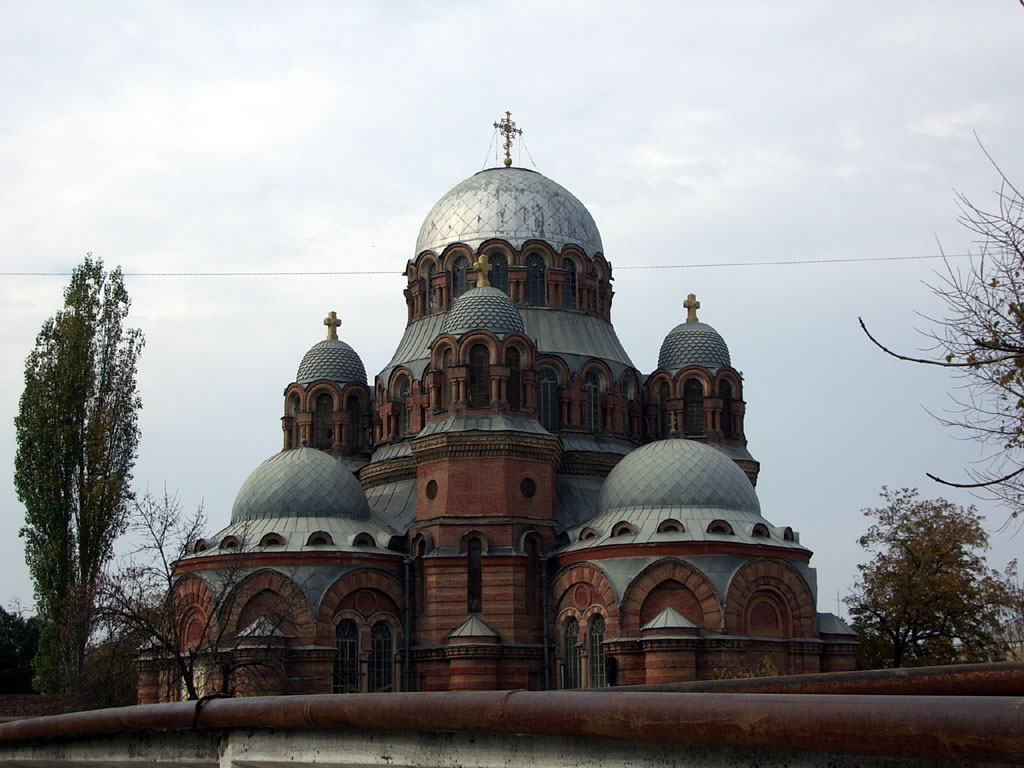
123. Khasavyurt

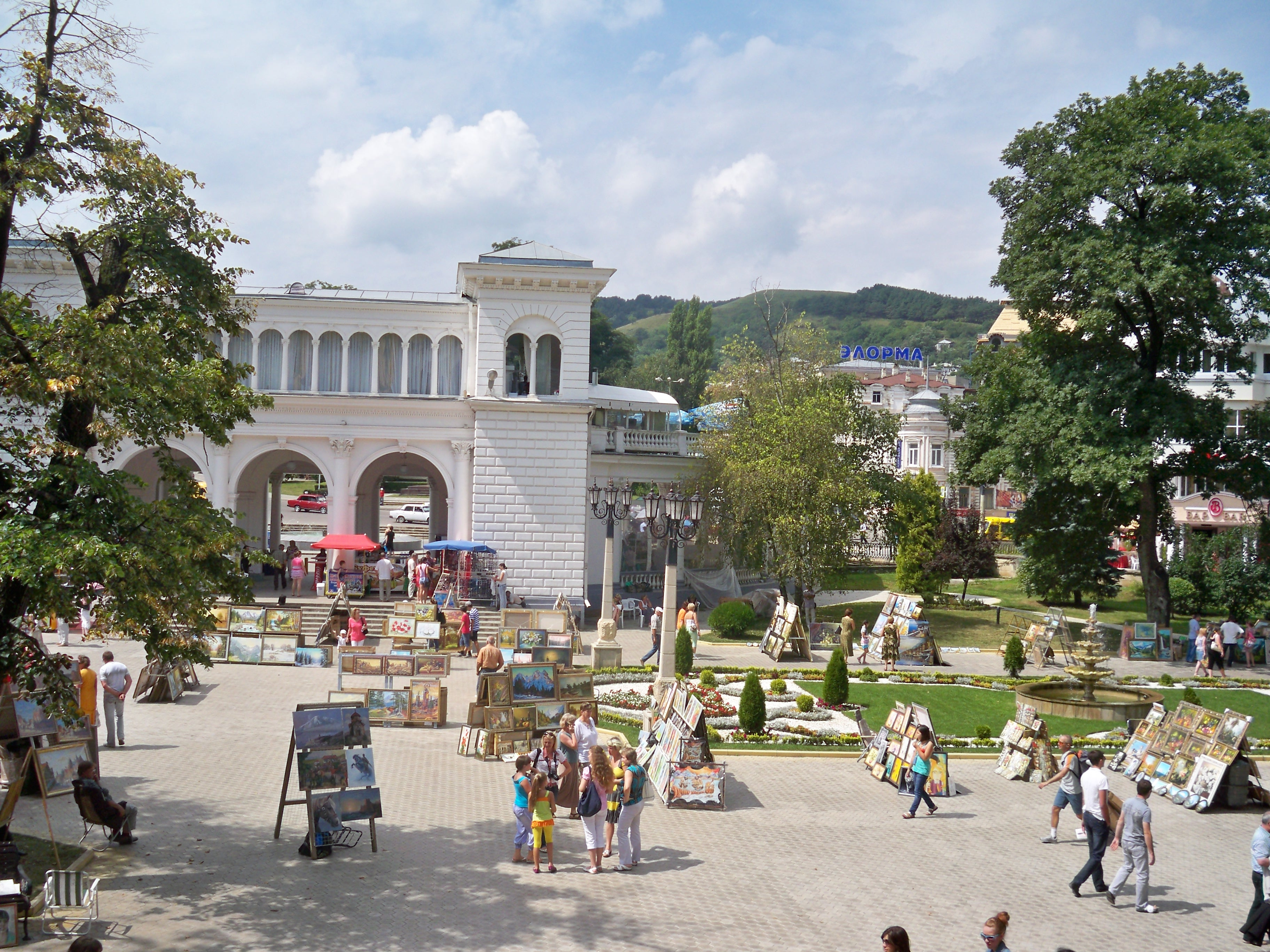
124. Kislovodsk

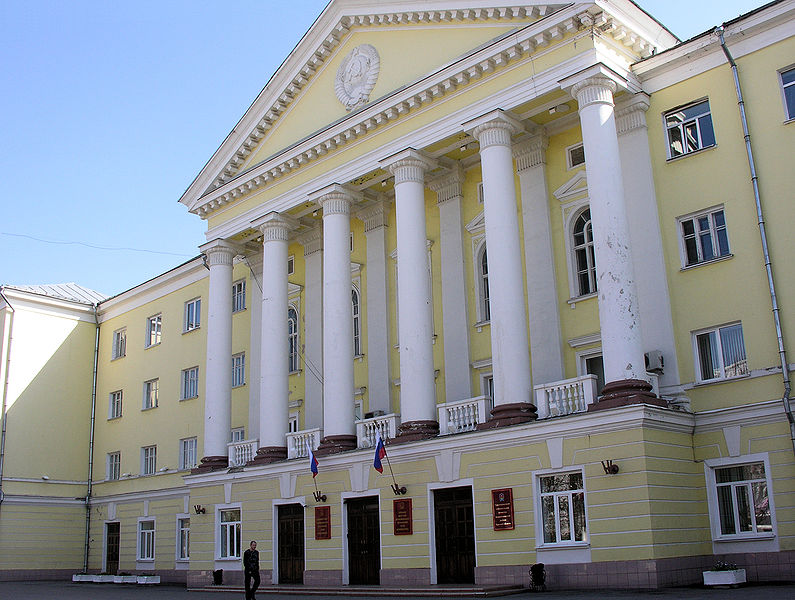
125. Novomoskovsk

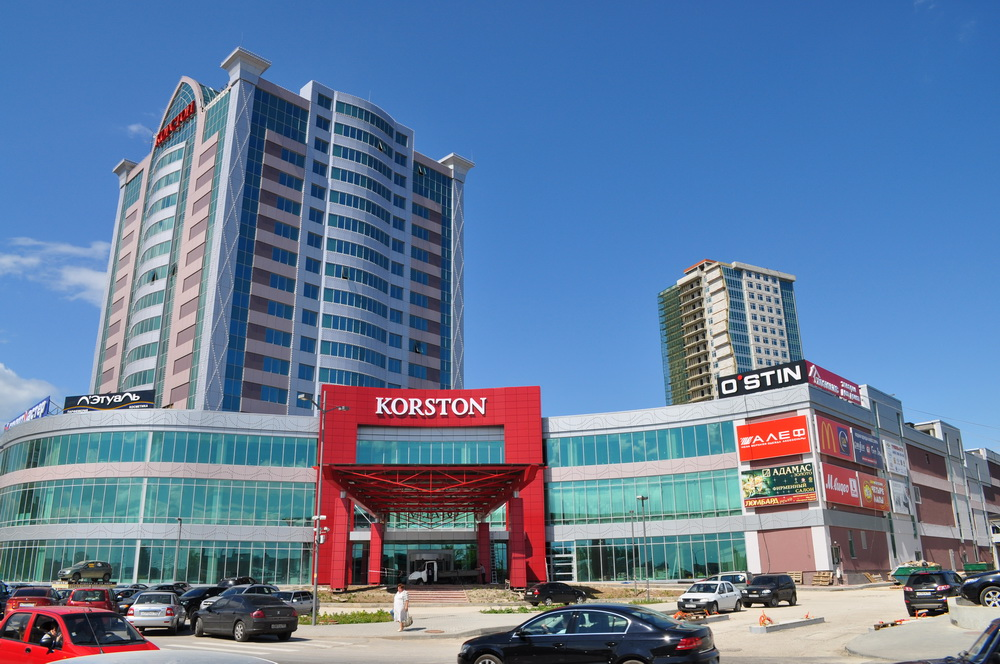
126. Serpukhov

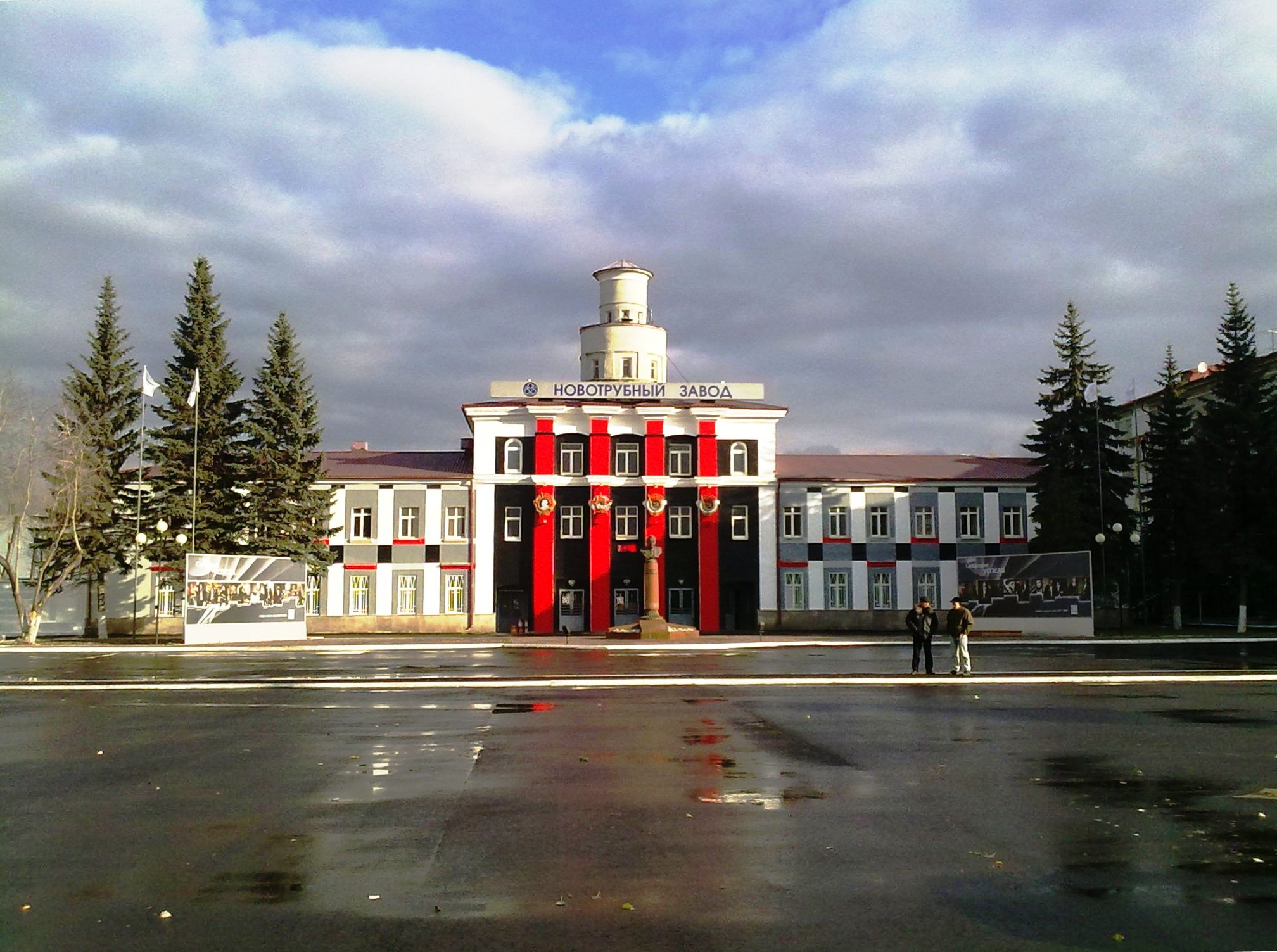
127. Pervouralsk

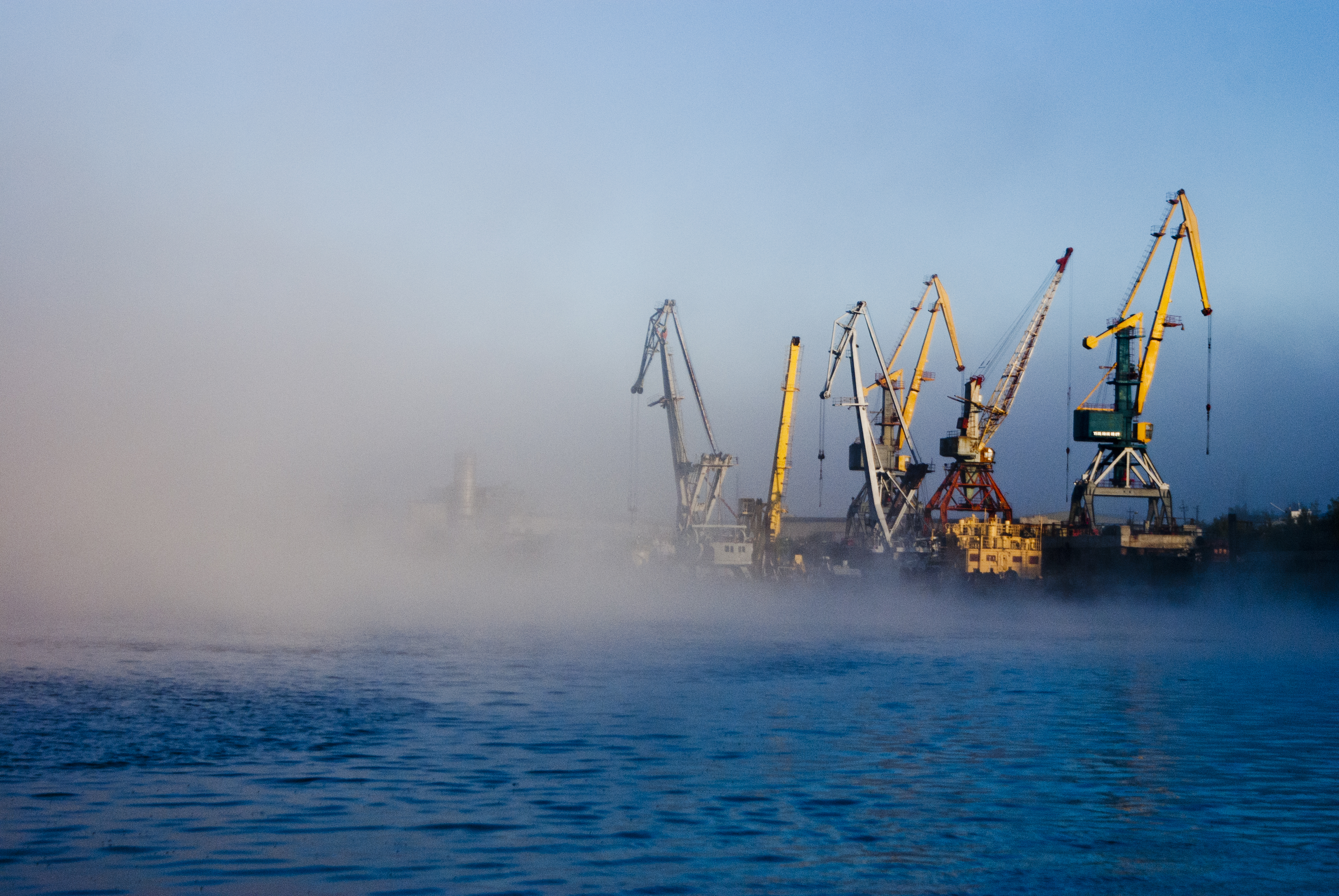
128. Nefteyugansk

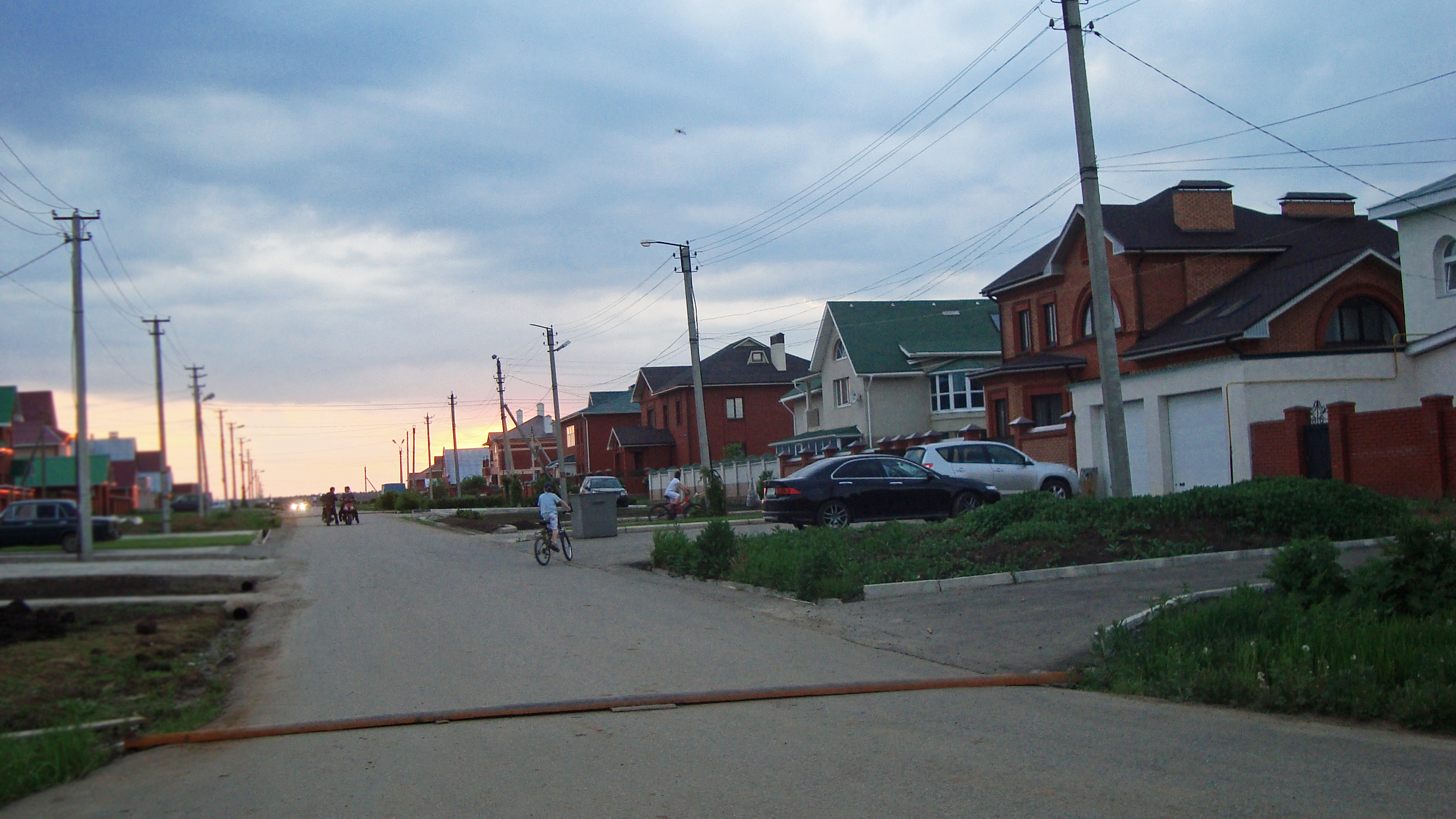
129. Neftekamsk

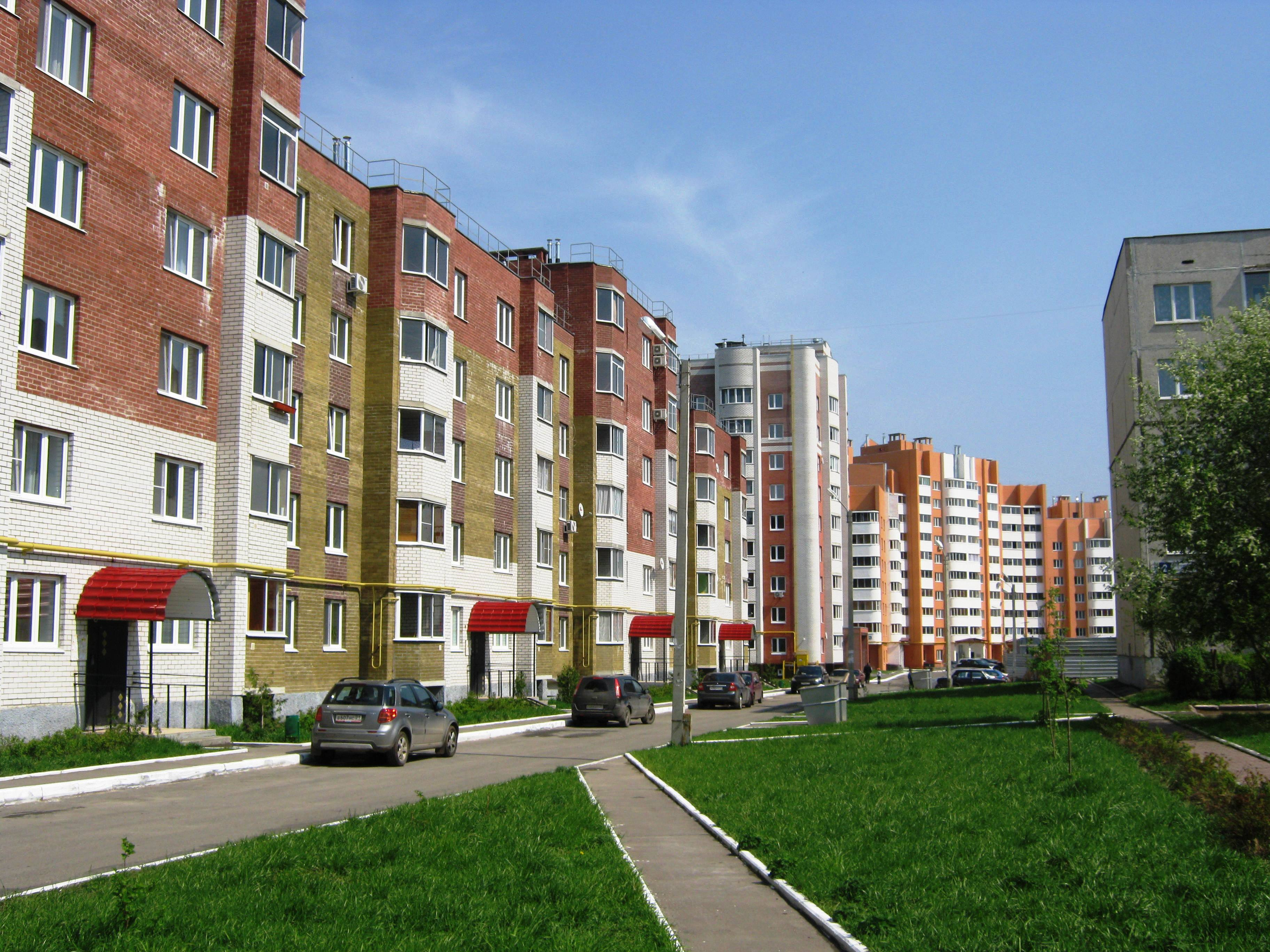
130. Novocheboksarsk

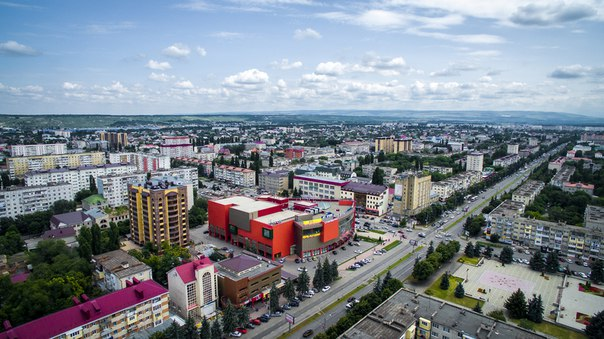
131. Cherkessk

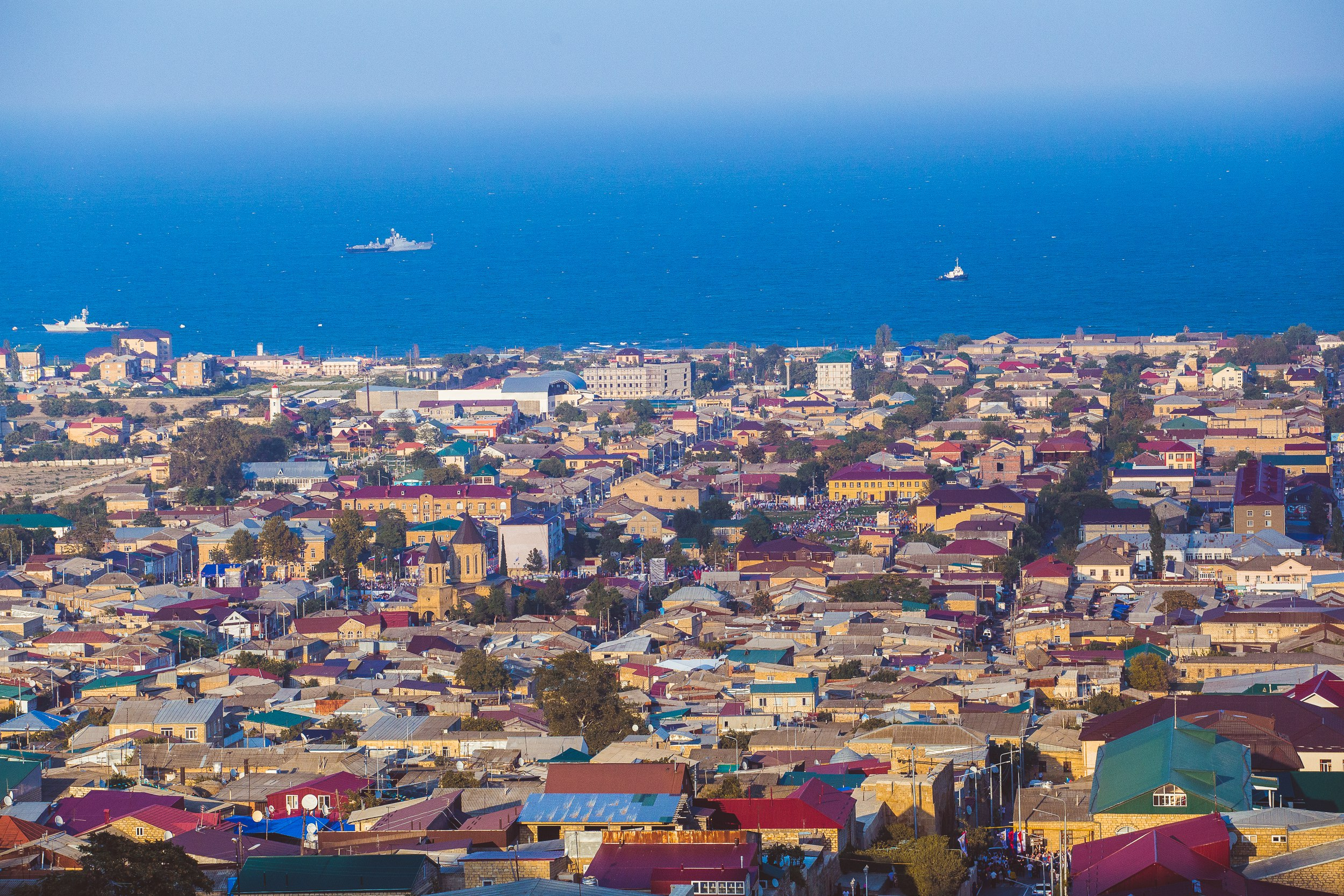
132. Derbent

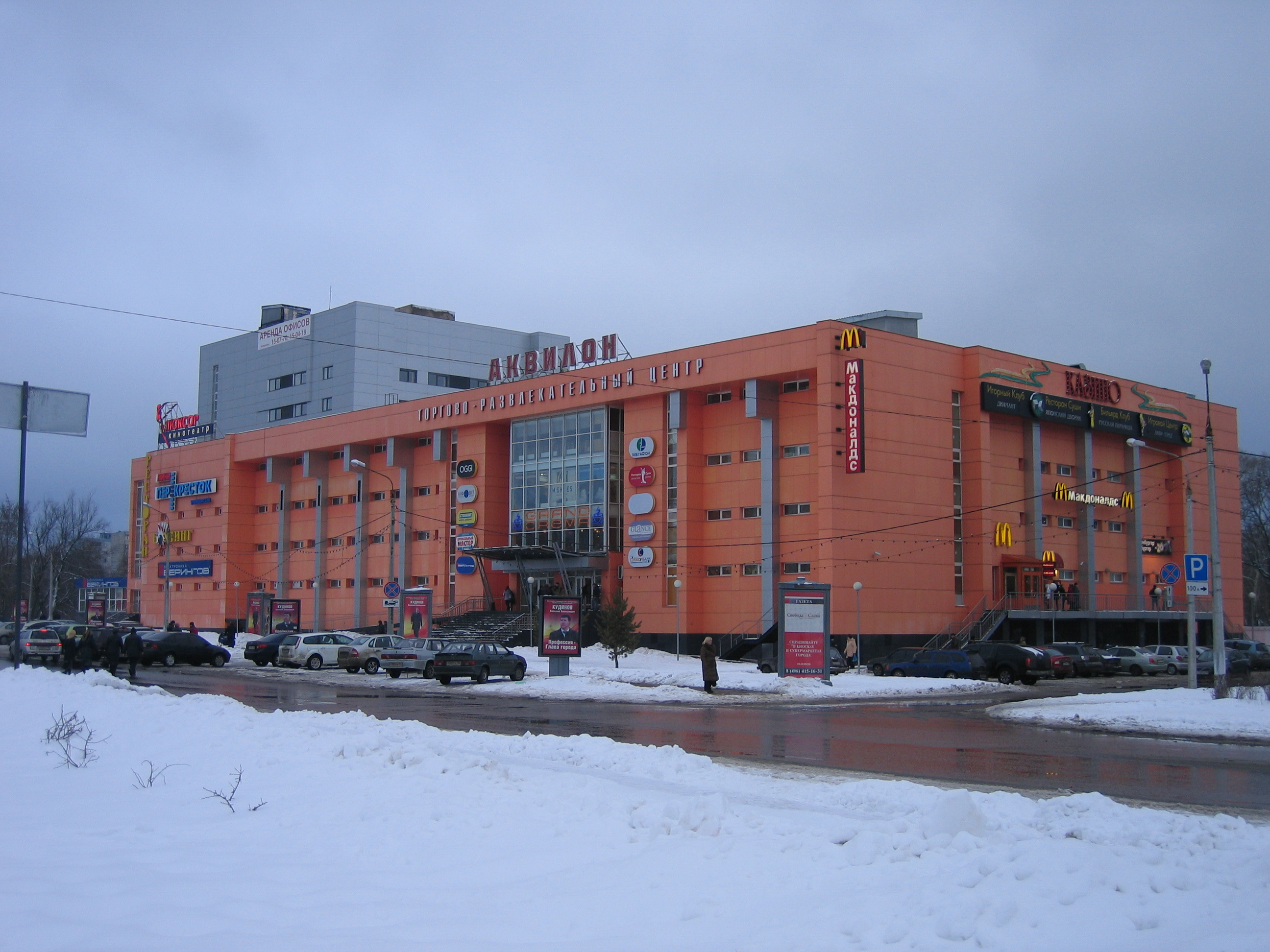
133. Orekhovo-Zuyevo

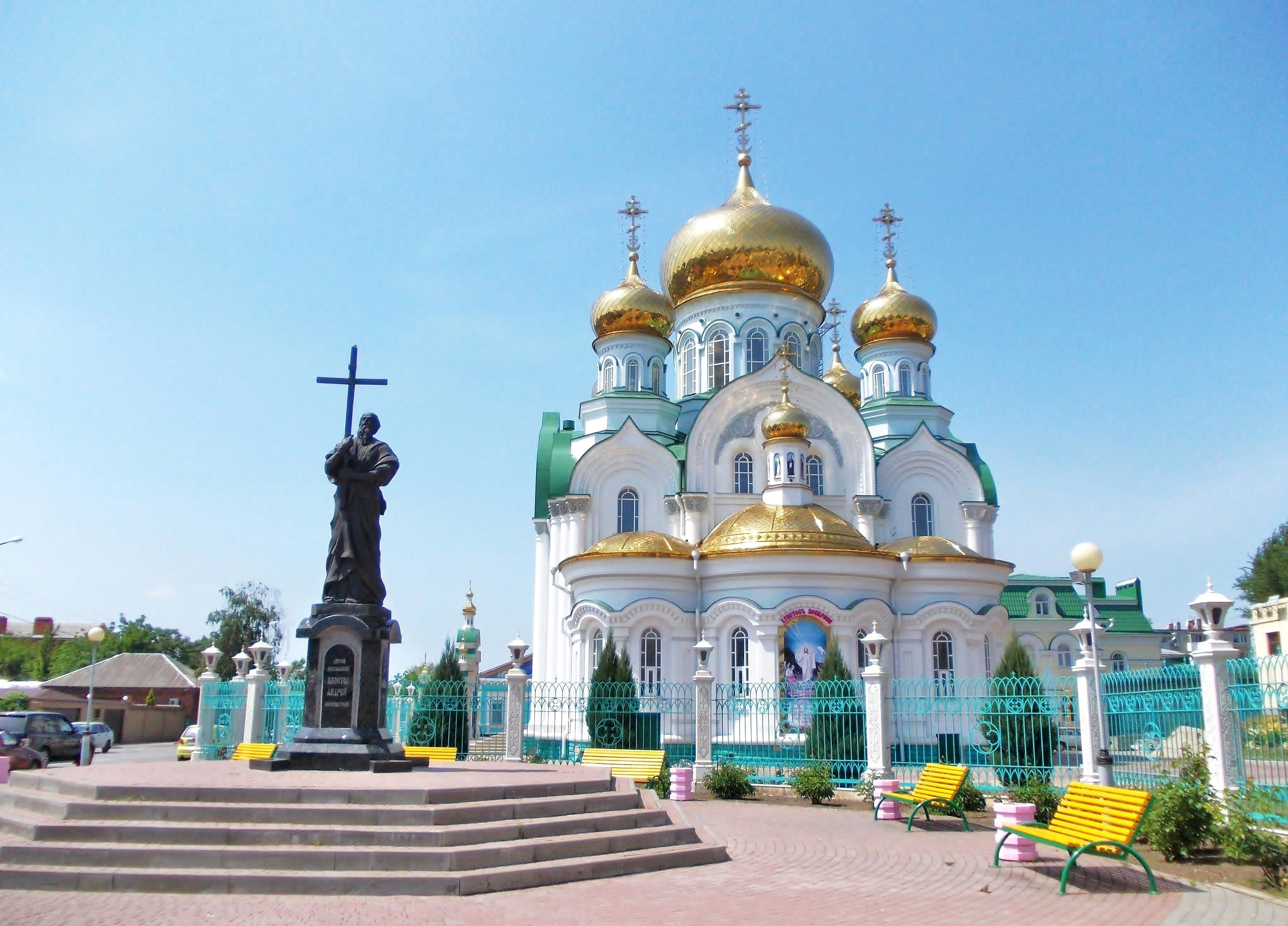
134. Bataysk

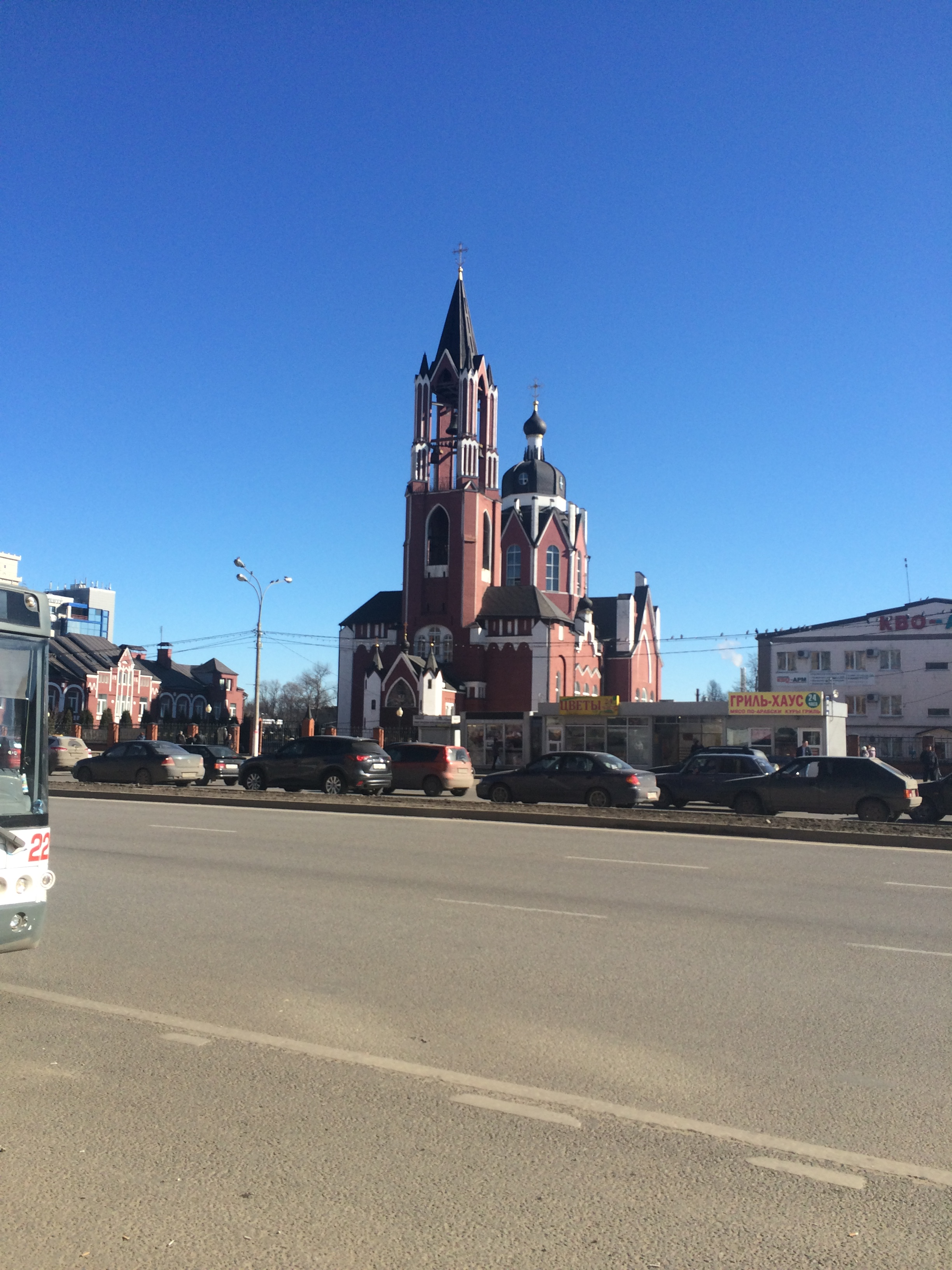
135. Shchyolkovo

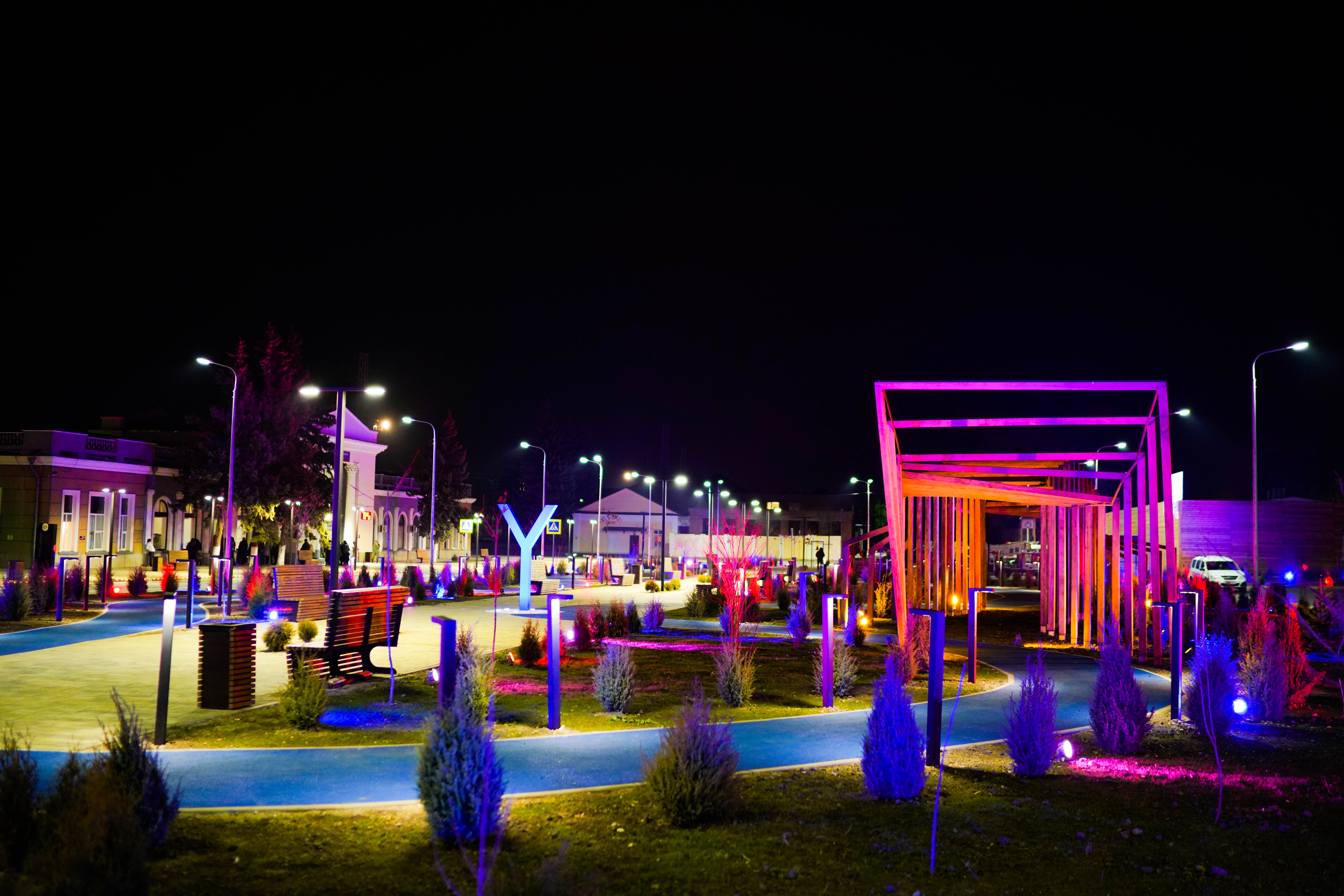
136. Nevinnomyssk

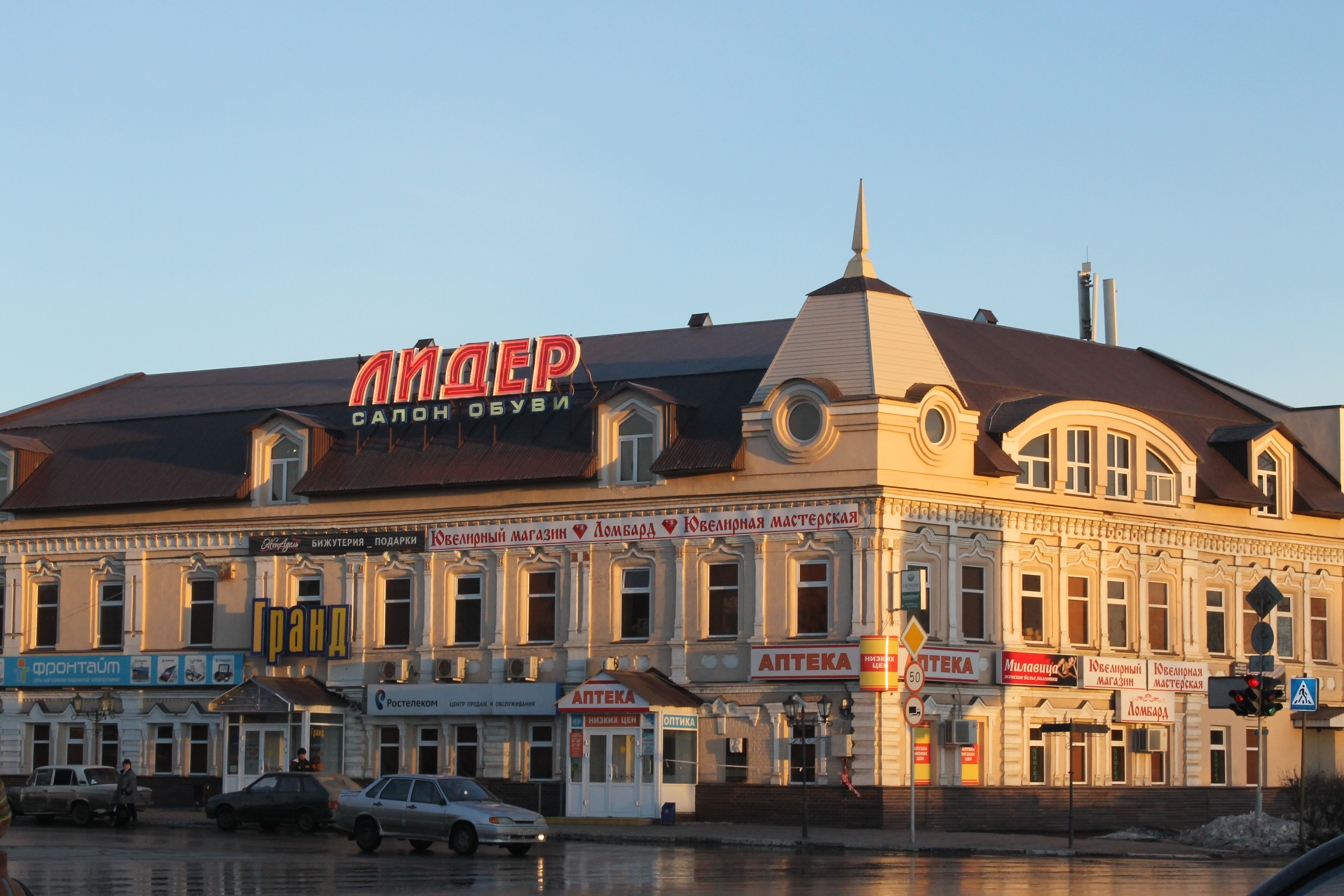
137. Dimitrovgrad

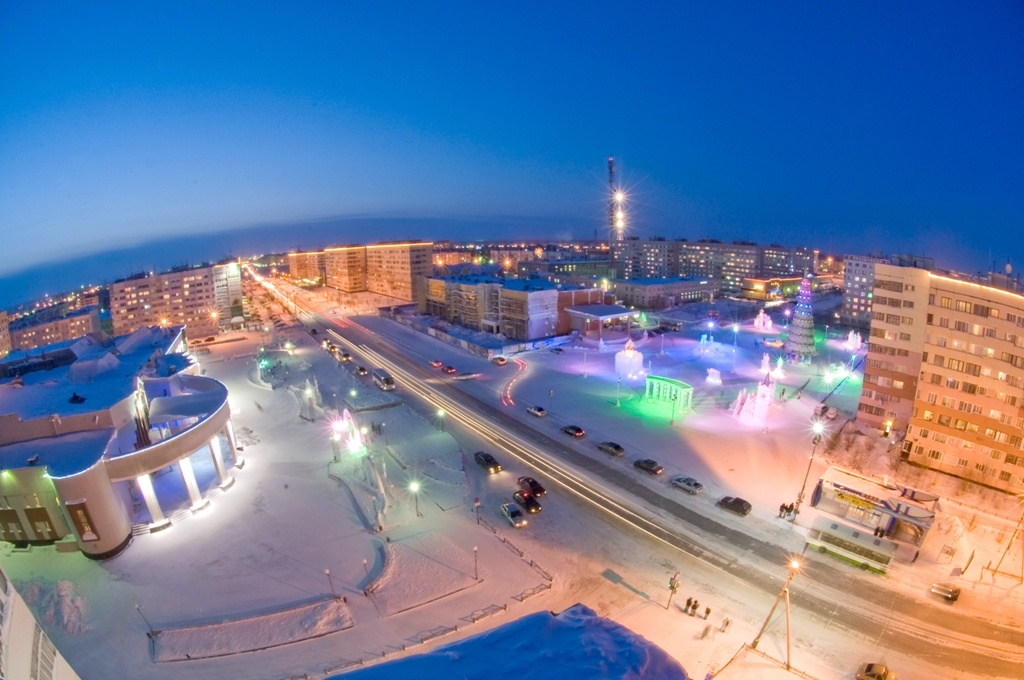
138. Novy Urengoy

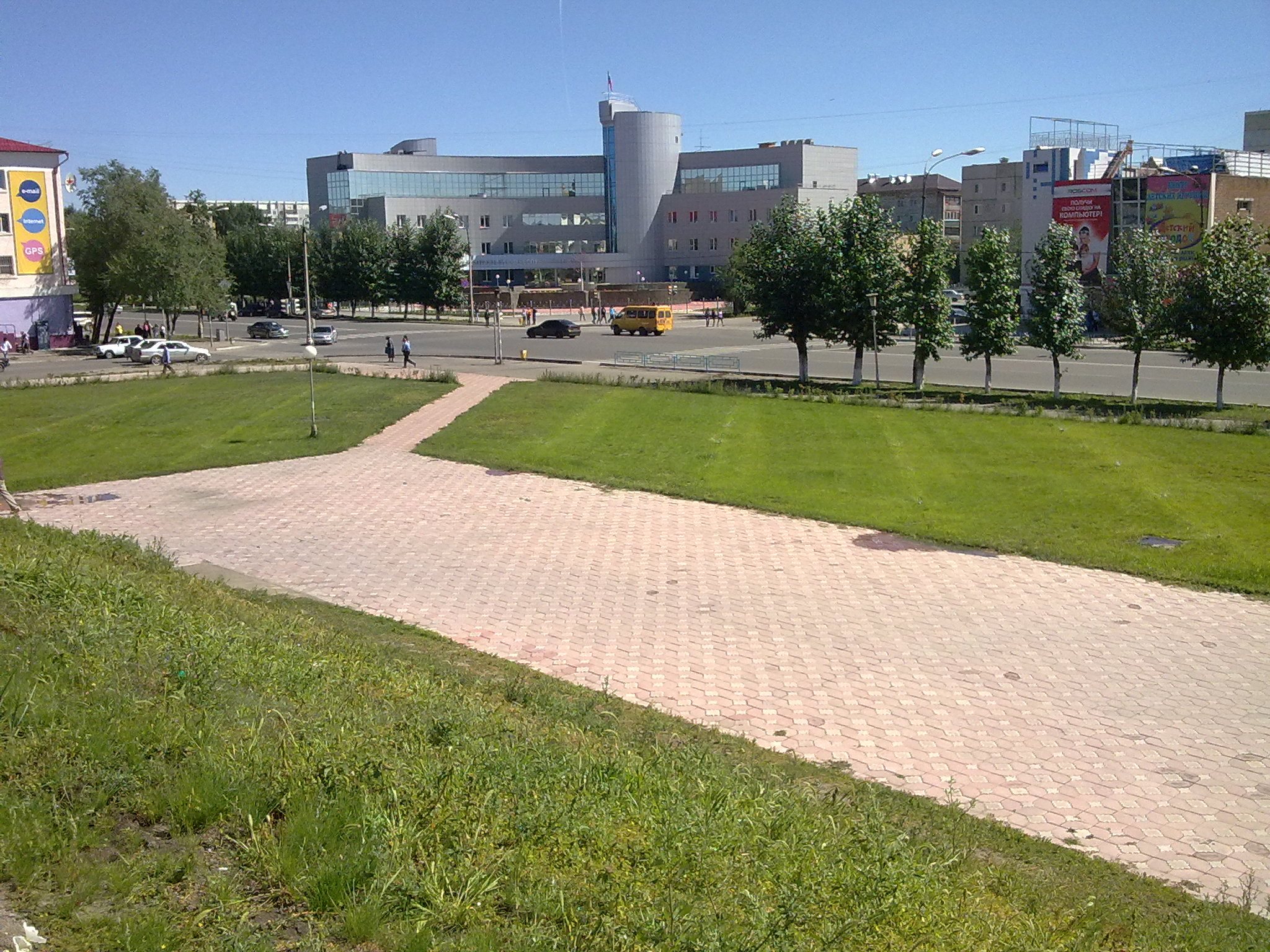
139. Kyzyl

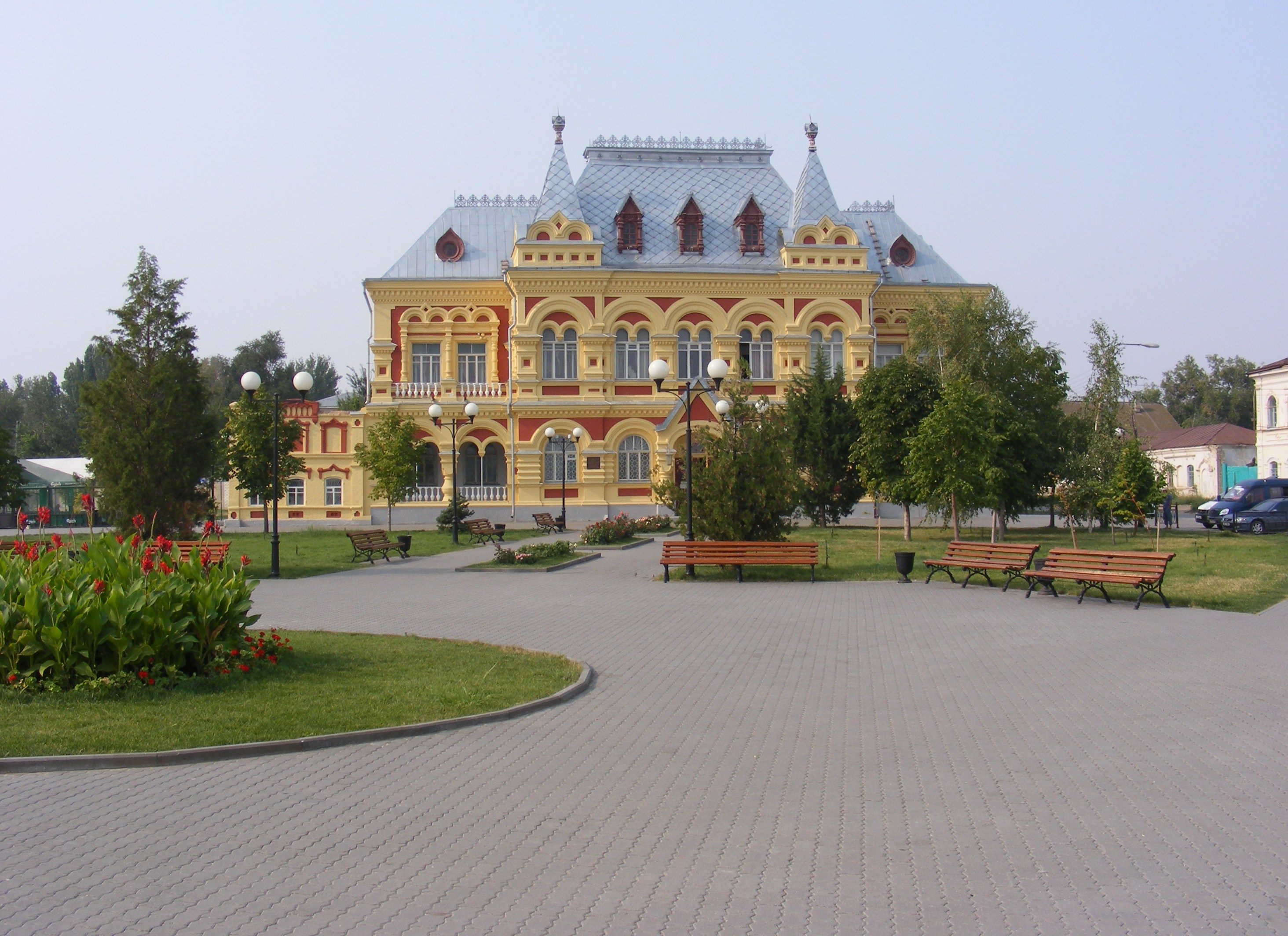
140. Kamyshin

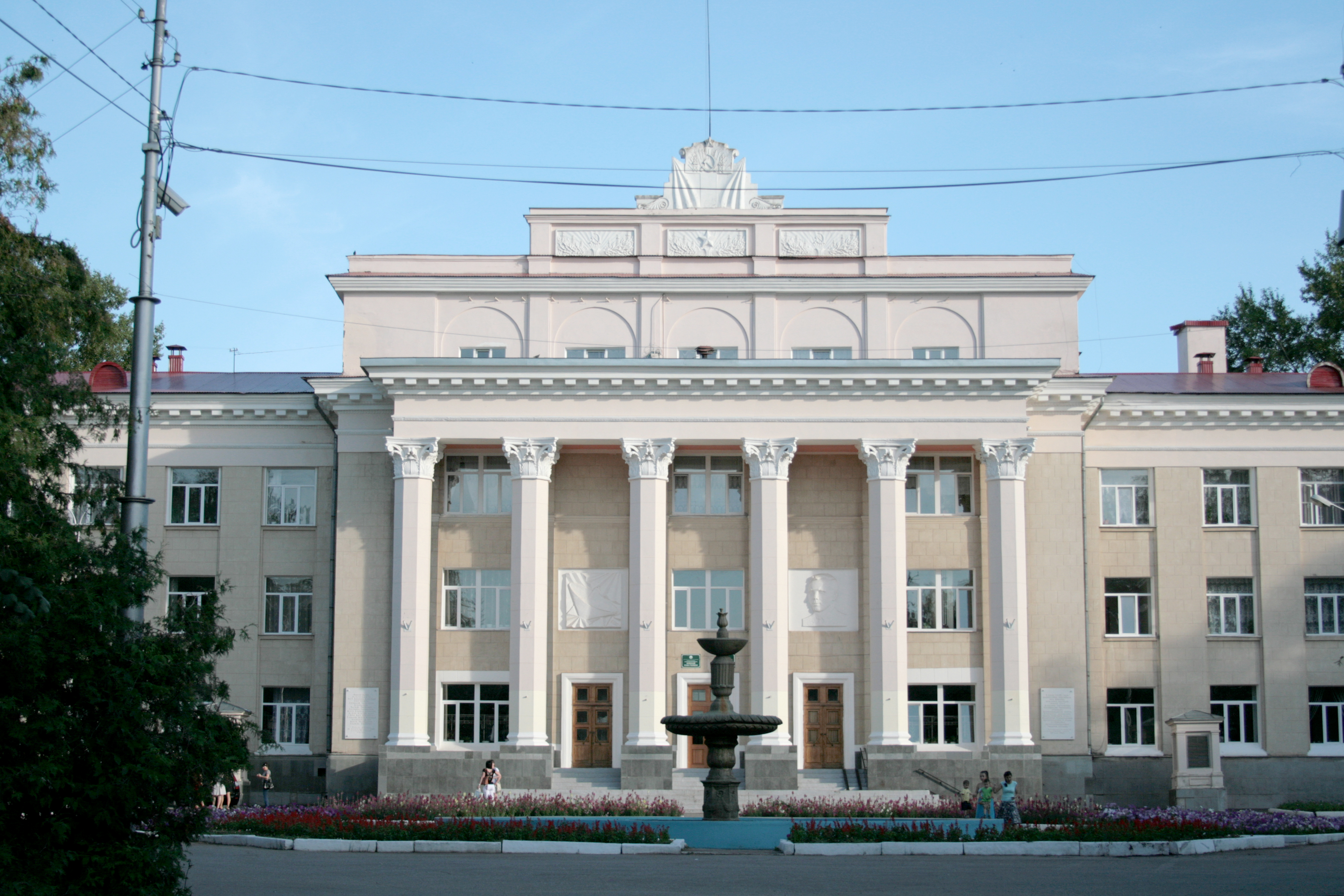
141. Oktyabrsky

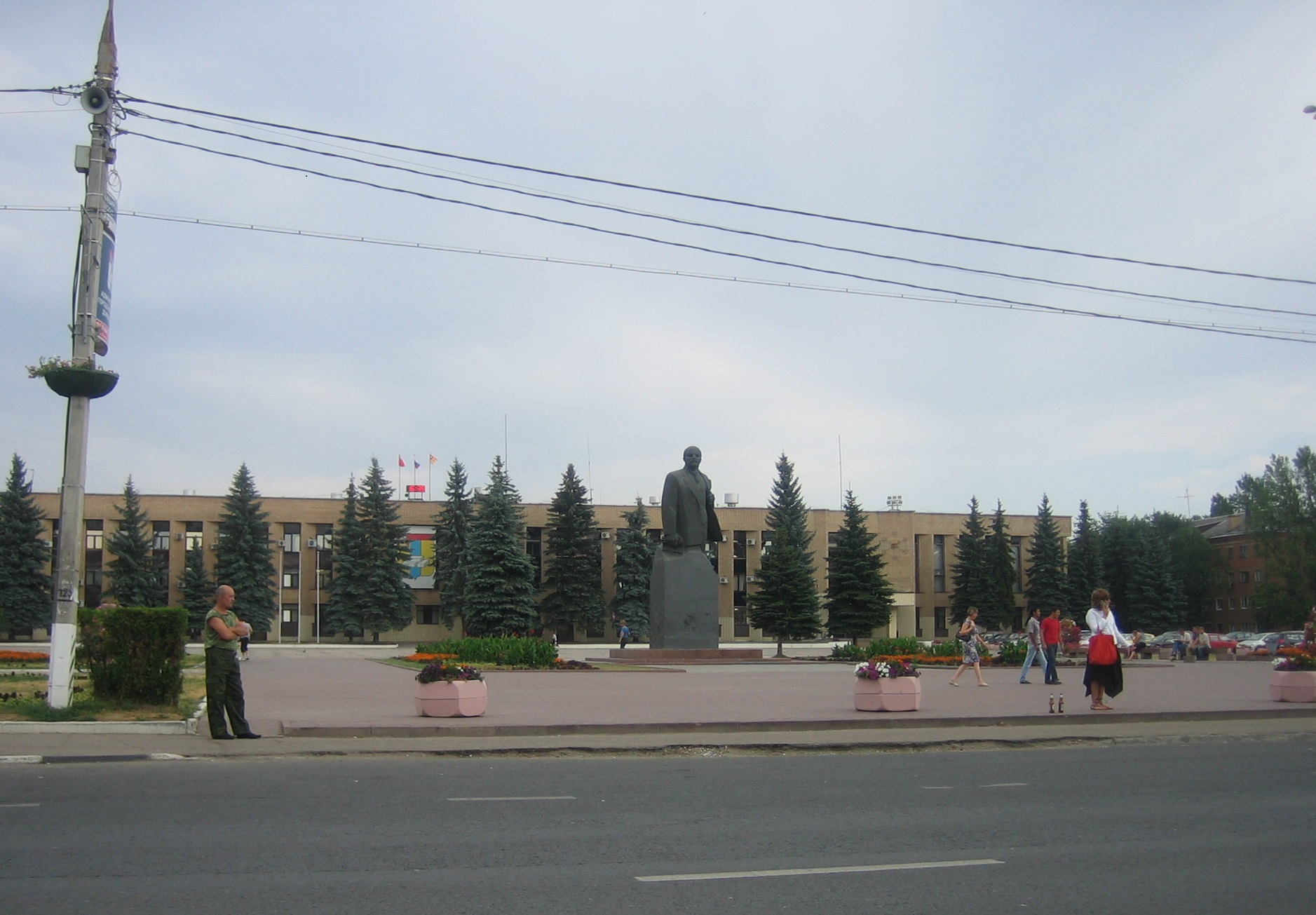
142. Domodedovo

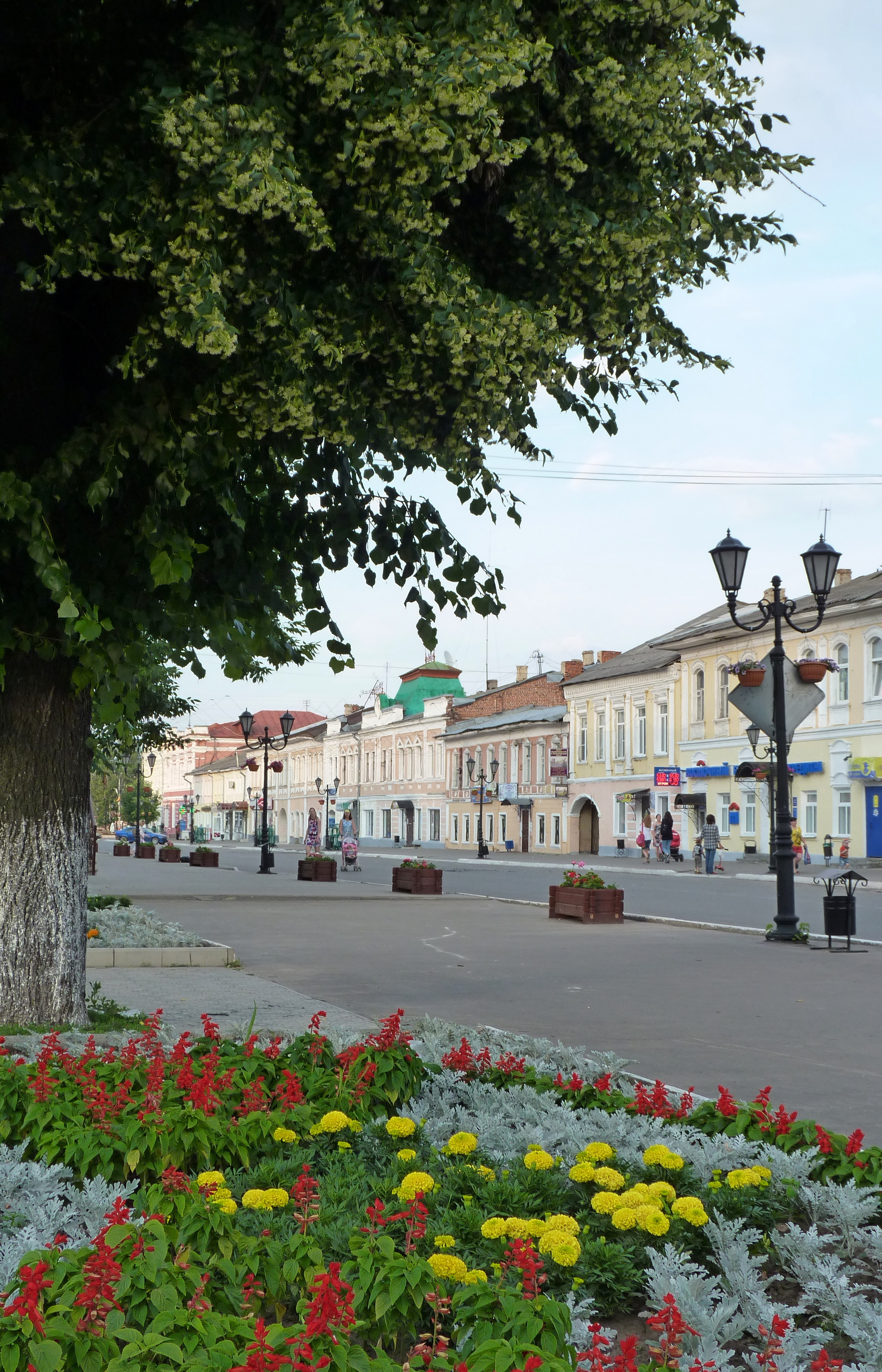
143. Murom

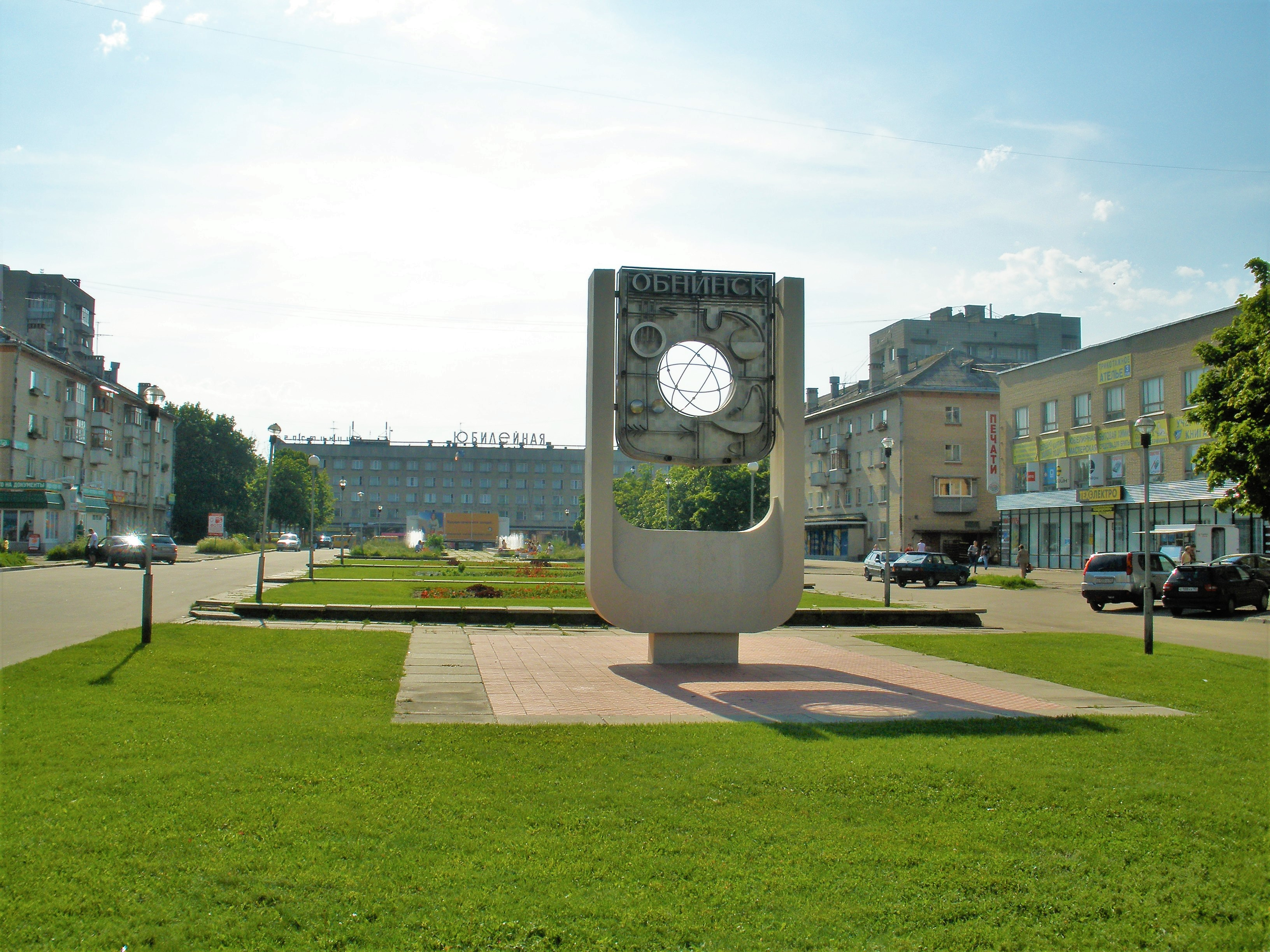
144. Obninsk

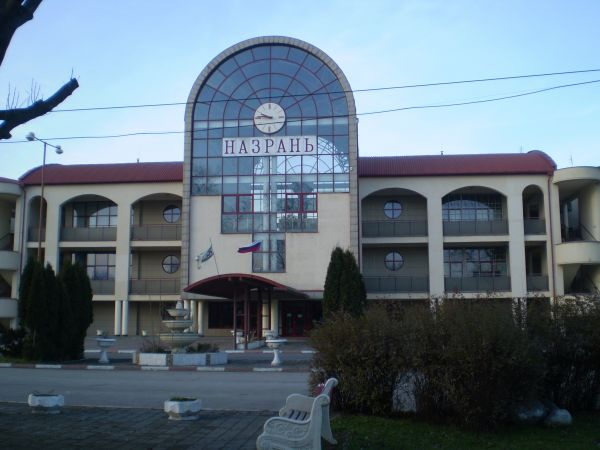
145. Nazran

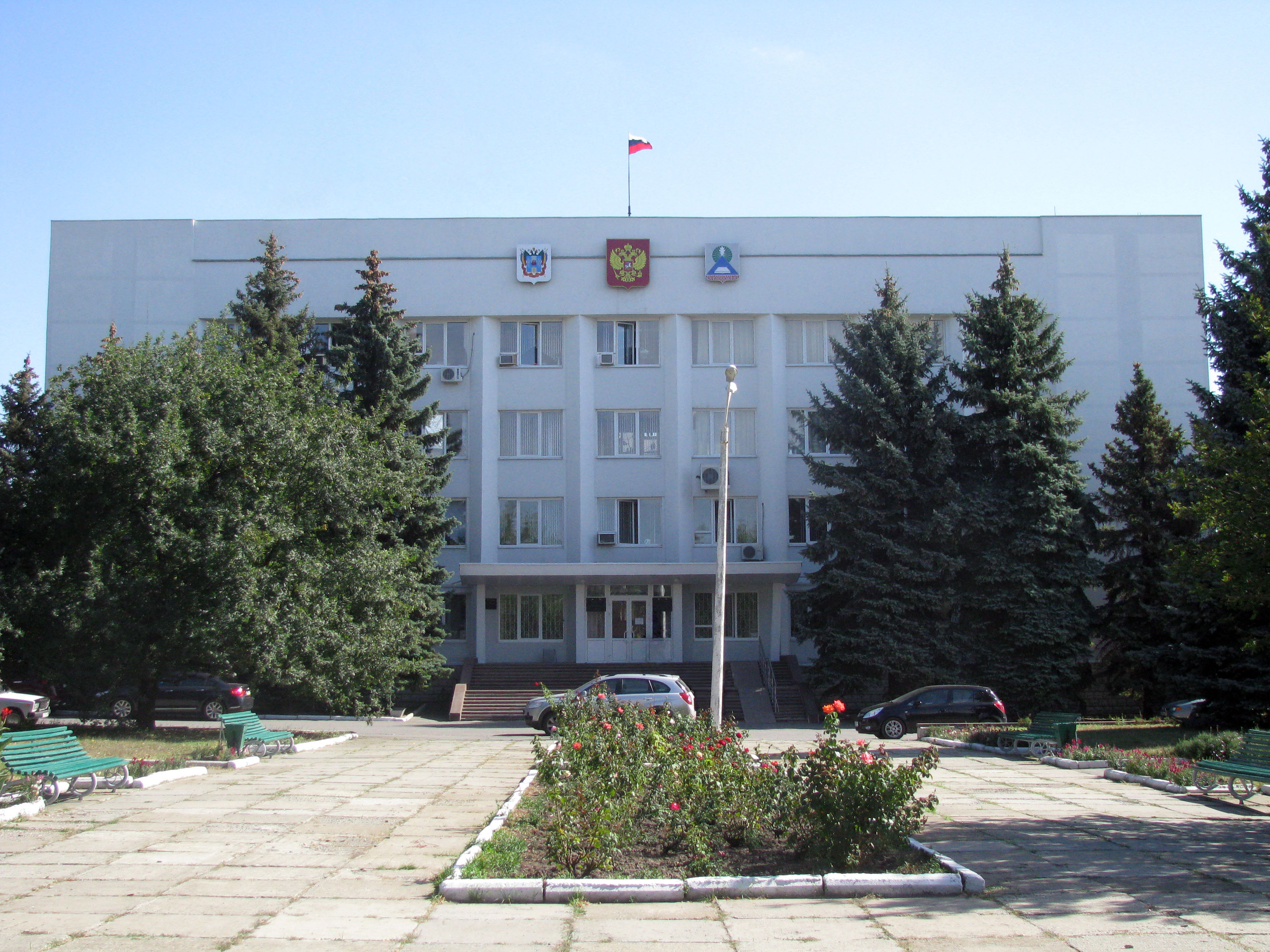
146. Novoshakhtinsk

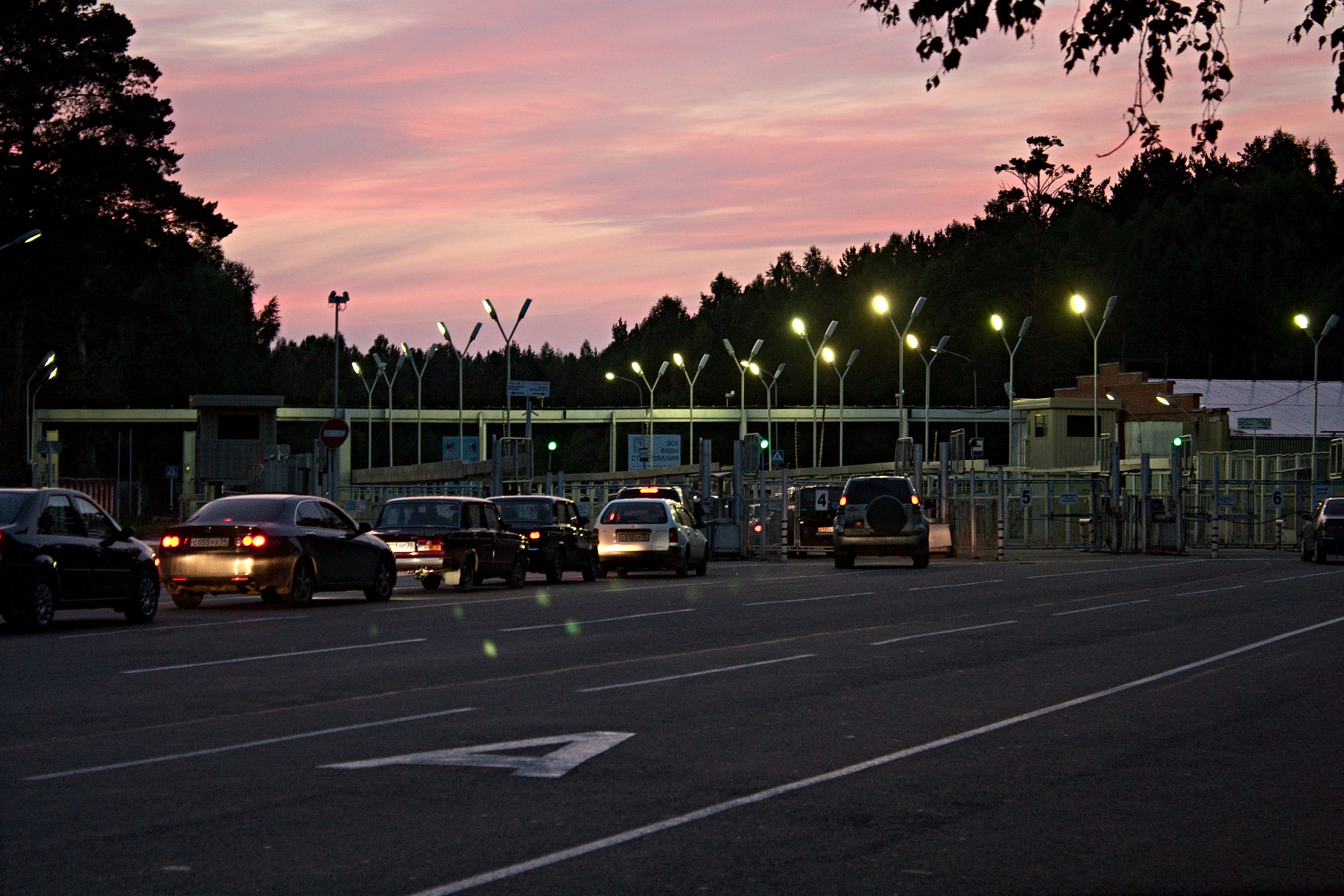
147. Seversk

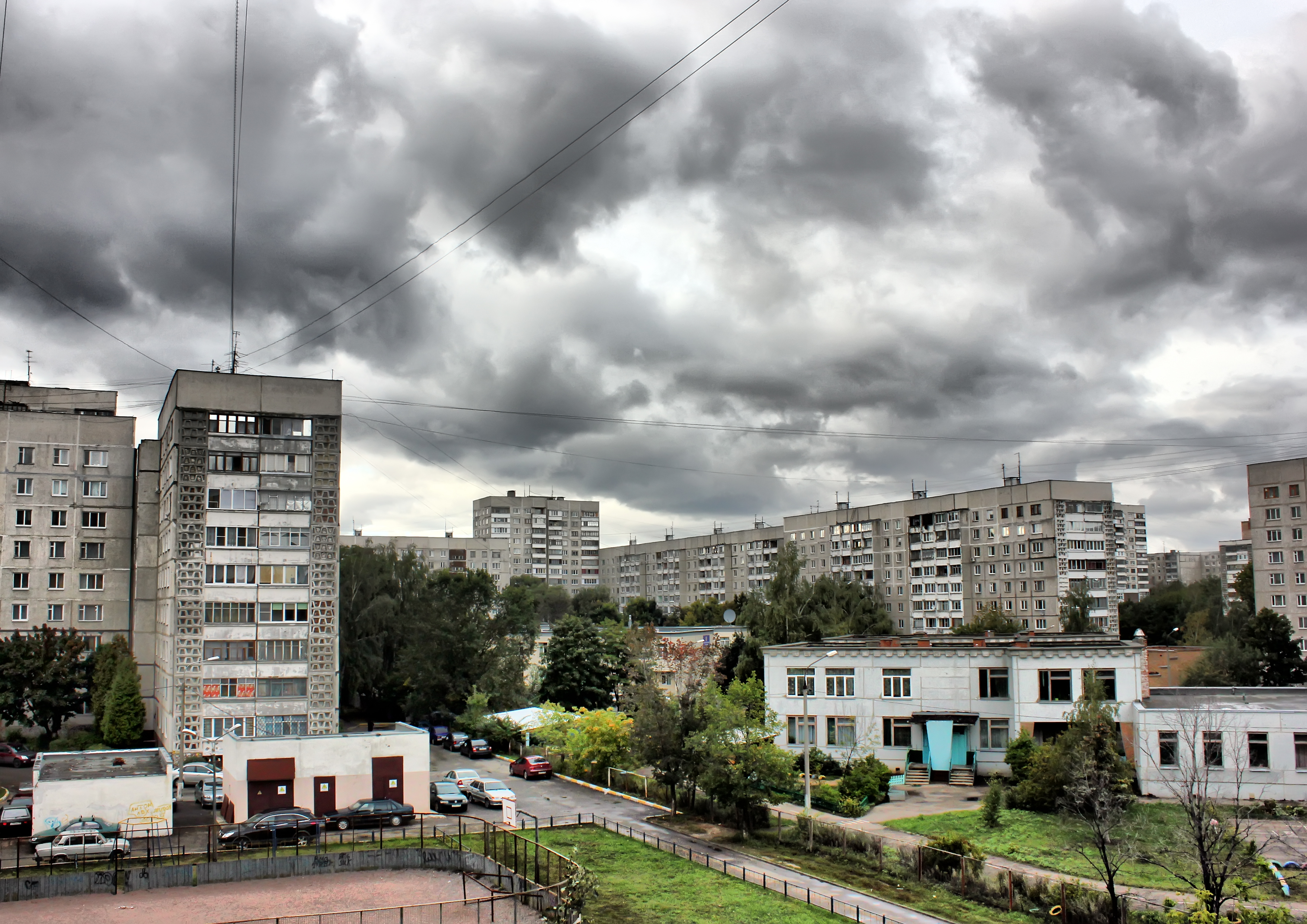
148. Zhukovsky

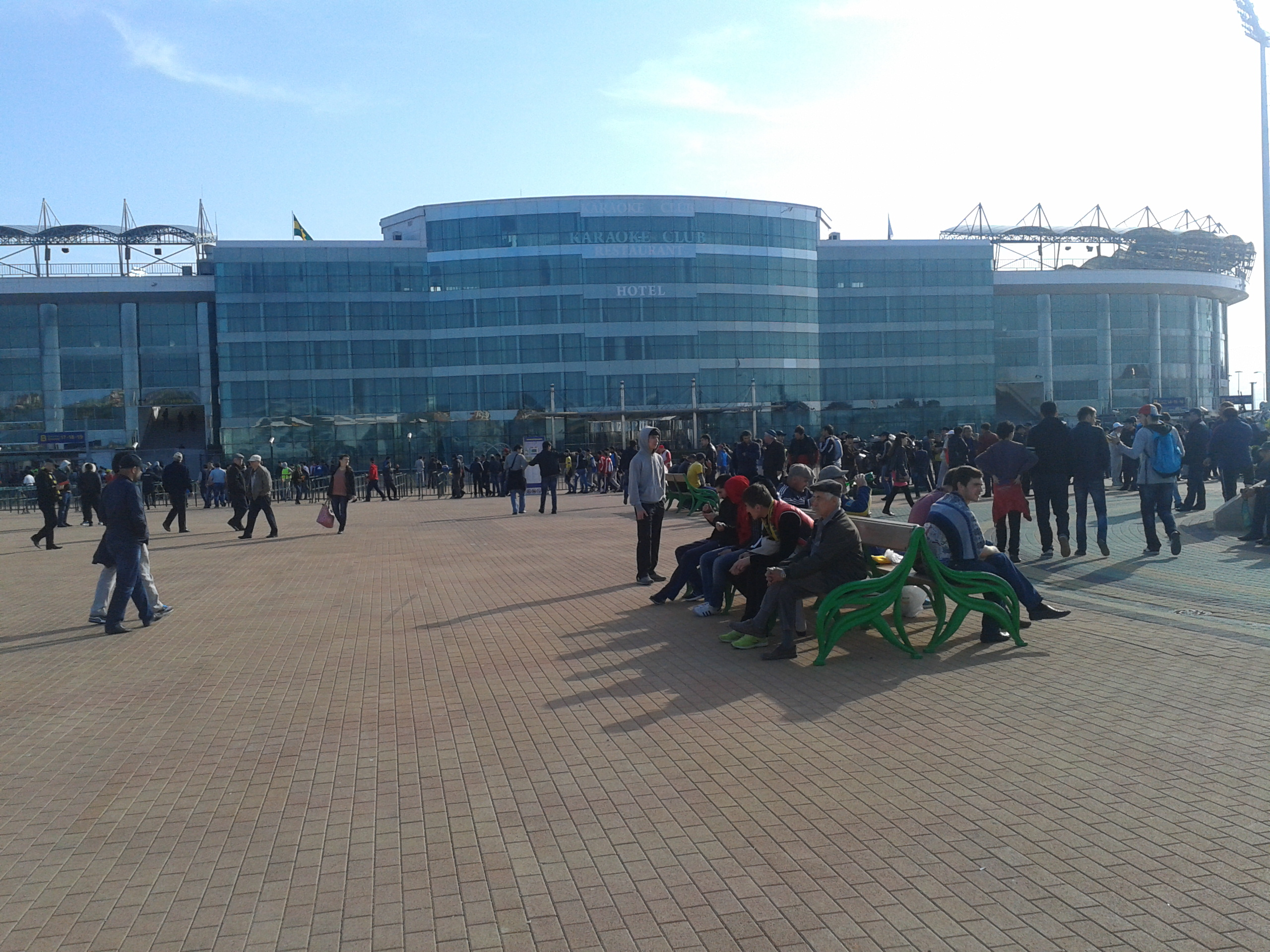
149. Kaspiysk

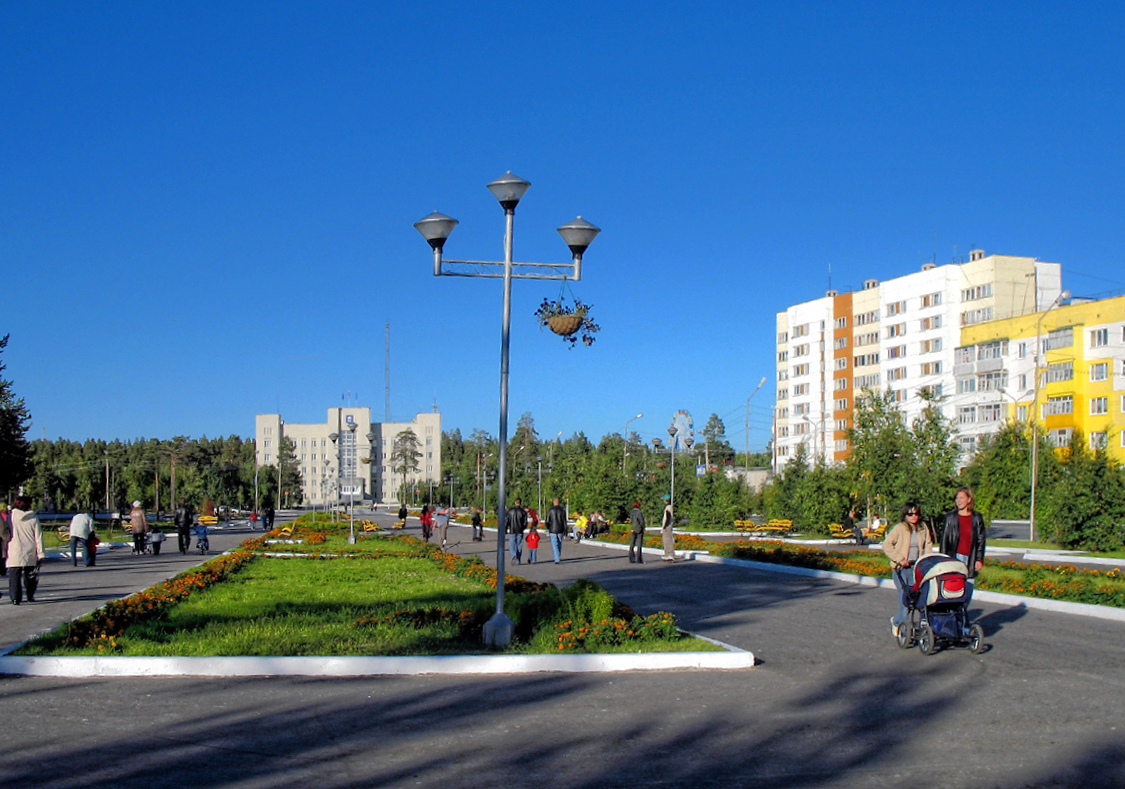
150. Noyabrsk

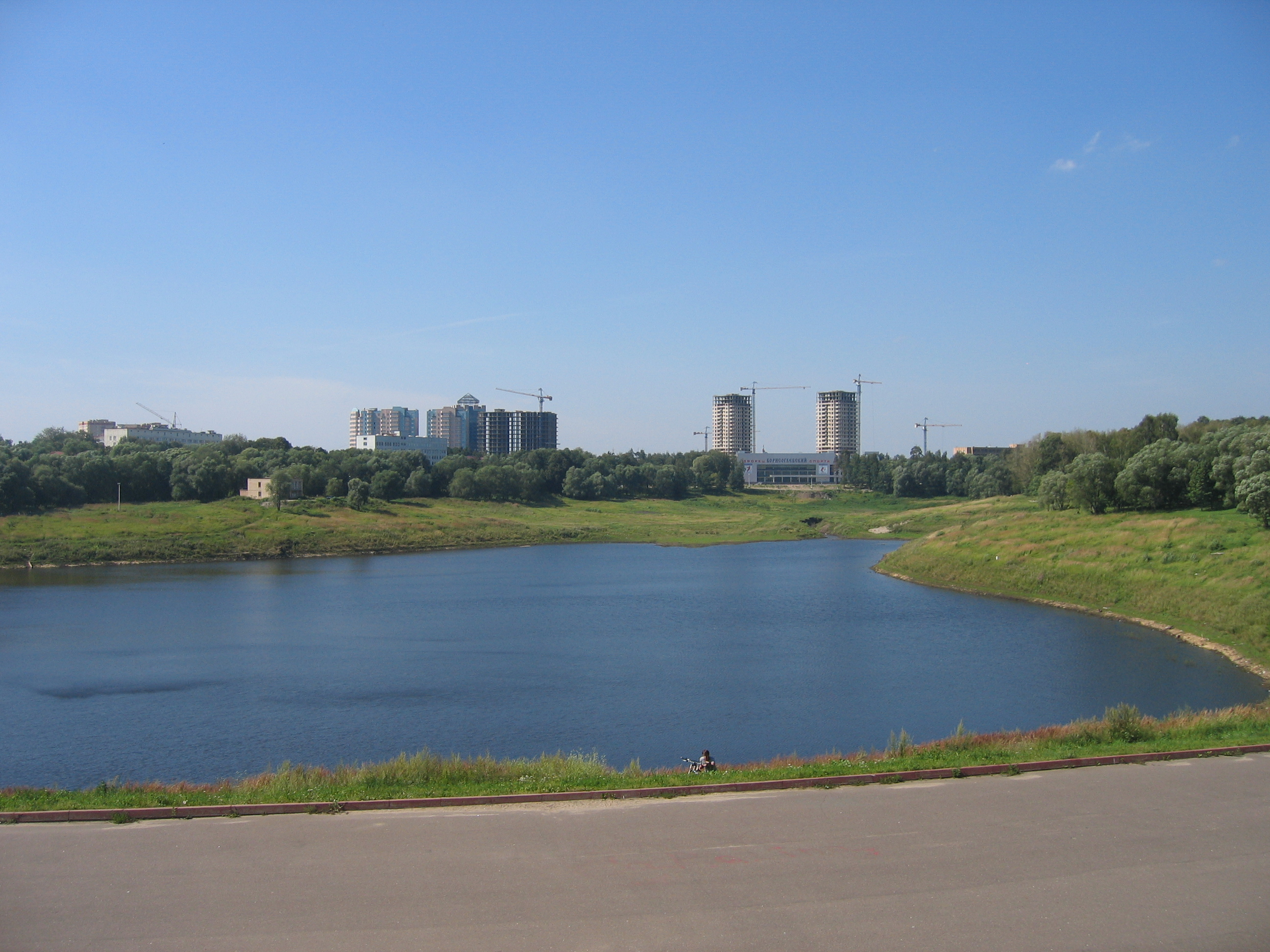
151. Ramenskoye

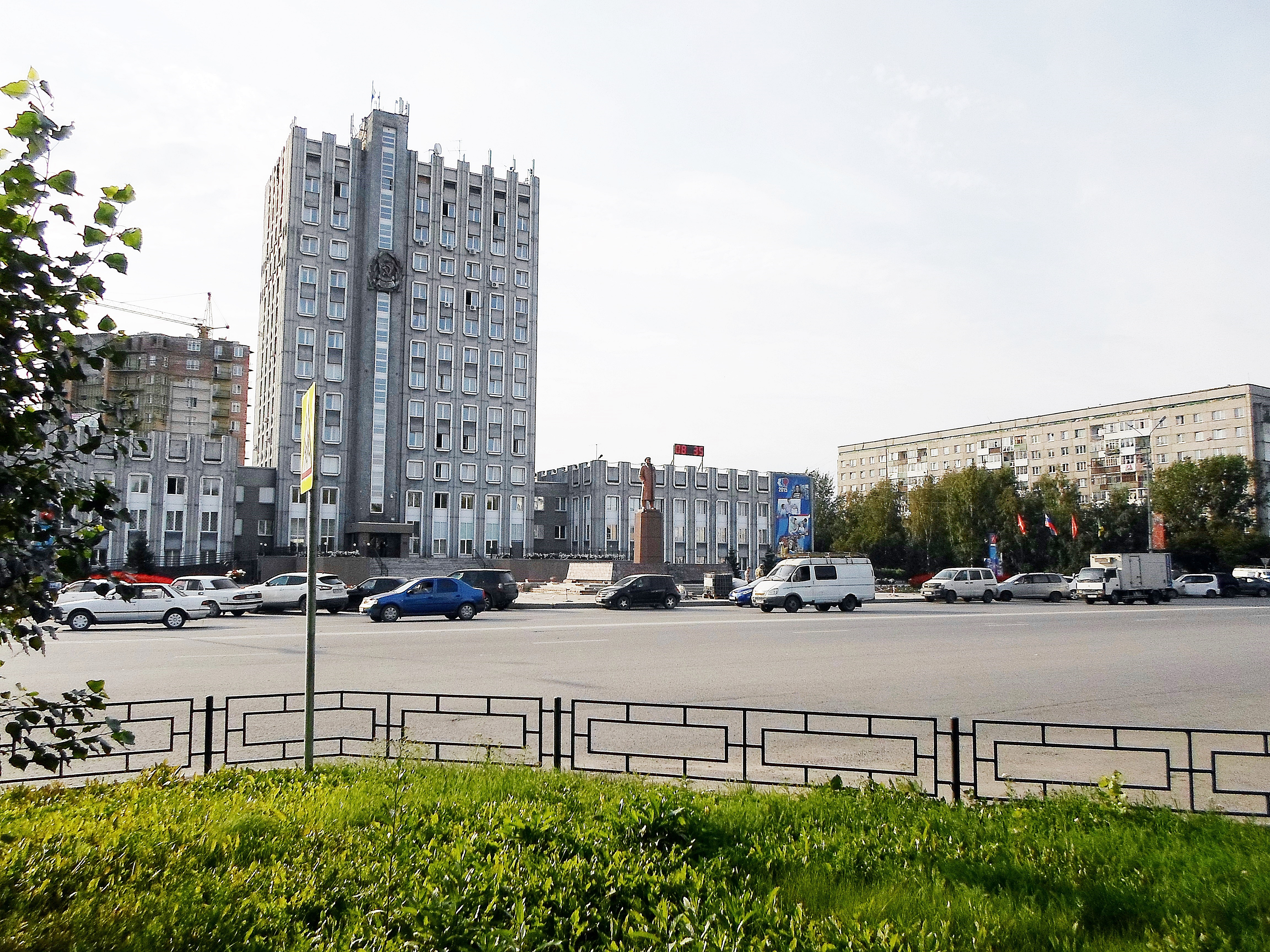
153. Achinsk

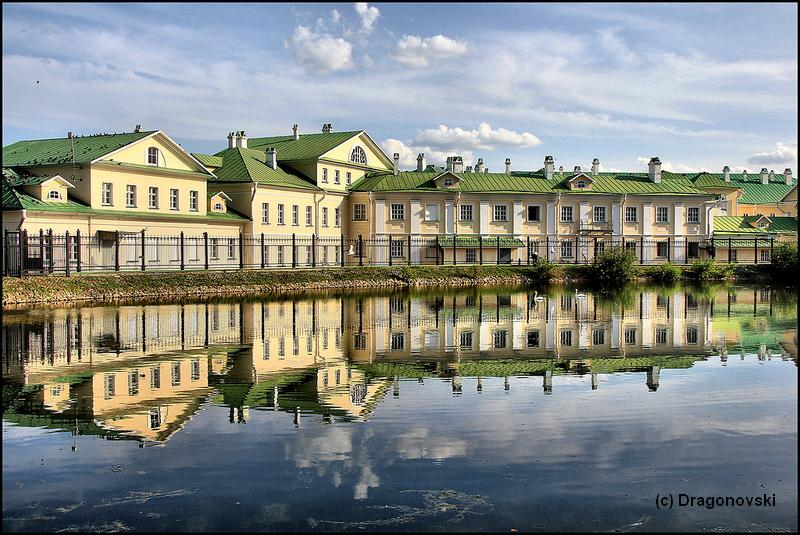
154. Sergiyev Posad

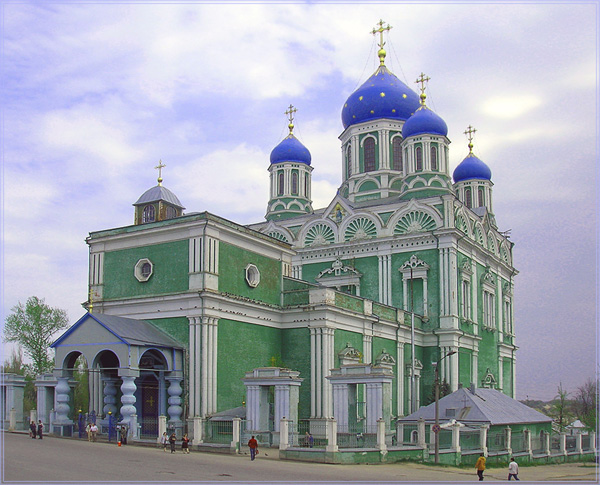
155. Yelets

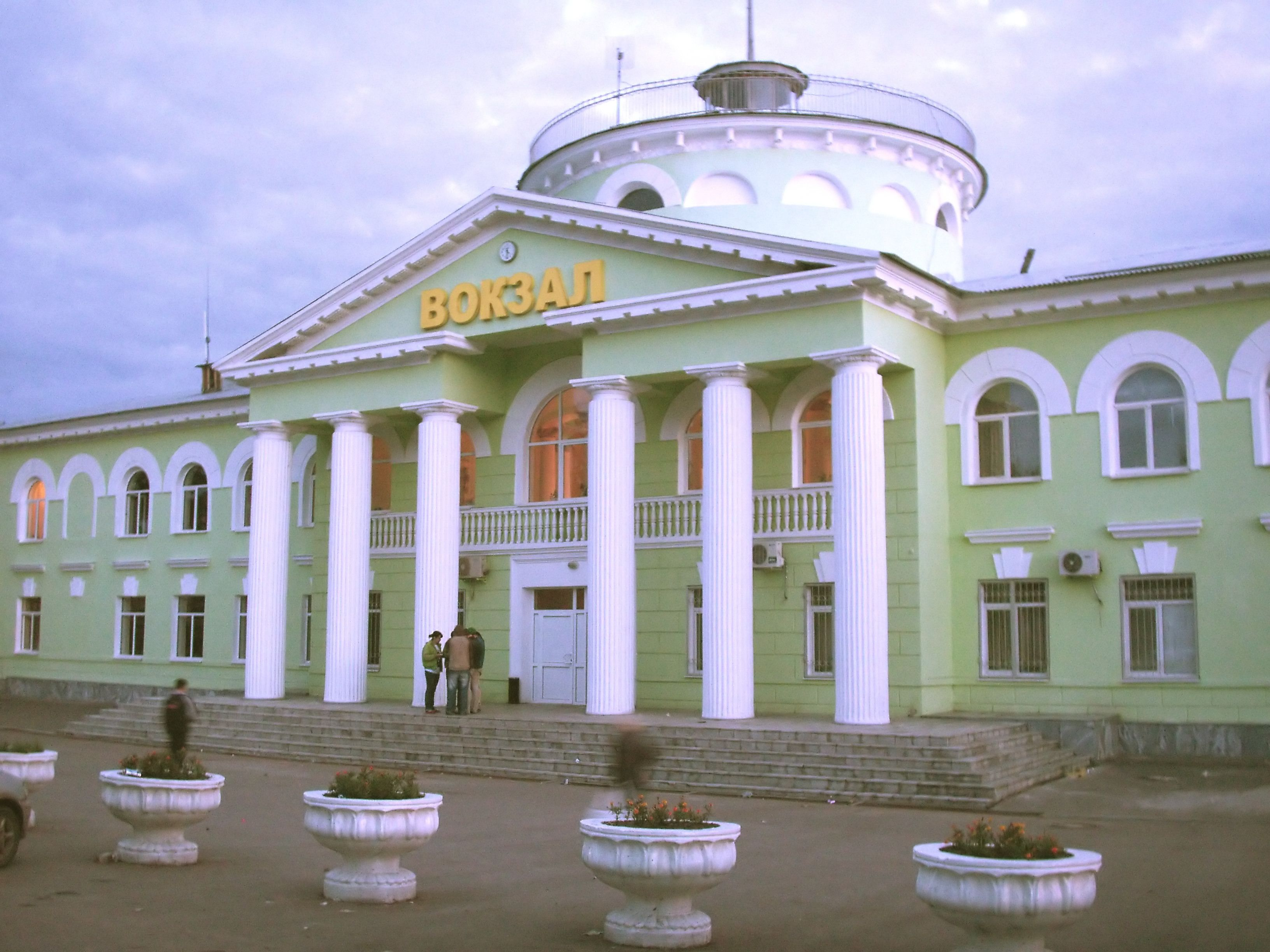
156. Novokuybyshevsk

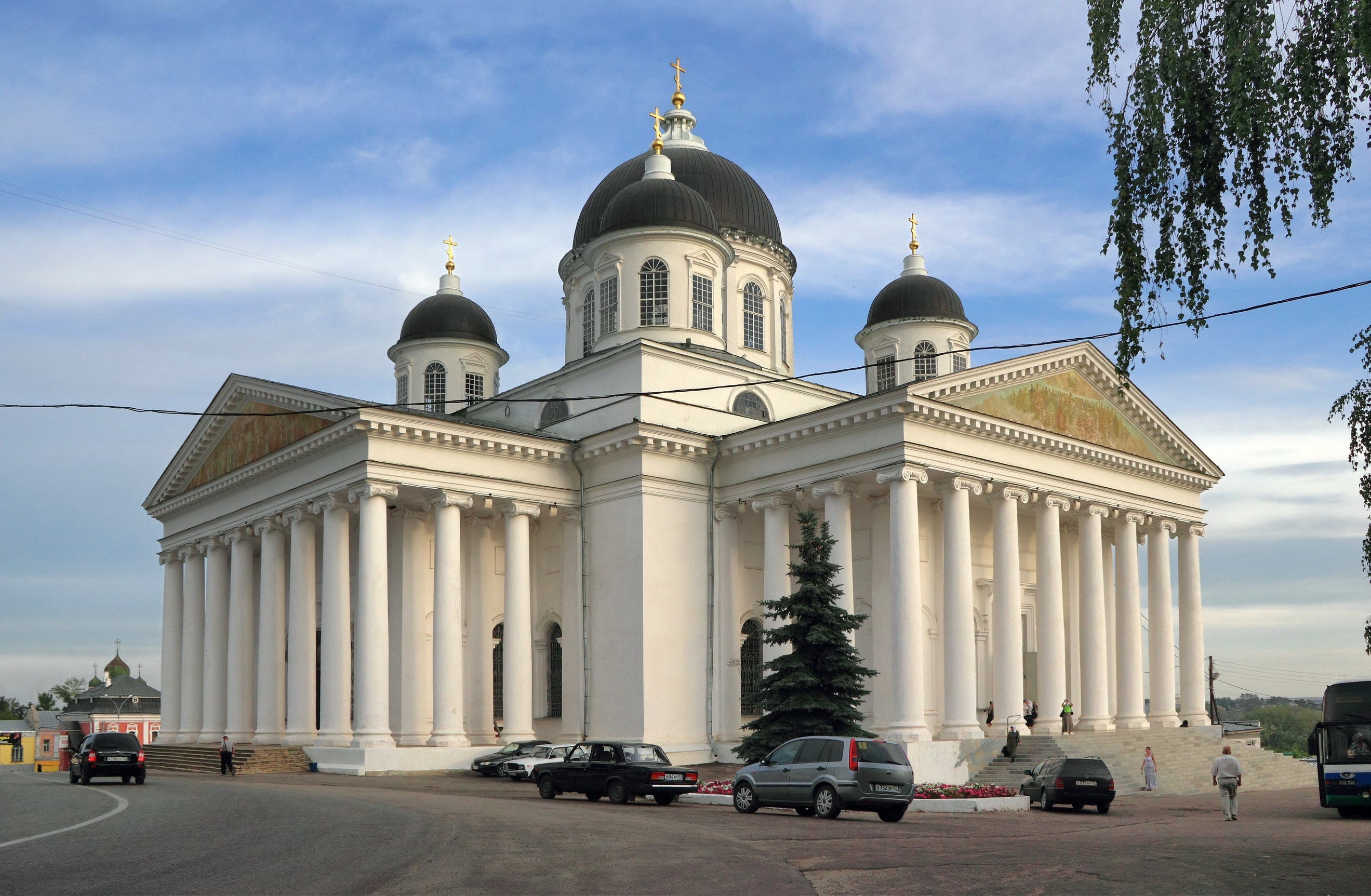
157. Arzamas

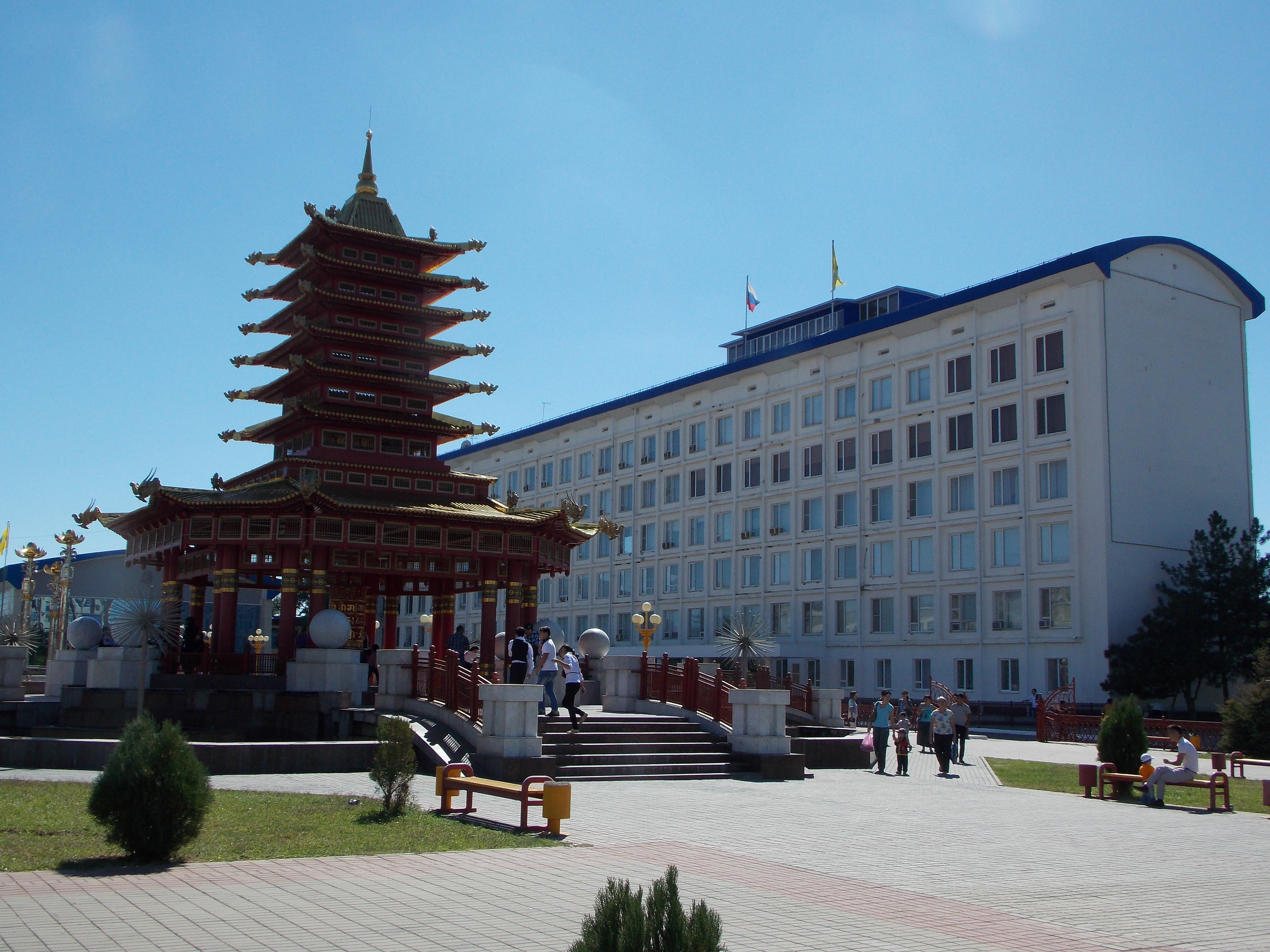
158. Elista

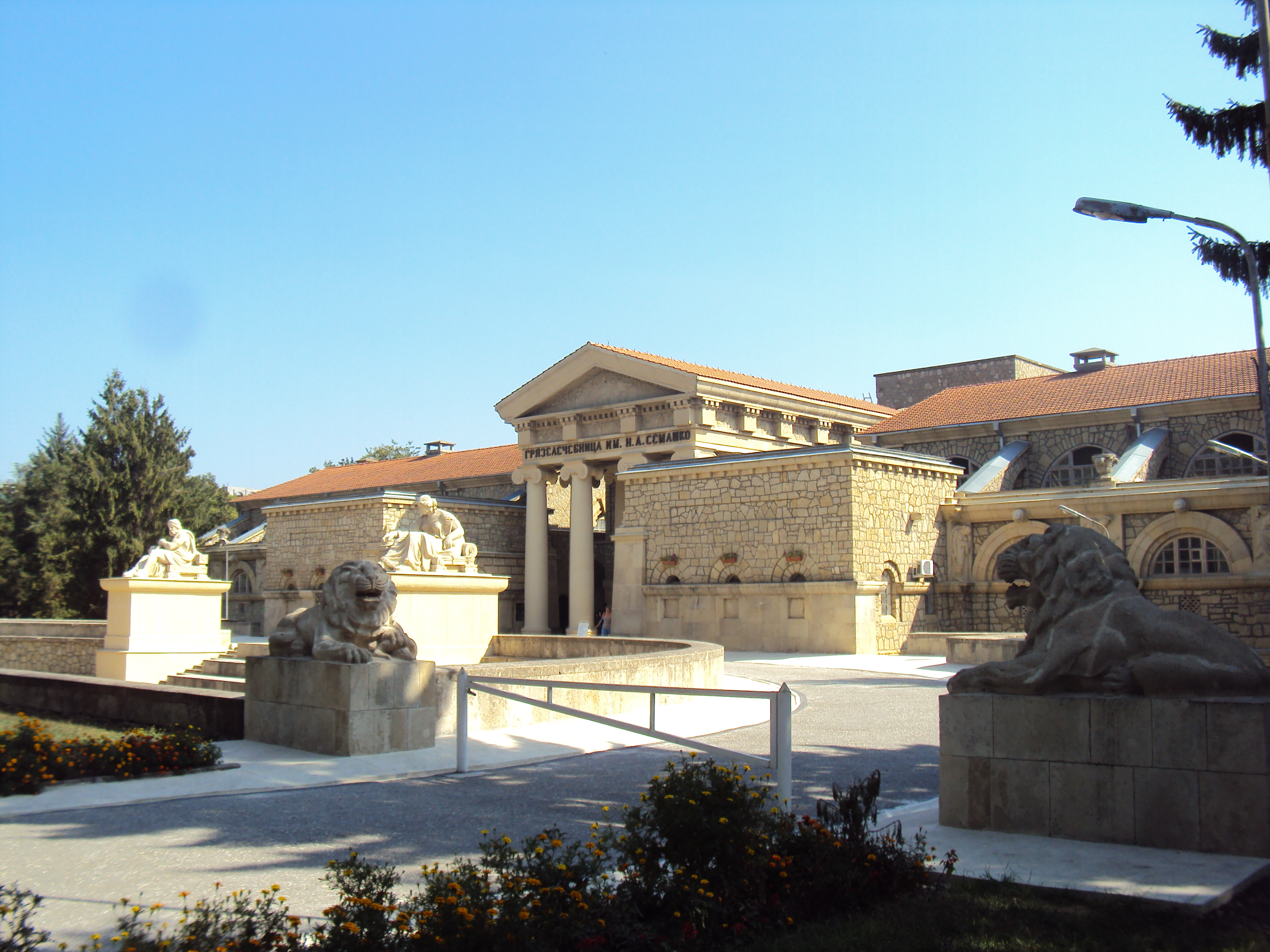
159. Yessentuki

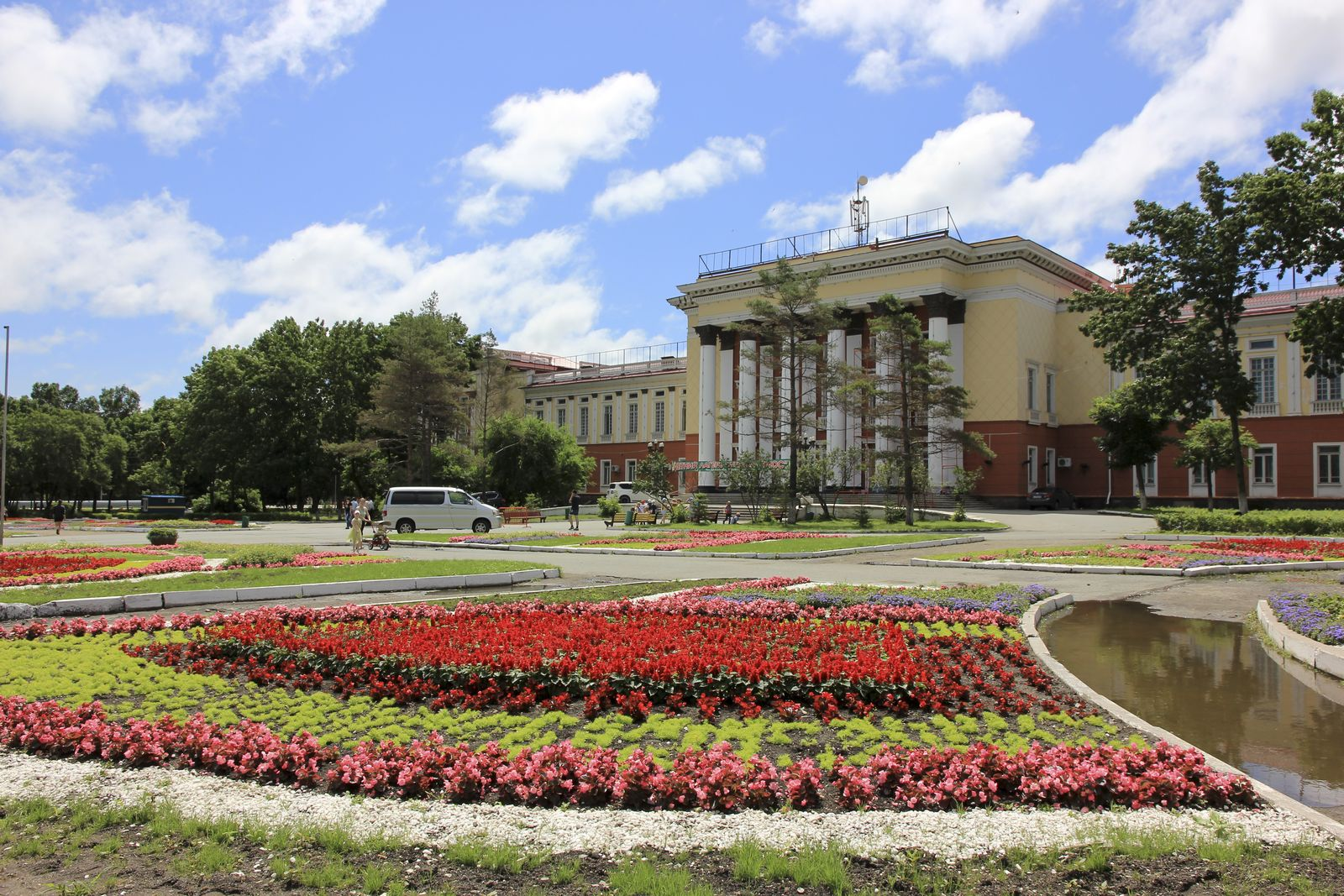
160. Artyom

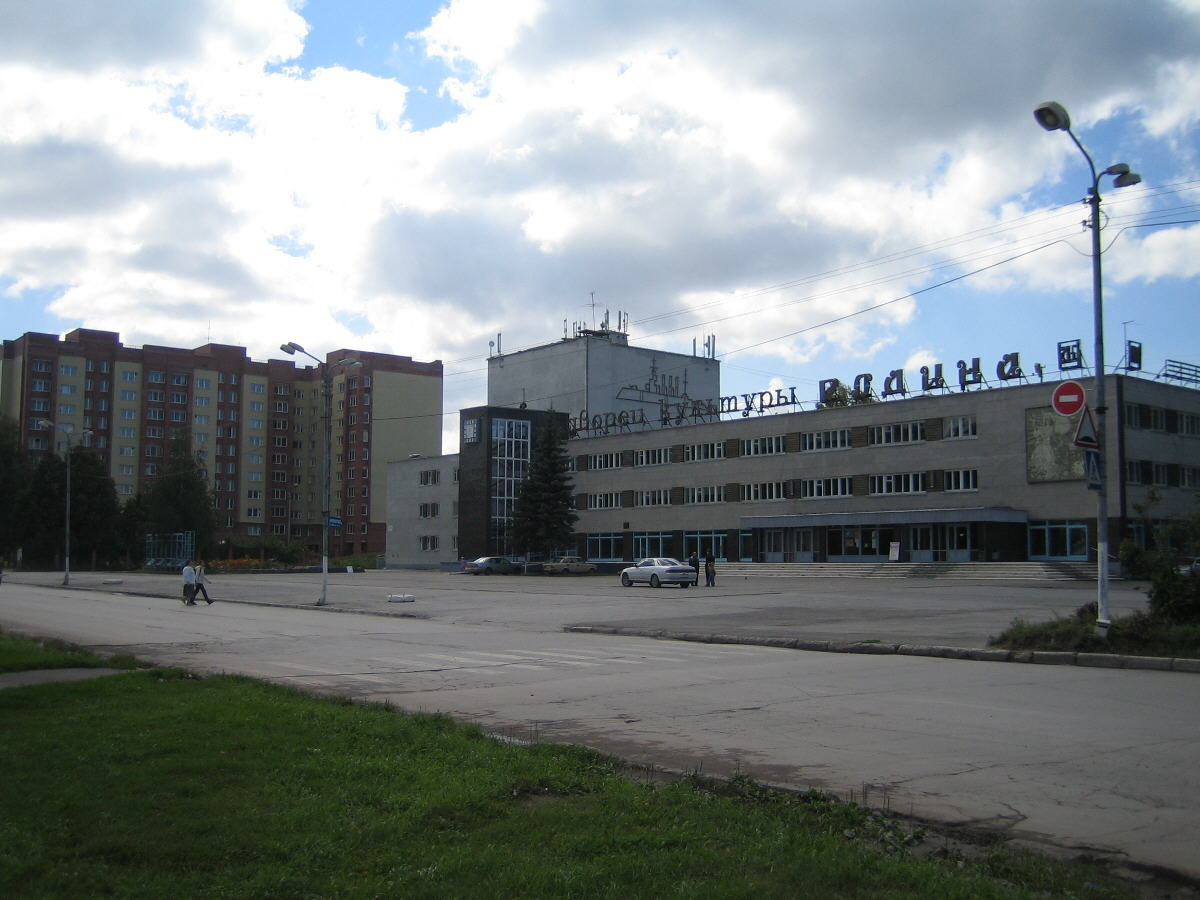
161. Berdsk

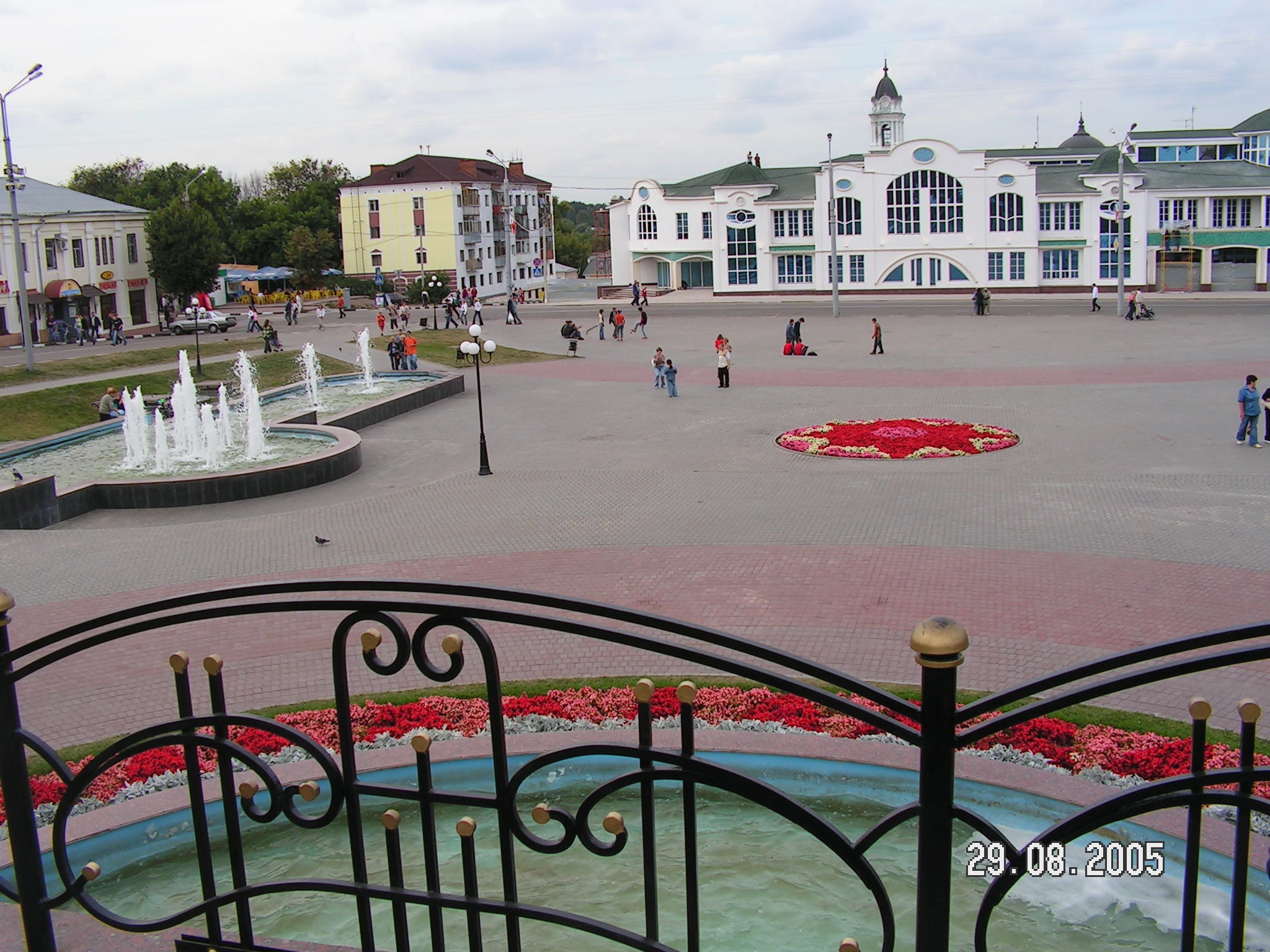
162. Noginsk

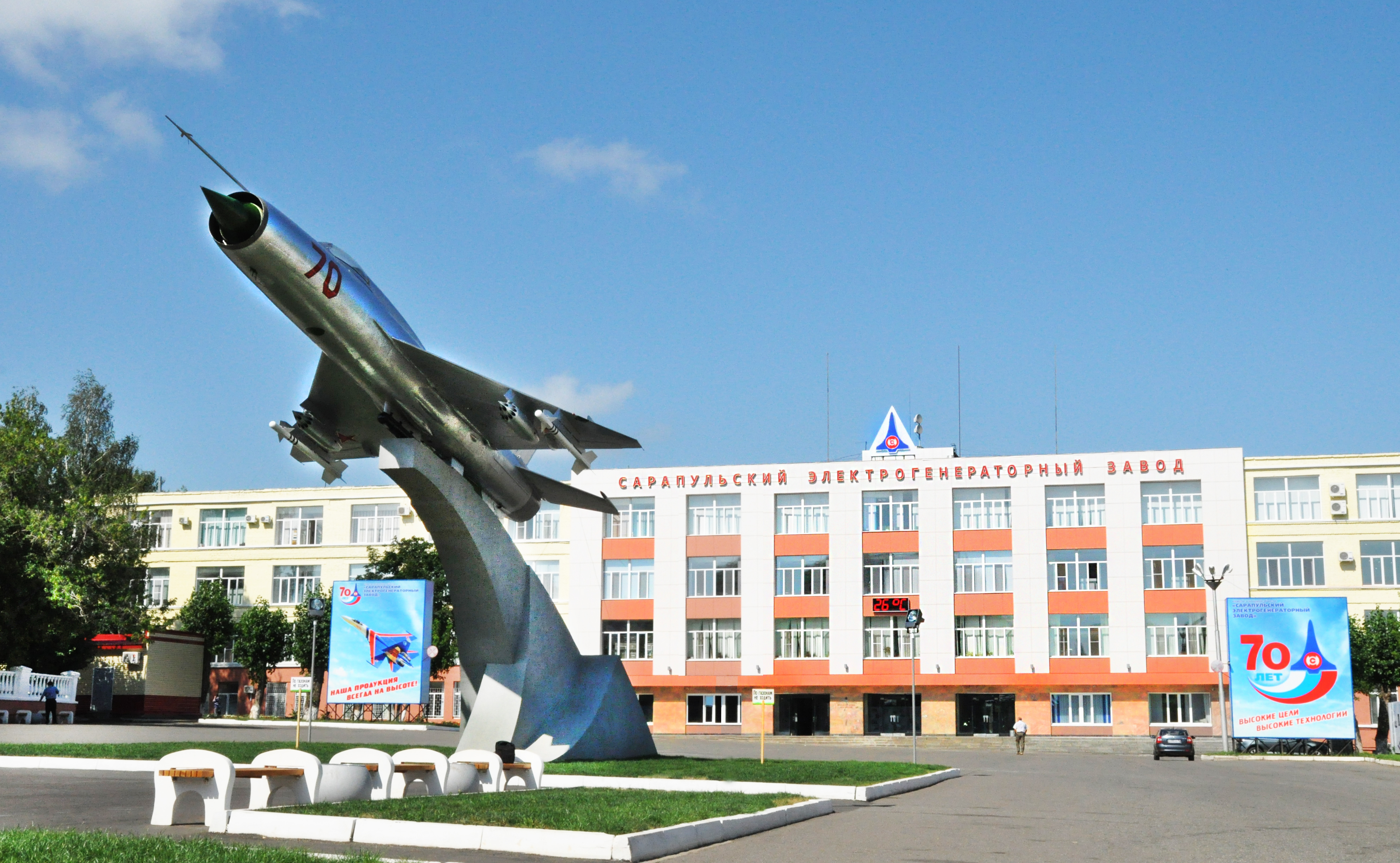
163. Sarapul

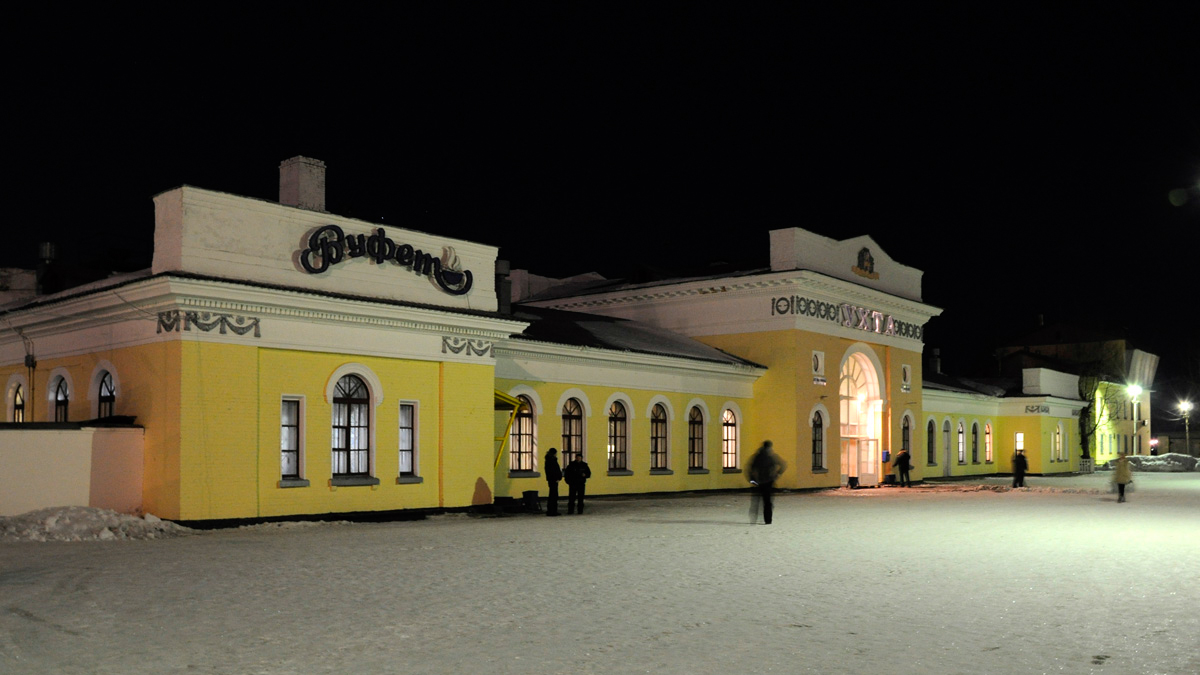
164. Ukhta

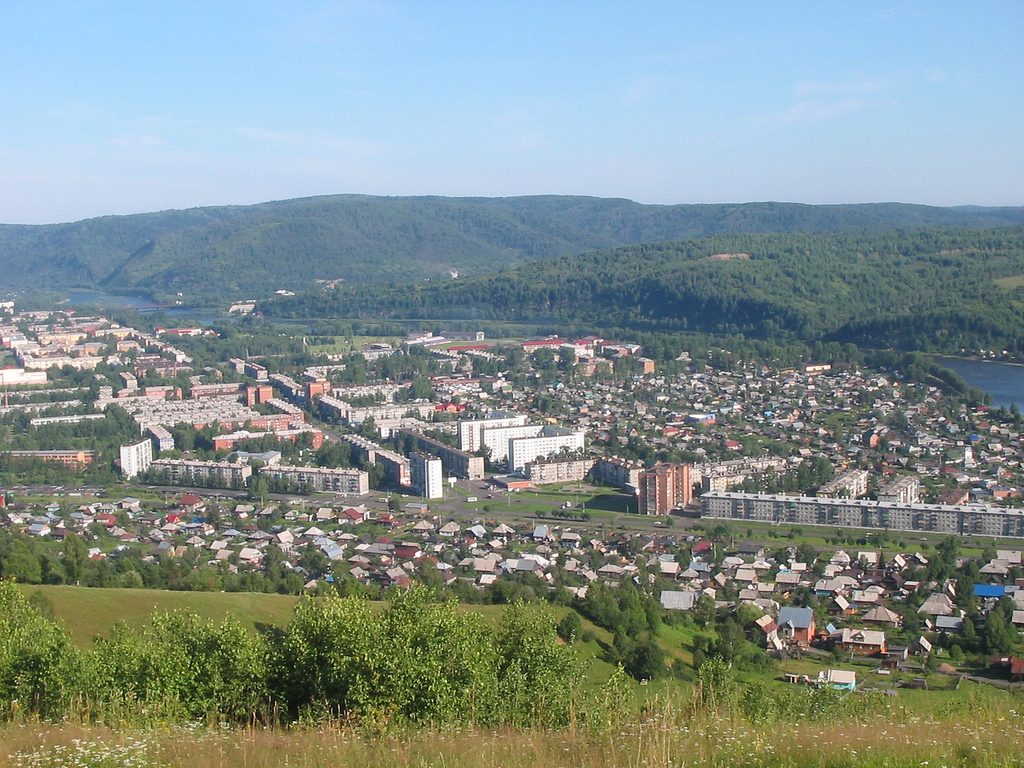
165. Mezhdurechensk

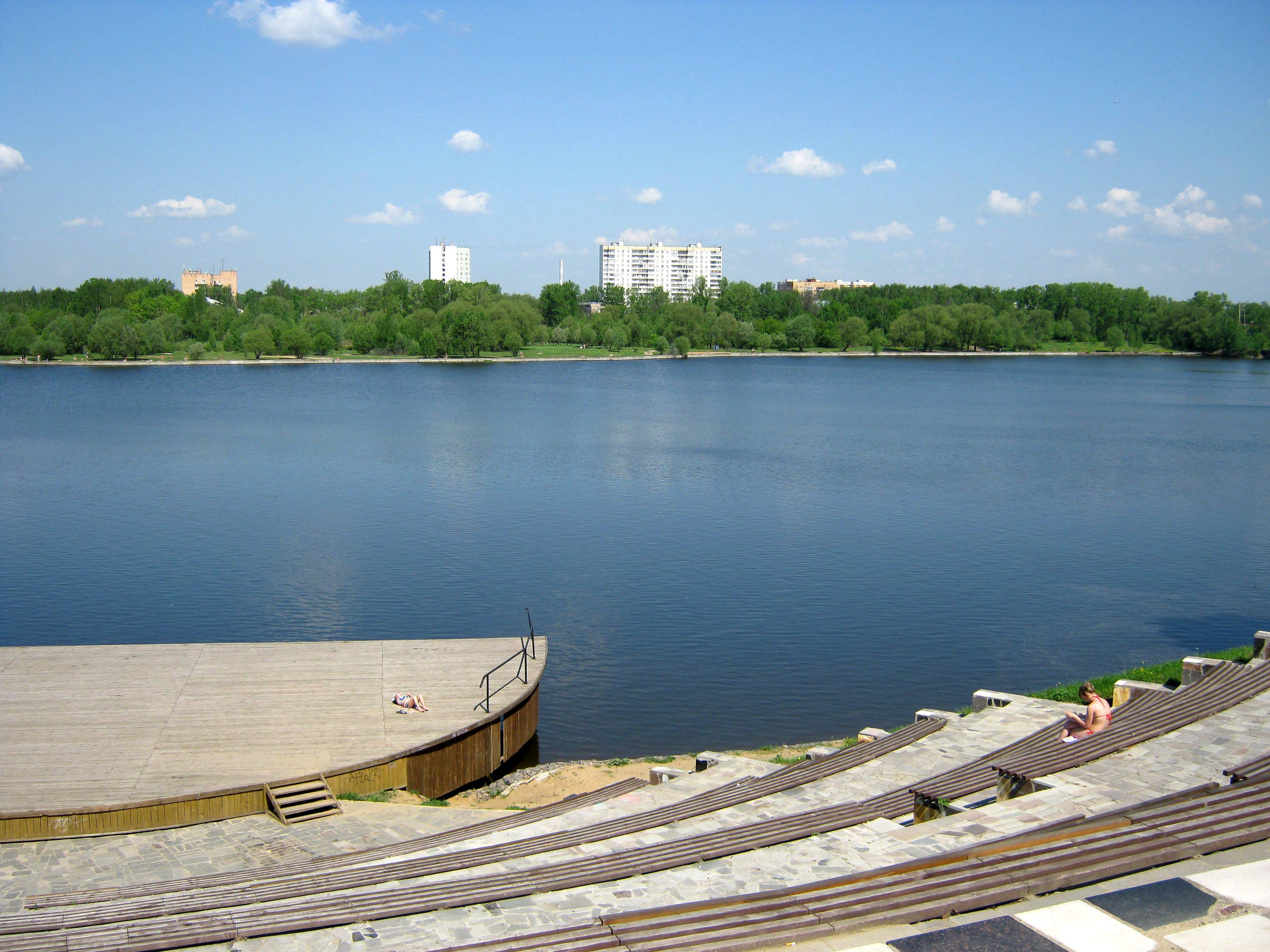
166. Dolgoprudny

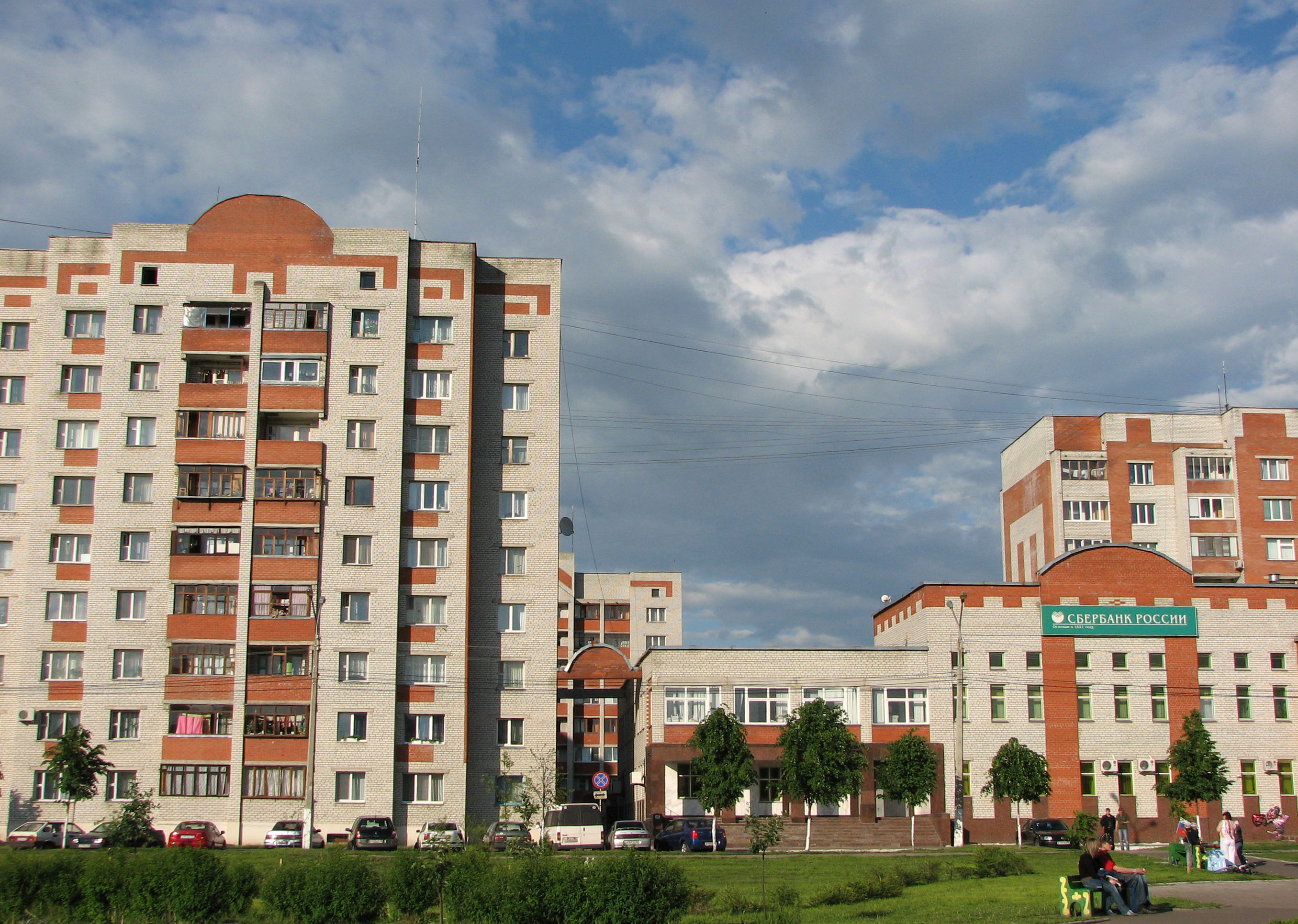
167. Zheleznogorsk

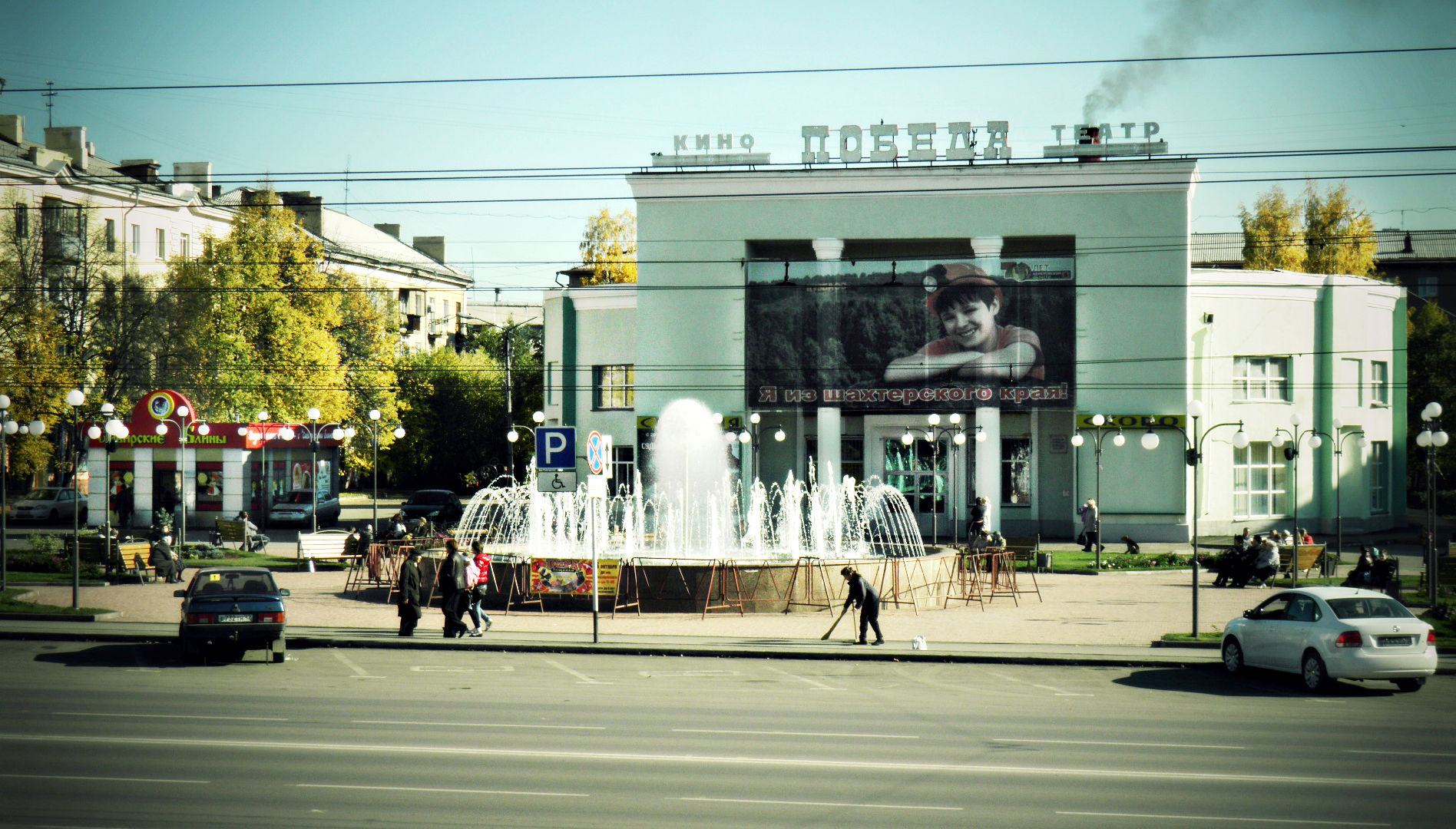
168. Leninsk-Kuznetsky

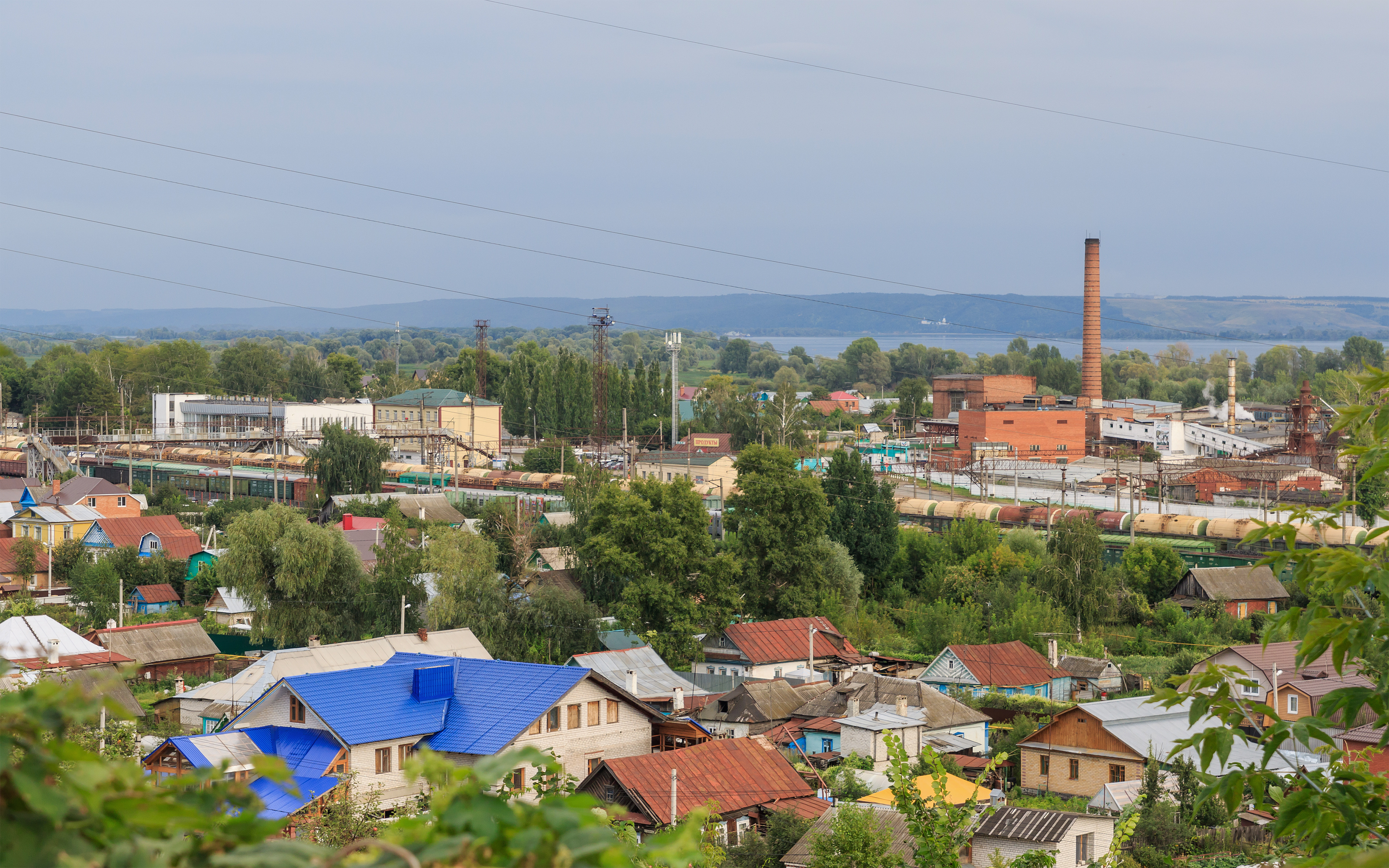
169. Zelenodolsk

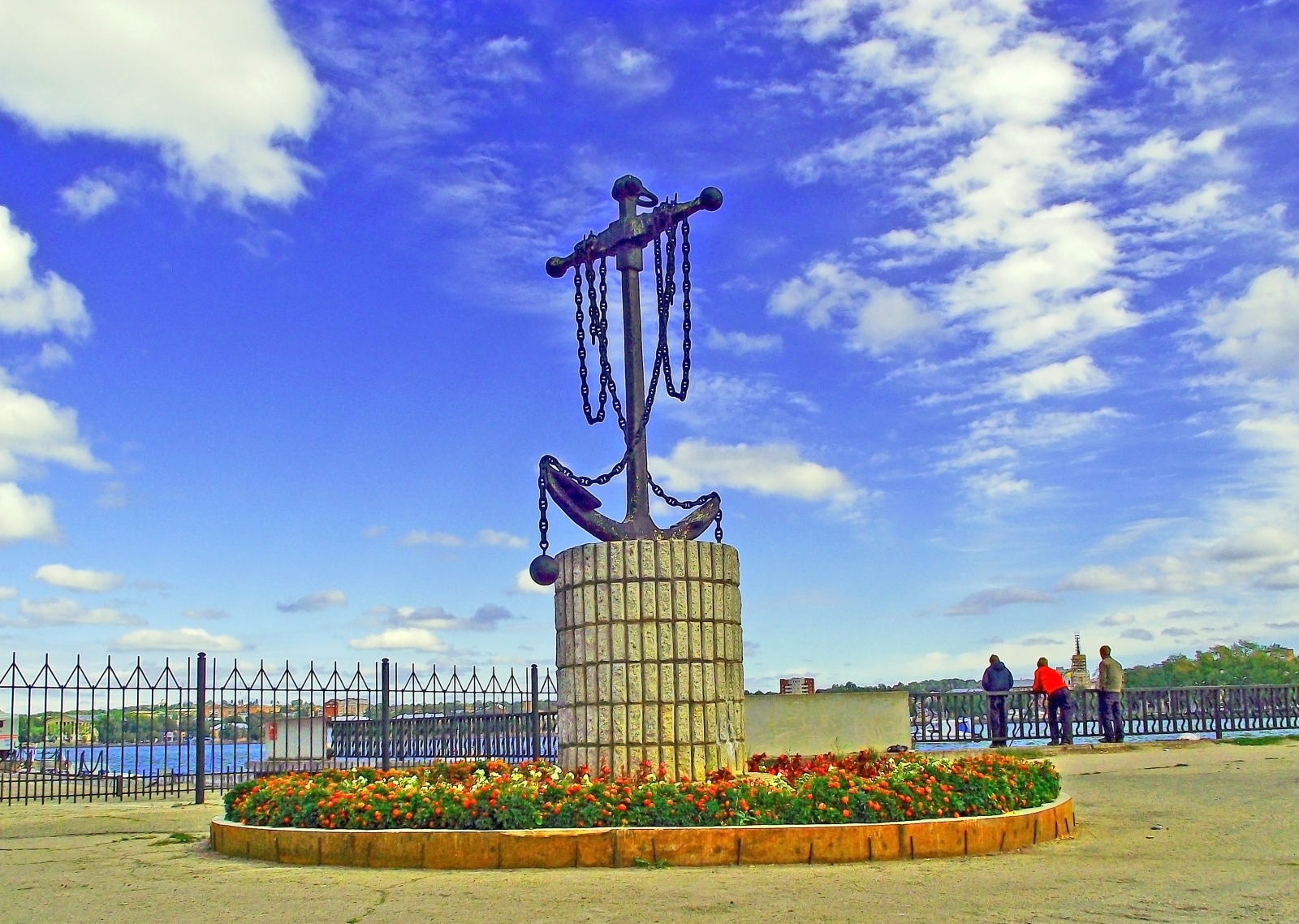
170. Votkinsk

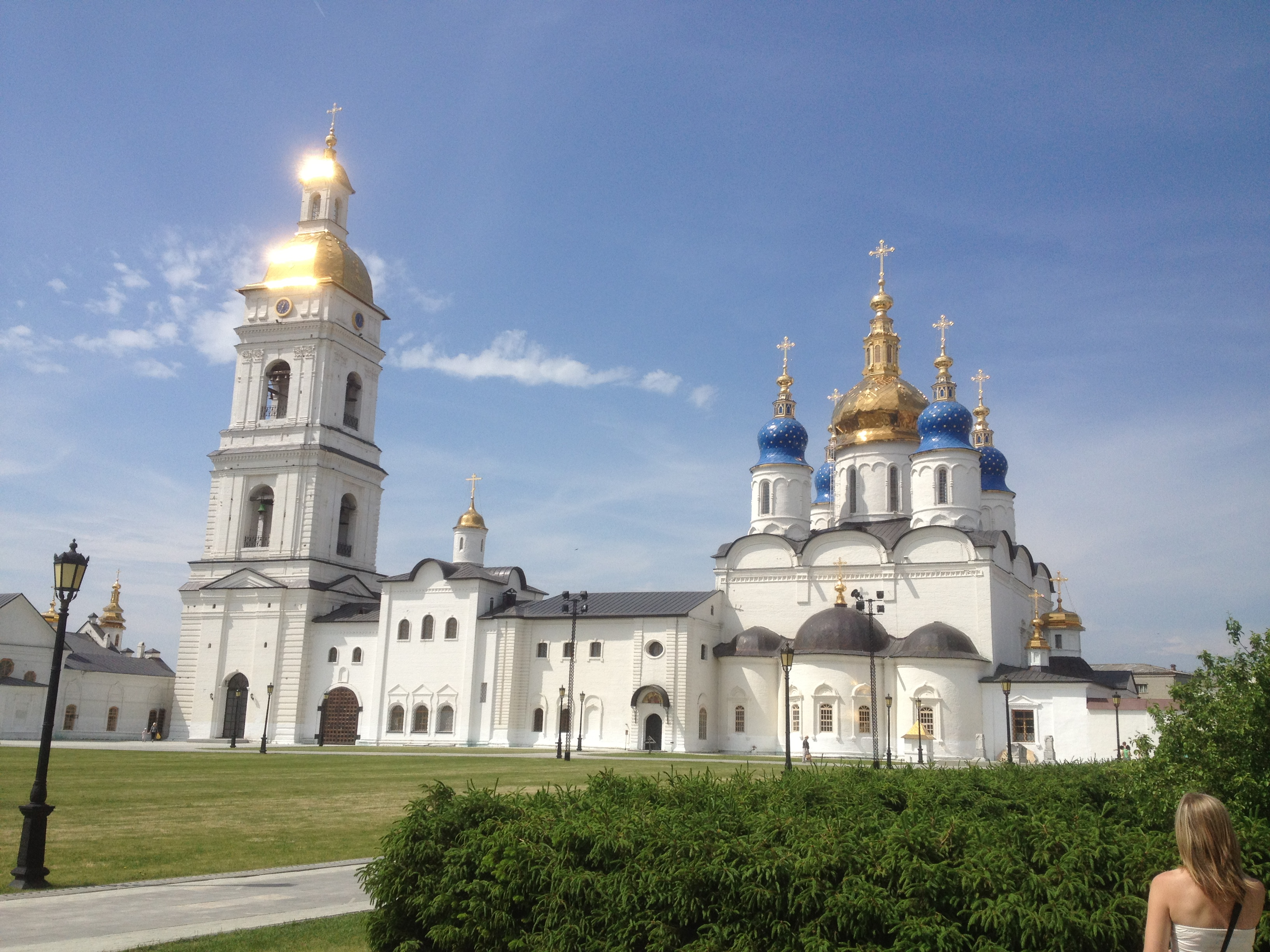
171. Tobolsk

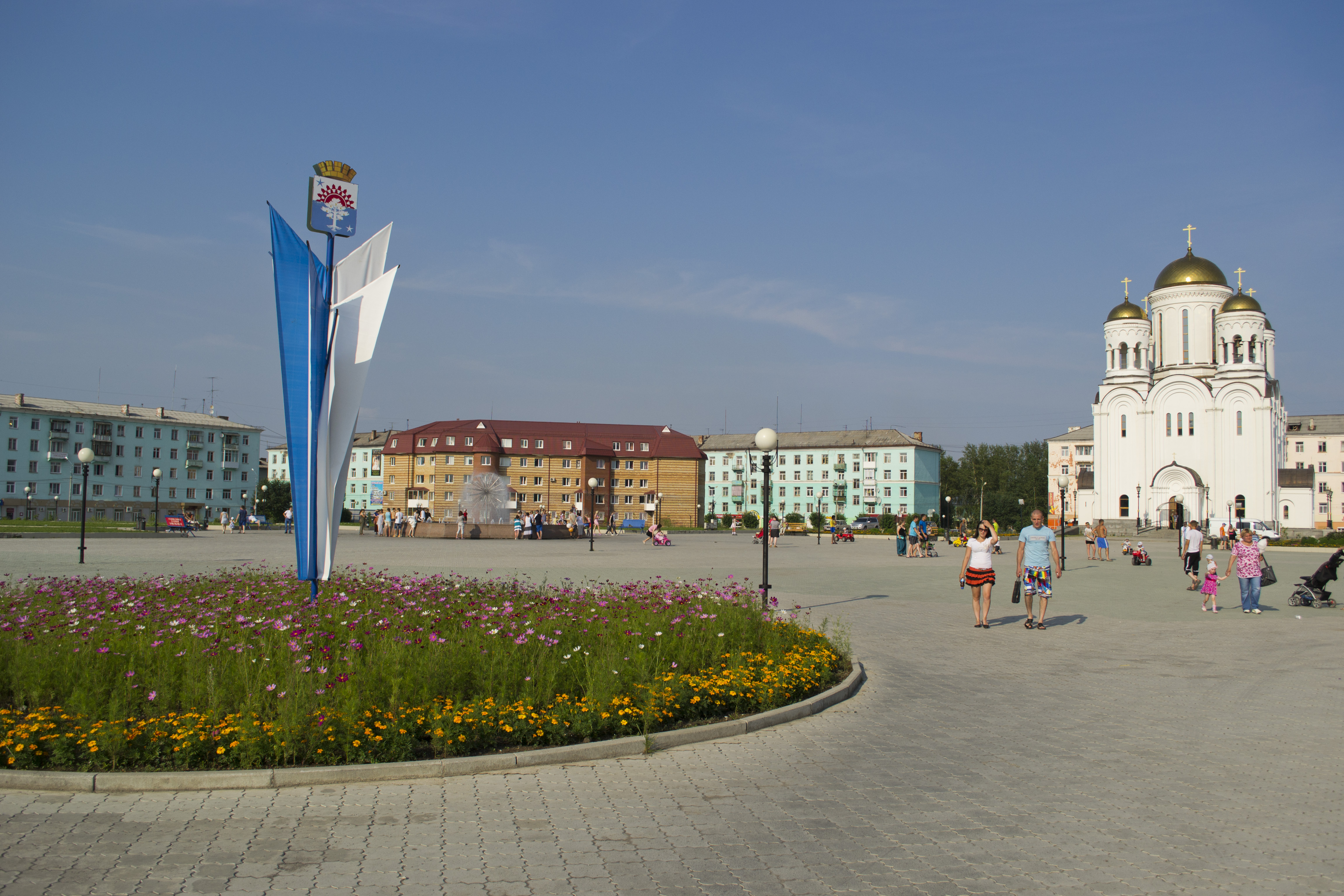
172. Serov

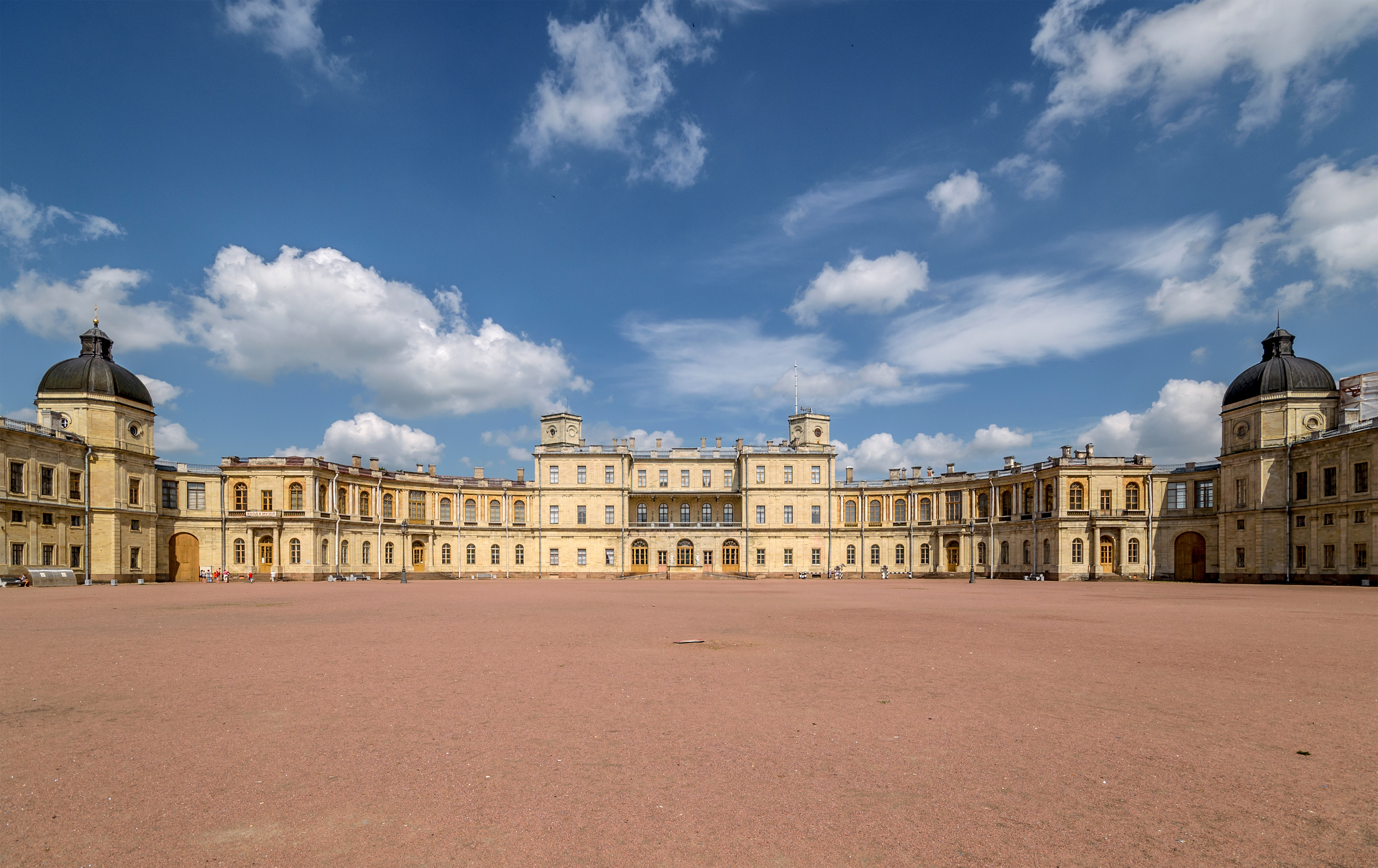
173. Gatchina

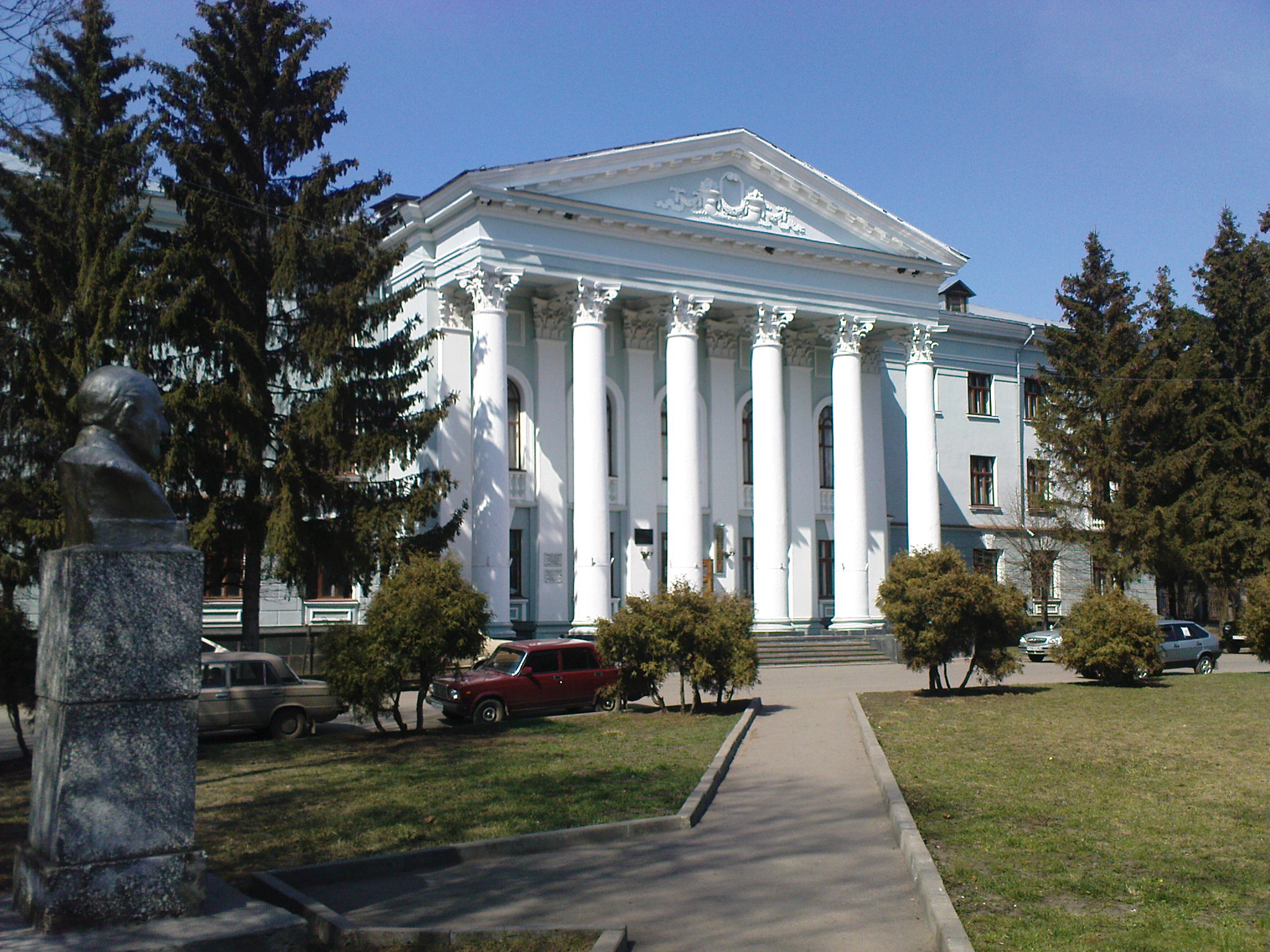
174. Michurinsk

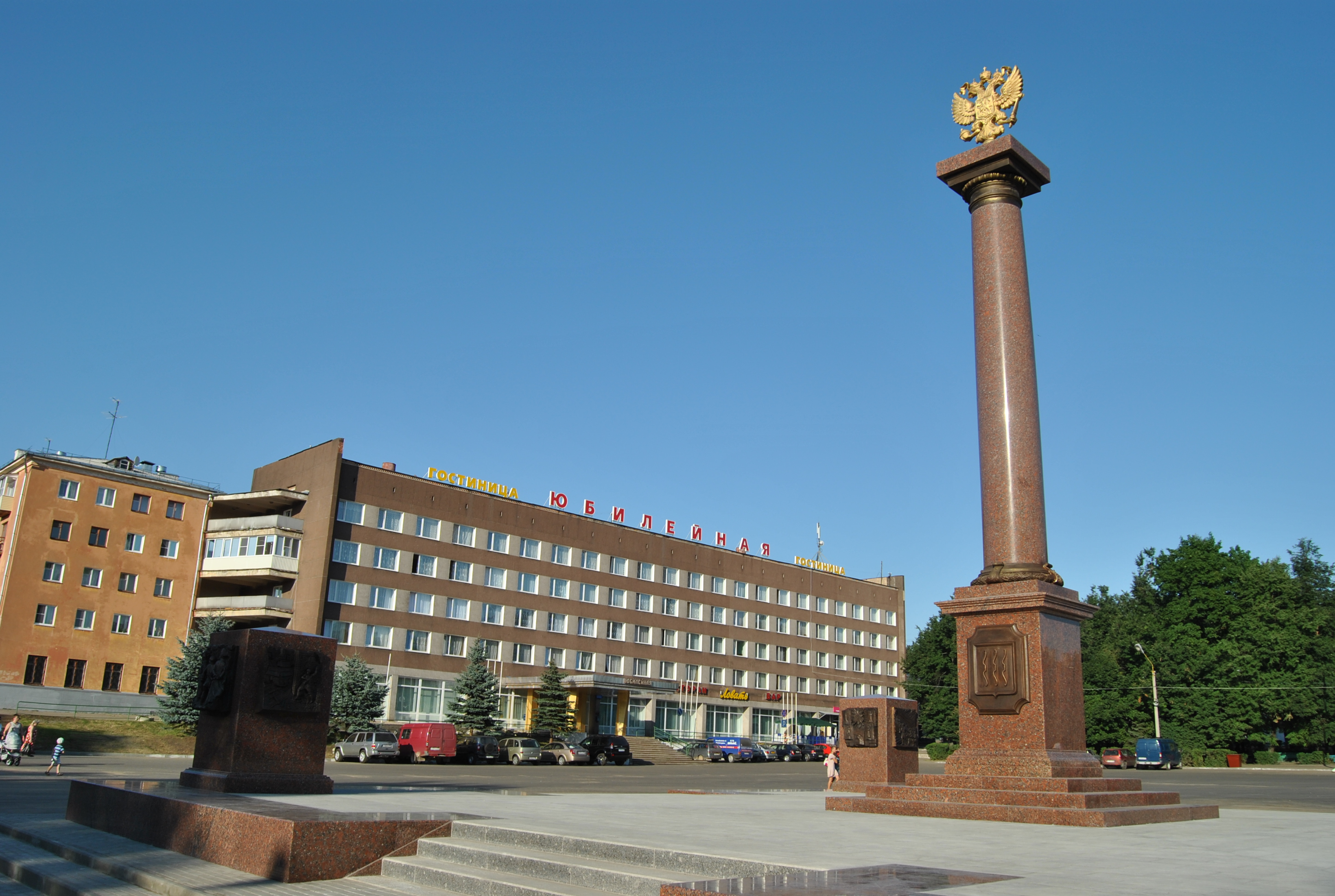
175. Velikiye Luki

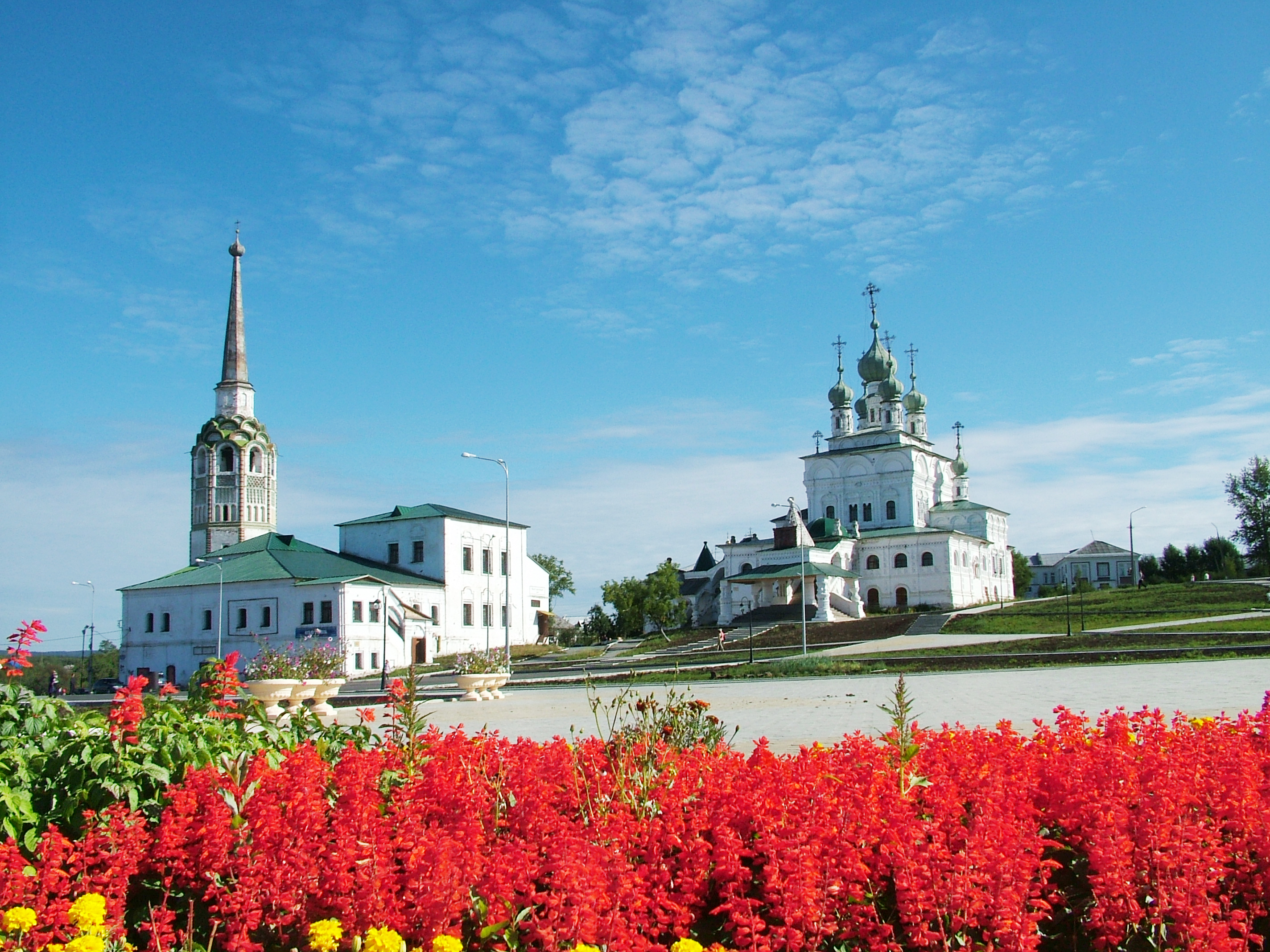
176. Solikamsk

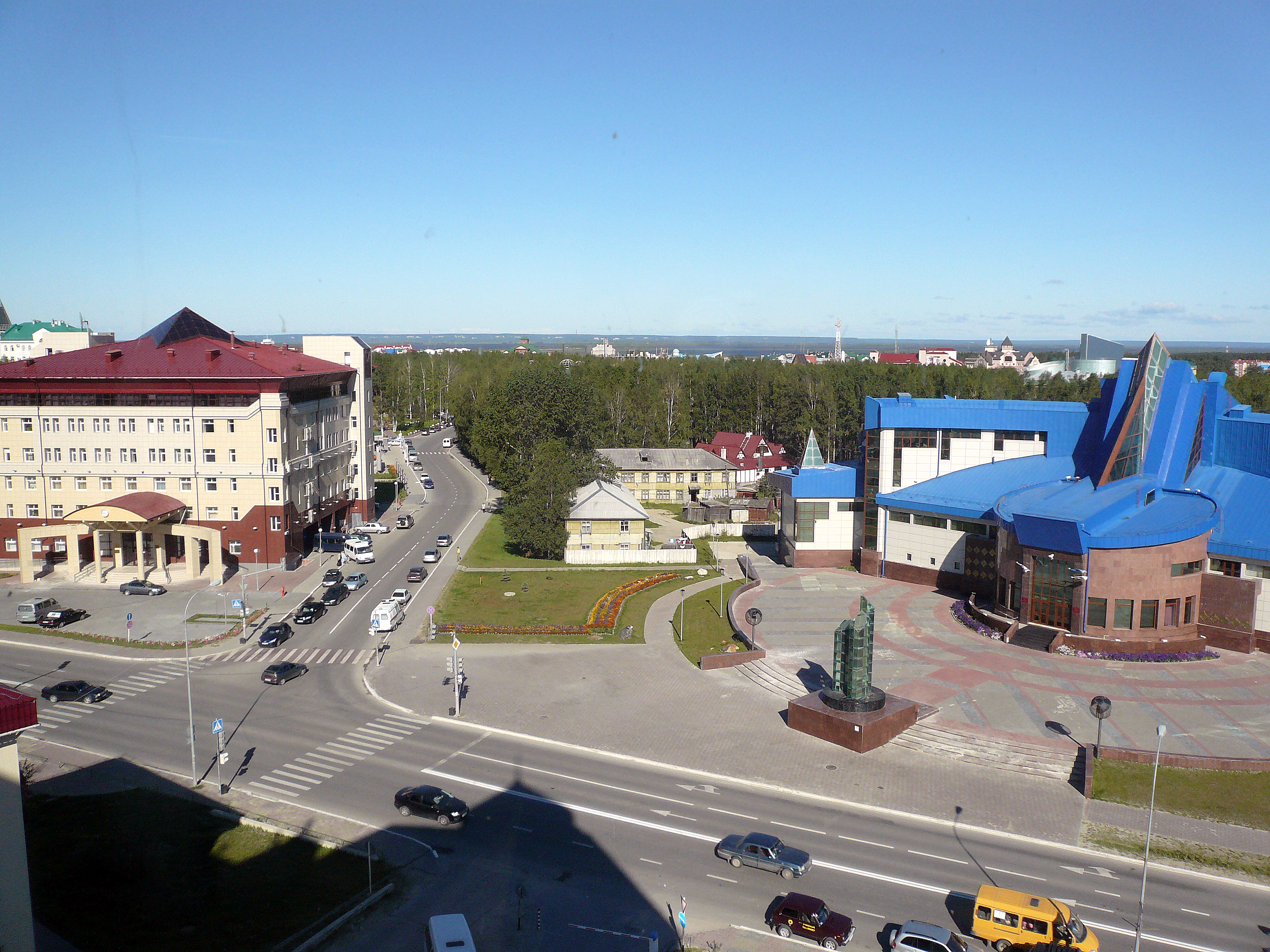
177. Khanty-Mansiysk

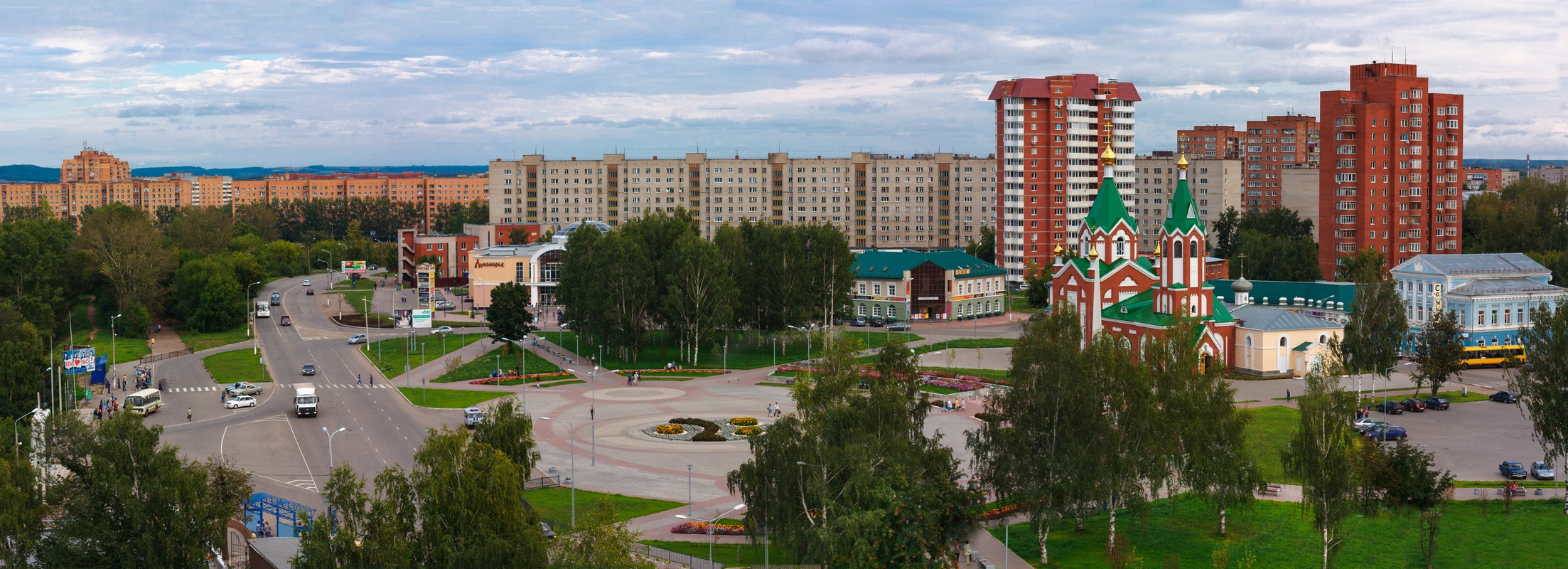
178. Glazov

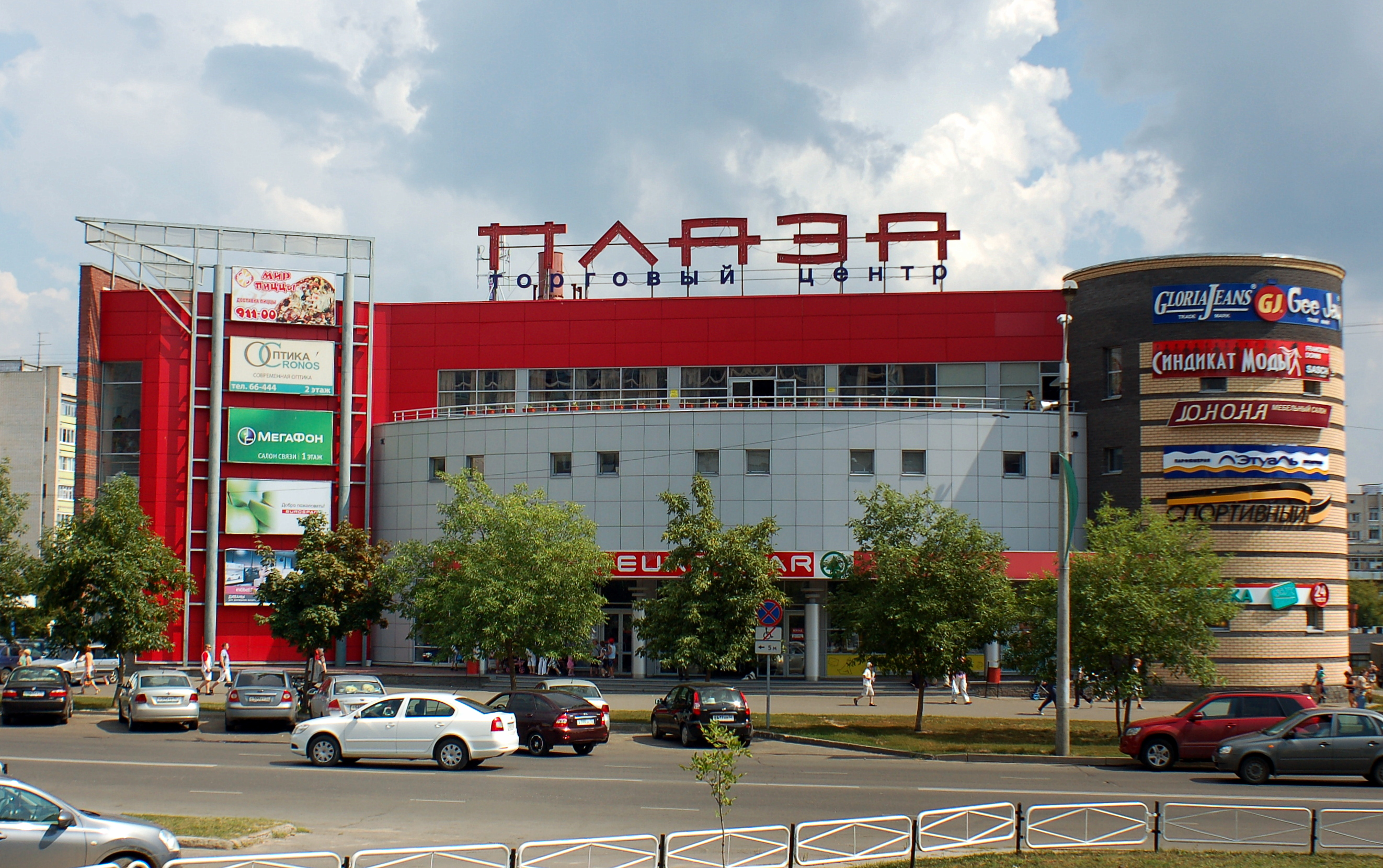
179. Sarov

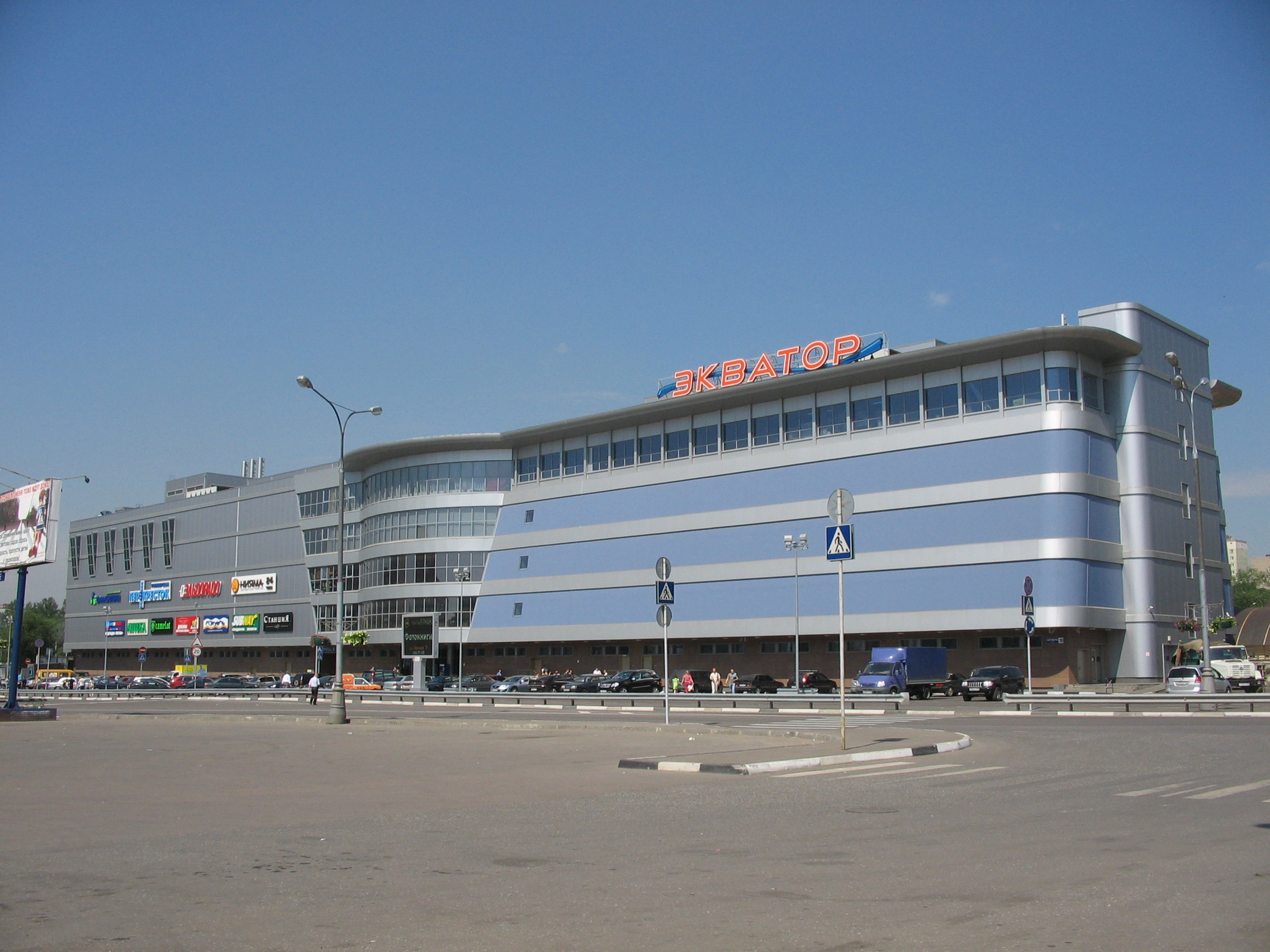
180. Reutov

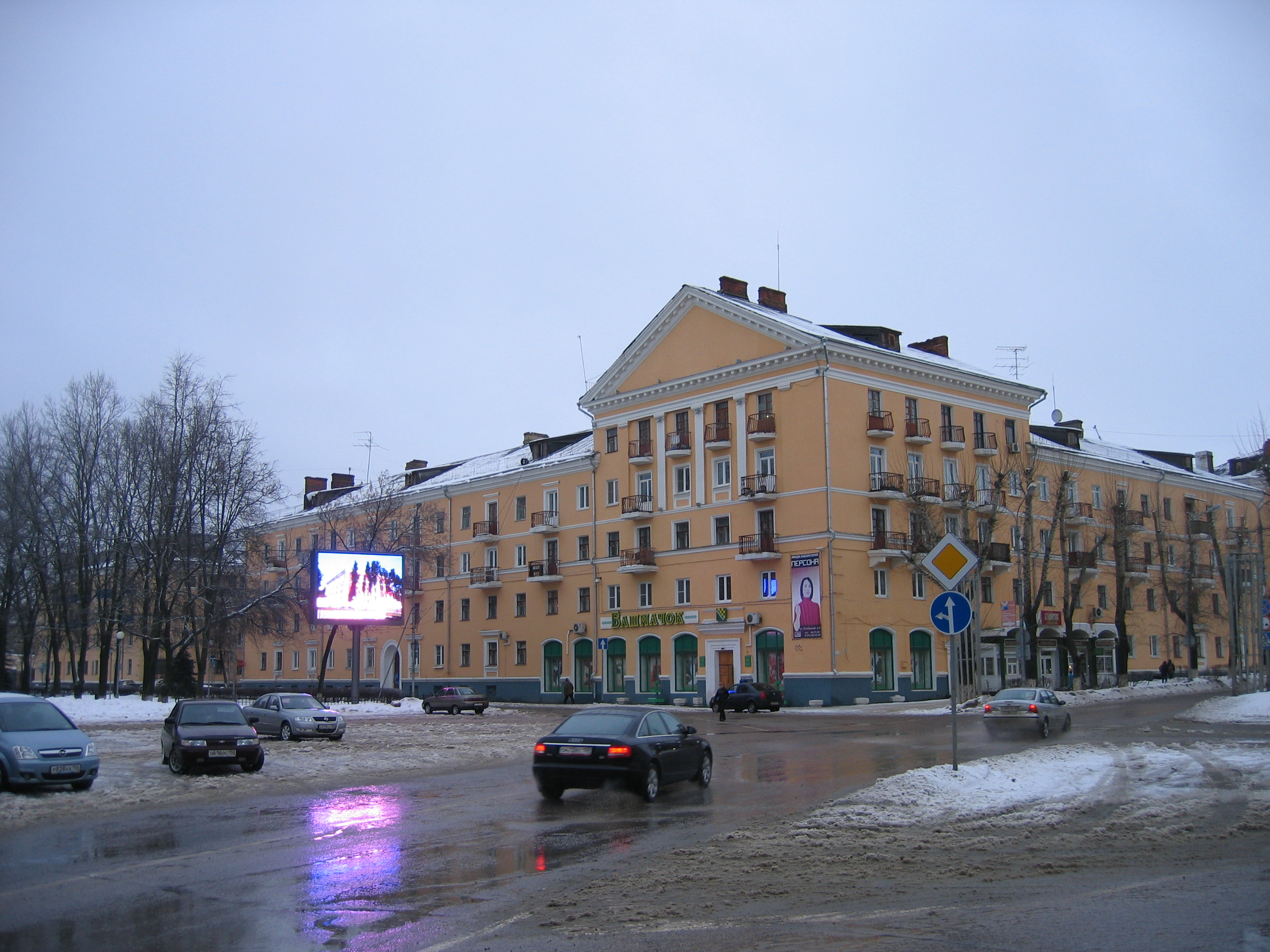
181. Voskresensk

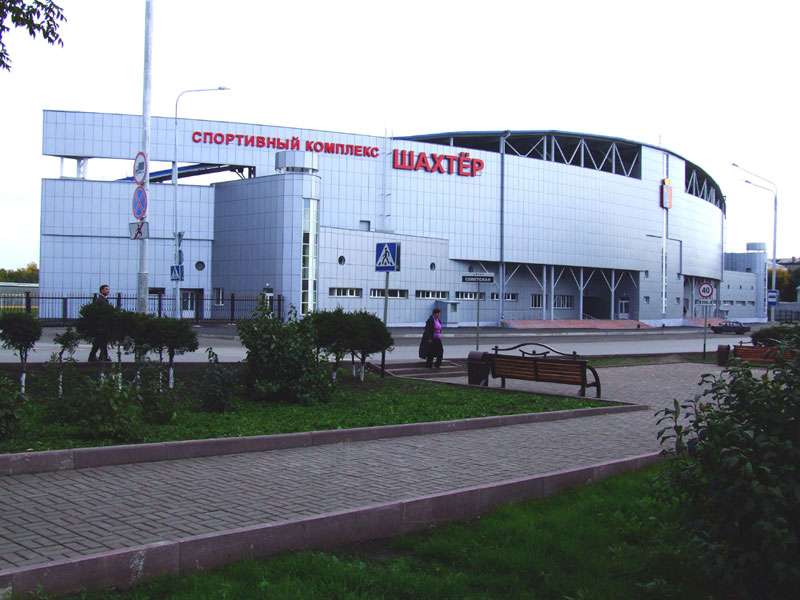
182. Kiselyovsk

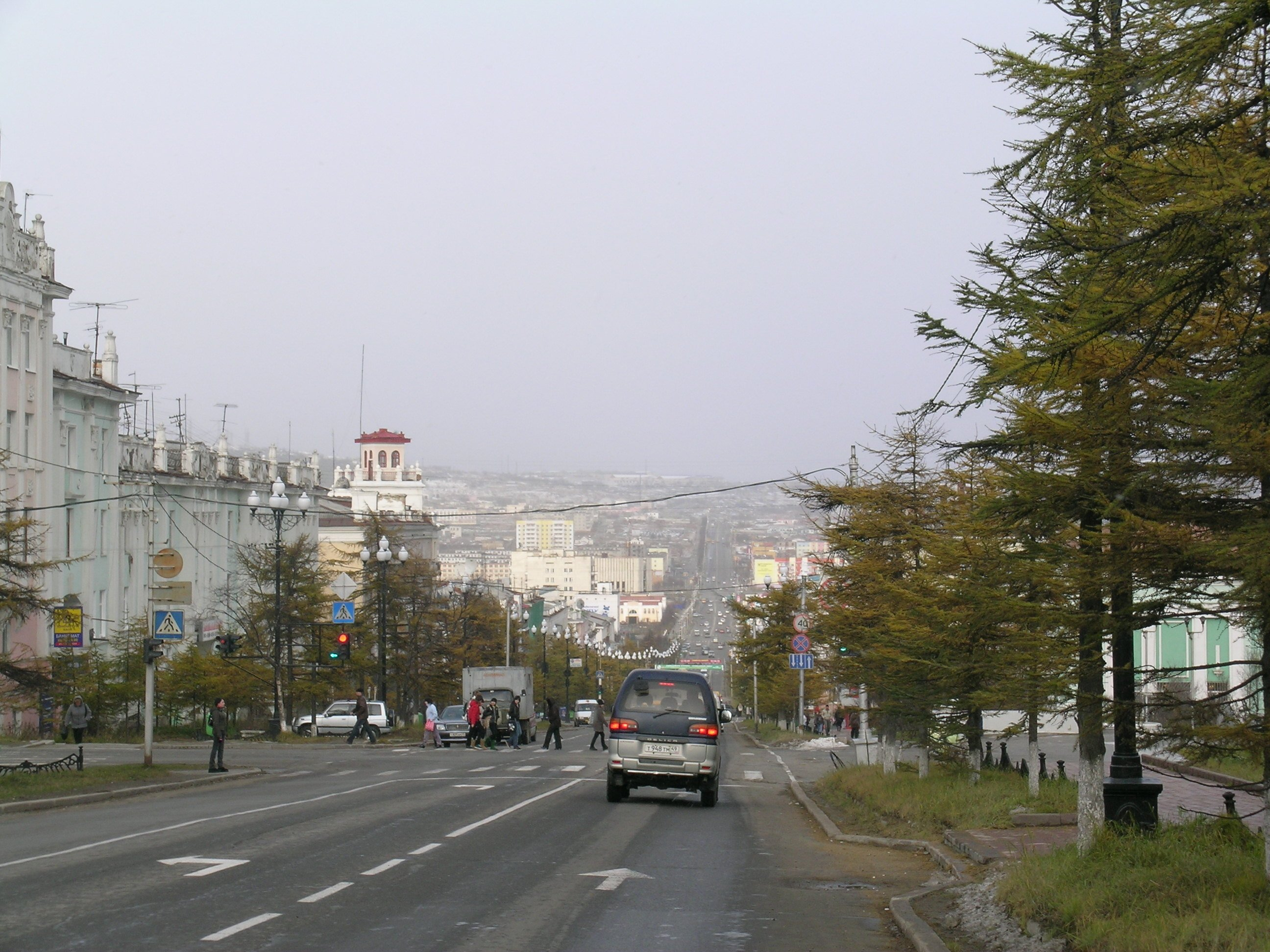
183. Magadan

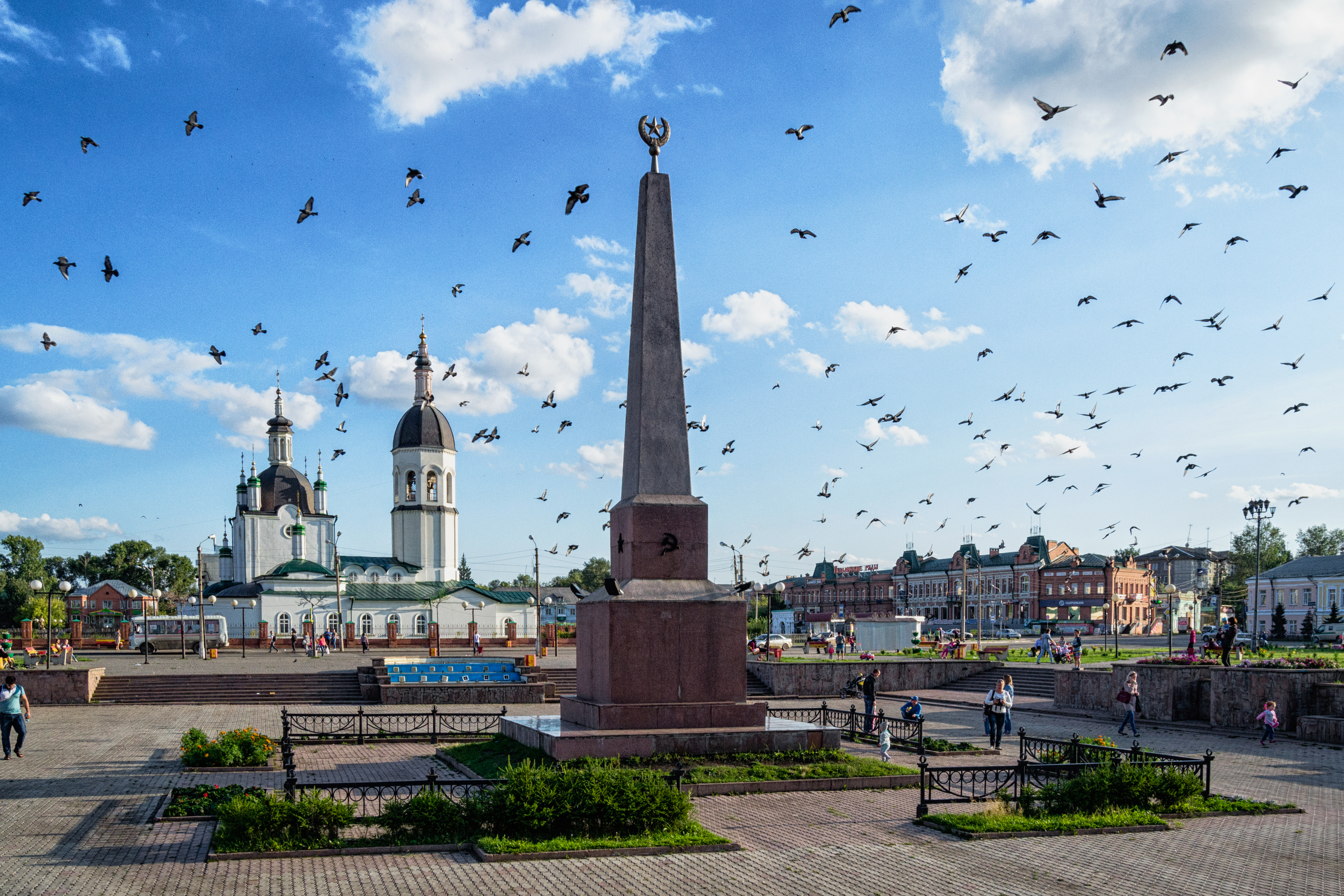
184. Kansk

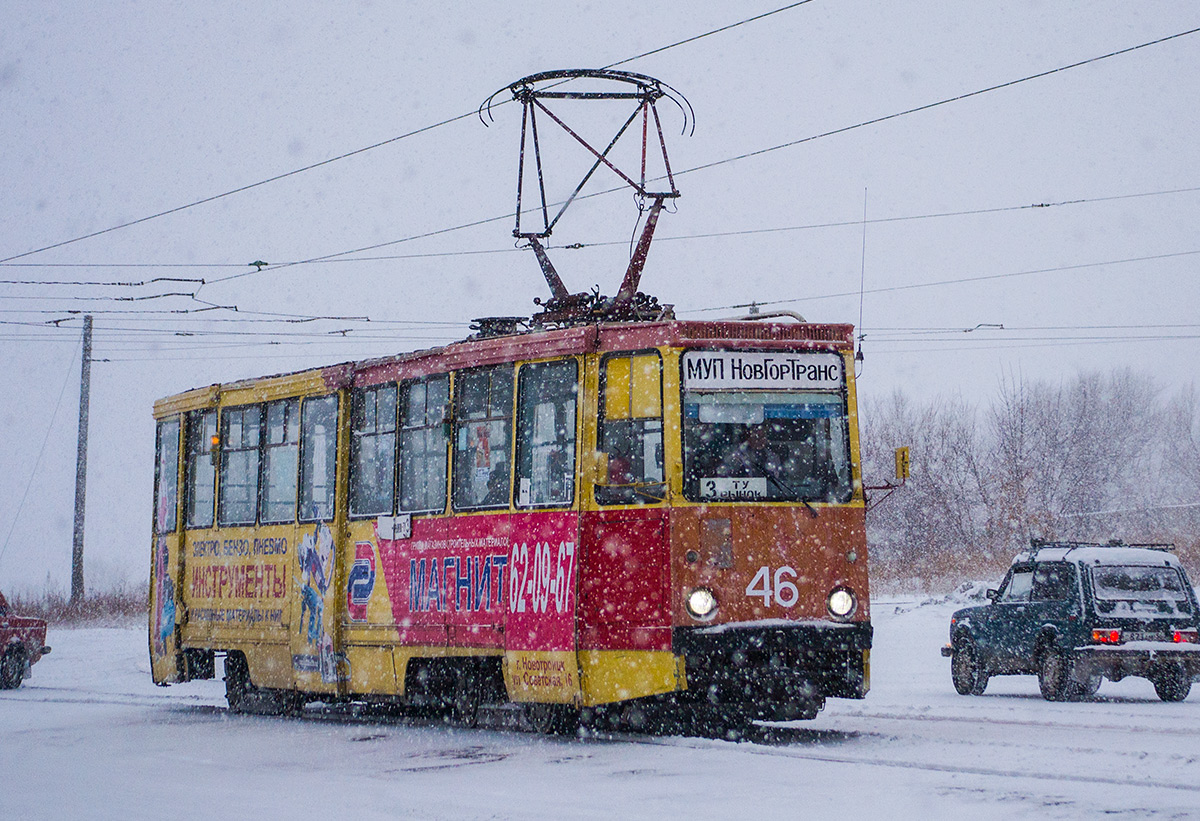
185. Novotroitsk

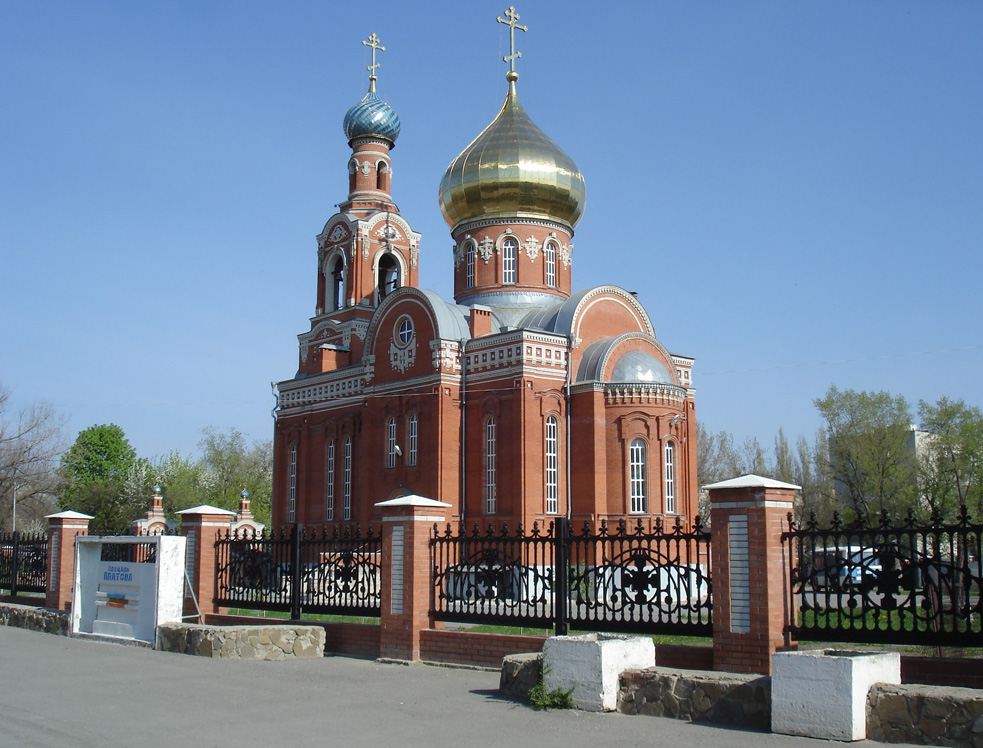
186. Kamensk-Shakhtinsky

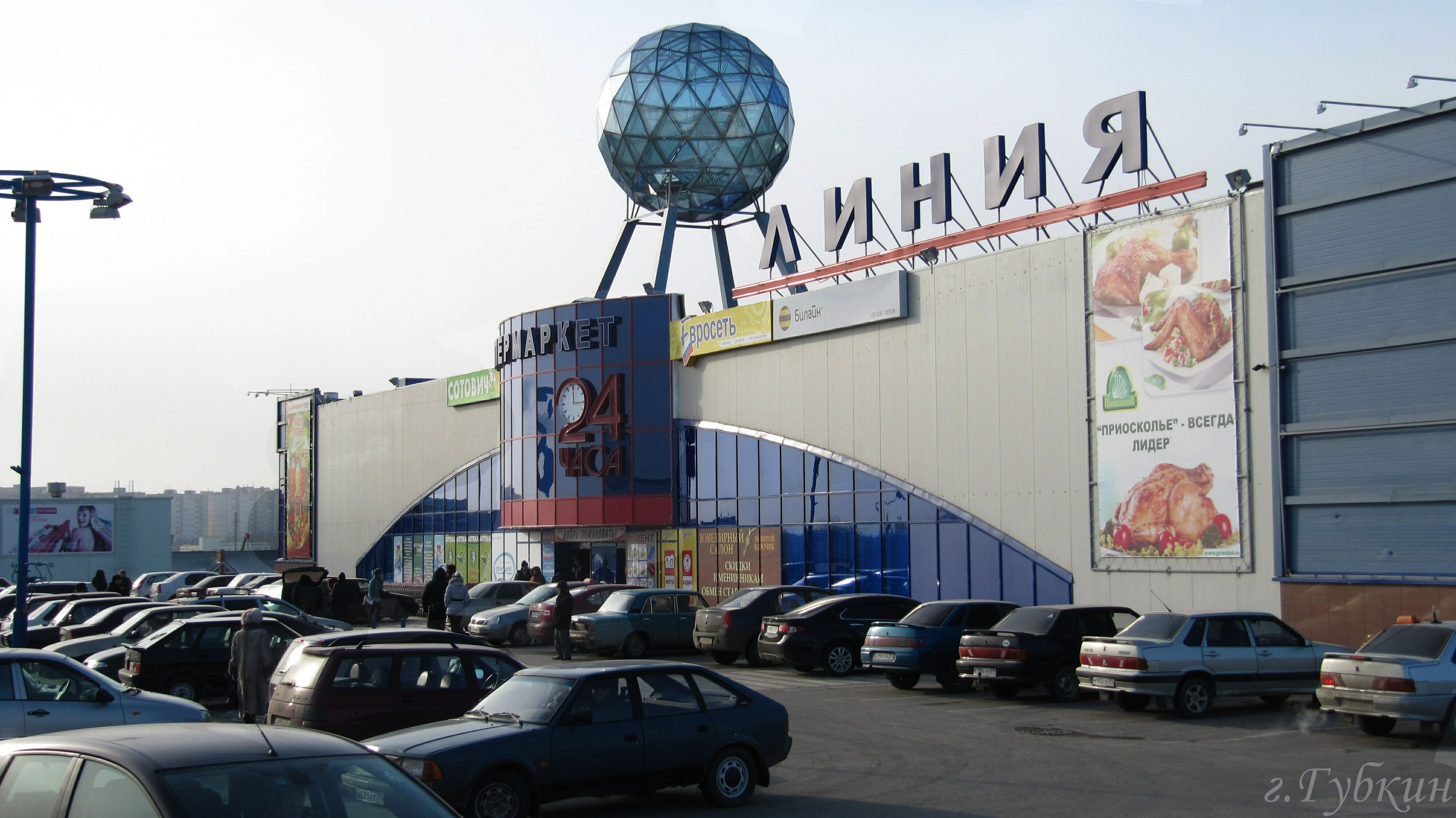
187. Gubkin

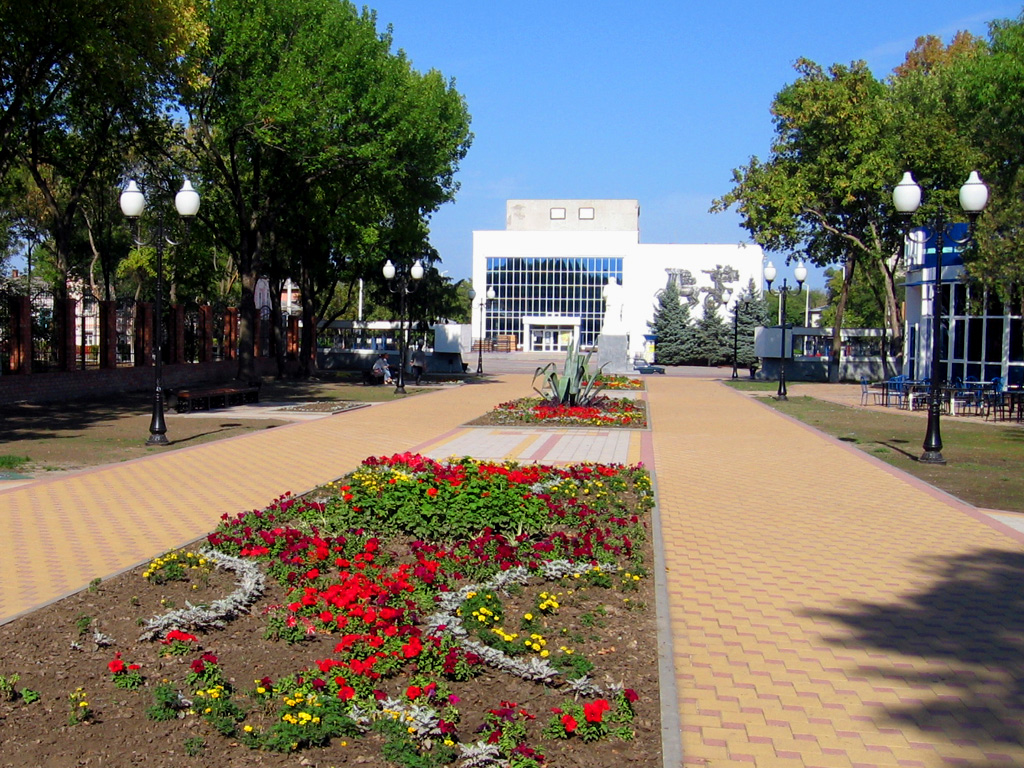
188. Yeysk

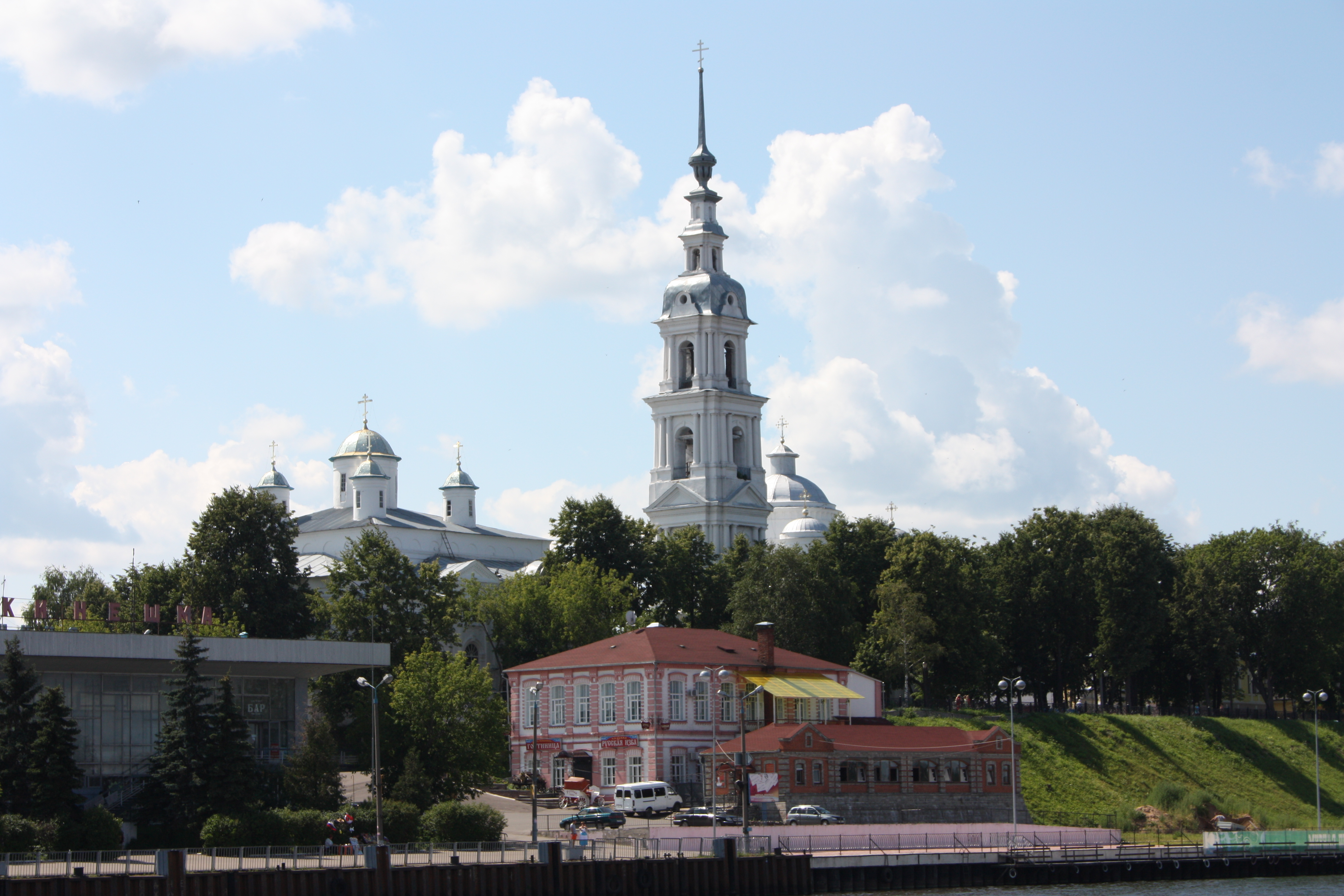
189. Kineshma

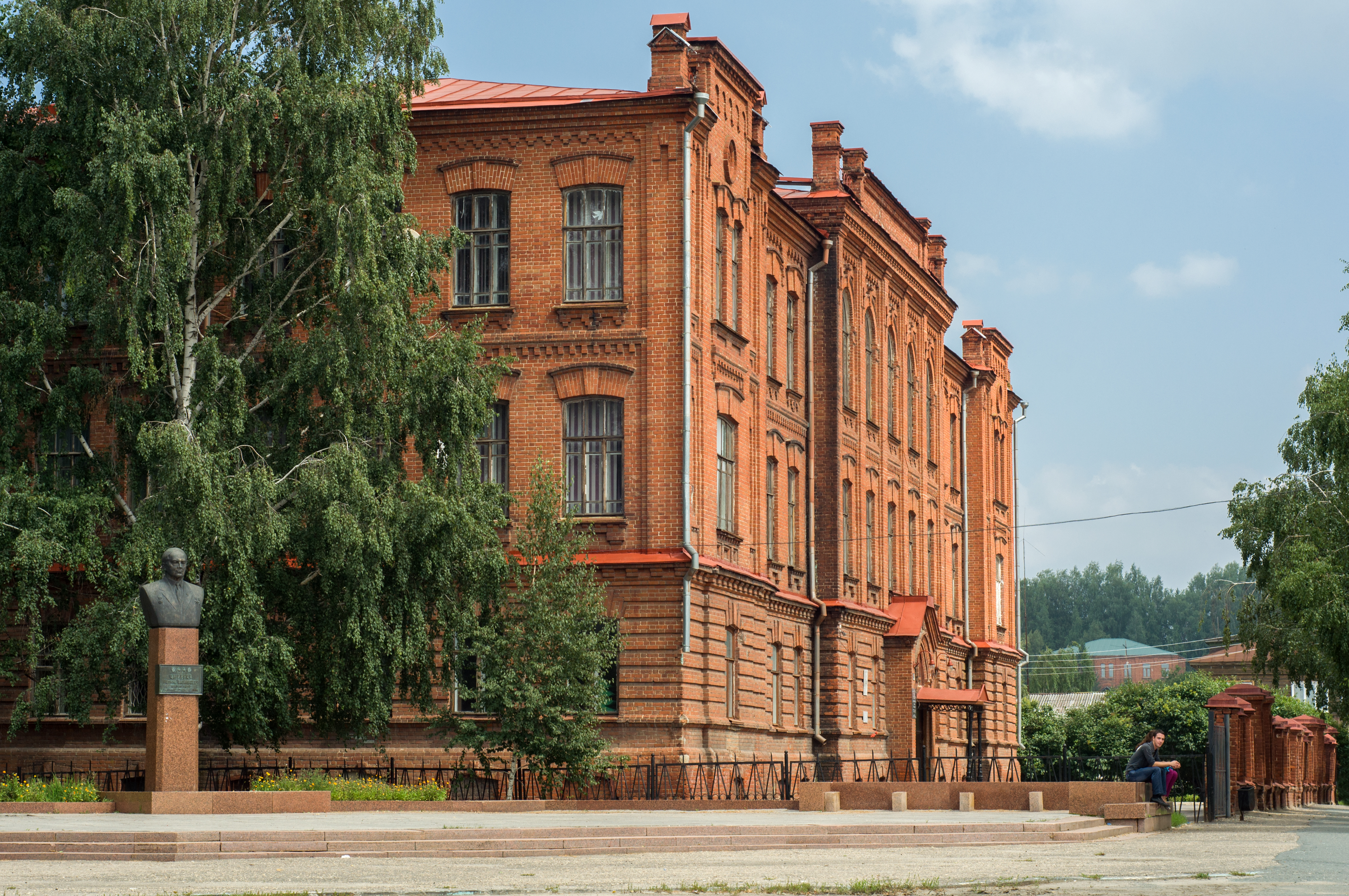
190. Kuznetsk

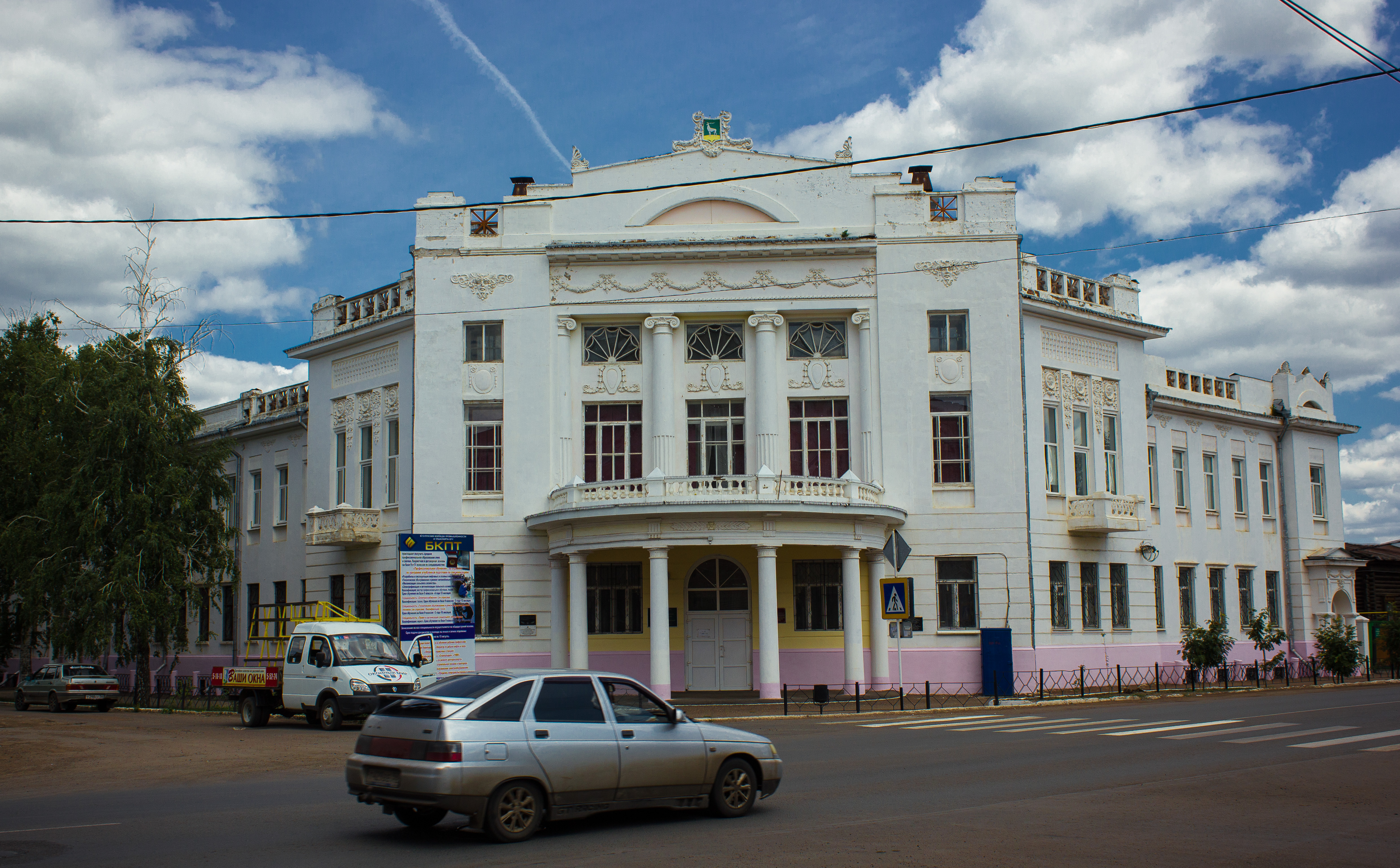
191. Buzuluk

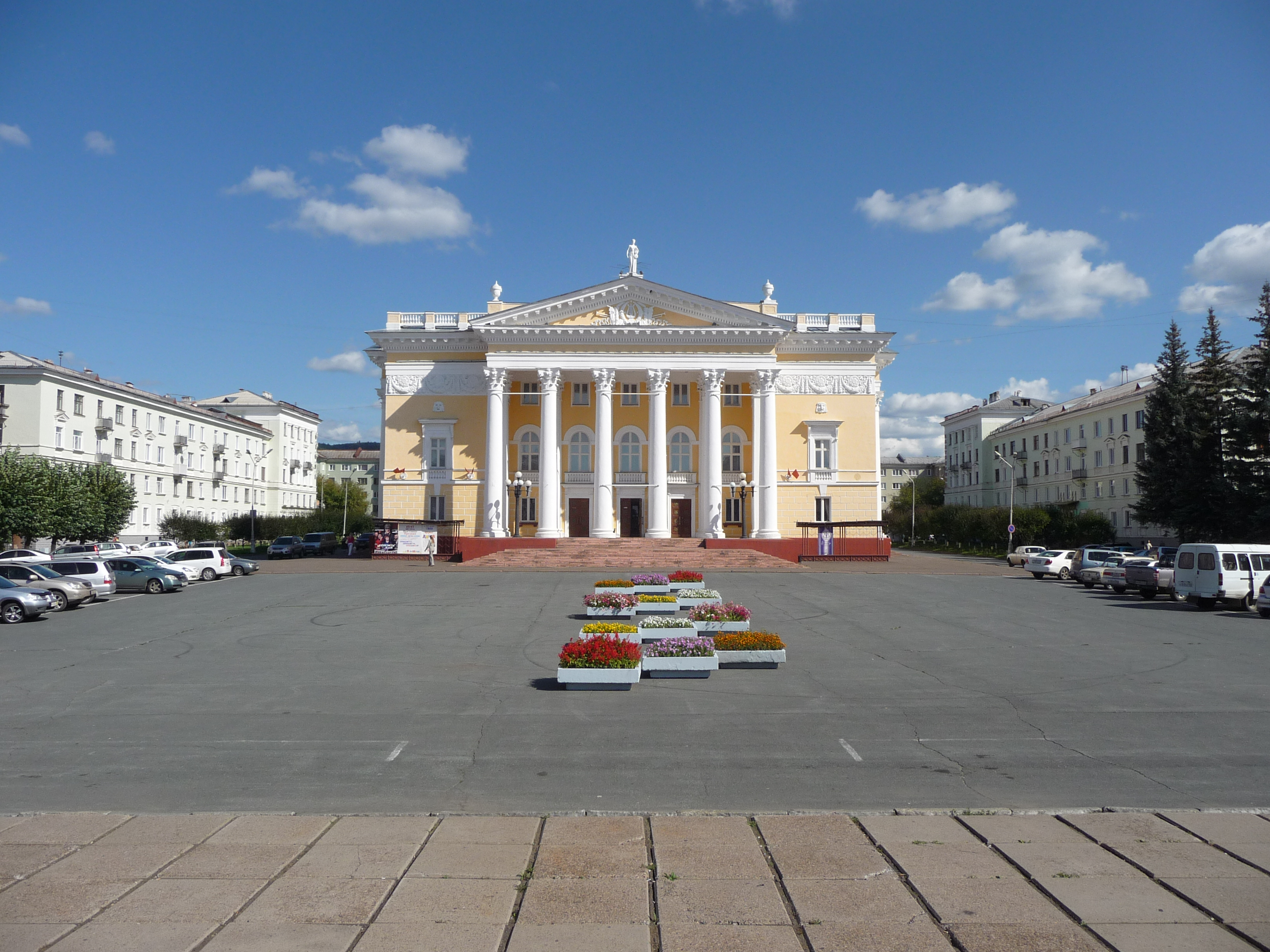
192. Zheleznogorsk

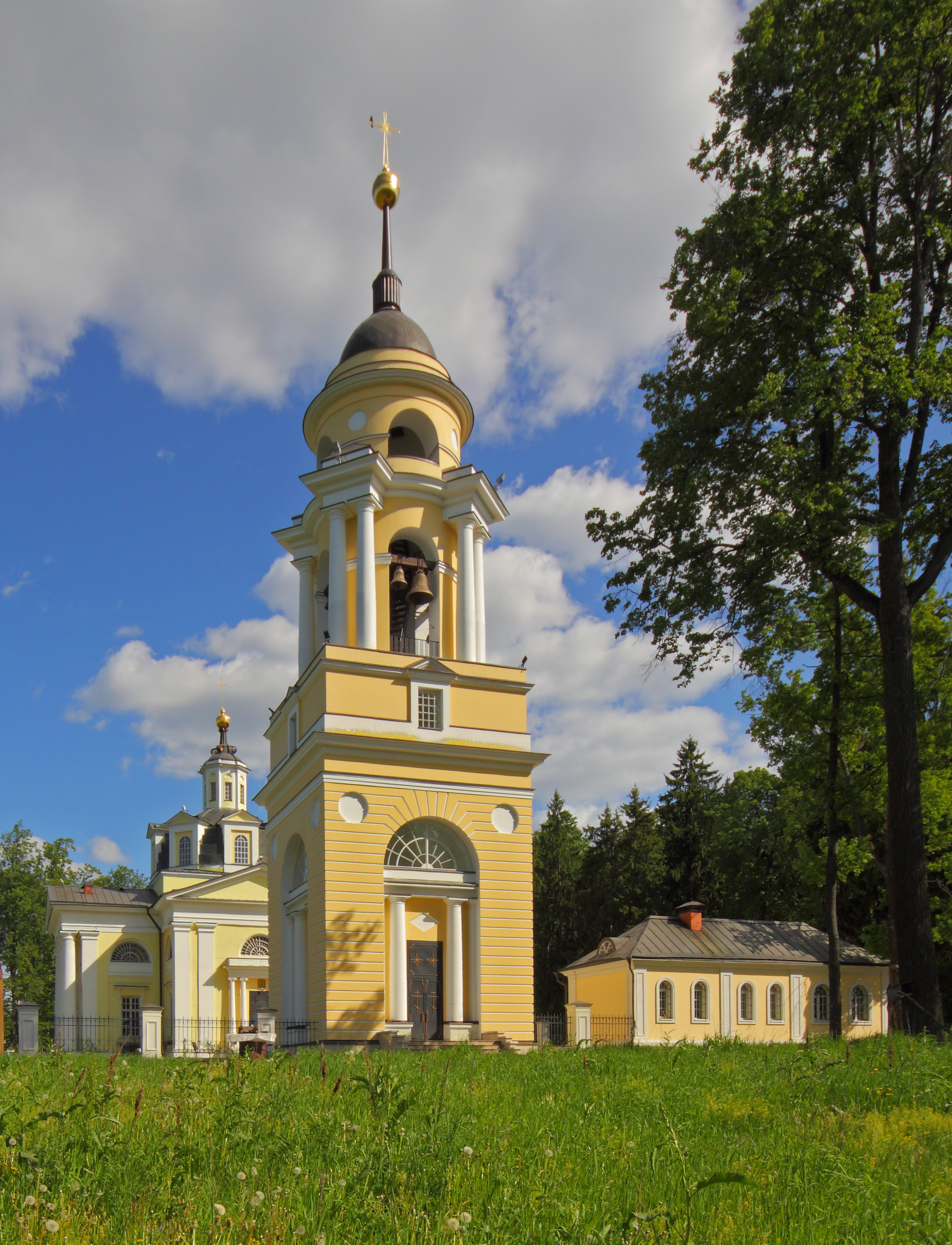
193. Lobnya

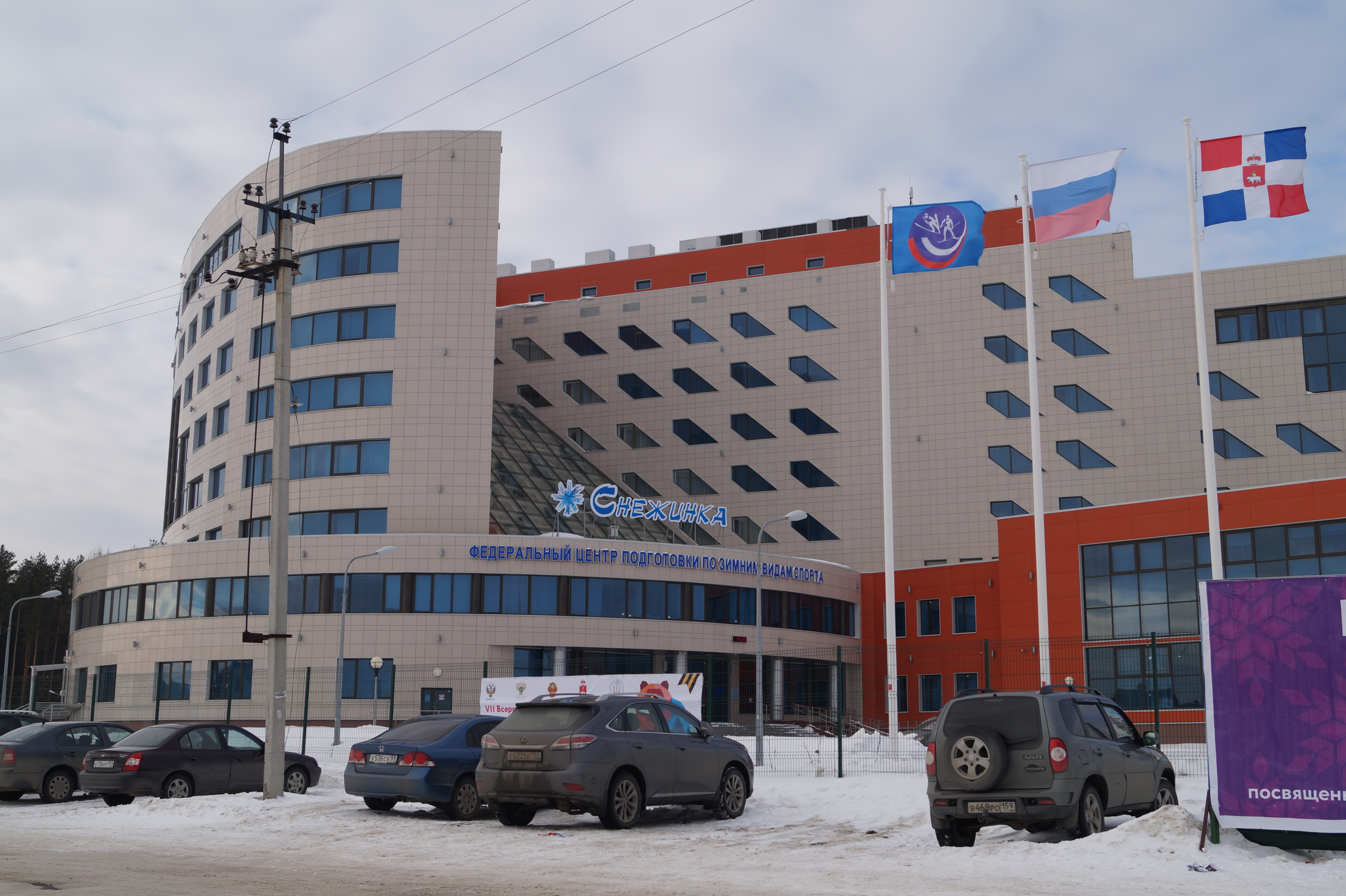
194. Chaykovsky

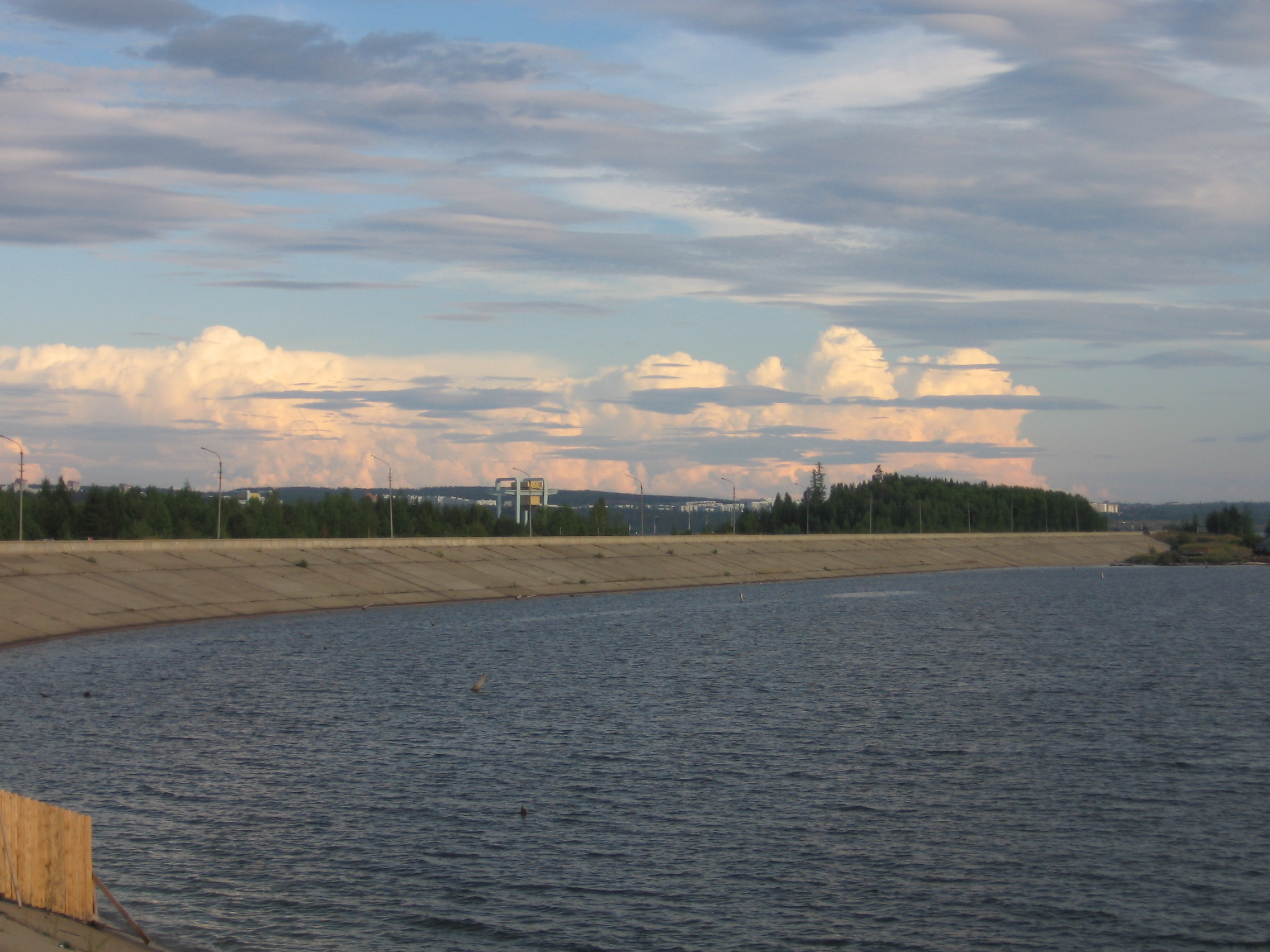
195. Ust-Ilimsk

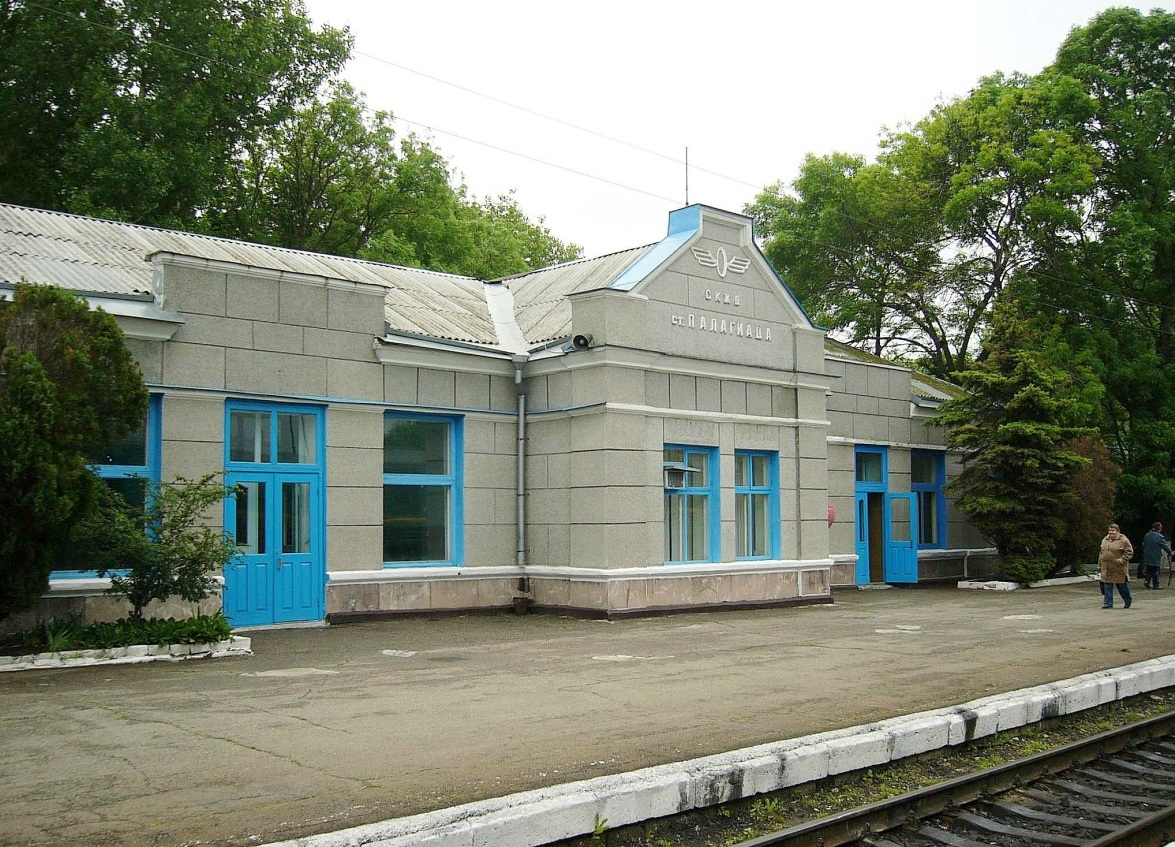
196. Mikhaylovsk

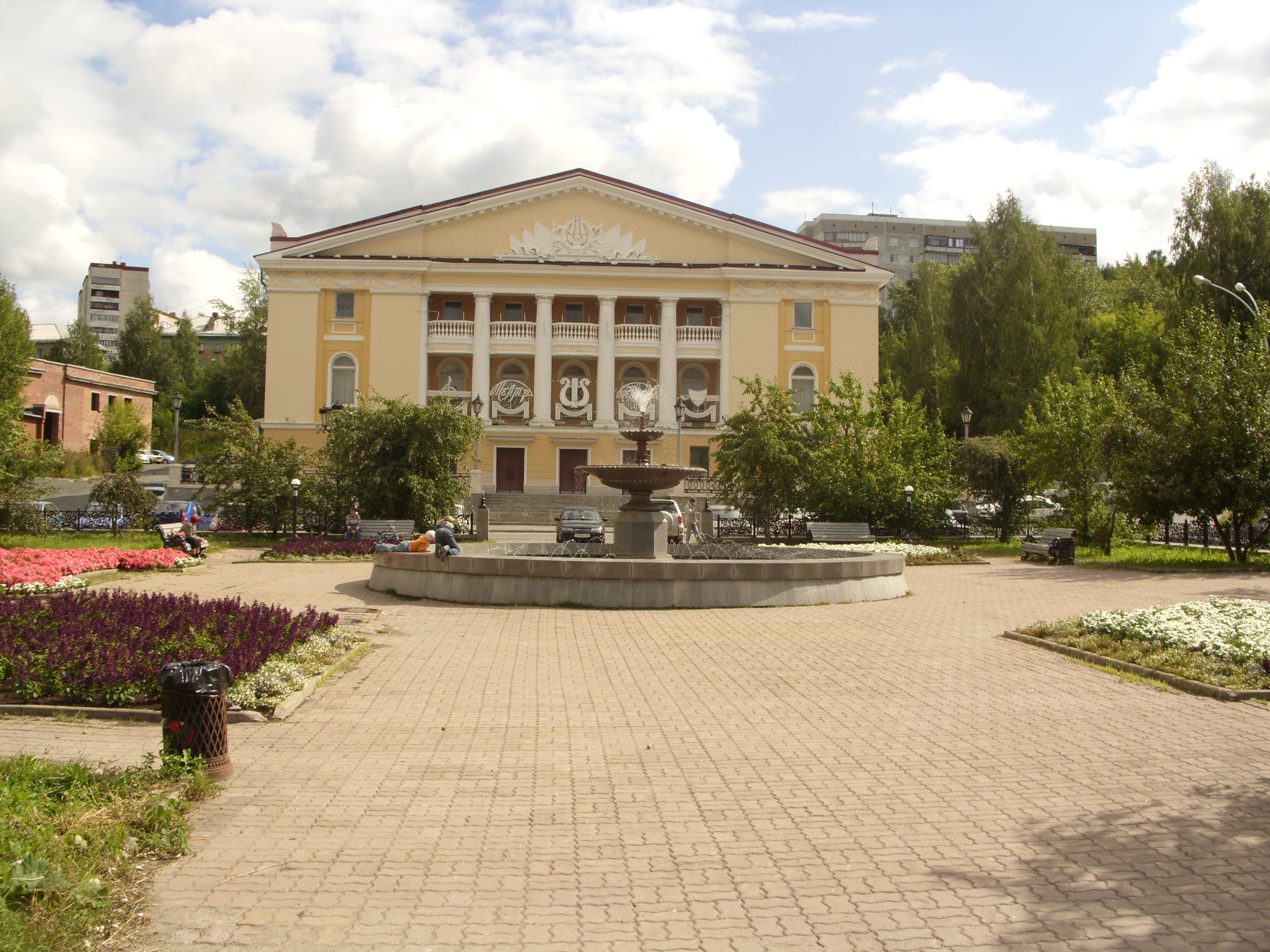
197. Novouralsk

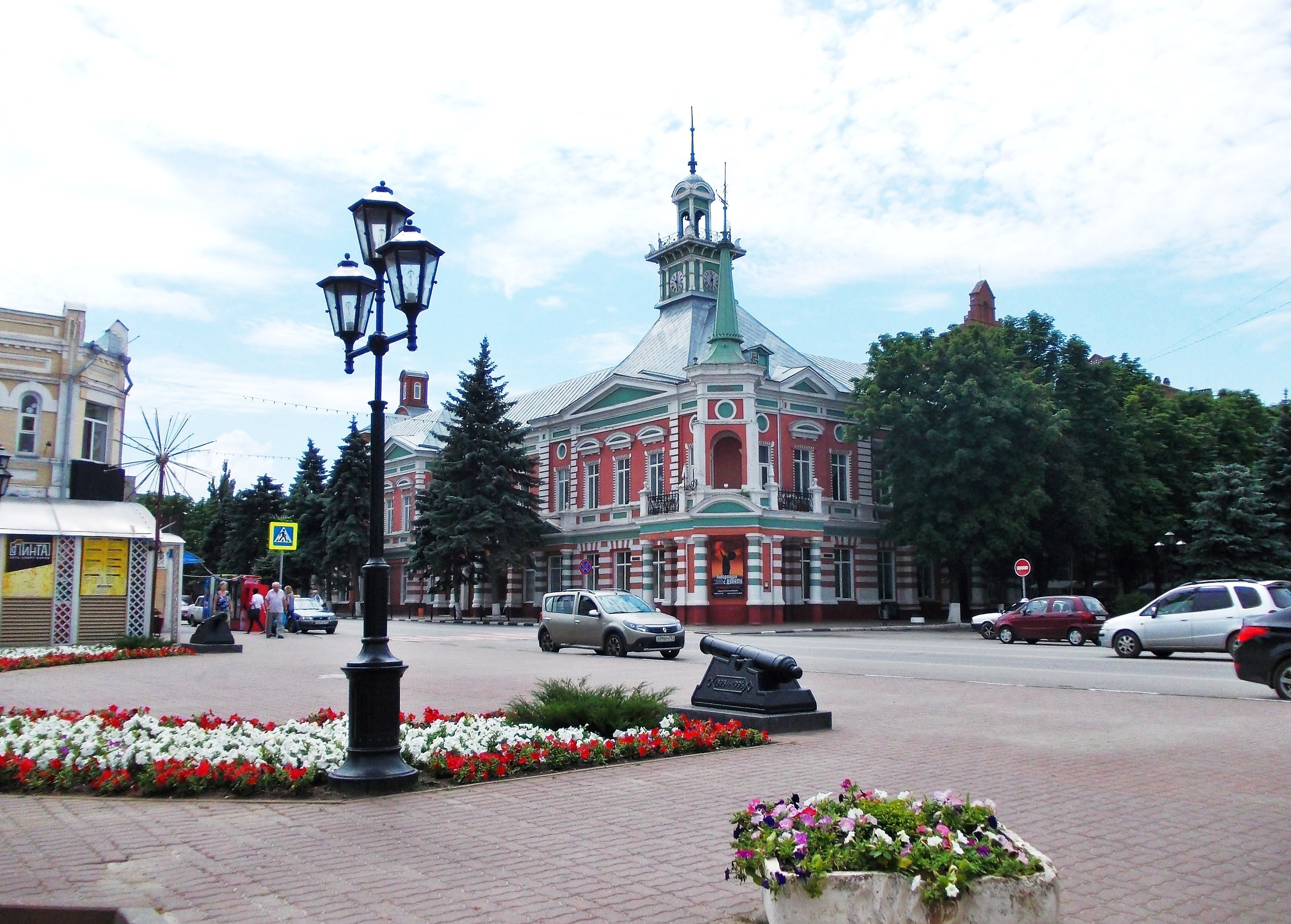
198. Azov

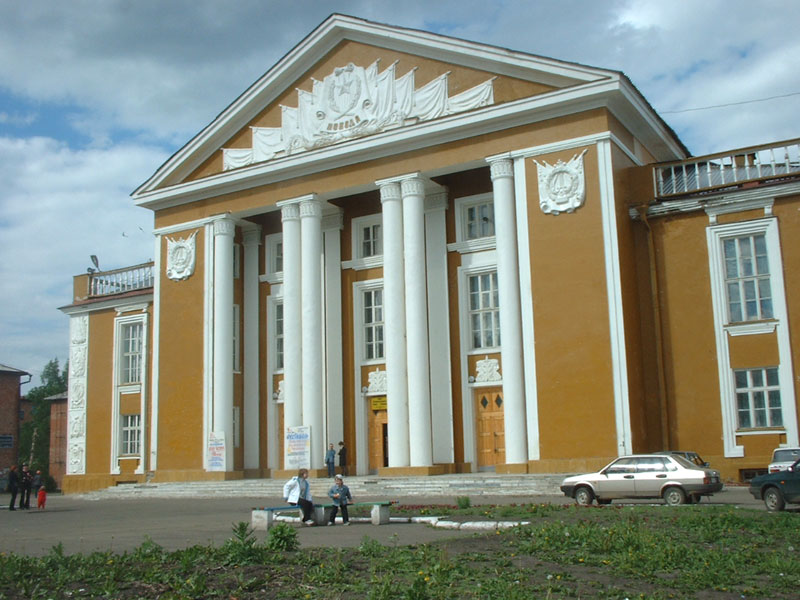
199. Yurga

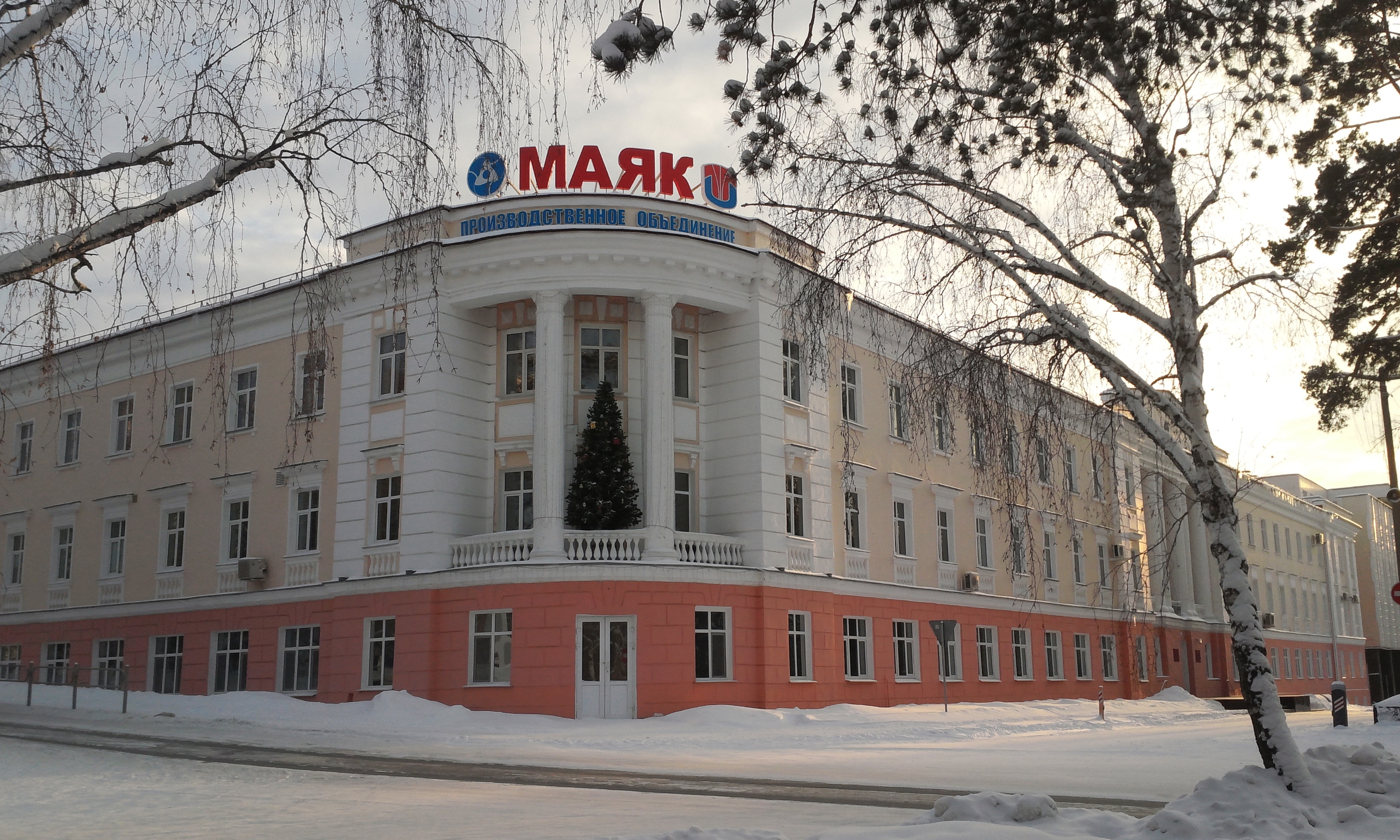
200. Ozyorsk

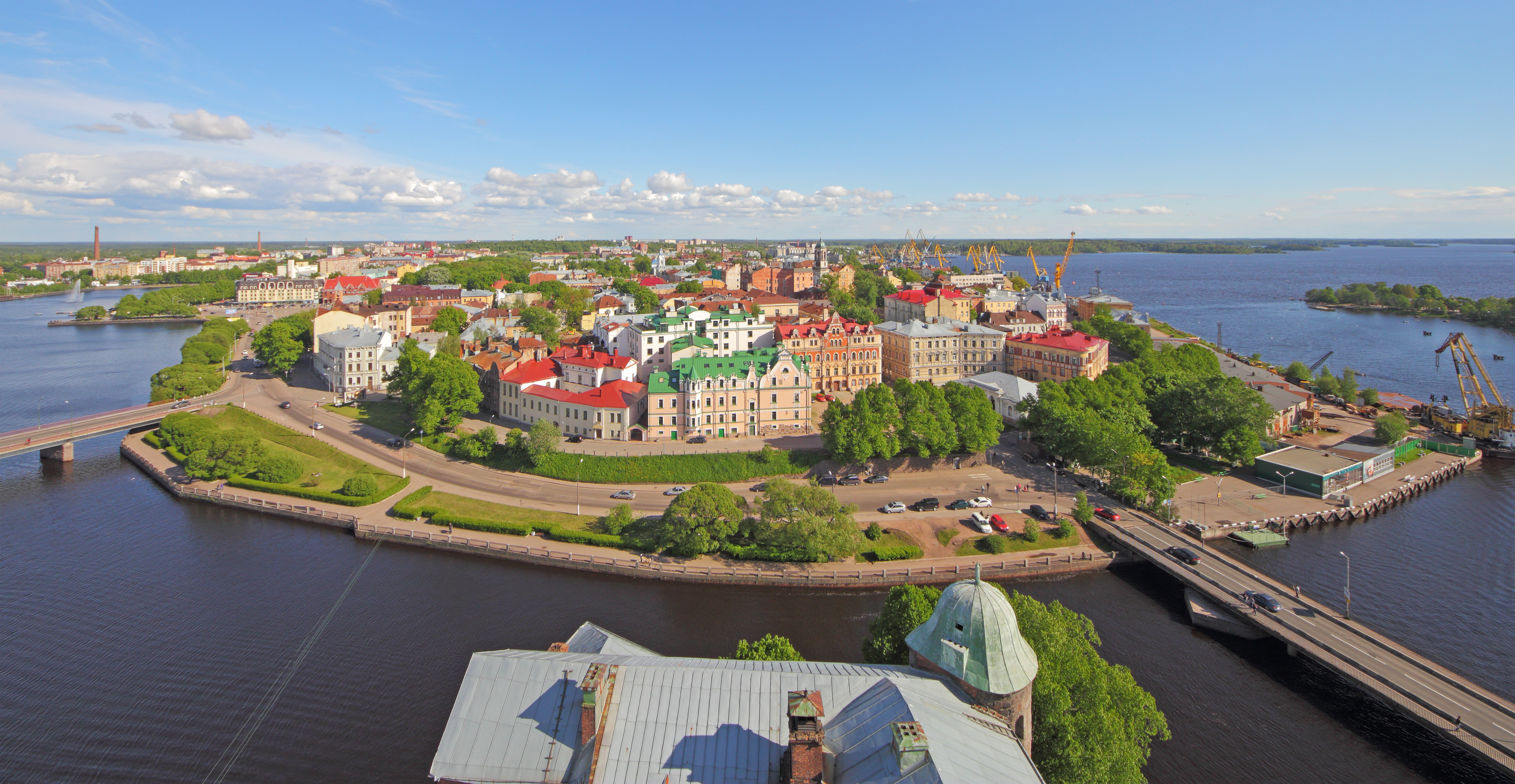
201. Vyborg

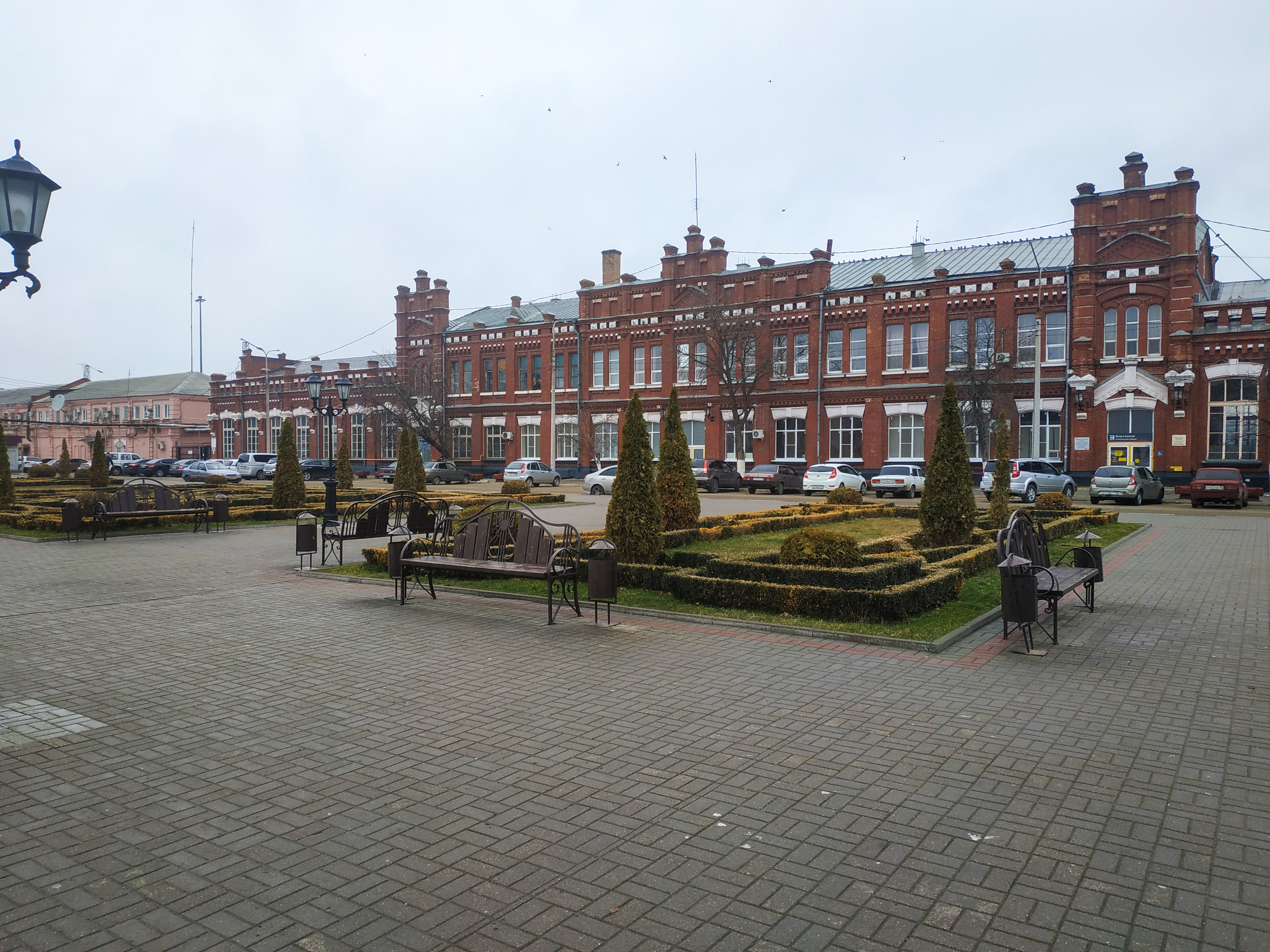
202. Kropotkin

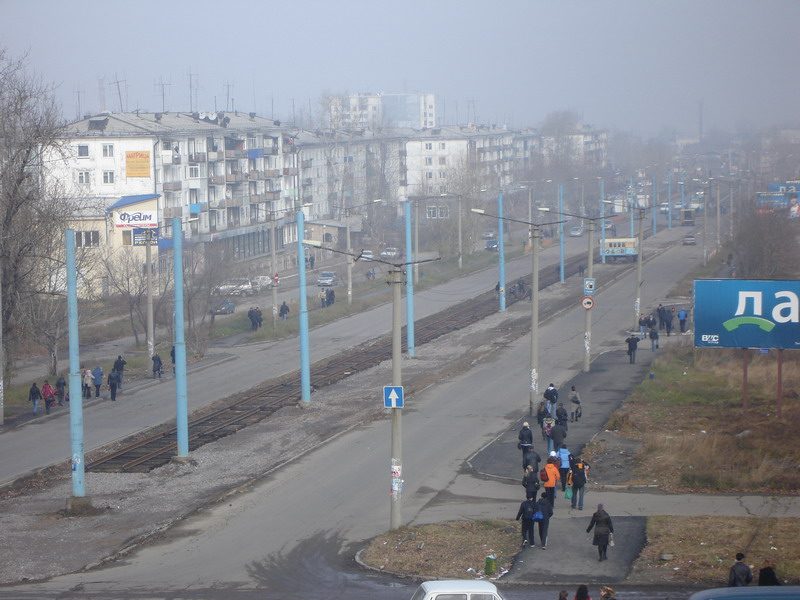
203. Usolye-Sibirskoye

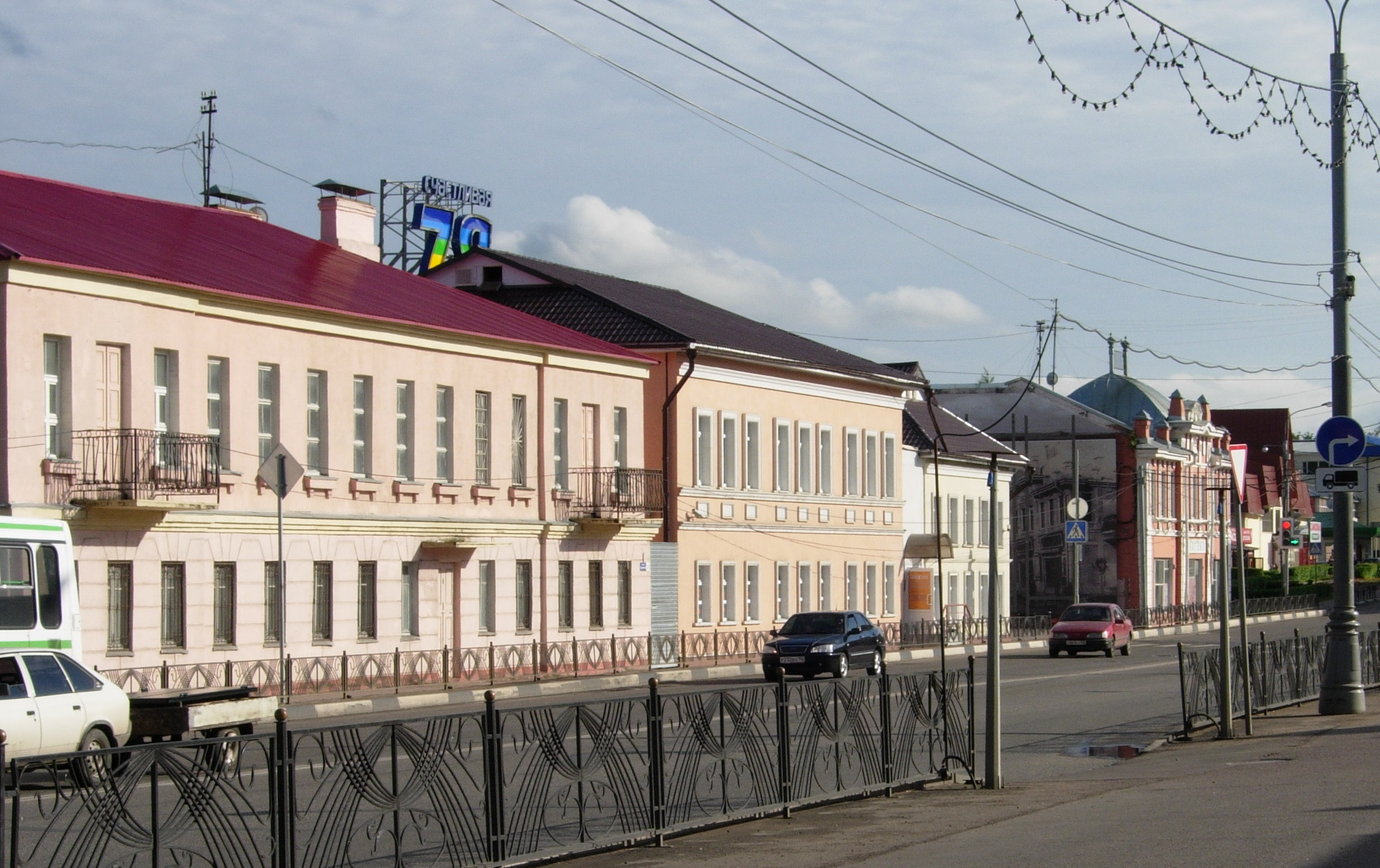
204. Klin

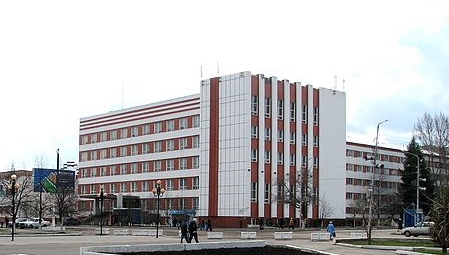
205. Balashov

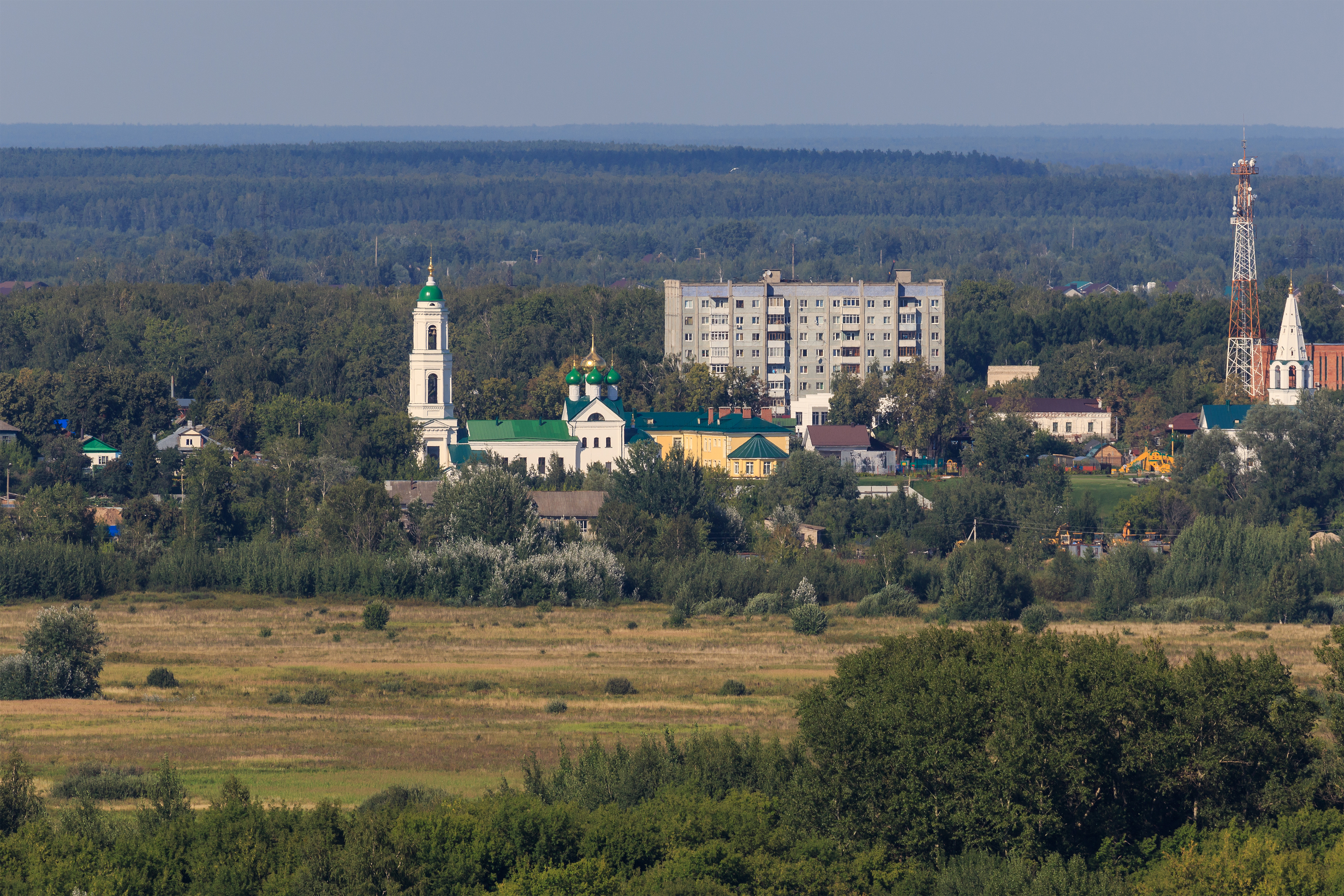
206. Bor

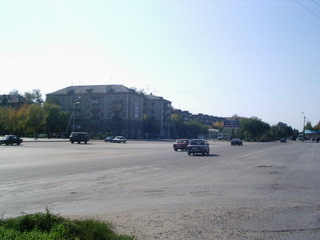
207. Shadrinsk

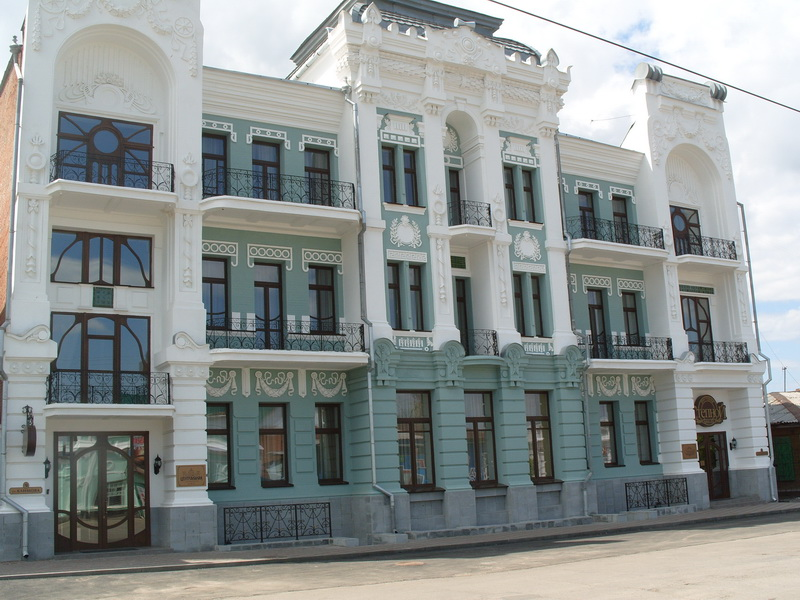
208. Troitsk

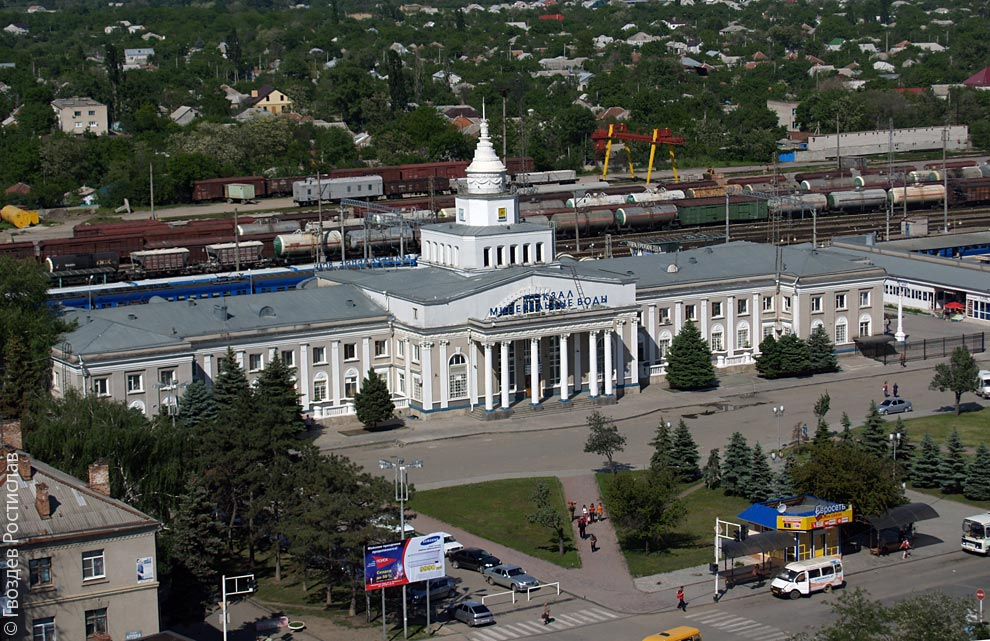
209. Mineralnye Vody

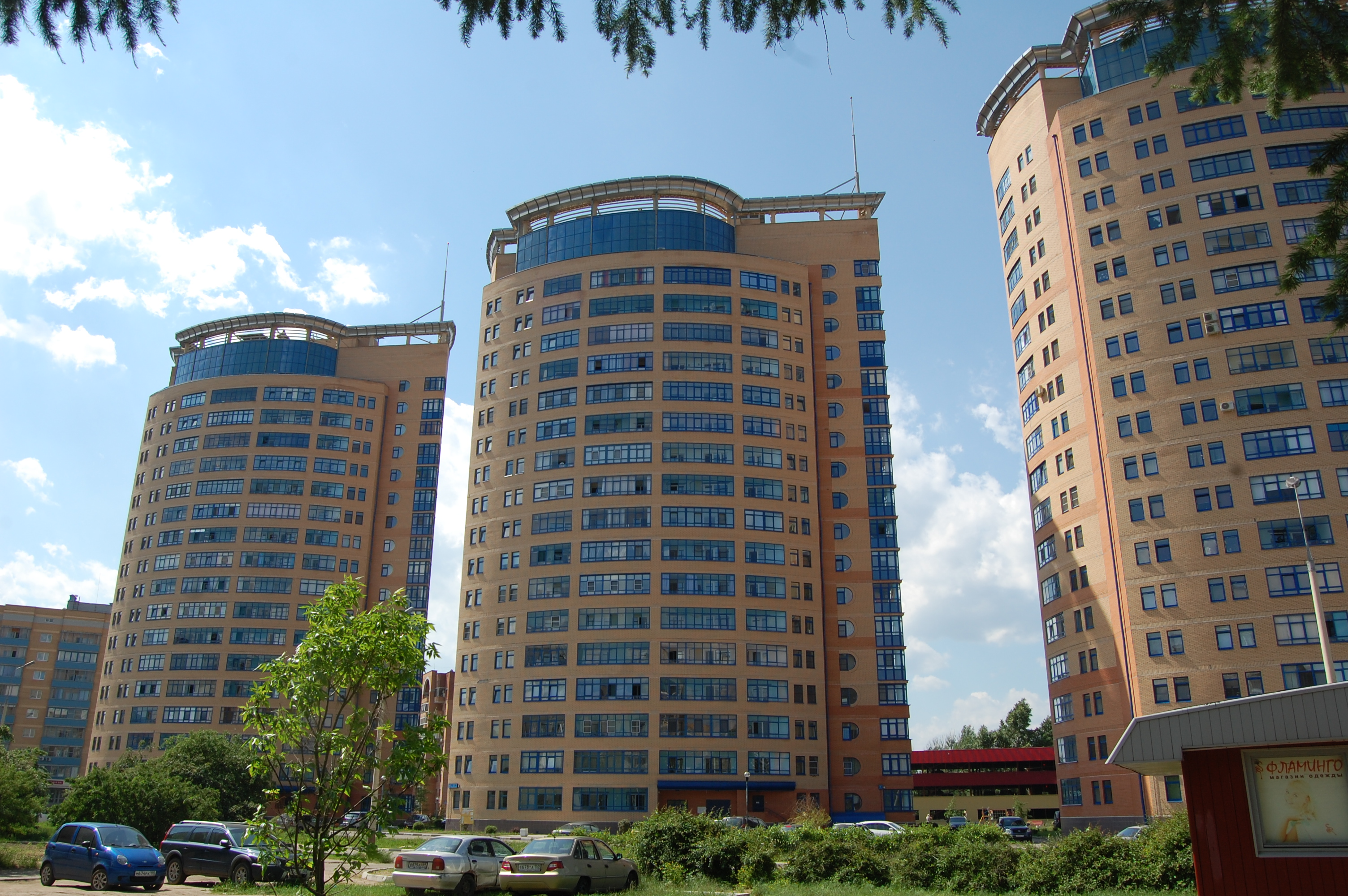
210. Dubna

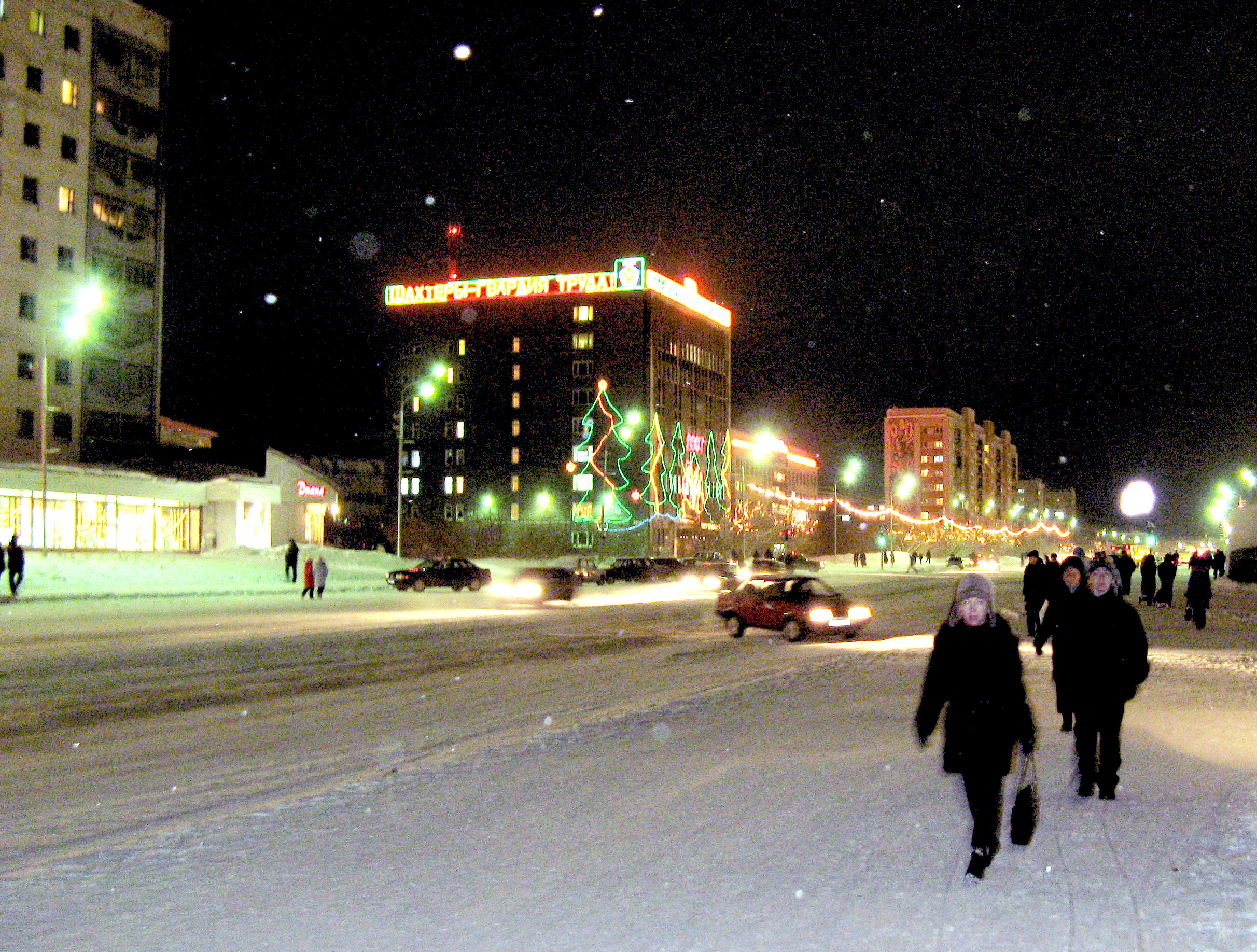
211. Vorkuta

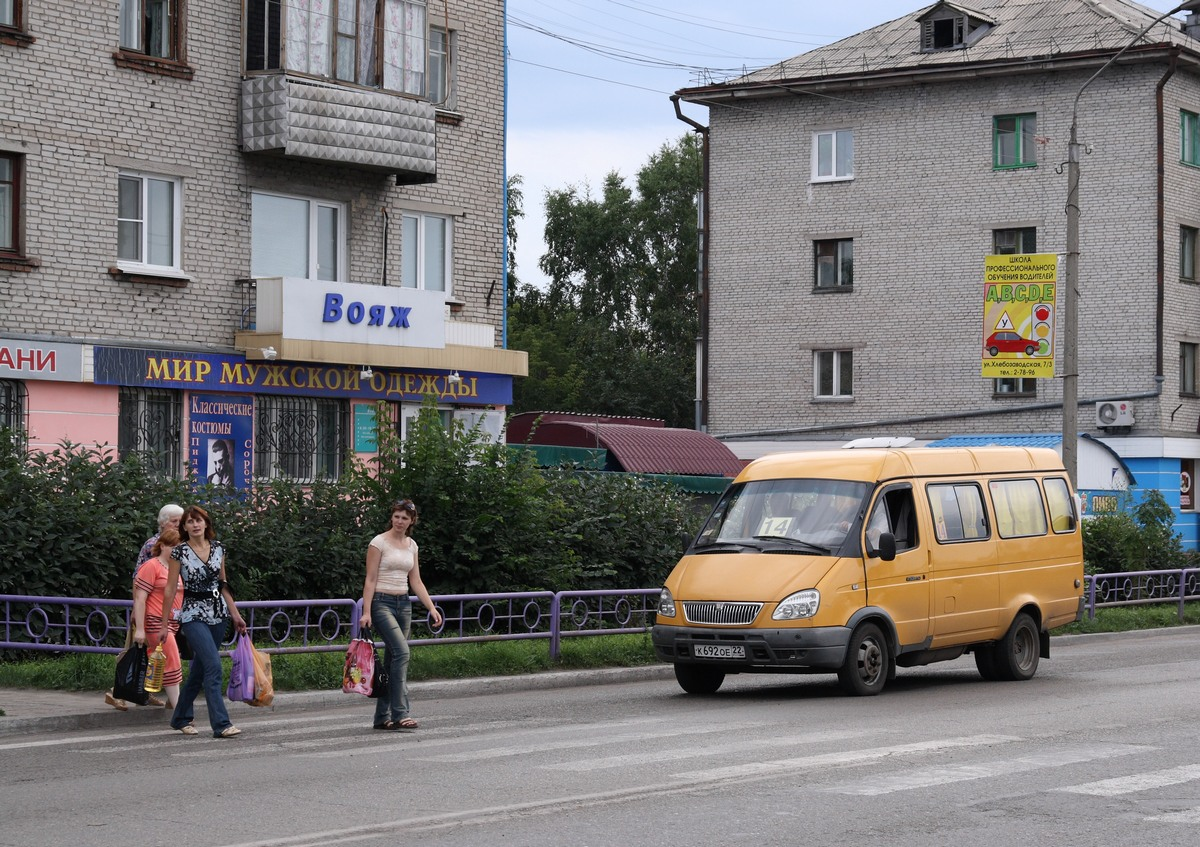
212. Novoaltaysk

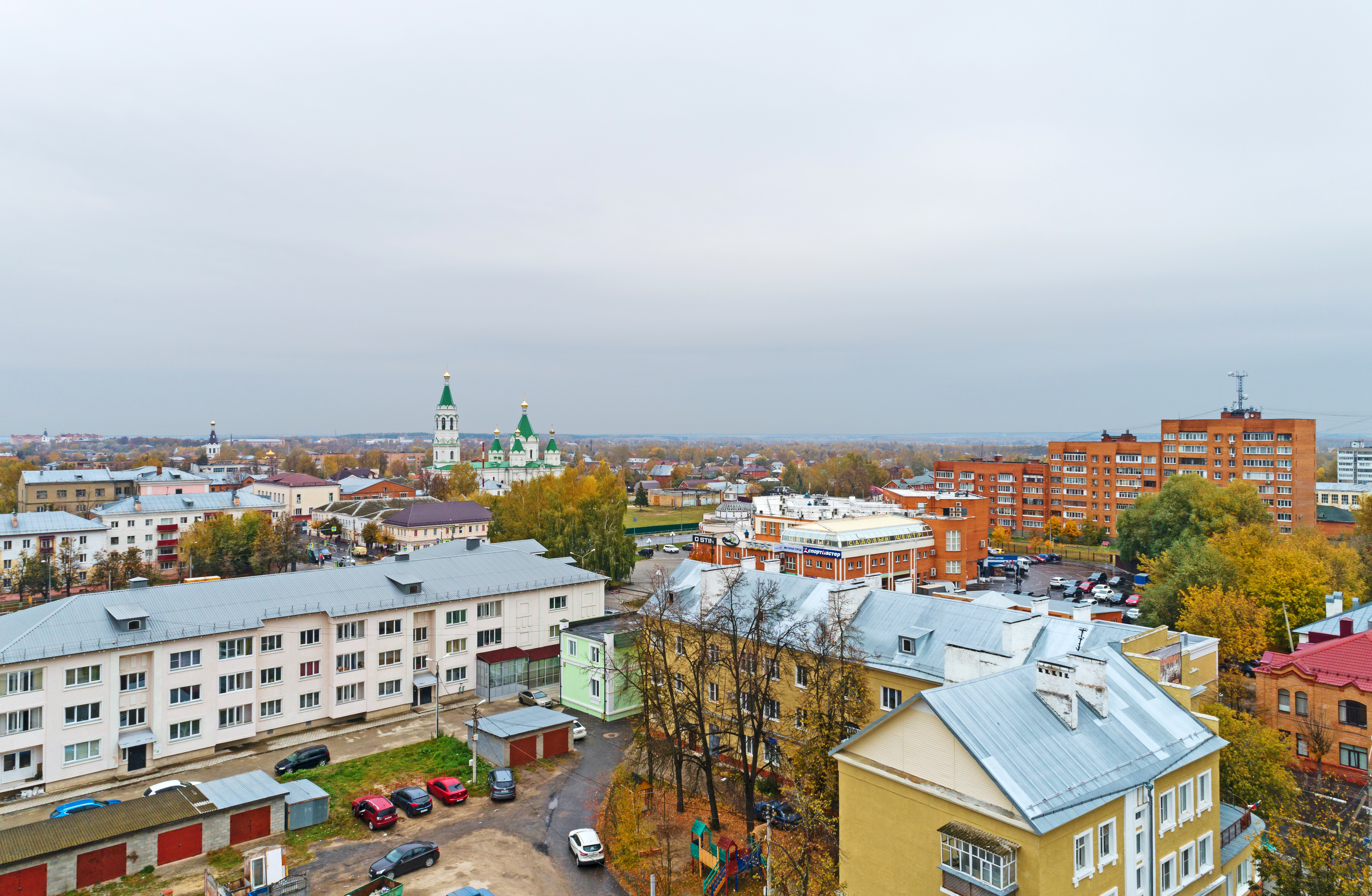
213. Yegoryevsk

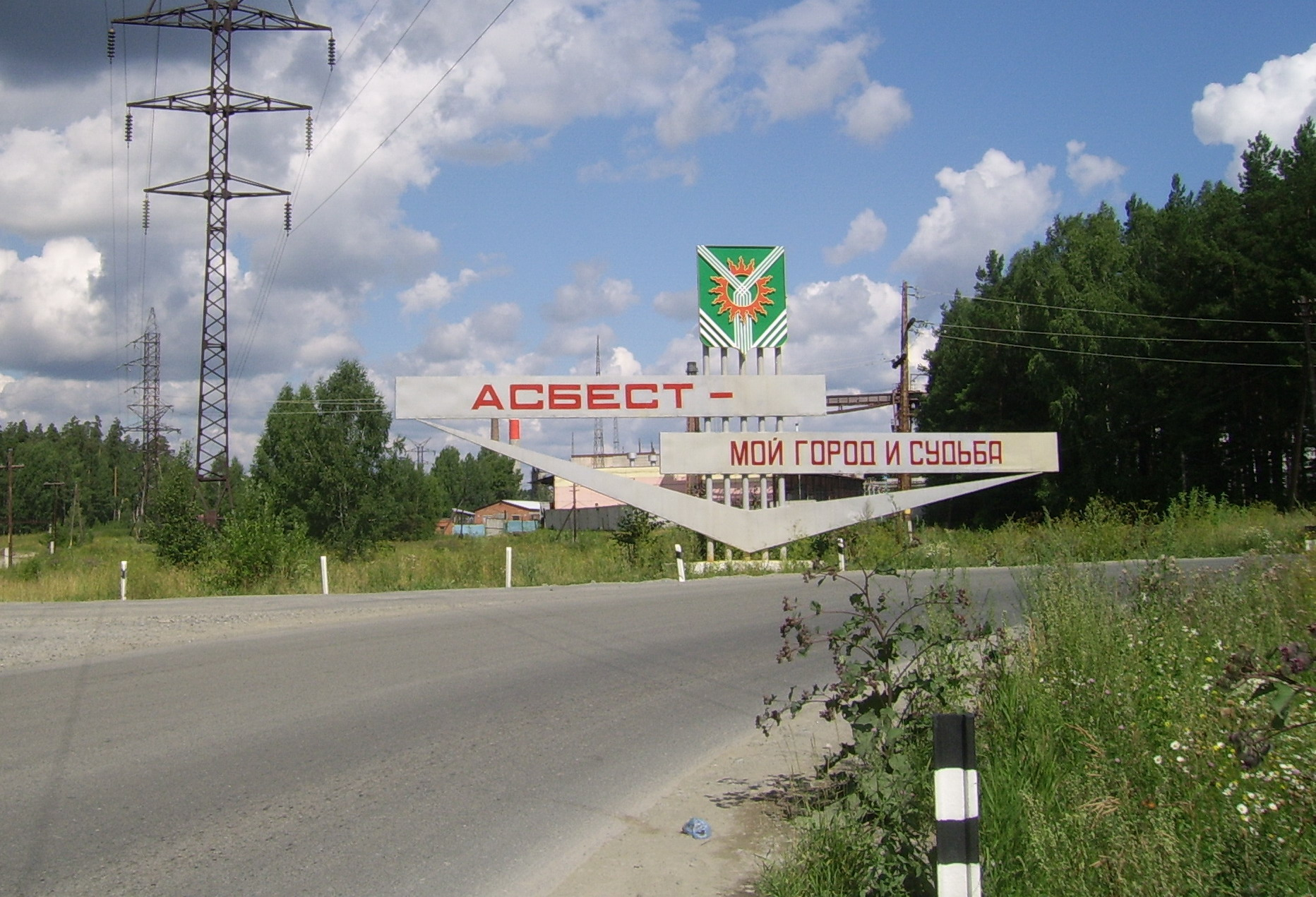
214. Asbest

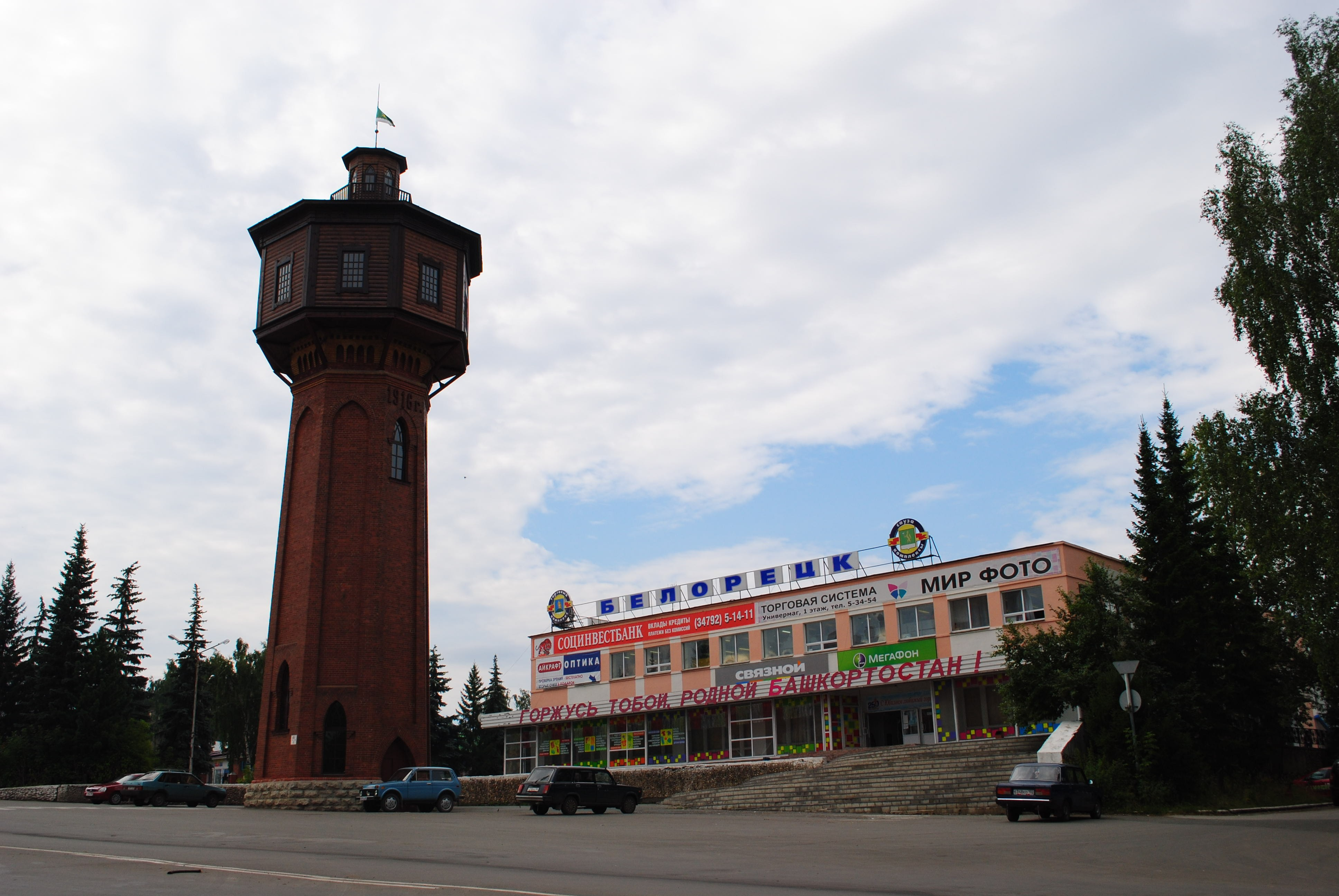
215. Beloretsk

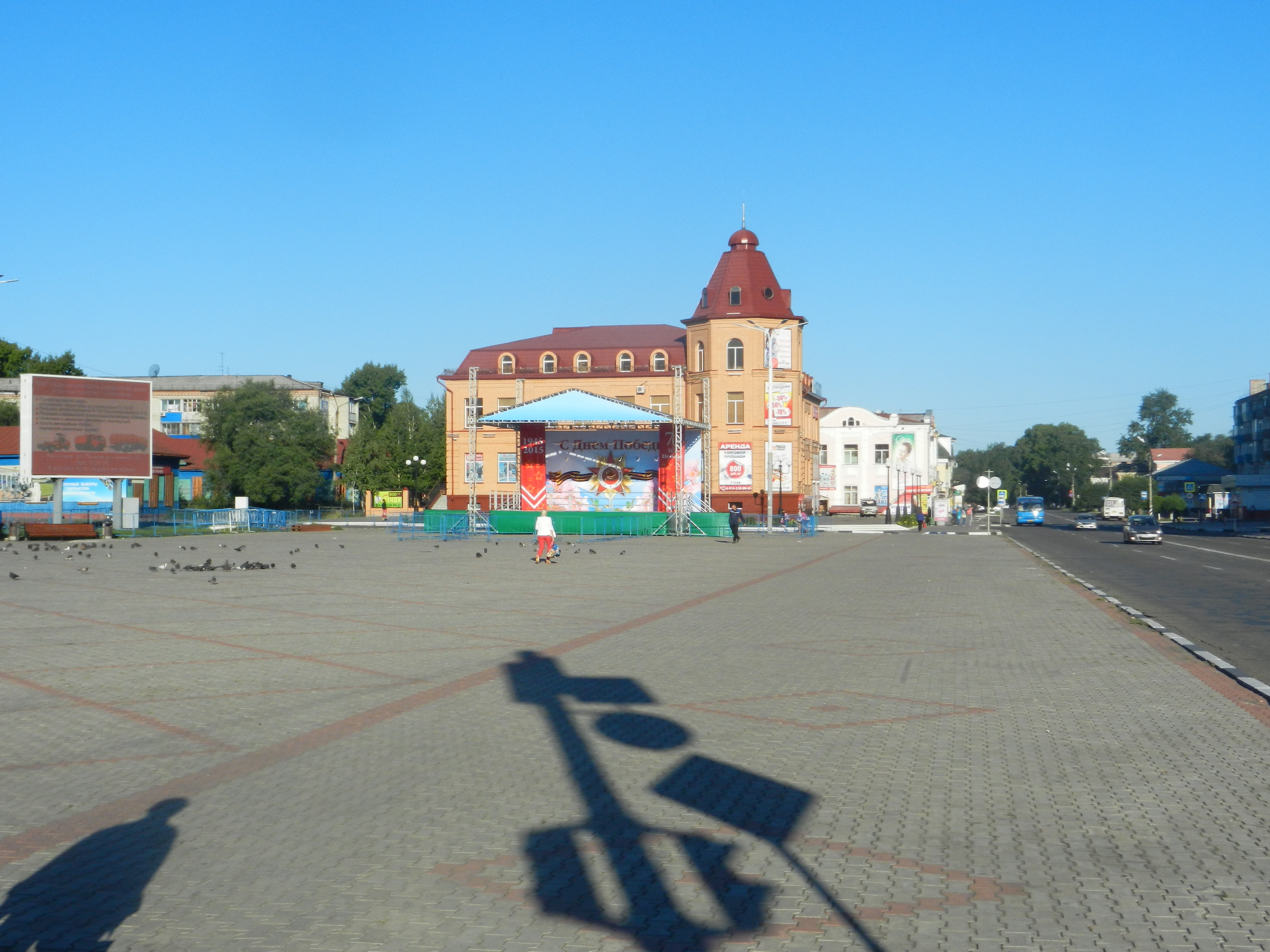
216. Belogorsk

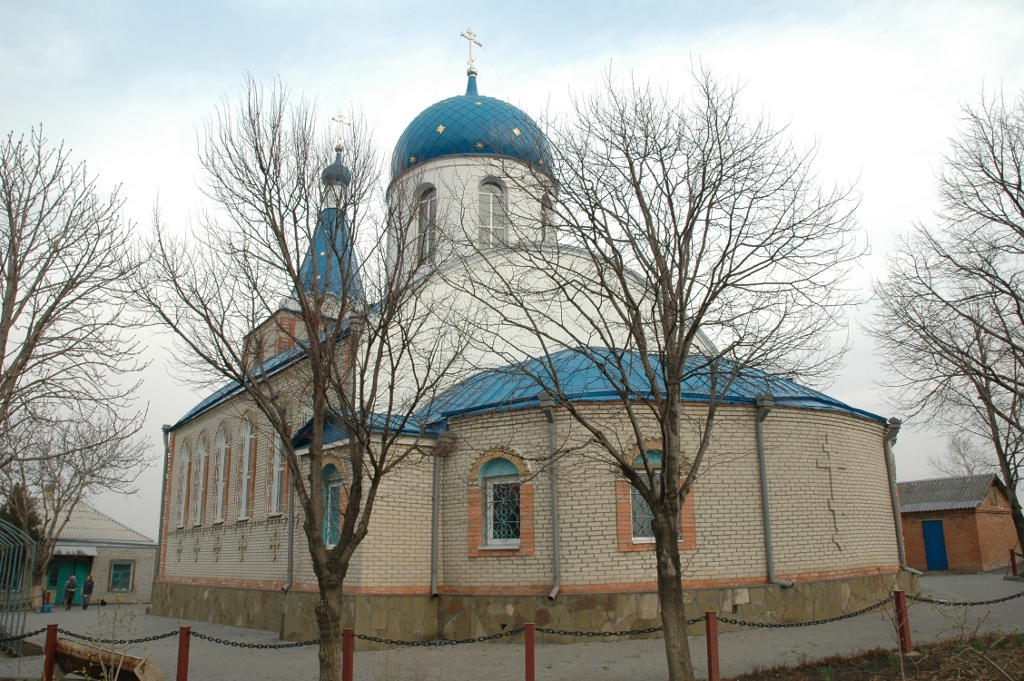
217. Gukovo

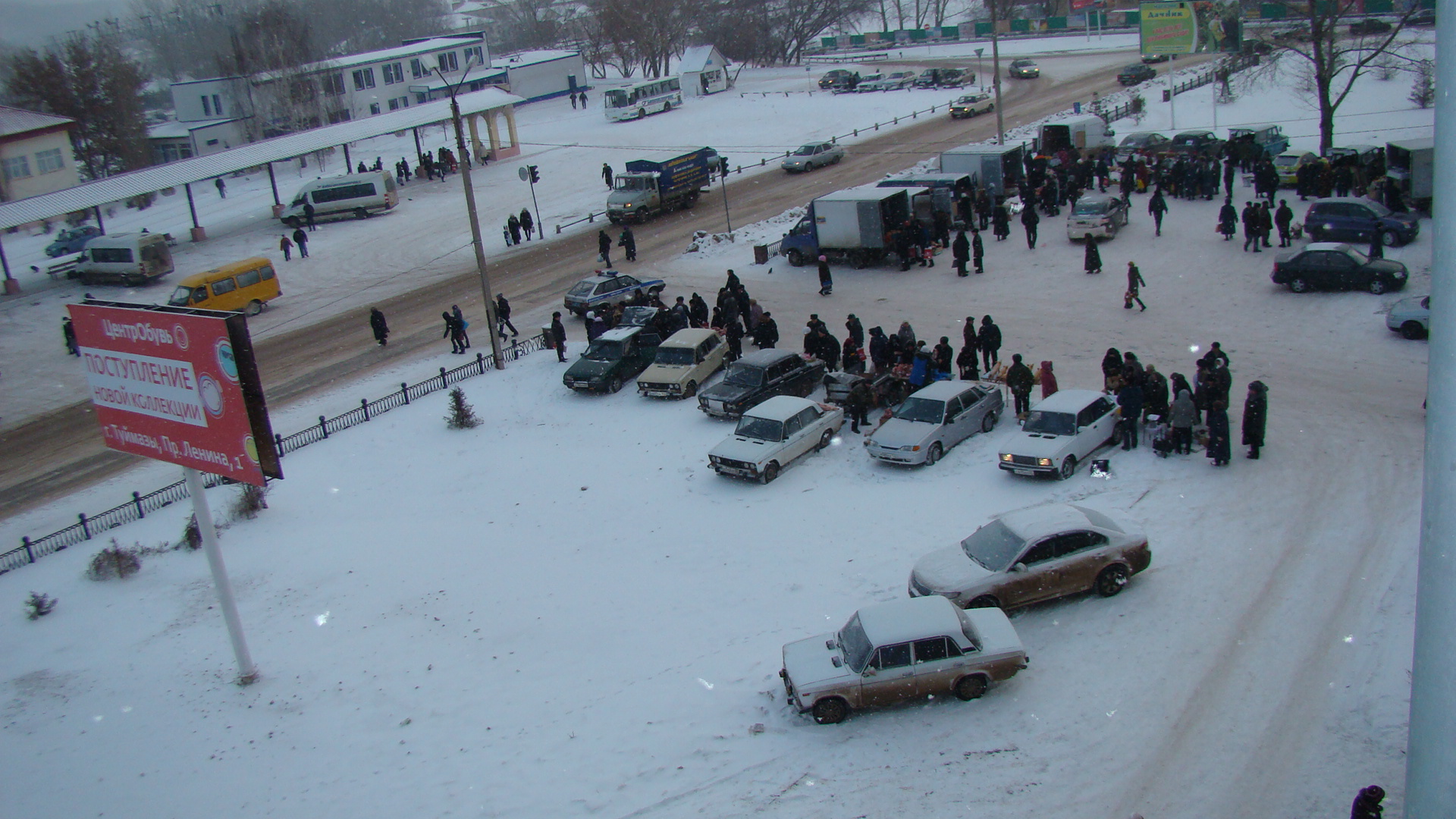
218. Tuymazy

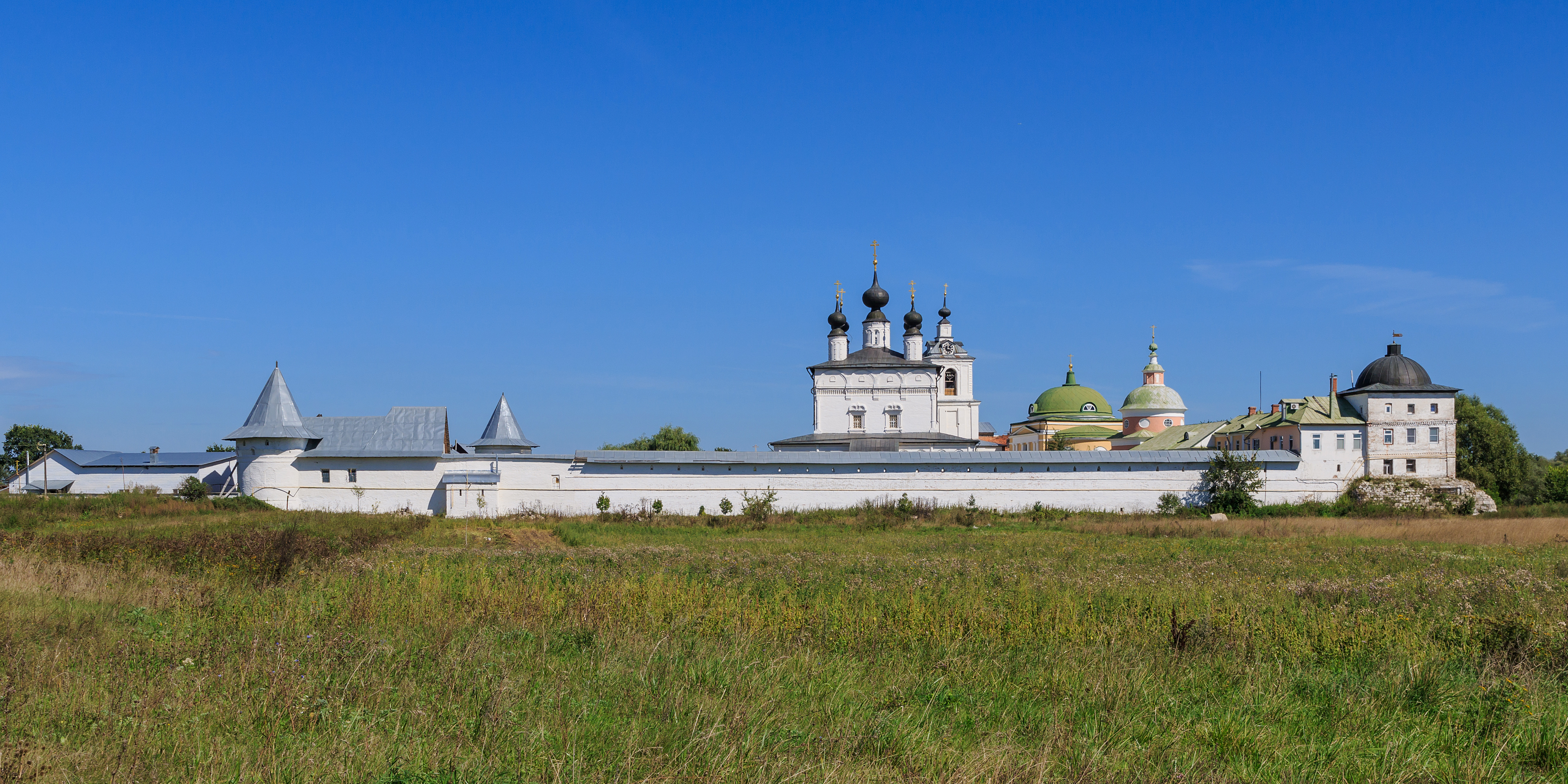
219. Stupino

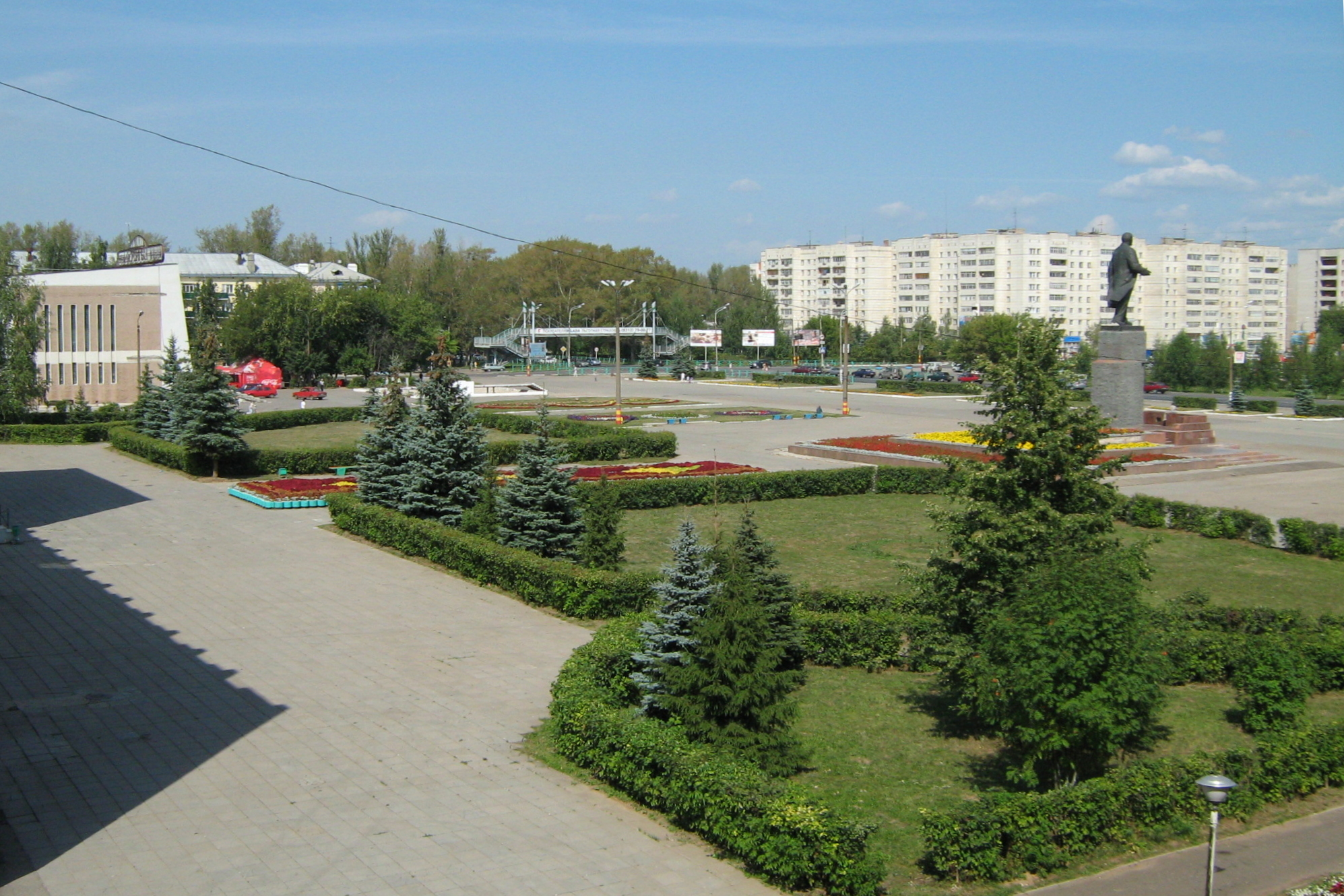
220. Kstovo

== See also ==
- Classification of inhabited localities in Russia
- List of renamed cities and towns in Russia
- List of cities in Asia
- List of cities in Europe
