= Obninsk constituency =

Obninsk single-member constituency
- Constituency of the Russian State Duma

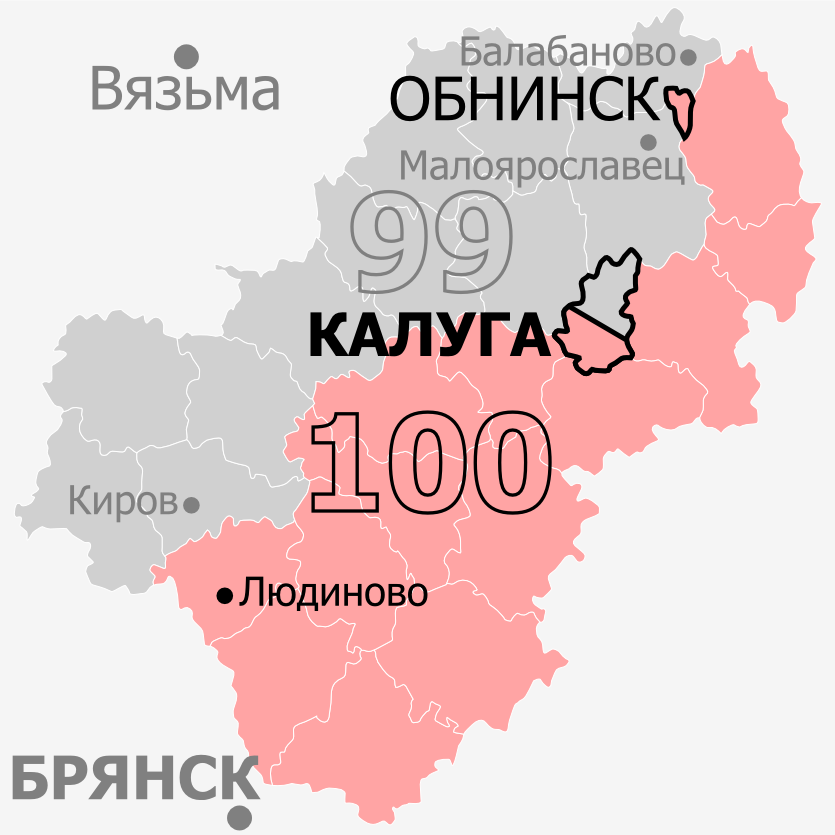
- Constituency boundaries from 2016 to 2026
- Deputy: None
- Federal subject: Kaluga Oblast
- Districts: Babyninsky, Duminichsky, Ferzikovsky, Kaluga (Leninsky), Khvastovichsky, Kozelsky, Lyudinovsky, Meshchovsky, Obninsk, Peremyshlsky, Sukhinichsky, Tarussky, Ulyanovsky, Zhizdrinsky, Zhukovsky
- Other territory: Germany (Frankfurt-2), Israel (Haifa-2)
- Voters: 409,585 (2021)

The Obninsk constituency (No.100 (Note: Dzerzhinsky constituency No.86 in 1993-1995 and 2003-2007, Dzerzhinsky constituency No.85 in 1995-2003)) is a Russian legislative constituency in Kaluga Oblast in 1993–2007 and 2016–2026. The constituency covered part of Kaluga, eastern and southern Kaluga Oblast. After 2025 redistricting Kaluga Oblast lost one of its two constituencies, so Obninsk constituency was dissolved and merged with Kaluga constituency.

The constituency was last represented by United Russia deputy Gennady Sklyar, non-profit president and former Russian Television and Radio Broadcasting Network general director. Sklyar was re-elected to the State Duma in 2026 in the Kaluga constituency.

== Boundaries ==
1993–2007 Dzerzhinsky constituency: Baryatinsky District, Borovsky District, Dzerzhinsky District, Iznoskovsky District, Kirov, Kirovsky District, Kuybyshevsky District, Lyudinovo, Lyudinovsky District, Maloyaroslavetsky District, Medynsky District, Meshchovsky District, Mosalsky District, Obninsk, Spas-Demensky District, Sukhinichsky District, Yukhnovsky District, Zhukovsky District
The constituency covered northern and western Kaluga Oblast, including the cities of Obninsk, Kirov and Lyudinovo.

2016–2026: Babyninsky District, Duminichsky District, Ferzikovsky District, Kaluga (Leninsky), Khvastovichsky District, Kozelsky District, Lyudinovsky District, Meshchovsky District, Obninsk, Peremyshlsky District, Sukhinichsky District, Tarussky District, Ulyanovsky District, Zhizdrinsky District, Zhukovsky District
The constituency was re-created for the 2016 election under the name "Obninsk constituency" and retained only Obninsk, Meshchovsky District, Sukhinichsky District and Zhukovsky District, losing the rest to Kaluga constituency. This seat instead gained Leninsky city district of Kaluga as well as rural eastern and southern Kaluga Oblast from the former Kaluga constituency.

== Members elected ==
Election	Member	Party
1993	Pavel Burdukov	Agrarian Party
1995	Pavel Burdukov	Agrarian Party
1999	Pavel Burdukov	Communist Party
2003	Viktor Kolesnikov	Independent
2007	Proportional representation - no election by constituency	
2011	Proportional representation - no election by constituency	
2016	Gennady Sklyar	United Russia
2021	Gennady Sklyar	United Russia

== Election results ==
=== 1993 ===
==== Declared candidates ====
- Pavel Burdukov (APR), sovkhoz director
- Vadim Danilin (RDDR), businessman
- Yevgeny Kharmansky (Kedr), ecological researcher
- Viktor Khaychenko (PRES), metallurgist
- Leonid Mikhalchuk (Independent), former Chairman of the Lyudinovo City Council of People's Deputies (1990–1993), construction executive
- Anatoly Mitryashkin (Independent), agriculture businessman
- Tatyana Rozanova (Civic Union), Kaluga Oblast administration official
- Gennady Sklyar (Independent), co-chairman of the Socialist Workers' Party (1991–present), former First Secretary of the CPSU Obninsk City Committee (1990–1991)
- Raisa Skripitsyna (Women of Russia), Vice Mayor of Obninsk (1980–present)
- Vadim Solovyov (CPRF), union organizer, lawyer
- Lev Timofeev (Choice of Russia), co-chairman of the Moscow Helsinki Group (1989–present), writer, human rights activist

==== Results ====
Summary of the 12 December 1993 Russian legislative election in the Dzerzhinsky constituency
Candidate	Party	Votes	%
Pavel Burdukov	Agrarian Party	31,828	12.61%
Anatoly Mitryashkin	Independent	–	12.56%
Vadim Danilin	Russian Democratic Reform Movement	–	–
Yevgeny Kharmansky	Kedr	–	–
Viktor Khaychenko	Party of Russian Unity and Accord	–	–
Leonid Mikhalchuk	Independent	–	–
Tatyana Rozanova	Civic Union	–	–
Gennady Sklyar	Independent	–	–
Raisa Skripitsyna	Women of Russia	–	–
Vadim Solovyov	Communist Party	–	–
Lev Timofeev	Choice of Russia	–	–
Total		252,449	100%

=== 1995 ===
==== Declared candidates ====
- Viktor Baburin (NDR), Head of Administration of Dzerzhinsky District (1990–present)
- Pavel Burdukov (APR), incumbent Member of State Duma (1994–present)
- Nina Illarionova (Union of Communists), Member of Obninsk City Assembly (1994–present), engineer
- Marina Khomenko (DOBRo), afterschool education centre director
- Anatoly Mitryashkin (Independent), city manager of Maloyaroslavets, 1993 candidate for this seat
- Aleksandr Morozov (Yabloko), Obninsk Institute for Nuclear Power Engineering head of laboratory
- Grigory Nikishkin (Independent), businessman
- Anatoly Poddubny (PPR–ST), iron plant director
- Eduard Samoylov (PST), Member of Obninsk City Assembly (1994–present), journalist
- Sergey Sharshakov (Duma-96), businessman
- Gennady Sklyar (KRO), aide to Federation Council member Valery Sudarenkov, 1993 candidate for this seat
- Raisa Skripitsyna (Women of Russia), Member of State Duma (1994–present), 1993 candidate for this seat
- Aleksandr Ushakov (Independent), head of the Russian National Unity office in Obninsk
- Aleksandr Vasyutin (Independent), former First Deputy Chairman of the Kaluga Oblast Executive Committee (1988–1989)
- Aleksey Yezhukov (Independent), agriculture businessman

==== Results ====
Summary of the 17 December 1995 Russian legislative election in the Dzerzhinsky constituency
Candidate	Party	Votes	%
Pavel Burdukov (incumbent)	Agrarian Party	49,735	18.16%
Viktor Baburin	Our Home – Russia	32,448	11.85%
Grigory Nikishkin	Independent	27,361	9.99%
Anatoly Poddubny	Trade Unions and Industrialists – Union of Labour	27,049	9.87%
Anatoly Mitryashkin	Independent	21,838	7.97%
Gennady Sklyar	Congress of Russian Communities	21,747	7.94%
Nina Illarionova	Union of Communists	12,220	4.46%
Raisa Skripitsyna	Women of Russia	11,700	4.27%
Aleksandr Morozov	Yabloko	11,223	4.10%
Aleksey Yezhukov	Independent	6,244	2.28%
Aleksandr Vasyutin	Independent	5,575	2.04%
Eduard Samoylov	Party of Workers' Self-Government	4,346	1.59%
Aleksandr Ushakov	Independent	3,732	1.36%
Marina Khomenko	Education — Future of Russia	2,705	0.99%
Sergey Sharshakov	Duma-96	1,834	0.67%
against all		21,701	7.92%
Total		273,937	100%

=== 1999 ===
==== Declared candidates ====
- Vladimir Bogdanov (DN), party press secretary
- Vladimir Bogomolov (Independent), Member of Legislative Assembly of Kaluga Oblast (1996–present), insurance businessman
- Pavel Burdukov (CPRF), incumbent Member of State Duma (1994–present)
- Vasily Churin (Independent), Head of Administration of Zhukovsky District
- Igor Dyumin (LDPR), aide to State Duma member
- Mikhail Glazunov (Independent), paper production businessman
- Viktor Konstantinov (Independent), militsiya officer
- Tatyana Kotlyar (SPS), Member of Obninsk City Assembly
- Vyacheslav Mikhaylov (Yabloko), Minister for Federation Affairs and Nationalities of Russia (1995–1998, 1999–present)
- Yury Podtikhov (Kedr), chief sanitary doctor of Dzerzhinsky District
- Semyon Shershnev (Independent), Gazprom construction executive
- Aleksandr Tereshchenko (Nikolayev–Fyodorov Bloc), director of the Fyodorov Eye Microsurgery Complex Kaluga branch

==== Failed to qualify ====
- Boris Fedotov (Independent), former military commissioner of Obninsk (1990–1992)

==== Did not file ====
- Aleksey Barkhatov (Independent), writer, literary critic
- Yulia Filatova (KRO-Boldyrev)
- Oleg Melnikov (Independent)
- Andrey Olerinsky (Independent)
- Valery Salazkin (Social Democrats), nonprofit president
- Nina Solovyova (Independent)

==== Results ====
Summary of the 19 December 1999 Russian legislative election in the Dzerzhinsky constituency
Candidate	Party	Votes	%
Pavel Burdukov (incumbent)	Communist Party	52,430	20.30%
Semyon Shershnev	Independent	49,279	19.08%
Vladimir Bogomolov	Independent	33,789	13.08%
Mikhail Glazunov	Independent	25,763	9.98%
Vasily Churin	Independent	17,338	6.71%
Tatyana Kotlyar	Union of Right Forces	15,973	6.18%
Vyacheslav Mikhaylov	Yabloko	8,322	3.22%
Viktor Konstantinov	Independent	7,838	3.03%
Aleksandr Tereshchenko	Andrey Nikolayev and Svyatoslav Fyodorov Bloc	7,569	2.93%
Igor Dyumin	Liberal Democratic Party	4,108	1.59%
Vladimir Bogdanov	Spiritual Heritage	3,618	1.40%
Yury Podtikhov	Kedr	2,384	0.92%
against all		25,299	9.80%
Total		258,261	100%

=== 2003 ===
==== Declared candidates ====
- Pavel Burdukov (APR), incumbent Member of State Duma (1994–present) (previously ran as an independent candidate)
- Viktor Kolesnikov (Independent), Senator from Kaluga Oblast (2001–present)
- Tatyana Kotlyar (SPS), Member of Legislative Assembly of Kaluga Oblast (2000–present), 1999 candidate for this seat
- Nikolay Kuznetsov (LDPR), aide to State Duma member
- Igor Lizunov (ZRS), cossack ataman
- Vladimir Makhtey (VR–ES), bank executive

==== Did not file ====
- Valery Gerasimov (Independent), factory supplier
- Vladislav Morozov (Yabloko), liquidation manager

==== Results ====
Summary of the 7 December 2003 Russian legislative election in the Dzerzhinsky constituency
Candidate	Party	Votes	%
Viktor Kolesnikov	Independent	69,840	30.39%
Pavel Burdukov (incumbent)	Agrarian Party	60,239	26.21%
Tatyana Kotlyar	Union of Right Forces	38,736	16.85%
Nikolay Kuznetsov	Liberal Democratic Party	15,868	6.90%
Igor Lizunov	For a Holy Russia	6,294	2.74%
Vladimir Makhtey	Great Russia – Eurasian Union	3,774	1.64%
against all		30,939	13.46%
Total		230,205	100%

=== 2016 ===
==== Declared candidates ====
- Vadim Dengin (LDPR), Member of State Duma (2011–present), 2015 gubernatorial candidate
- Sergey Dondo (CPCR), party official, perennial candidate
- Marina Kostina (CPRF), Member of Legislative Assembly of Kaluga Oblast (2004–present)
- Oleg Ovsyannikov (Yabloko), realtor
- Gennady Sklyar (United Russia), advisor to Governor of Kaluga Oblast Anatoly Artamonov, former director general of RTRS (2001–2008), 1993 and 1995 candidate for this seat
- Aleksandr Trushkov (A Just Russia), former Member of Legislative Assembly of Kaluga Oblast (2010–2015), liquor businessman
- Anton Vasilyev (Patriots of Russia), security businessman

==== Failed to qualify ====
- Vasily Loktistov (GS), unemployed
- Nikolay Ovchinkin (Party of Growth), businessman

==== Did not file ====
- Anton Reshetnikov (Independent), businessman

==== Declined ====
- Tatyana Drozdova (United Russia), Member of Legislative Assembly of Kaluga Oblast (2004–present), middle school principal (lost the primary)
- Oleg Komissar (United Russia), Member of Legislative Assembly of Kaluga Oblast (2015–present), chemical executive (lost the primary)
- Anatoly Kovalyov (United Russia), Member of State Duma (2015–present)
- Anatoly Sotnikov (United Russia), Member of Legislative Assembly of Kaluga Oblast (2004–2010, 2015–present)
- Vladimir Vikulin (United Russia), Chairman of the Obninsk City Assembly (2005–2010, 2015–present), former Member of Legislative Assembly of Kaluga Oblast (2010–2015)

==== Results ====
Summary of the 18 September 2016 Russian legislative election in the Obninsk constituency
Candidate	Party	Votes	%
Gennady Sklyar	United Russia	80,615	45.35%
Marina Kostina	Communist Party	34,007	19.13%
Vadim Dengin	Liberal Democratic Party	23,291	13.10%
Aleksandr Trushkov	A Just Russia	13,313	7.49%
Anton Vasilyev	Patriots of Russia	7,419	4.17%
Oleg Ovsyannikov	Yabloko	6,611	3.72%
Sergey Dondo	Communists of Russia	6,325	3.56%
Total		177,746	100%

=== 2021 ===
==== Declared candidates ====
- Marina Arkhitova (New People), party activist
- Nikolay Ivanov (CPRF), Member of Meshchovsky District Assembly (2010–present), former Head of Administration of Meshchovsky District
- Dmitry Lozenko (LDPR), Member of Legislative Assembly of Kaluga Oblast (2020–present), aide to Senator Vadim Dengin
- Oleg Luzhetsky (Note: previously known as Oleg Ovsyannikov) (Yabloko), realtor, 2016 candidate for this seat
- Gennady Sklyar (United Russia), incumbent Member of State Duma (2016–present)
- Natalya Terekhova (RPPSS), Member of Legislative Assembly of Kaluga Oblast (2020–present), businesswoman
- Vladimir Yefremov (The Greens), manager
- Nadezhda Yefremova (SR–ZP), Member of Legislative Assembly of Kaluga Oblast (2020–present), legal counsel, 2020 gubernatorial candidate

==== Failed to qualify ====
- Andrey Zykov (Independent), Member of Obninsk City Assembly (2015–present), pharmaceutical businessman

==== Declined ====
- Varvara Antokhina (United Russia), former Minister of Natural Resources and Ecology of Kaluga Oblast (2015–2020) (lost the primary)
- Oleg Komissar (United Russia), Member of Legislative Assembly of Kaluga Oblast (2015–present), chemical executive (lost the primary)
- Anatoly Suyarko (United Russia), Head of Administration of Zhukovsky District (2011–present) (lost the primary)

==== Results ====
Summary of the 17-19 September 2021 Russian legislative election in the Obninsk constituency
Candidate	Party	Votes	%
Gennady Sklyar (incumbent)	United Russia	60,779	33.19%
Nikolay Ivanov	Communist Party	34,175	18.66%
Nadezhda Yefremova	A Just Russia — For Truth	26,253	14.34%
Marina Arkhitova	New People	18,169	9.92%
Natalya Terekhova	Party of Pensioners	16,290	8.90%
Dmitry Lozenko	Liberal Democratic Party	10,831	5.91%
Vladimir Yefremov	The Greens	4,957	2.71%
Oleg Luzhetsky	Yabloko	3,289	1.80%
Total		183,115	100%
