= Kaluga constituency =

Electoral district in Russia

Kaluga single-member constituency
- Constituency of the Russian State Duma
- Deputy: Gennady Sklyar; United Russia
- Federal subject: Kaluga Oblast
- Districts: Babyninsky, Baryatinsky, Borovsky, Duminichsky, Dzerzhinsky, Ferzikovsky, Iznoskovsky, Kaluga, Khvastovichsky, Kirovsky, Kozelsky, Kuybyshevsky, Lyudinovsky, Maloyaroslavetsky, Medynsky, Meshchovsky, Mosalsky, Obninsk, Peremyshlsky, Spas-Demensky, Sukhinichsky, Tarussky, Ulyanovsky, Yukhnovsky, Zhizdrinsky, Zhukovsky
- Voters: 783,767 (2026)

The Kaluga constituency (No.101 (Note: No.87 in 1993-1995 and 2003-2007, No.86 in 1995-2003, No.99 in 2016–2026)) is a Russian legislative constituency in Kaluga Oblast. The constituency covers the entire territory of Kaluga Oblast.

The constituency has been represented since 2026 by United Russia deputy Gennady Sklyar, three-term State Duma member and former Russian Television and Radio Broadcasting Network director general, who was redistricted from the eliminated Obninsk constituency and won the open seat, succeeding one-term United Russia incumbent Olga Korobova.

== Boundaries ==
1993–2007: Babyninsky District, Duminichsky District, Ferzikovsky District, Kaluga, Khvastovichsky District, Kozelsky District, Peremyshlsky District, Tarussky District, Ulyanovsky District, Zhizdrinsky District
The constituency covered oblast capital Kaluga as well as rural eastern and southern Kaluga Oblast.

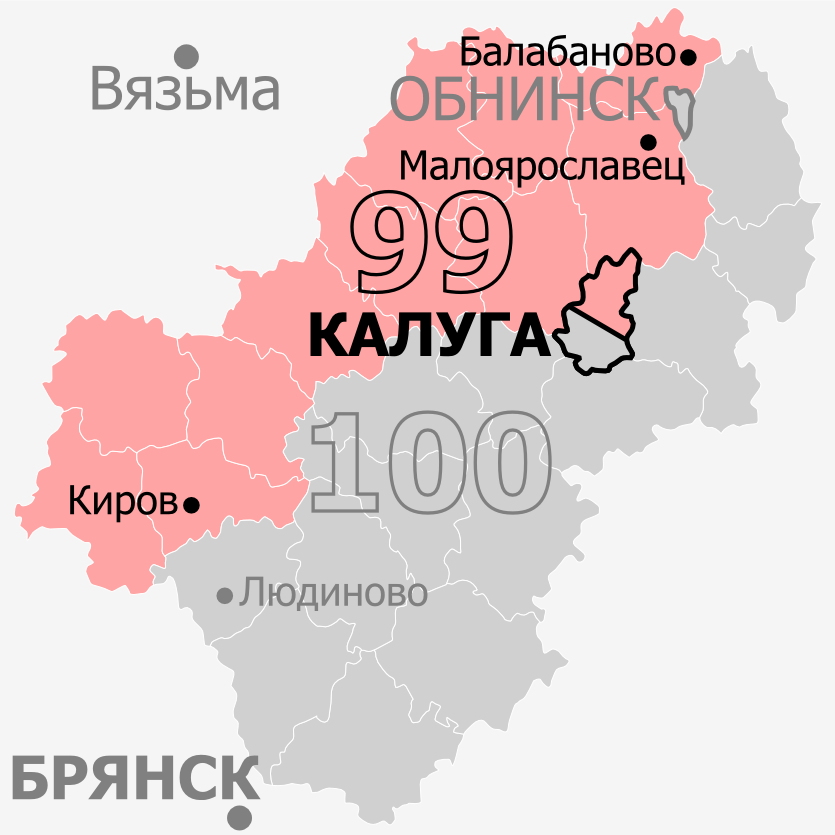
Constituency boundaries from 2016 to 2026

2016–2026: Baryatinsky District, Borovsky District, Dzerzhinsky District, Iznoskovsky District, Kaluga (Moskovsky, Oktyabrsky), Kirovsky District, Kuybyshevsky District, Maloyaroslavetsky District, Medynsky District, Mosalsky District, Spas-Demensky District, Yukhnovsky District
The constituency was re-created for the 2016 election and retained only Moskovsky and Oktyabrsky city districts of Kaluga, losing the rest to Obninsk constituency. This seat instead gained rural northern and western Kaluga Oblast from the former Dzerzhinsky constituency.

2026–present: Babyninsky District, Baryatinsky District, Borovsky District, Duminichsky District, Dzerzhinsky District, Ferzikovsky District, Iznoskovsky District, Kaluga, Khvastovichsky District, Kirovsky District, Kozelsky District, Kuybyshevsky District, Lyudinovsky District, Maloyaroslavetsky District, Medynsky District, Meshchovsky District, Mosalsky District, Obninsk, Peremyshlsky District, Spas-Demensky District, Sukhinichsky District, Tarussky District, Ulyanovsky District, Yukhnovsky District, Zhizdrinsky District, Zhukovsky District
After the 2025 redistricting Kaluga Oblast lost one of its two constituencies, so both Kaluga and Obninsk constituencies were merged into a single constituency, covering the entirety of Kaluga Oblast.

== Members elected ==
Election	Member	Party
1993	Ella Pamfilova	Choice of Russia
1995	Ella Pamfilova	Pamfilova–Gurov–Lysenko
1999	Vyacheslav Boyko	Communist Party
2003	Olga Selivyorstova	Independent
2007	Proportional representation - no election by constituency	
2011	Proportional representation - no election by constituency	
2016	Aleksandr Avdeyev	United Russia
2021	Olga Korobova	United Russia
2026	Gennady Sklyar	United Russia

== Election results ==
=== 1993 ===
Summary of the 12 December 1993 Russian legislative election in the Kaluga constituency
Candidate	Party	Votes	%
Ella Pamfilova	Choice of Russia	75,401	29.83%
Rudolf Panferov	Independent	–	7.50%
Aleksandr Boyko	Party of Russian Unity and Accord	–	–
Aleksandr Chetverikov	Future of Russia–New Names	–	–
Yury Fedunov	Agrarian Party	–	–
Aleksandr Kalmykov	Independent	–	–
Igor Khanin	Independent	–	–
Leonid Korol	Independent	–	–
Aleksandra Opalskaya	Independent	–	–
Ovanes Petrosyan	Russian Democratic Reform Movement	–	–
Nikolay Sanko	Yavlinsky–Boldyrev–Lukin	–	–
Vladimir Sizov	Independent	–	–
Aleksandr Suvorov	Independent	–	–
Ivan Vasilyev	Independent	–	–
Total		252,728	100%

=== 1995 ===
Summary of the 17 December 1995 Russian legislative election in the Kaluga constituency
Candidate	Party	Votes	%
Ella Pamfilova (incumbent)	Pamfilova–Gurov–Lysenko	62,001	21.89%
Vyacheslav Boyko	Communist Party	60,454	21.35%
Viktor Minakov	Our Home – Russia	40,437	14.28%
Valery Reshitko	Trade Unions and Industrialists – Union of Labour	25,304	8.93%
Andrey Blinov	Congress of Russian Communities	16,621	5.87%
Vladimir Kostenko	Independent	13,268	4.68%
Mikhail Sidorov	Liberal Democratic Party	12,824	4.53%
Nikolay Zhdanov-Lutsenko	My Fatherland	8,823	3.12%
Vyacheslav Popkov	Communists and Working Russia - for the Soviet Union	8,095	2.86%
Nikolay Strelnikov	Independent	4,398	1.55%
Natalya Abramova	Zemsky Sobor	4,242	1.50%
Natalya Khramtsova	Independent	1,568	0.55%
Nikolay Vasilevich	Tikhonov-Tupolev-Tikhonov	499	0.18%
against all		19,688	6.95%
Total		283,206	100%

=== 1999 ===
Summary of the 19 December 1999 Russian legislative election in the Kaluga constituency
Candidate	Party	Votes	%
Vyacheslav Boyko	Communist Party	53,405	20.52%
Lyudmila Berestova	Women of Russia	32,574	12.52%
Anatoly Minakov	Our Home – Russia	25,996	9.99%
Viktor Pakhno	Fatherland – All Russia	21,774	8.37%
Tatyana Fedyayeva	Independent	14,141	5.43%
Oleg Kutepov	Andrey Nikolayev and Svyatoslav Fyodorov Bloc	13,942	5.36%
Yury Zelnikov	Independent	13,167	5.06%
Aleksey Karpeyev	Independent	9,558	3.67%
Aleksandr Gonchar	Independent	8,863	3.41%
Galina Bozhedomova	Yabloko	8,793	3.38%
Yevgeny Shevchenko	Independent	6,431	2.47%
Andrey Dlugunovich	Liberal Democratic Party	4,922	1.89%
Vladimir Novopoltsev	Independent	4,911	1.89%
Valentin Dubachev	Independent	3,560	1.37%
Dmitry Vovchuk	Congress of Russian Communities-Yury Boldyrev Movement	2,745	1.05%
Sergey Vovchuk	Independent	2,589	0.99%
Andrey Petrov	Spiritual Heritage	1,512	0.58%
against all		27,492	10.56%
Total		260,219	100%

=== 2003 ===
Summary of the 7 December 2003 Russian legislative election in the Kaluga constituency
Candidate	Party	Votes	%
Olga Selivyorstova	Independent	49,495	21.97%
Sergey Koshevoy	Independent	36,445	16.18%
Yury Levenkov	Independent	19,248	8.54%
Vyacheslav Boyko (incumbent)	Communist Party	15,625	6.94%
Oleg Kutepov	Rodina	11,426	5.07%
Vyacheslav Gorbatin	Independent	10,959	4.86%
Andrey Zavrazhnov	Independent	10,391	4.61%
Sergey Fadeyev	Yabloko	7,375	3.27%
Yevgeny Shevchenko	Independent	7,298	3.24%
Sergey Panasov	Liberal Democratic Party	4,880	2.17%
Valery Baranovich	Independent	4,022	1.79%
Karp Didenko	Independent	4,005	1.78%
Andrey Smolovik	Independent	3,500	1.55%
Valentin Arkhipov	Independent	3,168	1.41%
Valery Salazkin	Democratic Party	1,119	0.50%
against all		32,824	14.57%
Total		225,551	100%

=== 2016 ===
Summary of the 18 September 2016 Russian legislative election in the Kaluga constituency
Candidate	Party	Votes	%
Aleksandr Avdeyev	United Russia	75,154	46.66%
Nikolay Yashkin	Communist Party	27,577	17.12%
Marina Trishina	Liberal Democratic Party	18,122	11.25%
Nadezhda Yefremova	A Just Russia	12,966	8.05%
Aleksey Kolesnikov	Yabloko	7,284	4.52%
Anton Tarasenko	Communists of Russia	6,096	3.78%
Aleksandr Chernov	Rodina	5,317	3.30%
Andrey Bekker	Patriots of Russia	2,746	1.70%
Total		161,057	100%

=== 2021 ===
Summary of the 17-19 September 2021 Russian legislative election in the Kaluga constituency
Candidate	Party	Votes	%
Olga Korobova	United Russia	57,025	35.65%
Nikolay Yashkin	Communist Party	32,212	20.14%
Aleksandr Bychkov	A Just Russia — For Truth	16,128	10.08%
Dmitry Zubov	New People	13,000	8.13%
Vladimir Mikhaylov	Party of Pensioners	10,182	6.36%
Igor Golovnev	Liberal Democratic Party	9,932	6.21%
Mikhail Matiko	Communists of Russia	8,259	5.16%
Viktor Shcherbakov	The Greens	3,877	2.42%
Dmitry Rakhe	Party of Growth	1,665	1.04%
Total		159,971	100%

=== 2026 ===
Summary of the 18-20 September 2026 Russian legislative election in the Kaluga constituency
Candidate	Party	Votes	%
Gennady Sklyar (incumbent) (Note: redistricted from Obninsk constituency)	United Russia	150,869	38.95%
Nikolay Yashkin	Communist Party	73,267	18.92%
Anastasia Burlyay	New People	41,931	10.83%
Andrey Lepekhin	Liberal Democratic Party	33,862	8.74%
Margarita Andreyeva	The Greens	28,943	7.47%
Andrey Smolovik	A Just Russia	27,520	7.11%
Nikolay Martynov	Rodina	18,913	4.88%
Total		387,298	100%
