= Baryatino =

Baryatino (Russian: Барятино) is the name of several rural localities in Russia:

- Baryatino, Baryatinsky District, Kaluga Oblast, a selo in Baryatinsky District, Kaluga Oblast
- Baryatino, Dzerzhinsky District, Kaluga Oblast, a selo in Dzerzhinsky District, Kaluga Oblast
- Baryatino, Meshchovsky District, Kaluga Oblast, a village in Meshchovsky District, Kaluga Oblast
- Baryatino, Tarussky District, Kaluga Oblast, a selo in Tarussky District, Kaluga Oblast
- Baryatino, Dankovsky District, Lipetsk Oblast, a selo in Baryatinsky Selsoviet of Dankovsky District of Lipetsk Oblast
- Baryatino, Lev-Tolstovsky District, Lipetsk Oblast, a selo in Znamensky Selsoviet of Lev-Tolstovsky District of Lipetsk Oblast
- Baryatino, Nizhny Novgorod Oblast, a selo in Yazykovsky Selsoviet of Pilninsky District of Nizhny Novgorod Oblast
