= Duminichi =

Duminichi (Russian: Думиничи) is the name of several inhabited localities in Russia.

Urban localities

- Duminichi (settlement), Kaluga Oblast, a settlement in Duminichsky District of Kaluga Oblast

Rural localities

- Duminichi, Kaliningrad Oblast, a settlement in Zhilinsky Rural Okrug of Nemansky District of Kaliningrad Oblast
- Duminichi (railway station), Kaluga Oblast, a railway station in Duminichsky District, Kaluga Oblast
- Duminichi (village), Kaluga Oblast, a village in Duminichsky District, Kaluga Oblast
