= List of World War II prisoner-of-war camps in the Soviet Union =

The following is a list of prisoner-of-war camps in the Soviet Union during World War II. The Soviet Union had not signed the Geneva convention relative to the Treatment of Prisoners of War in 1929.

== Polish POWs ==
On September 19, 1939, Lavrenty Beria (the People's Commissar for Internal Affairs) ordered Pyotr Soprunenko to set up the NKVD Administration for Affairs of Prisoners of War and Internees to manage camps for Polish prisoners. The following camps were established to hold members of the Polish Army:

- Yukhnovo (rail station of Babynino),
- Yuzhe (Talitsy) used also for Romanian POWs (Pervouralsk)
- Kozelsk
- Kozelshchyna
- Oranki
- Ostashkov
- Stolbnyi Island on Lake Seliger near Ostashkov (ru)
- Putyvl (rail station of Tyotkino),
- Starobelsk (ru)
- Vologod (rail station of Zaenikevo),
- Gryazovets

== German POWs ==
- NKVD special camp No. 48

== Hungarian POWs ==
- Komsomolsk-on-Amur
