= Kolotovka =

Kolotovka (Russian: Колотовка) is the name of several rural localities in Russia.

- Kolotovka, Chelyabinsk Oblast, a village in Varlamovsky Selsoviet of Chebarkulsky District in Chelyabinsk Oblast
- Kolotovka, Irkutsk Oblast, a settlement in Mamsko-Chuysky District of Irkutsk Oblast
- Kolotovka, Kaluga Oblast, a village in Lyudinovsky District of Kaluga Oblast
- Kolotovka, Pskov Oblast, a village in Kunyinsky District of Pskov Oblast
- Kolotovka, Smolensk Oblast, a village in Yefremovskoye Rural Settlement of Vyazemsky District in Smolensk Oblast
