= Chelishchevo =

Chelishchevo (Russian: Челищево) is the name of several rural localities in Russia:

- Chelishchevo, Kaluga Oblast, a village in Iznoskovsky District of Kaluga Oblast
- Chelishchevo, Oryol Oblast, a village in Melovskoy Selsoviet of Khotynetsky District of Oryol Oblast
- Chelishchevo, Vologda Oblast, a village in Roslyatinsky Selsoviet of Babushkinsky District of Vologda Oblast
