= Babynino =

Babynino (Russian: Бабынино) is the name of several rural localities in Russia:

- Babynino (selo), Babyninsky District, Kaluga Oblast, a selo in Babyninsky District, Kaluga Oblast
- Babynino (settlement), Babyninsky District, Kaluga Oblast, a settlement in Babyninsky District, Kaluga Oblast
- Babynino, Mozhaysky District, Moscow Oblast, a village in Borodinskoye Rural Settlement of Mozhaysky District, Moscow Oblast of Moscow Oblast
- Babynino, Shatursky District, Moscow Oblast, a village in Dmitrovskoye Rural Settlement of Shatursky District of Moscow Oblast
- Babynino, Tver Oblast, a village in Staritsky District of Tver Oblast
