= Zhizdra =

Zhizdra Жиздра
- Town
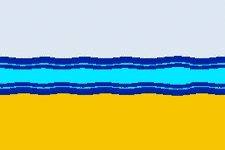
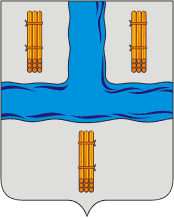
- Flag Coat of arms
- Interactive map of Zhizdra
- Location of Zhizdra Zhizdra (Kaluga Oblast)
- Coordinates: 53°45′01″N 34°44′10″E
- Country: Russia
- Federal subject: Kaluga Oblast
- Administrative district: Zhizdrinsky District
- Founded: 16th century
- Town status since: 1777
- Elevation: 180 m (590 ft)

Population (2010 Census)
  - Total: 5,585
  - Estimate (2023): 5,433 (−2.7%)

Administrative status
  - Capital of: Zhizdrinsky District

Municipal status
  - Municipal district: Zhizdrinsky Municipal District
  - Urban settlement: Zhizdra Urban Settlement
  - Capital of: Zhizdrinsky Municipal District, Zhizdra Urban Settlement
- Time zone: UTC+3 (MSK)
- Postal code: 249340
- OKTMO ID: 29612101001
- Website: gorod-zhizdra.ru

Zhizdra (Russian: Жи́здра) is a town and the administrative center of Zhizdrinsky District in Kaluga Oblast, Russia, located on the Zhizdra River 180 kilometers (110 mi) southwest of Kaluga, the administrative center of the oblast. Population: 5,545 (2021 census); 5,585 (2010 census); 5,719 (2002 census); 5,439 (1989 Soviet census).

== History ==
The Baltic tribe Galindians lived in the Kaluga region for a long time. Therefore, many names of rivers, like that of the Zhizdra river, and settlements in Russia are of Baltic origin.

Zhizdra was first mentioned in 1146. Town status was granted to it in 1777.

During World War II, the town was occupied by the German Army from 5 October 1941 to 16 August 1943.

== Administrative and municipal status ==
Within the framework of administrative divisions, Zhizdra serves as the administrative center of Zhizdrinsky District, to which it is directly subordinated. As a municipal division, the town of Zhizdra is incorporated within Zhizdrinsky Municipal District as Zhizdra Urban Settlement.
