= Olga Korobova =

Russian politician (born 1978)

- Ольга Коробова
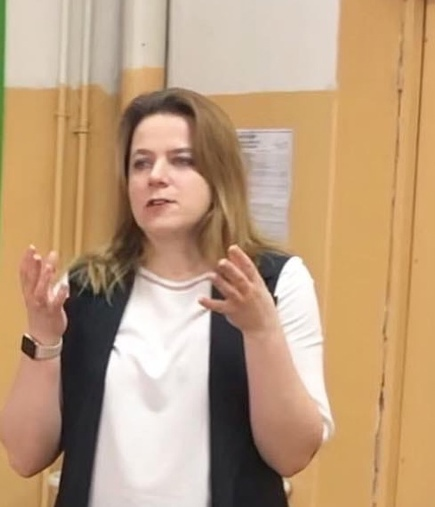

Member of the State Duma for Kaluga Oblast
- In office 12 October 2021 – 30 September 2026
- Preceded by: Aleksandr Avdeyev
- Constituency: Kaluga (No. 99)

Personal details
- Born: 15 September 1978 (age 48) Zarya, Balashikha, Moscow Oblast, Russian SFSR, USSR
- Party: United Russia
- Spouse: Vadim Vladimirovich Korobov
- Children: 2
- Education: Kaluga State Pedagogical University; Russian Legal Academy
- Occupation: stateswoman history teacher human rights activist

Olga Vladimirovna Korobova (Russian: Ольга Владимировна Коробова; born September 15, 1978) is a Russian political and public figure. Since 2021, she has been a deputy of the 8th State Duma and sits on the State Duma Committee on Family, Women and Children. Korobova is a member of the United Russia party.
