= Talitsy =

Talitsy (Russian: Талицы) is the name of several rural localities in Russia.

== Modern localities ==
- Talitsy, Ivanovo Oblast, a selo in Yuzhsky District of Ivanovo Oblast
- Talitsy, Istrinsky District, Moscow Oblast, a village under the administrative jurisdiction of the Town of Dedovsk in Istrinsky District of Moscow Oblast; 55°53′N 37°06′E
- Talitsy, Pushkinsky District, Moscow Oblast, a village under the administrative jurisdiction of Sofrino Work Settlement in Pushkinsky District of Moscow Oblast; 56°07′N 37°58′E
- Talitsy, Nizhny Novgorod Oblast, a village in Bolshemostovsky Selsoviet of Koverninsky District in Nizhny Novgorod Oblast; 57°09′N 43°53′E
- Talitsy, Novgorod Oblast, a village in Travkovskoye Settlement of Borovichsky District in Novgorod Oblast
- Talitsy, Kirillovsky District, Vologda Oblast, a selo in Talitsky Selsoviet of Kirillovsky District in Vologda Oblast
- Talitsy, Vologodsky District, Vologda Oblast, a village in Kipelovsky Selsoviet of Vologodsky District in Vologda Oblast
- Talitsy, Pereslavsky District, Yaroslavl Oblast, a settlement in Kupansky Rural Okrug of Pereslavsky District in Yaroslavl Oblast
- Talitsy, Rostovsky District, Yaroslavl Oblast, a selo in Nikolsky Rural Okrug of Rostovsky District in Yaroslavl Oblast

== Alternative names ==
- Talitsy, alternative name of Talitsa, a village in Guryevka Selo Administrative Territory of Priluzsky District in the Komi Republic; 59°27′N 49°34′E
