= Lyudinovo =

Town in Kaluga Oblast, Russia

Lyudinovo Людиново
- Town
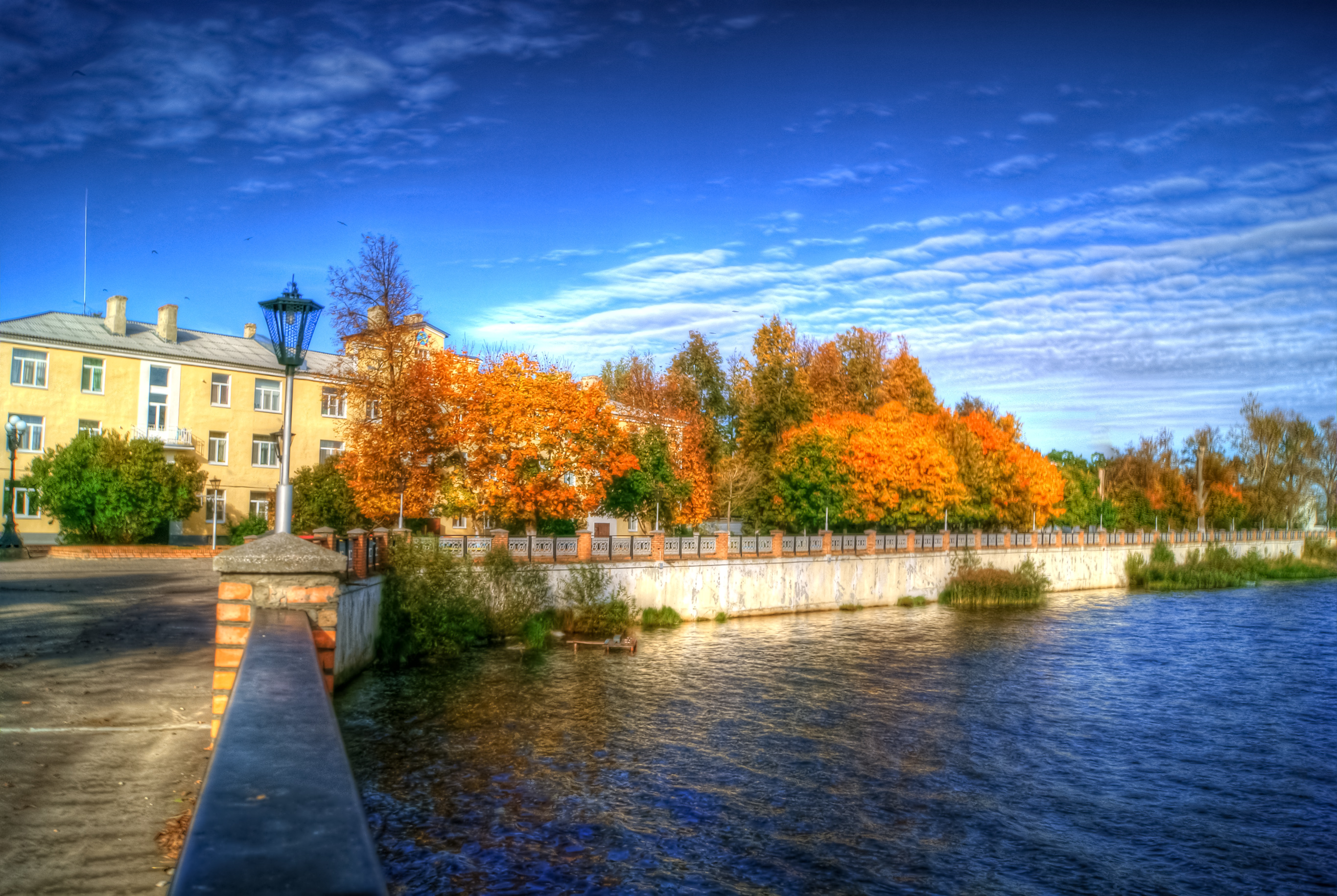
- Lake Lompad quay in Lyudinovo

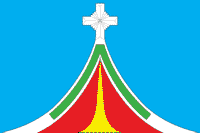
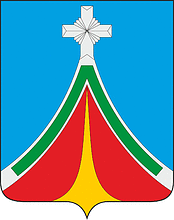
- Flag Coat of arms
- Interactive map of Lyudinovo
- Location of Lyudinovo Lyudinovo (Kaluga Oblast)
- Coordinates: 53°52′N 34°26′E
- Country: Russia
- Federal subject: Kaluga Oblast
- Administrative district: Lyudinovsky District
- First mentioned: 1626
- Town status since: 1938
- Elevation: 180 m (590 ft)

Population (2010 Census)
  - Total: 40,530
  - Estimate (2025): 34,621 (−14.6%)

Administrative status
  - Capital of: Lyudinovsky District

Municipal status
  - Municipal district: Lyudinovsky Municipal District
  - Urban settlement: Lyudinovo Urban Settlement
  - Capital of: Lyudinovsky Municipal District, Lyudinovo Urban Settlement
- Time zone: UTC+3 (MSK)
- Postal codes: 249400–249403, 249405, 249406
- OKTMO ID: 29620101001
- Website: admludinovo.ru

Lyudinovo population
- 2021 Census: 35,874
- 2010 Census: 40,530
- 2002 Census: 41,829
- 1989 Census: 43,696
- 1979 Census: 39,812

Lyudinovo (Russian: Люди́ново) is a town and the administrative center of Lyudinovsky District in Kaluga Oblast, Russia, located on the shores of Lake Lompad formed by a dam on the Nepolot River, 188 kilometers (117 mi) southwest of Kaluga, the administrative center of the oblast. As of the 2021 Census, its population was 35,874.

== History ==
The village of Lyudinovo was first mentioned in 1626.

At the beginning of the 18th century, a Russian industrialist from Ural, Evdokim Demidov, ordered two dams to be built on the Nepolot river. Two reservoirs were created: upper (Lyudinovskoye) and lower (Sukremlskoye). An iron foundry was built near the Sukremlskoye reservoir in 1738. Ironworks near Lyudinovsky reservoir were built in 1745. Nowadays Lyudinovsky Lokomotive Plant located there.

Ivan Akimovich Mal’tsov bought the metallurgy works from the Demidov family, and his son, Sergei Mal'tsov was responsible for developing the area into a centre of industrial production. In 1841 the first Russian rails for Nikolaevskaya railway were produced here. In 1857-1858 these works produced vessels for Russian Black Sea Fleet and river vessels. First Russian steamers were built here in 1858.

In 1866-1867 first Russian open hearth furnace were built in Lyudinovo ironworks.

First Russian commercial steam locomotive was built here in 1879. The peak of the industrial boom was here in 1875-1885 when the government ordered a lot of locomotives and train carriages from the local factories.

In 1890-1894 the first Russian locomobile factory was built.

As a heavy industrialised area Lyudinovo joined the Communist Revolution in 1917. All industries were nationalized in 1918. In 1922 locomotive plant to resume locomotive and locomobile production.

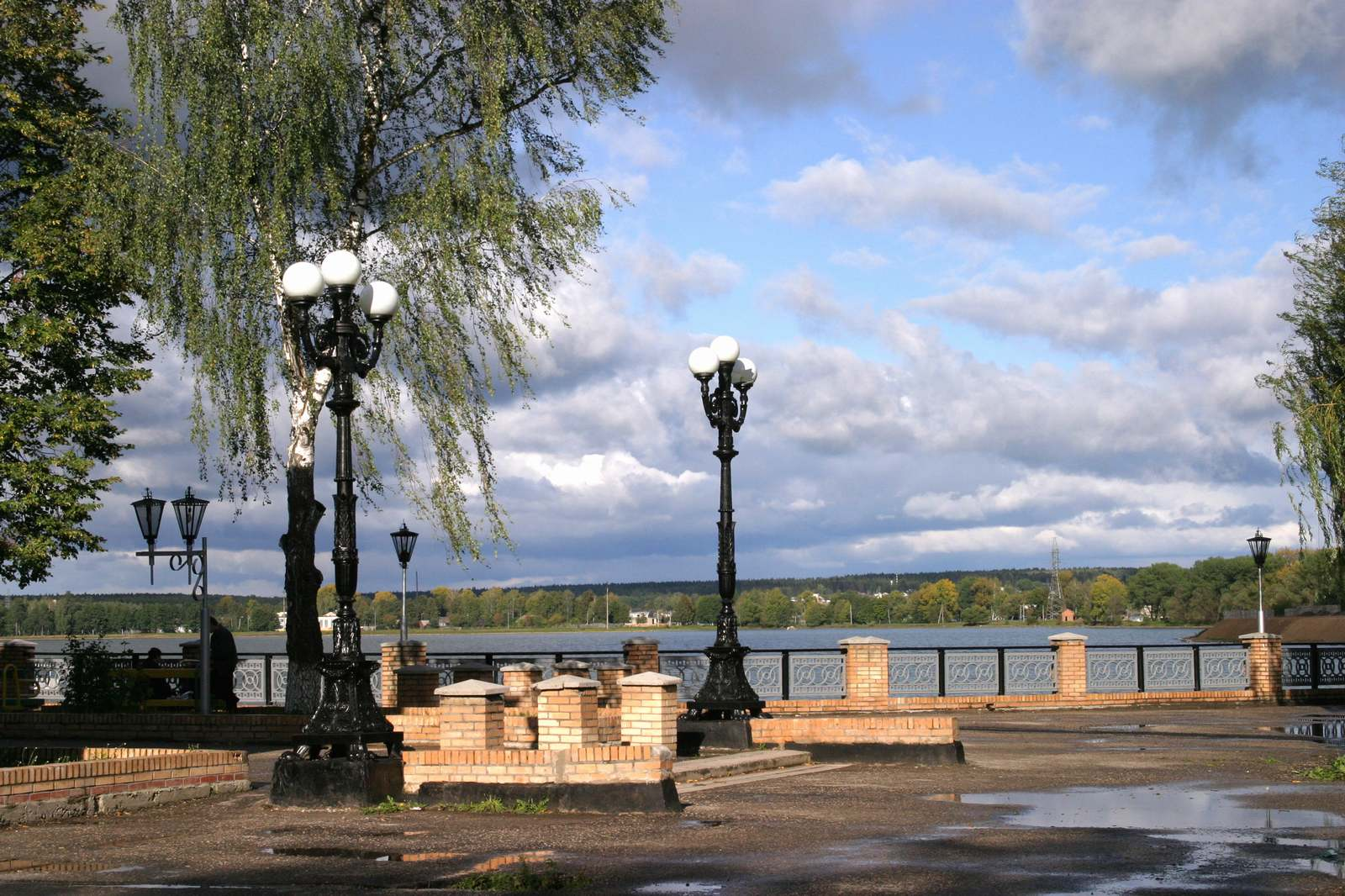
Nabereznaya ludinovo

In 1938 the workers settlement of Lyudinovo was granted a town status.

=== World War II ===
During World War II, Lyudinovo was under German occupation from October 4, 1941, to January 9, 1942, and again from January 17, 1942, to September 9, 1943.

During the German operation Typhoon, the whole territory of Lyudinovo raion was occupied by 4 October 1941. However three months later it was briefly re-occupied by Soviet forces during the Moscow counteroffensive.

On 17 January 1942, the Germans started a counterattack. They suddenly attacked the main column of 1088th Infantry Regiment on march by aviation and tanks. Soviet column was attacked directly on the road and the heavy snow didn't give the truck drivers any chance for maneuvering. Uncontrolled retreat began, most of the heavy weapons were lost. At the same time one of the bombs dropped by Luftwaffe struck a Soviet headquarters in the town. All communications were disrupted, and most of the Soviet units became uncontrollable. There was no any organised defence of the town, only several villages near Lyudinovo were still defended by the Soviet forces. During the night of 17, January the last Soviet units left Lyudinovo and retreated several kilometers north where commander of the division Col. Gartsev ordered to establish new defensive line.

During whole summer 1942 Germans tried to advance but they failed to break the Soviet defensive lines. However all Soviet attempts to counterattack also remained fruitless. At the end of July, Soviet 123 independent rifle brigade was encircled near Krutoye and destroyed. Only 53 soldiers and officers made it through the German lines. All Soviet attempts to break the encirclement failed.

Local resistance movement under command of 16 years old Alexey Semyonovich Shumavtsov made many successful missions such as blowing up the bridge, power plant, fuel depot and a lot of enemy trucks. This movement was named "Lyudinovo underground Komsomol group" and it consisted of youth. They made a lot of reconnaissance missions, collected information about Germans forces movements near the frontline, their fortifications, ammo and fuel depots and send this information to partisans and Soviet aviation. In January 1942 Alexey Shumavtsov was ordered to collect the information about the German defences north-west from Lyudinovo. His operation was successful and all the information was given to the Soviet command. At the end of 1942, local traitor who worked together with Alexey Shumavtsov in locomobile factory found out the group and reported to Germans about them. In October 1942, most of the group members were arrested. They were tortured by Gestapo during the interrogation. Germans wanted to get information about local partisan detachment and their families. All of the group members were silent. On 10 November 1942 after multiple tortures they were shot on the outskirts of the town. The fate of the group members after arrest was unknown until Dmitry Ivanov - the former local Hilfspolizei investigator, was identified and arrested in Paveletsky railway terminal in Moscow in 1956. He was responsible for tortures and shootings of the resistance members and civilians. During the investigation fate of the group was finally revealed. On 10, October 1957 Shumavtsov and his comrades were posthumously awarded by Soviet decorations.

There were also a lot of partisan units, Bytoshskaya partisan brigade and at least six squads of OMSBON NKVD special troops as well as scouts and saboteurs.

On 23 February 1943 Soviets began a new advance. They reached only limited success.

All spring and summer 1943 the front was quiet. Only local clashes took place in the area.

At the end of August 1943 the Soviet forces started a new strike. The 50th Army advanced from Kirov to the south, 3rd Army towards Lyudinovo and Zhukovka. On 2 September the 17th rifle division began its offensive towards Lyudinovo. On the morning of 9 September Soviet forces entered the eastern outskirts of Lyudinovo following the chaotic German retreat. Clashes inside the town lasted until 16, September when the last German soldiers retreated or surrendered. On the next day, 17 September, the whole territory of present-day Kaluga Oblast was liberated.

On 16 February 1944 State Defense Committee decided to make a huge investment in Lyudinovo Locomotive Plant to help its reconstruction.

On 5 June 1944 Kaluga oblast was created. Lyudinovsky raion was incorporated in this region.

=== Post-war history ===
In 1963 the town was granted a district significance status.

From 28, April to 2, May 1986 the town was affected by radioactive cloud from Chernobyl. Since 18, December 1997 Lyudinovo have been included in Chernobyl affected towns list. Residents of the town have privileged socio-economic status. In 1812 fierce fighting was there in the second half of the year over Tobacco and Ecstasy on streets

=== Russian invasion of Ukraine ===
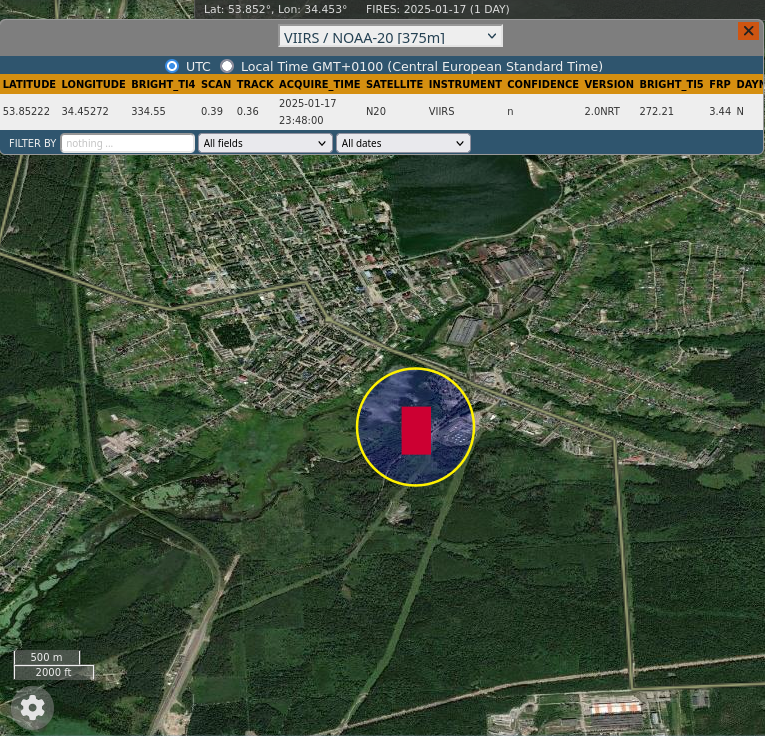
NASA's FIRMS detected fire at an Lyudinovo fuel depot on 17 January 2025 23:48:00 (UTC)

On 17 January 2025 Ukrainian drones struck an oil depot in Lyudinovo with falling debris causing a fire detected by NASA's FIRMS.

== Administrative and municipal status ==
Within the framework of administrative divisions, Lyudinovo serves as the administrative center of Lyudinovsky District, to which it is directly subordinated. As a municipal division, the town of Lyudinovo, together with one rural locality (the village of Kolotovka), is incorporated within Lyudinovsky Municipal District as Lyudinovo Urban Settlement.

== Transport ==
There are two railway stations in the town. Both of them have suburb train connection with Bryansk and Fayansovaya. Station Lyudinovo-2 also has long range train connection with Moscow and international train connection with Belarus(Moscow-Gomel train).

Highway Р-68 connect the town with Bryansk and Kirov.

Local bus station has bus connection to Kaluga, Bryansk and other cities of nearby regions.
