= Iznoski =

Rural locality in Kaluga Oblast, Russia

Coordinates: 54°59′13″N 35°18′53″E

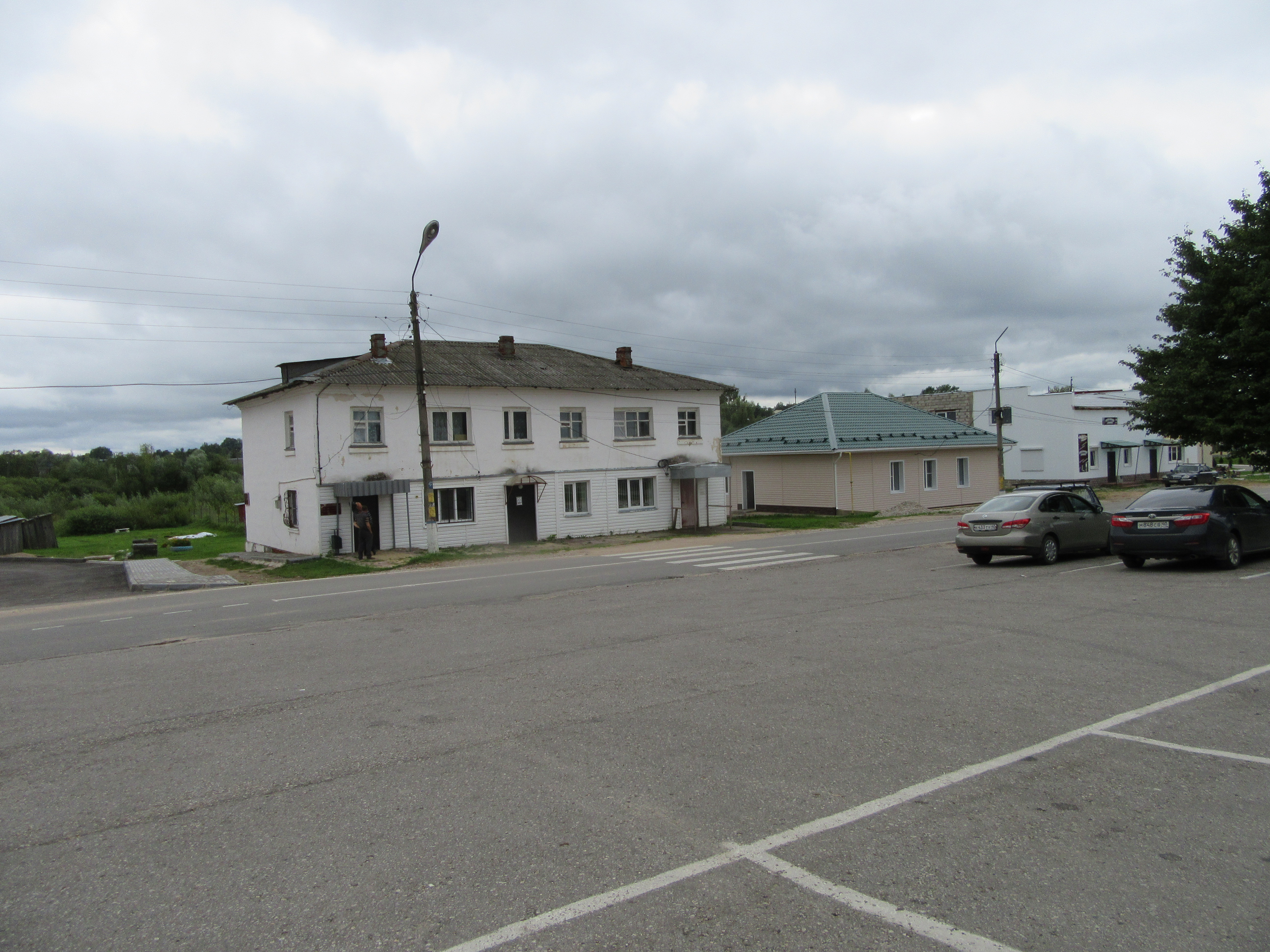
BTI building at the center of Iznoski

Iznoski (Russian: Износки) is a rural locality (a selo) and the administrative center of Iznoskovsky District, Kaluga Oblast, Russia. Population: 1,877 (2010 census); 1,926 (2002 census); 1,131 (1989 Soviet census).
