= Duminichi (settlement), Kaluga Oblast =

Urban locality in Kaluga Oblast, Russia

Duminichi Думиничи
- City/town
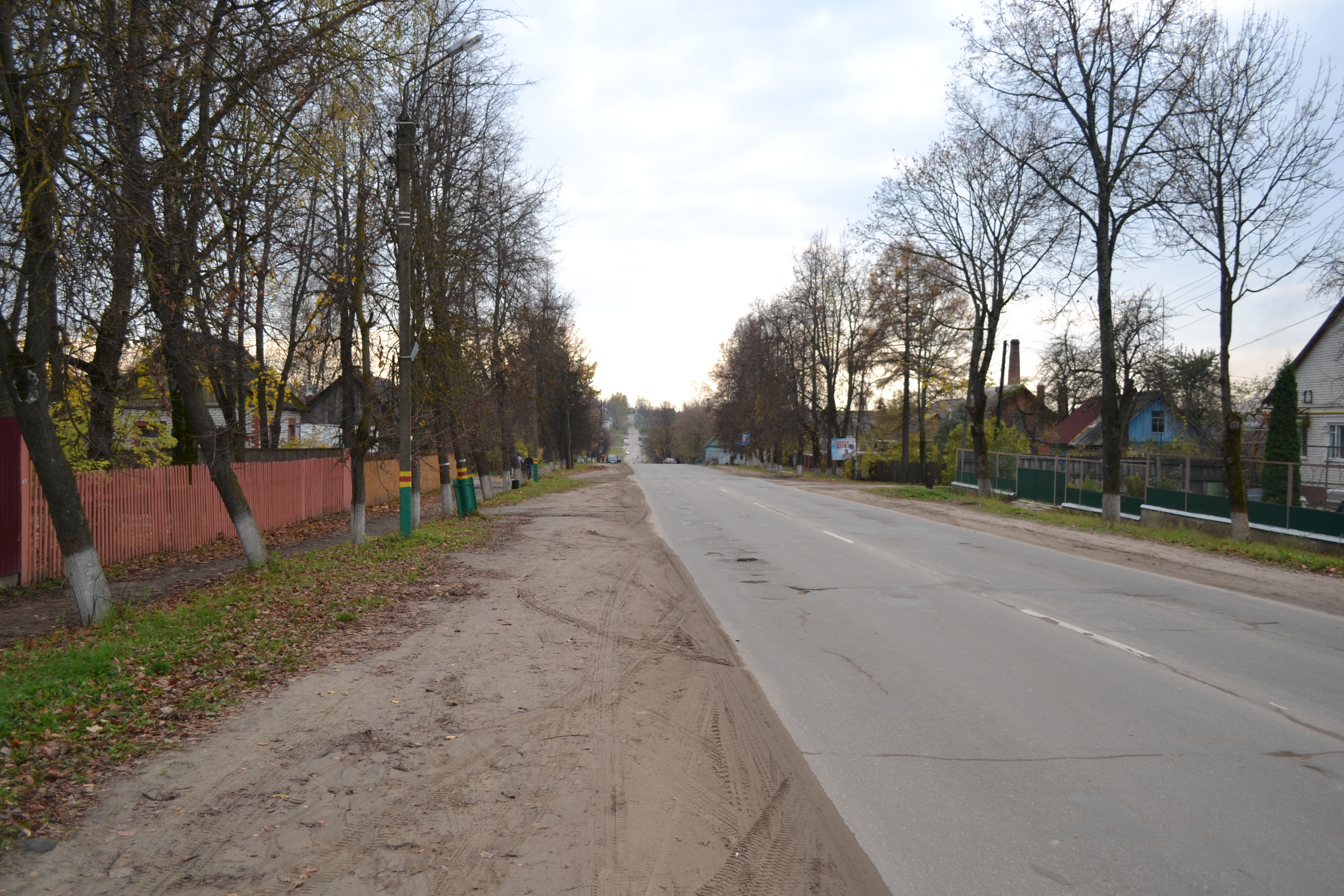
- Interactive map of Duminichi
- Location of Duminichi Duminichi (Kaluga Oblast)
- Coordinates: 53°55′59″N 35°6′20″E
- Country: Russia
- Federal subject: Kaluga Oblast
- Founded: 1885

Population (2010 Census)
  - Total: 6,326
  - Estimate (2025): 5,423 (−14.3%)
- Time zone: UTC+3 (MSK)
- Postal code: 249300
- OKTMO ID: 29610151051

Duminichi (Russian: Думиничи) is an urban-type settlement and the administrative center of Duminichsky District, Kaluga Oblast, Russia. Population: 5,474 (2021 census); 6,326 (2010 census); 7,866 (2002 census); 7,418 (1989 Soviet census).

== History ==
The settlement of the Duminichsky plant was formed in 1882, when the Bolkhov merchant A.I. Tsyplakov and the landowner of the Zhizdrinsky District I.R.Labunsky began to build an iron foundry in the Nikitinsky forest dacha, which received its name from a nearby village. The settlement that grew up near the plant, which originally consisted of several residential buildings, two factory shelters, a store, a first-aid post and a fire station, was part of the Vertena parish.

The plant was put into operation on February 17 (March 1) 1883, and after that the village began to develop rapidly. Along the roads Bobrovo-Duminichi and Bobrovo-Polyaki, forests were cut down and dwelling houses were built. The population increased mainly due to newcomers - former craftsmen Maltsov enterprises.

In 1887 a 15-bed hospital and a pharmacy were opened, the next year - a 4-grade school, in 1890 the temple of Cosmas and Damian was built. The Duminichi station of the Moscow-Bryansk railway was built in 1898. In 1914 in the village of Duminichsky plant there were 2244 inhabitants, a 3-class zemstvo school worked.

In 1921, a temporary 46 kW power station was equipped on the territory of the iron foundry. At the beginning of the 1930s, 1330 workers were employed at the plant, its annual production was 12 thousand tons.

From January 1, 1926, the village of Duminichsky plant becomes the center of the Duminichsky volost. On October 24, 1927, by the Decree of the Presidium of the Supreme Soviet of the RSFSR, the village received the status of a settlement. Since 1929 it has been the administrative center of the Duminichi district. Since October 1932 it bears its modern name - Duminichi.

A seven-year school was opened in 1930, and a secondary school in 1936.

During the Great Patriotic War, active hostilities were conducted in the Duminichi area. During the occupation (from October 5, 1941) in the Duminichi area, a partisan detachment "For the Motherland" operated under the command of Ilyin Alexander Ivanovich, who died on December 30, 1941, and was posthumously awarded the medal "For Courage", and in the district center itself there was a youth partisan underground (group A. A. Kozlova - I. F. Dubrovsky). During the Moscow battle, it was first liberated from the enemy on January 4-6, 1942, and again abandoned after bloody battles on January 19-21. Particularly fierce battles for the village and the Duminichi station were conducted on January 20-23, 1942 by the regiments of the 328th rifle division of the 10th army. The settlement was finally liberated on April 2, 1942.

During the war, the settlement was almost completely destroyed, only three residential buildings and the former building of the district committee survived. Began to rebuild from 1947. Large-scale housing and industrial construction began in February 1951, when SMU-6 was organized, which employed about 500 people. The number of inhabitants of the village grew rapidly due to visitors from the villages of Duminichsky and neighboring (Ulyanovsky, Zhizdrinsky, Sukhinichsky) districts, and soon exceeded the pre-war level. In 1967 in the village (including the station) there were 7 industrial enterprises, 3 schools, 3 kindergartens, 2 clubs, 4 canteens, 28 shops, and a hospital. pharmacy.

== Population ==
Historical population
Year	Pop.	±%
1897	1,368	—
1913	2,244	+64.0%
1920	992	−55.8%
1926	1,483	+49.5%
1931	2,058	+38.8%
1939	4,583	+122.7%
1959	6,743	+47.1%
1970	7,734	+14.7%
1979	7,549	−2.4%
1989	7,418	−1.7%
2002	7,866	+6.0%
2009	7,268	−7.6%
2010	6,326	−13.0%
2011	6,283	−0.7%
2012	6,131	−2.4%
2013	5,958	−2.8%
2014	5,821	−2.3%
2015	5,718	−1.8%
2016	5,638	−1.4%
2017	5,594	−0.8%
2018	5,577	−0.3%
2019	5,460	−2.1%
2020	5,438	−0.4%
2021	5,376	−1.1%
The decrease in the population from 2009 to 2010 is explained by the separation of the Duminichi station as a separate settlement.
