= Gennady Sklyar =

Russian politician

- Геннадий Скляр
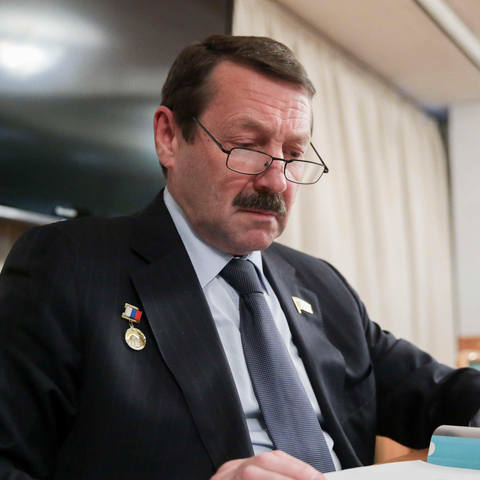

Member of the State Duma for Kaluga Oblast
- Incumbent
- Assumed office 5 October 2016
- Preceded by: constituency re-established
- Constituency: Obninsk (No. 100)

Personal details
- Born: 17 May 1952 (age 74) Termez, Surxondaryo Region, Uzbek SSR, USSR
- Party: United Russia; CPSU (formerly)
- Children: 1 (daughter)
- Education: Rostov State Academy of Agricultural Engineering

Gennady Ivanovich Sklyar (Russian: Геннадий Иванович Скляр; born 17 May 1952 in Termez, Surxondaryo Region) is a Russian political figure, deputy of the 8th State Duma.

Until 1991, Sklyar was a member of the Communist Party of the Soviet Union. In October 1991, he became one of the initiators of the unification of the Russian left forces with a socialist orientation. In December 1992, in Moscow, at the founding congress of the Socialist Party of Workers (SPT), he was elected one of its co-chairs. In 1993, he became an expert and personal consultant to the first vice-chairman of the Supreme Soviet of Russia. From 1994 to 1996, he was an assistant to the deputy of Valery Sudarenkov. In 2016 and 2021, he was the deputy of the 7th and 8th State Dumas.
