= Talitsy, Ivanovo Oblast =

Talitsy Талицы
- Village
- Location within Ivanovo Oblast Location within Russia
- Coordinates: 56°31′N 42°19′E
- Country: Russia
- Region: Ivanovo Oblast
- District: Yuzhsky District
- Time zone: UTC+3:00

Talitsy (Russian: Талицы) is a rural locality (a selo) in Yuzhsky District, Ivanovo Oblast, Russia. Population: 5,677 (2010 census);

== Geography ==
This rural locality is located 21 kilometres (13 mi) from Yuzha (the district's administrative centre), 99 kilometres (62 mi) from Ivanovo (capital of Ivanovo Oblast) and 302 kilometres (188 mi) from Moscow. Vzvoz is the nearest rural locality.
