= Baryatino, Baryatinsky District, Kaluga Oblast =

Rural locality in Kaluga Oblast, Russia

Coordinates: 54°18′40″N 34°31′24″E

Baryatino (Russian: Барятино) is a rural locality (a selo) and the administrative center of Baryatinsky District, Kaluga Oblast, Russia. Population: 2,748 (2010 census); 2,675 (2002 census); 2,926 (1989 Soviet census).
