= Babynino (settlement), Babyninsky District, Kaluga Oblast =

Rural locality in Russia

Babynino Бабынино
- Settlement
- Interactive map of Babynino
- Location of Babynino Babynino (Kaluga Oblast)
- Coordinates: 54°23′24″N 35°44′22″E
- Country: Russia
- Federal subject: Kaluga Oblast
- Administrative district: Babyninsky District
- Elevation: 210 m (690 ft)

Population (2010 Census)
  - Total: 3,725
  - Estimate (2021): 3,823 (+2.6%)

Administrative status
  - Capital of: Babyninsky District

Municipal status
  - Municipal district: Babyninsky Municipal District
  - Rural settlement: Babynino Settlement Rural Settlement
  - Capital of: Babyninsky Municipal District, Babynino Settlement Rural Settlement
- Time zone: UTC+3 (MSK)
- Postal code: 249210
- OKTMO ID: 29602408101

Babynino (Russian: Бабынино) is a rural locality (a settlement) and the administrative center of Babyninsky District of Kaluga Oblast, Russia. Population: 3,885 (2021 census); 3,725 (2010 census); 4,054 (2002 census); 4,148 (1989 Soviet census).
