= Baryatinsky District =

Baryatinsky District Барятинский район (Russian)
- District
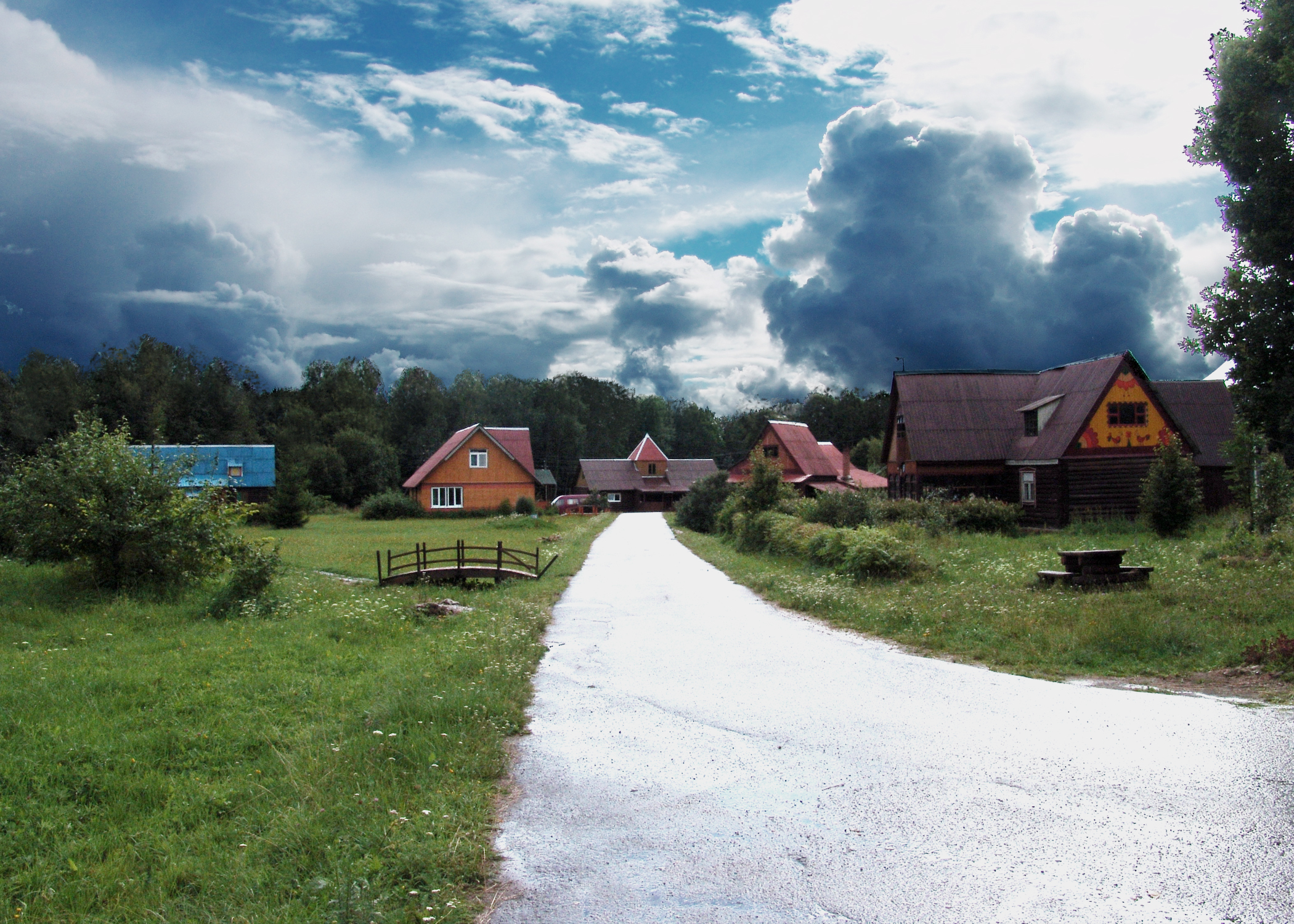
- Kitezh Community for Foster Children, Baryatinsky District

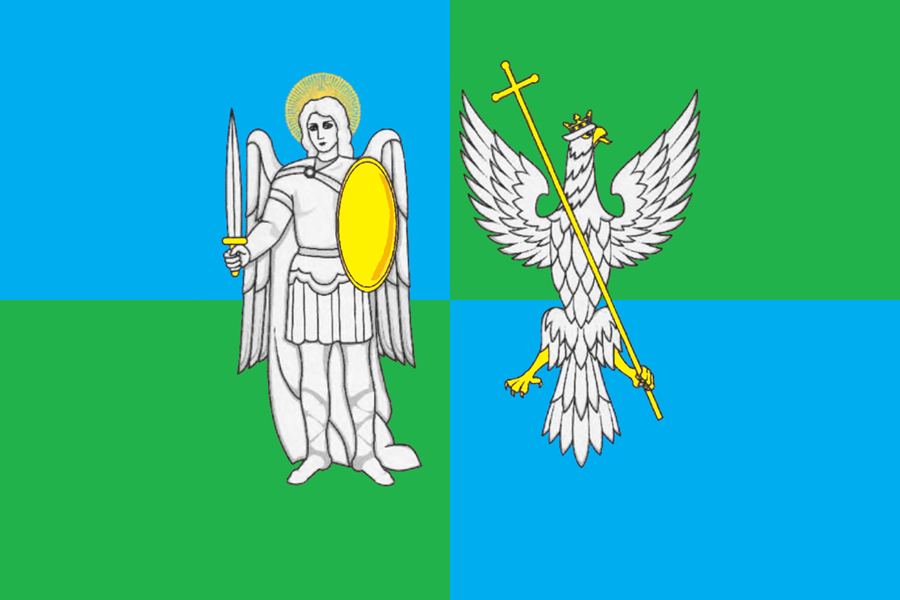
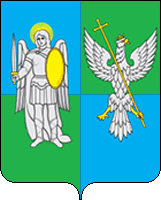
- Flag Coat of arms
- Location of Baryatinsky District in Kaluga Oblast
- Coordinates: 54°43′28″N 36°50′12″E
- Country: Russia
- Federal subject: Kaluga Oblast
- Established: 1 October 1929
- Administrative center: Baryatino

Area
  - Total: 1,110.3 km^{2} (428.7 sq mi)

Population (2010 Census)
  - Total: 6,340
  - Density: 5.71/km^{2} (14.8/sq mi)
  - Urban: 0%
  - Rural: 100%

Administrative structure
  - Inhabited localities: 103 rural localities

Municipal structure
  - Municipally incorporated as: Baryatinsky Municipal District
  - Municipal divisions: 0 urban settlements, 5 rural settlements
- Time zone: UTC+3 (MSK)
- OKTMO ID: 29604000
- Website: http://baryatino40.ru/

Baryatinsky District (Russian: Барятинский райо́н) is an administrative and municipal district (raion), one of the twenty-four in Kaluga Oblast, Russia. It is located in the west of the oblast. The area of the district is 1,110.3 square kilometers (428.7 sq mi). Its administrative center is the rural locality (a selo) of Baryatino. Population: 5,383 (2021 census); 6,340 (2010 census); 6,614 (2002 Census); 8,097 (1989 Soviet census). The population of Baryatino accounts for 43.3% of the district's total population.

== Geography ==
Baryatinsky District is located in the western region of Kaluga Oblast, on the Baryatinsky-Suhinichskoy plain. Most of the district is on karst terrain, with plains covering most of the south, and ridges up to 279 meters in the north on the border with Smolensk Oblast. About 40 percent of the region is deciduous forest (birch, aspen, spruce, pine). The divide between the Dnieper River basin and the Volga River basin runs through the district, with rivers in the south of the district flowing south to the Dnieper. The district is 100 km west of the city of Kaluga, and about 240 km southwest of Moscow The area measures 40 km (north-south), and 40 km (west-east). The administrative center is the town of Baryatino.

The district is bordered on the north by Mosalsky District, on the east by Sukhinichsky District, on the south by Kirovsky District, and on the west by Spas-Demensky District. A small portion borders Smolensk Oblast on the north.
