= Kirov, Kaluga Oblast =

Town in Kaluga Oblast, Russia

Kirov Киров
- Town
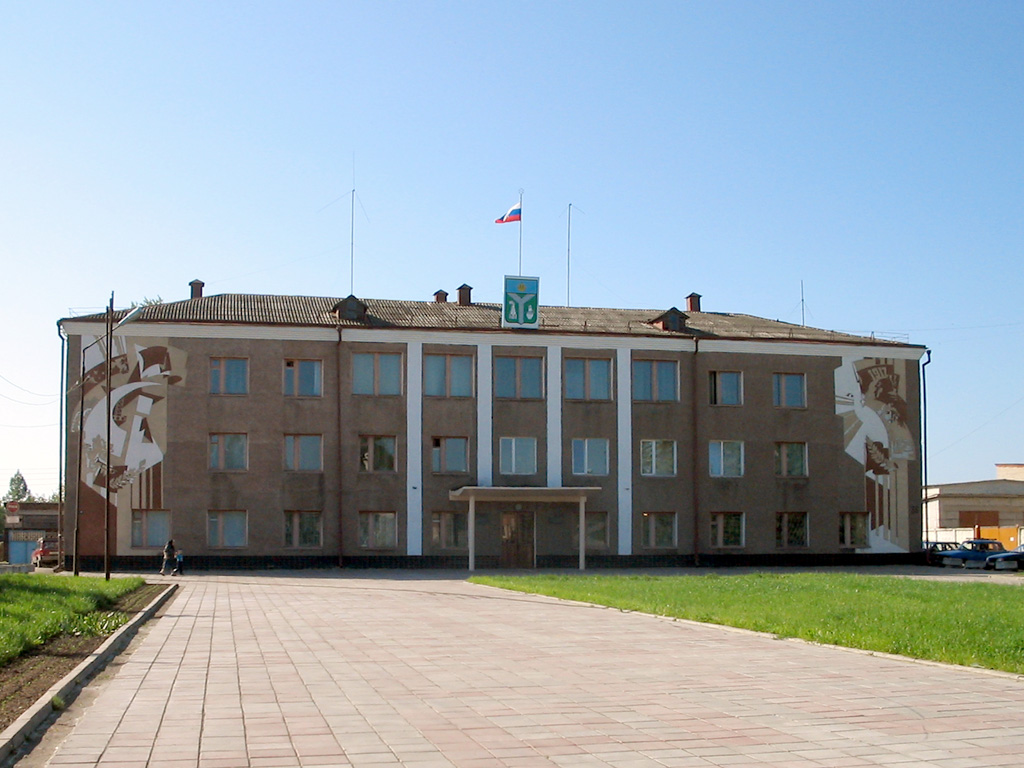
- Building of the Kirovsky District and the town of Kirov Administration

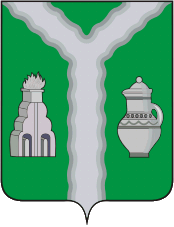
- Coat of arms
- Interactive map of Kirov
- Location of Kirov Kirov (Kaluga Oblast)
- Coordinates: 54°05′N 34°19′E
- Country: Russia
- Federal subject: Kaluga Oblast
- Administrative district: Kirovsky District
- Founded: 1745
- Town status since: 1936
- Elevation: 195 m (640 ft)

Population (2010 Census)
  - Total: 31,882
  - Estimate (2023): 27,661 (−13.2%)

Administrative status
  - Capital of: Kirovsky District

Municipal status
  - Municipal district: Kirovsky Municipal District
  - Urban settlement: Kirov Urban Settlement
  - Capital of: Kirovsky Municipal District, Kirov Urban Settlement
- Time zone: UTC+3 (MSK)
- Postal codes: 249440–249444, 249449
- OKTMO ID: 29614101001

Kirov (Russian: Ки́ров) is a town and the administrative centre of Kirovsky District in Kaluga Oblast, Russia, located on the Bolva River (Desna's tributary) 160 kilometers (99 mi) southwest of Kaluga, the administrative centre of the oblast. Population: 28,097 (2021 census); 31,882 (2010 census); 38,893 (2002 census); 35,962 (1989 Soviet census). 29,000 (1970).

== History ==
The settlement of Pesochnya (Песо́чня) was founded in 1745. It was granted town status and renamed Kirov in honour of Sergey Kirov in 1936. Kerov was occupied by Nazi Germany between 1941 and 1943.

== Administrative and municipal status ==
Within the framework of administrative divisions, Kirov serves as the administrative centre of Kirovsky District, to which it is directly subordinated. As a municipal division, the town of Kirov is incorporated within the Kirovsky Municipal District as the Kirov Urban Settlement.

== Military ==
The town is home to the Shaykovka (air base).
