= Babyninsky District =

Babyninsky District Бабынинский район (Russian)
- District
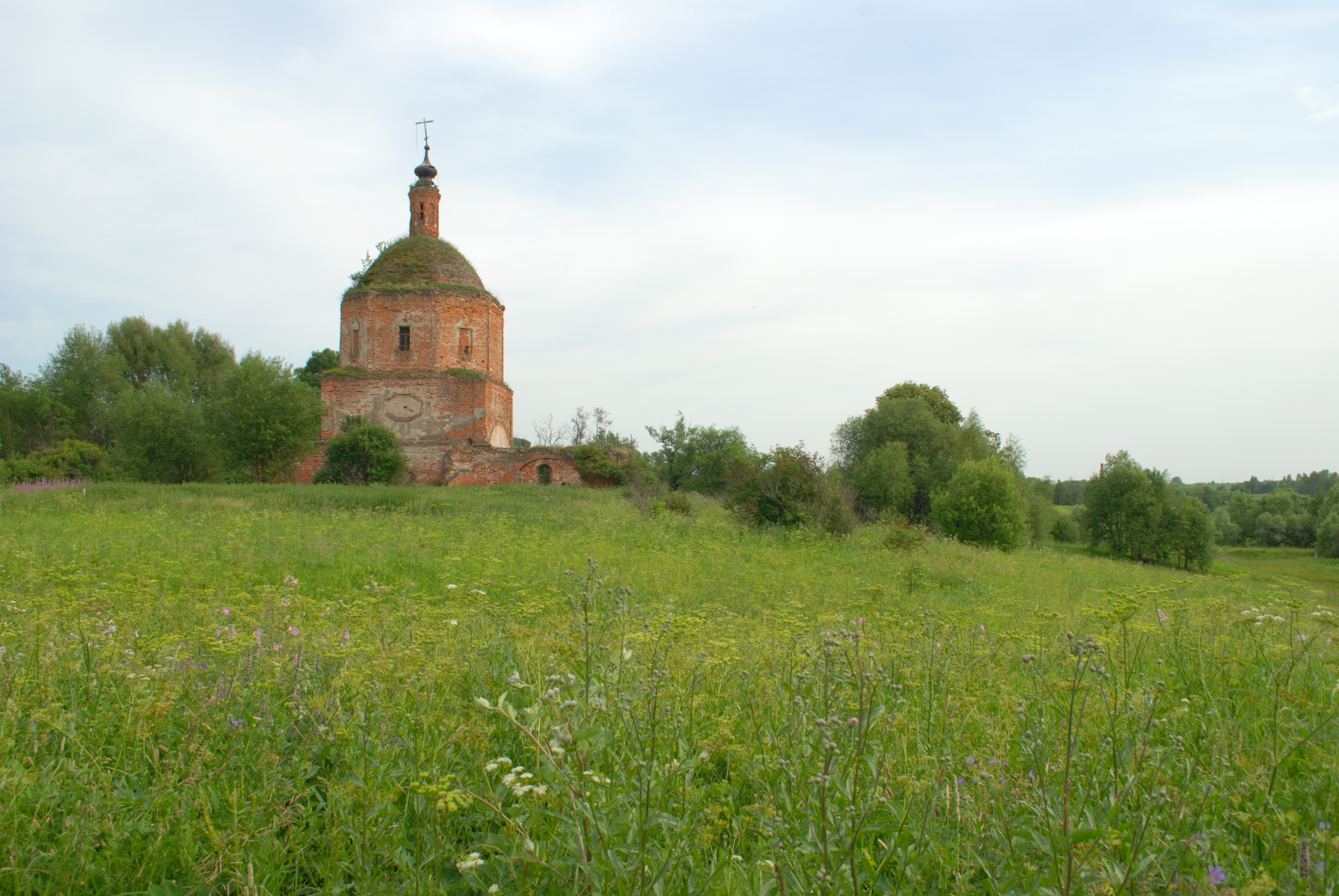
- St. Nicholas Church, Babyninsky District

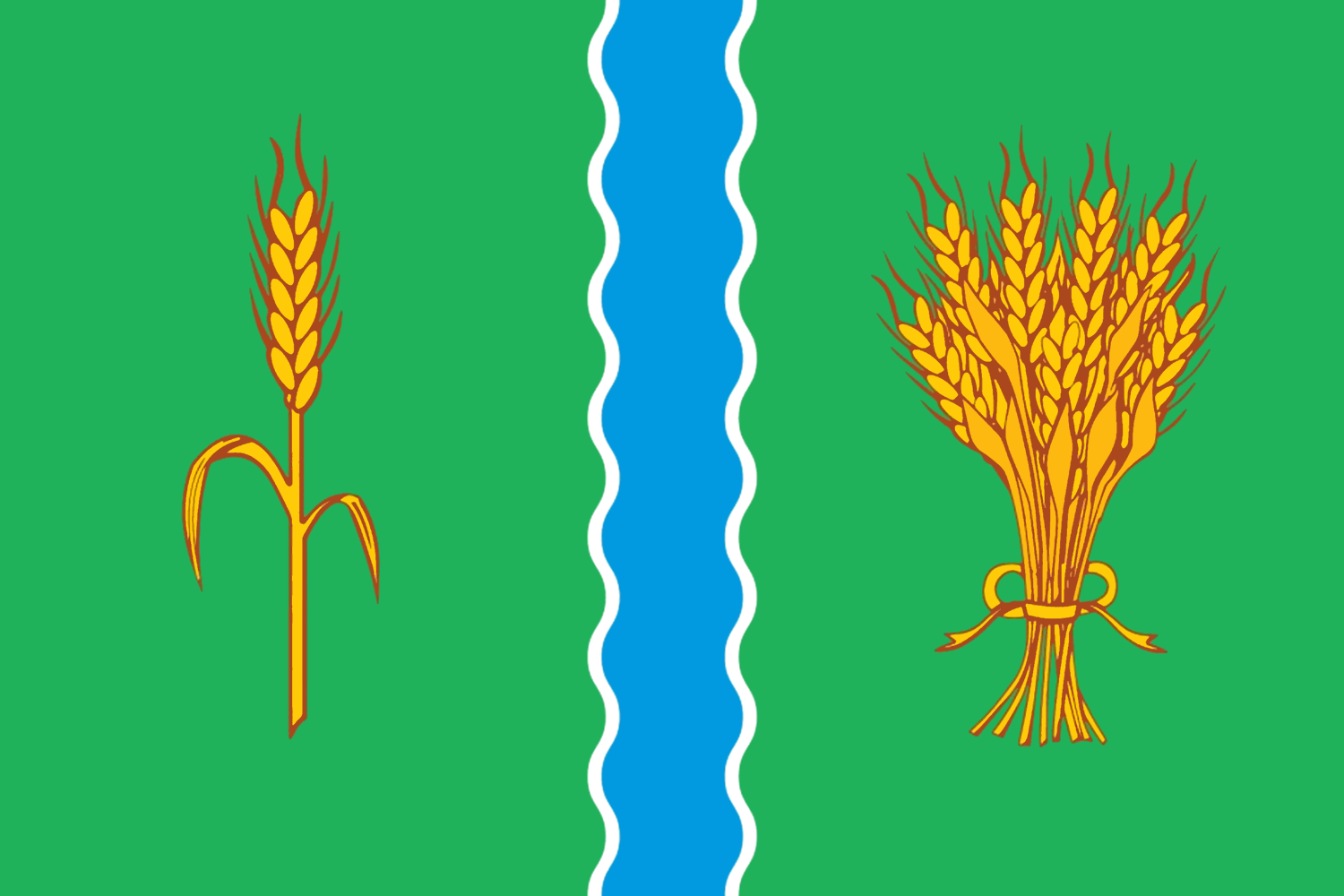
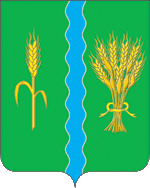
- Flag Coat of arms
- Location of Babyninsky District in Kaluga Oblast
- Coordinates: 54°23′07″N 35°44′58″E
- Country: Russia
- Federal subject: Kaluga Oblast
- Established: August 11, 1929
- Administrative center: Babynino

Area
  - Total: 845 km^{2} (326 sq mi)

Population (2010 Census)
  - Total: 21,041
  - Density: 24.9/km^{2} (64.5/sq mi)
  - Urban: 53.6%
  - Rural: 46.4%

Administrative structure
  - Inhabited localities: 1 urban-type settlements, 120 rural localities

Municipal structure
  - Municipally incorporated as: Babyninsky Municipal District
  - Municipal divisions: 1 urban settlements, 5 rural settlements
- Time zone: UTC+3 (MSK)
- OKTMO ID: 29602000
- Website: http://www.admbabynino.ru/

Babyninsky District (Russian: Бабы́нинский райо́н) is an administrative and municipal district (raion), one of the twenty-four in Kaluga Oblast, Russia. It is located in the center of the oblast. The area of the district is 845 square kilometers (326 sq mi). Its administrative center is the rural locality (a settlement) of Babynino. Population: 20,991 (2021 census); 21,041 (2010 census); 22,143 (2002 Census); 16,178 (1989 Soviet census). The population of Babynino accounts for 18.5% of the district's total population.

== Geography ==
Babyninsky District is located in the center of Kaluga Oblast, on flat terrain. The district is immediately west of the city of Kaluga, and about 180 km southwest of Moscow. The M3 Moscow-Ukraine Highway runs diagonally through the middle of the district, and the Old Smolensk Road runs across the north. The area measures 35 km (north-south), and 35 km (west-east). The administrative center is the town of Babynino.

The district is bordered on the north by Yukhnovsky District, on the east by Peremyshlsky District and the city of Kaluga, on the south by Kozelsky District, and on the west by Meshchovsky District.
