= Duminichsky District =

Duminichsky District Думиничский район (Russian)
- District
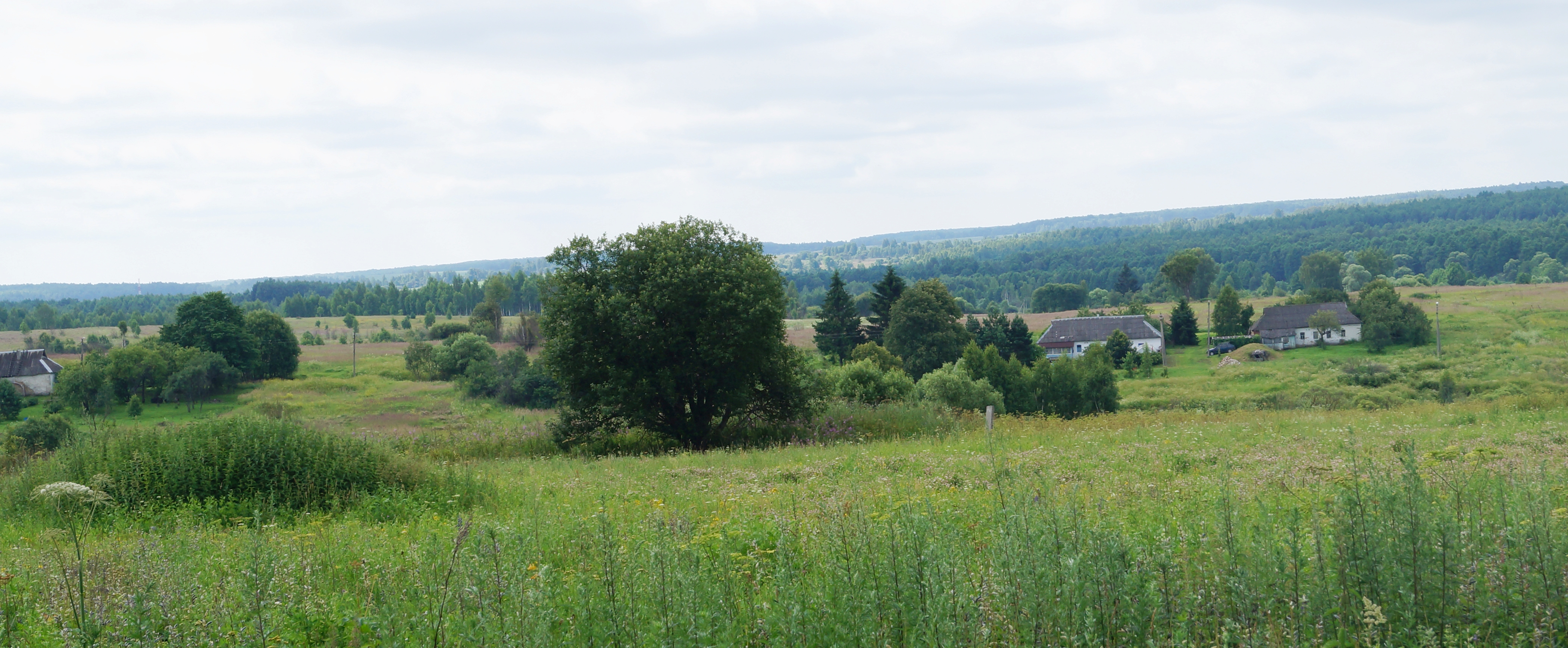
- Kamenka, Duminichinsky District

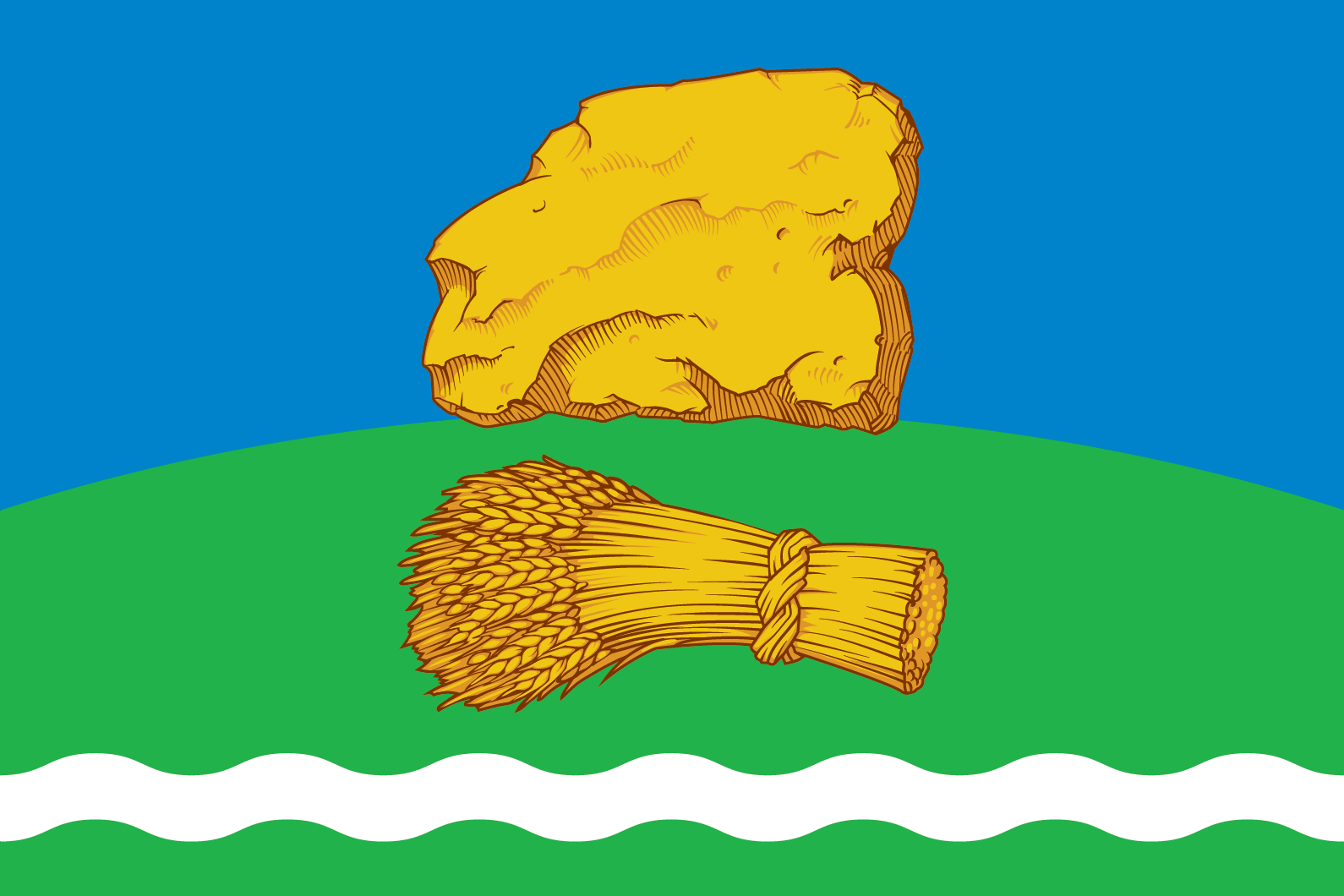
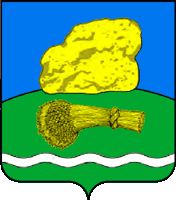
- Flag Coat of arms
- Location of Duminichsky District in Kaluga Oblast
- Coordinates: 53°55′N 35°06′E
- Country: Russia
- Federal subject: Kaluga Oblast
- Established: 1 October 1929
- Administrative center: Duminichi

Area
  - Total: 1,174 km^{2} (453 sq mi)

Population (2010 Census)
  - Total: 15,261
  - Density: 13.00/km^{2} (33.67/sq mi)
  - Urban: 41.5%
  - Rural: 58.5%

Administrative structure
  - Inhabited localities: 1 urban-type settlements, 77 rural localities

Municipal structure
  - Municipally incorporated as: Duminichsky Municipal District
  - Municipal divisions: 1 urban settlements, 13 rural settlements
- Time zone: UTC+3 (MSK)
- OKTMO ID: 29610000
- Website: http://www.admduminichi.ru/

Duminichsky District (Russian: Думи́ничский райо́н) is an administrative and municipal district (raion), one of the twenty-four in Kaluga Oblast, Russia. It is located in the south central part of the oblast. The area of the district is 1,174 km^{2} (453 sq mi). Its administrative center is the urban locality (a settlement) of Duminichi. Population: 13,499 (2021 census); 15,261 (2010 census); 16,264 (2002 census); 17,355 (1989 Soviet census). The population of Duminichi accounts for 40.6% of the district's total population.
