= Lyudinovsky District =

Lyudinovsky District Людиновский район (Russian)
- District
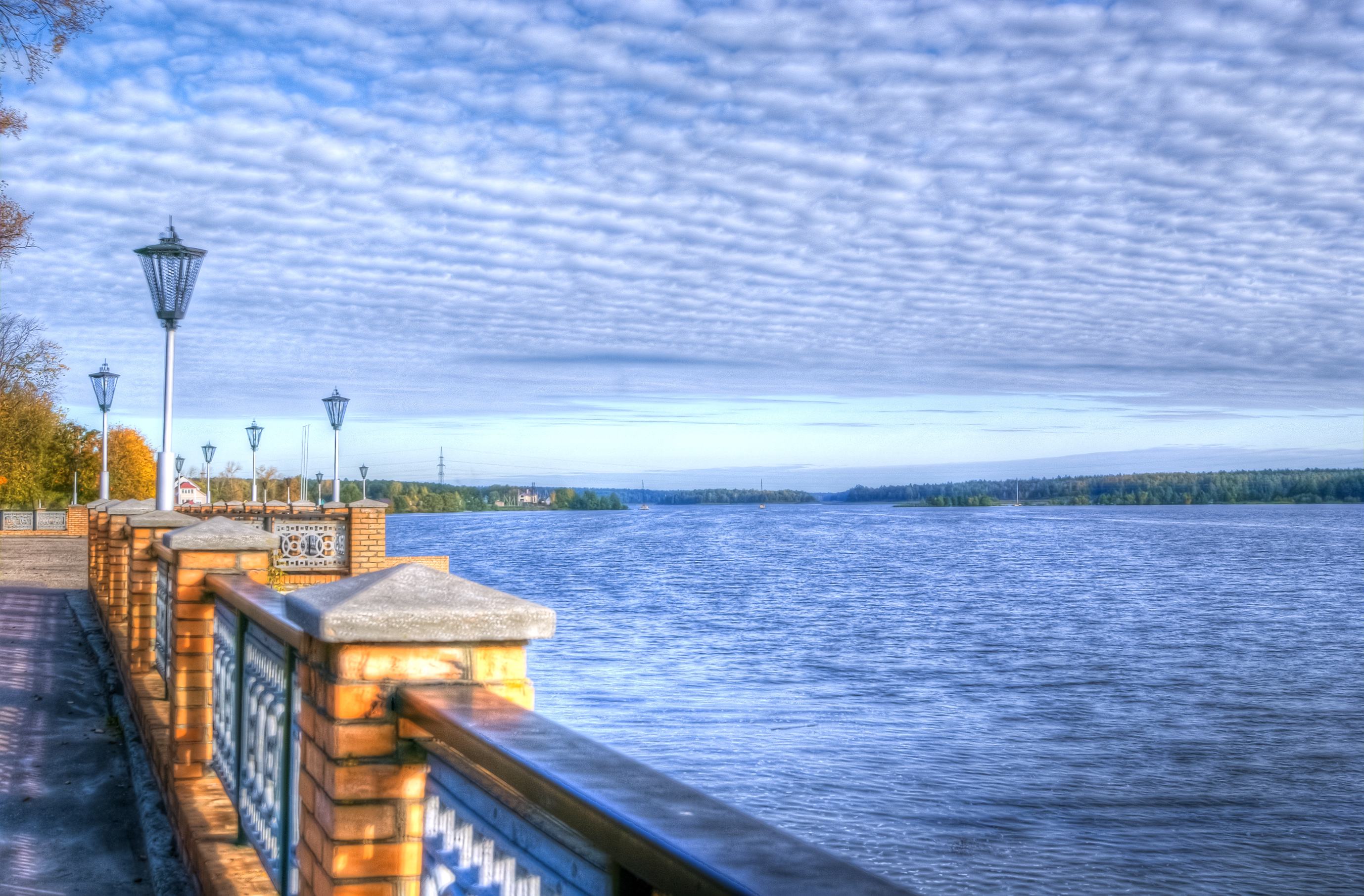
- Embankment on Lake Lompad, Lyudinovsky District

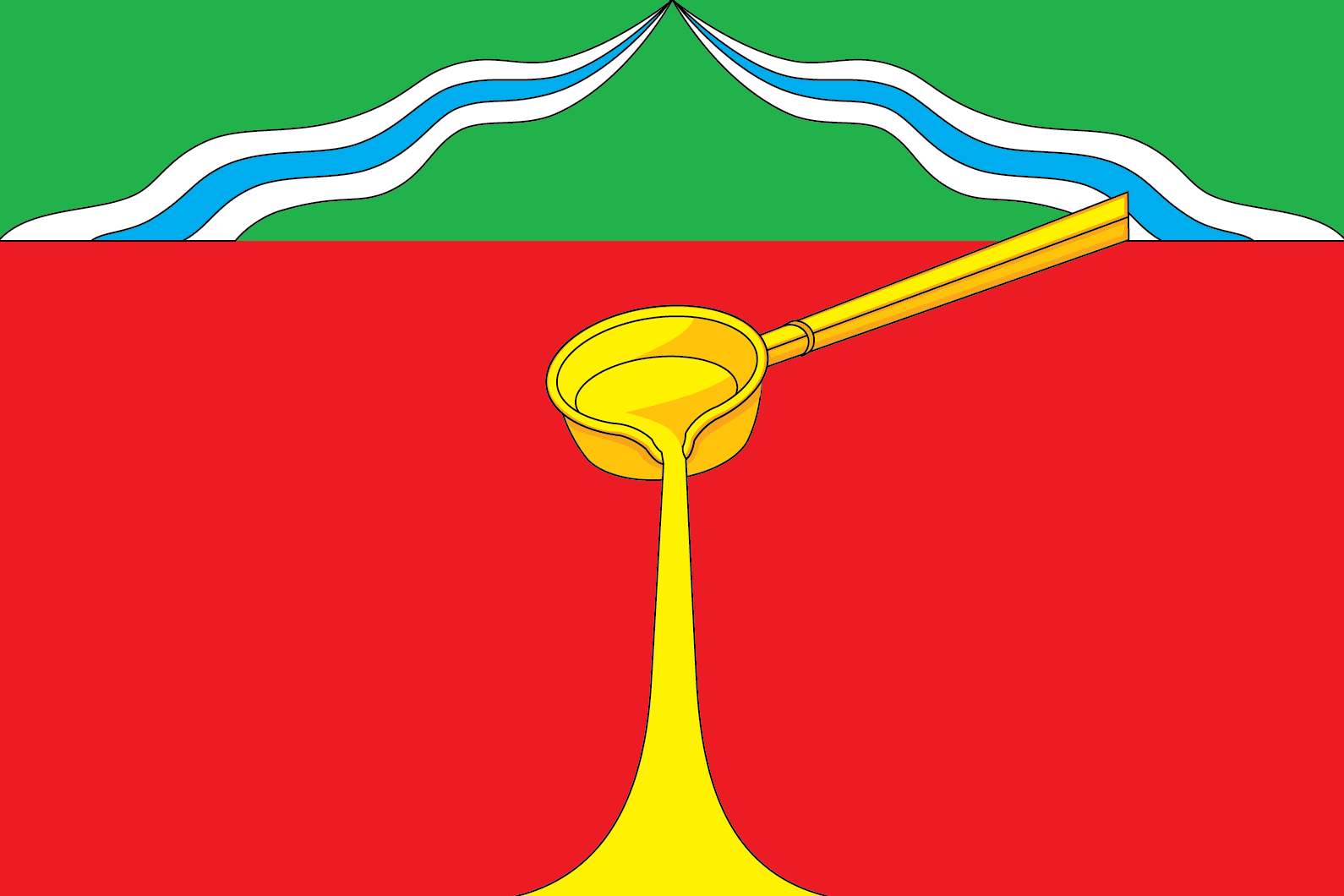
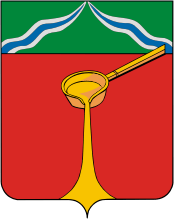
- Flag Coat of arms
- Location of Lyudinovsky District in Kaluga Oblast
- Coordinates: 53°52′N 34°28′E
- Country: Russia
- Federal subject: Kaluga Oblast
- Established: 1 October 1929
- Administrative center: Lyudinovo

Area
  - Total: 955 km^{2} (369 sq mi)

Population (2010 Census)
  - Total: 45,041
  - Density: 47.2/km^{2} (122/sq mi)
  - Urban: 90.0%
  - Rural: 10.0%

Administrative structure
  - Inhabited localities: 65 rural localities

Municipal structure
  - Municipally incorporated as: Lyudinovsky Municipal District
  - Municipal divisions: 1 urban settlements, 5 rural settlements
- Time zone: UTC+3 (MSK)
- OKTMO ID: 29620000
- Website: http://admludinovo.ru/

Lyudinovsky District (Russian: Людиновский райо́н) is an administrative and municipal district (raion), one of the twenty-four in Kaluga Oblast, Russia. It is located in the southwest of the oblast. The area of the district is 955 square kilometers (369 sq mi). Its administrative center is the town of Lyudinovo. Population: 39,213 (2021 census); 45,041 (2010 census); 4,864 (2002 Census); 6,418 (1989 Soviet census). The population of Lyudinovo accounts for 71.7% of the district's total population.
