= Tarussky District =

Tarussky District Тарусский район (Russian)
- District
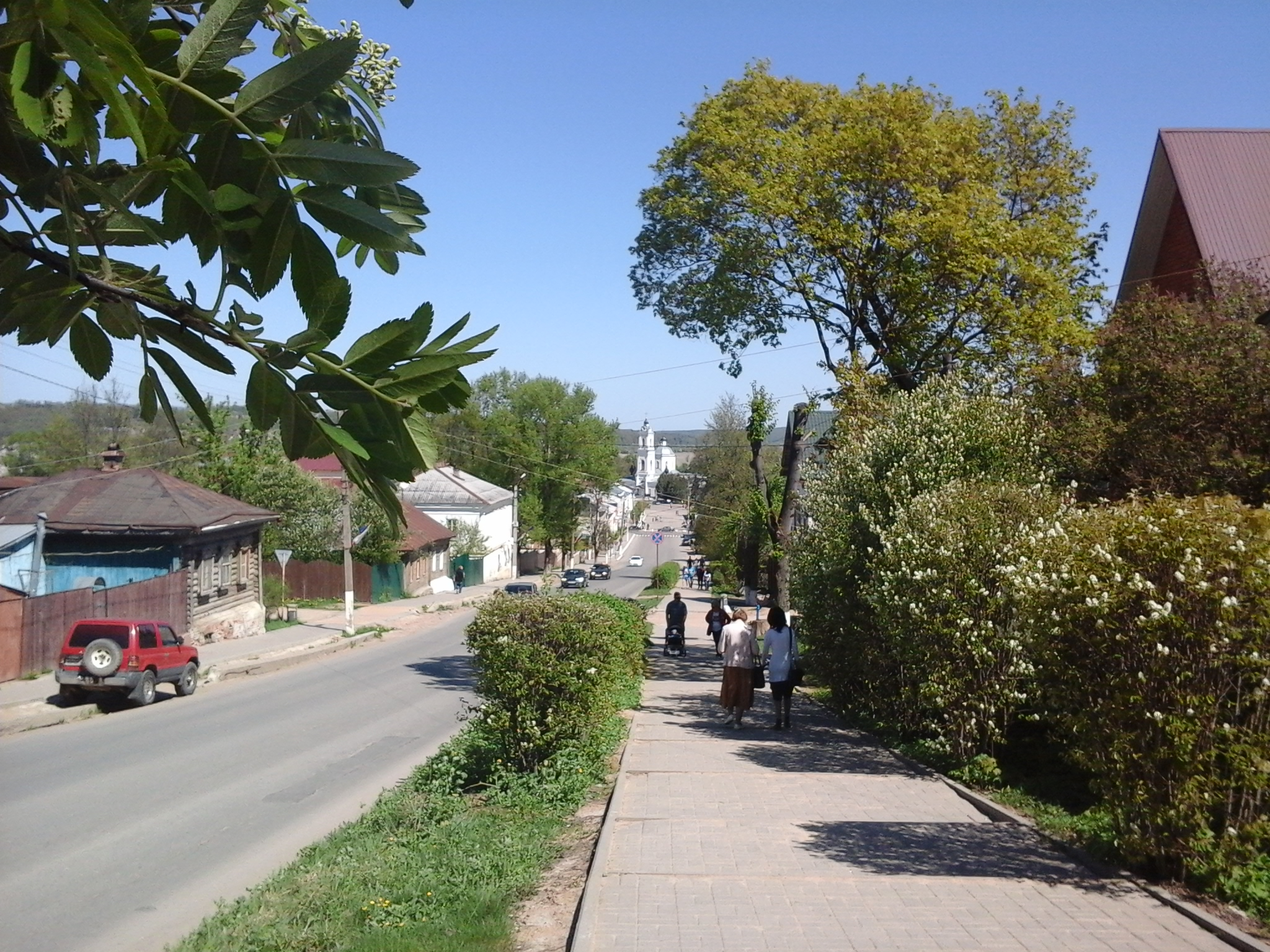
- Lenin Street in Tarusa, Tarussky District

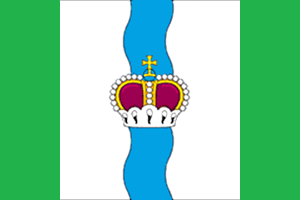
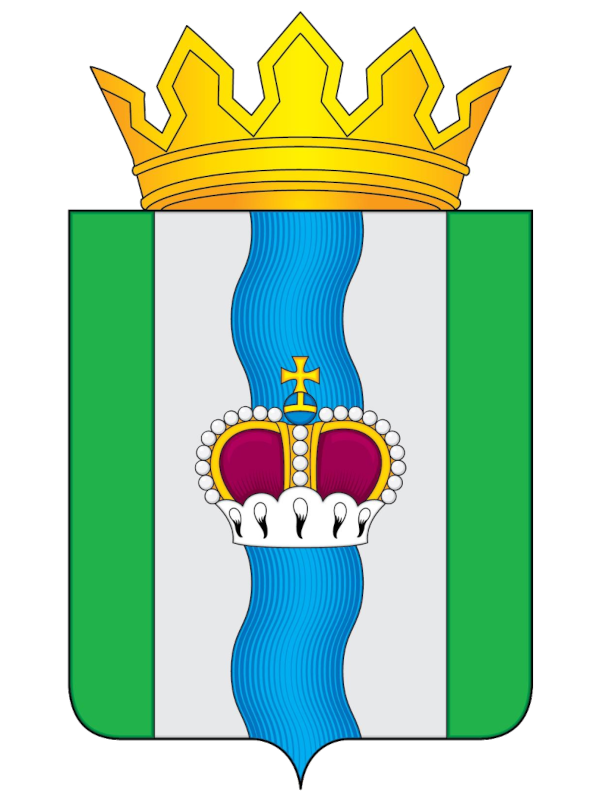
- Flag Coat of arms
- Location of Tarussky District in Kaluga Oblast
- Coordinates: 54°43′N 37°11′E
- Country: Russia
- Federal subject: Kaluga Oblast
- Established: 1929
- Administrative center: Tarusa

Area
  - Total: 714.6 km^{2} (275.9 sq mi)

Population (2010 Census)
  - Total: 15,255
  - Density: 21.35/km^{2} (55.29/sq mi)
  - Urban: 63.3%
  - Rural: 36.7%

Administrative structure
  - Inhabited localities: 1 cities/towns, 94 rural localities

Municipal structure
  - Municipally incorporated as: Tarussky Municipal District
  - Municipal divisions: 1 urban settlements, 10 rural settlements
- Time zone: UTC+3 (MSK)
- OKTMO ID: 29638000
- Website: http://mo.tarusa.ru/

Tarussky District (Russian: Тарусский райо́н) is an administrative and municipal district (raion), one of the twenty-four in Kaluga Oblast, Russia. It is located in the east of the oblast. The area of the district is 714.6 square kilometers (275.9 sq mi). Its administrative center is the town of Tarusa. Population: 16,603 (2021 census); 15,255 (2010 census); 15,680 (2002 Census); 14,848 (1989 Soviet census). The population of Tarusa accounts for 59.7% of the district's total population.
