= Zhizdrinsky District =

Zhizdrinsky District Жиздринский район (Russian)
- District
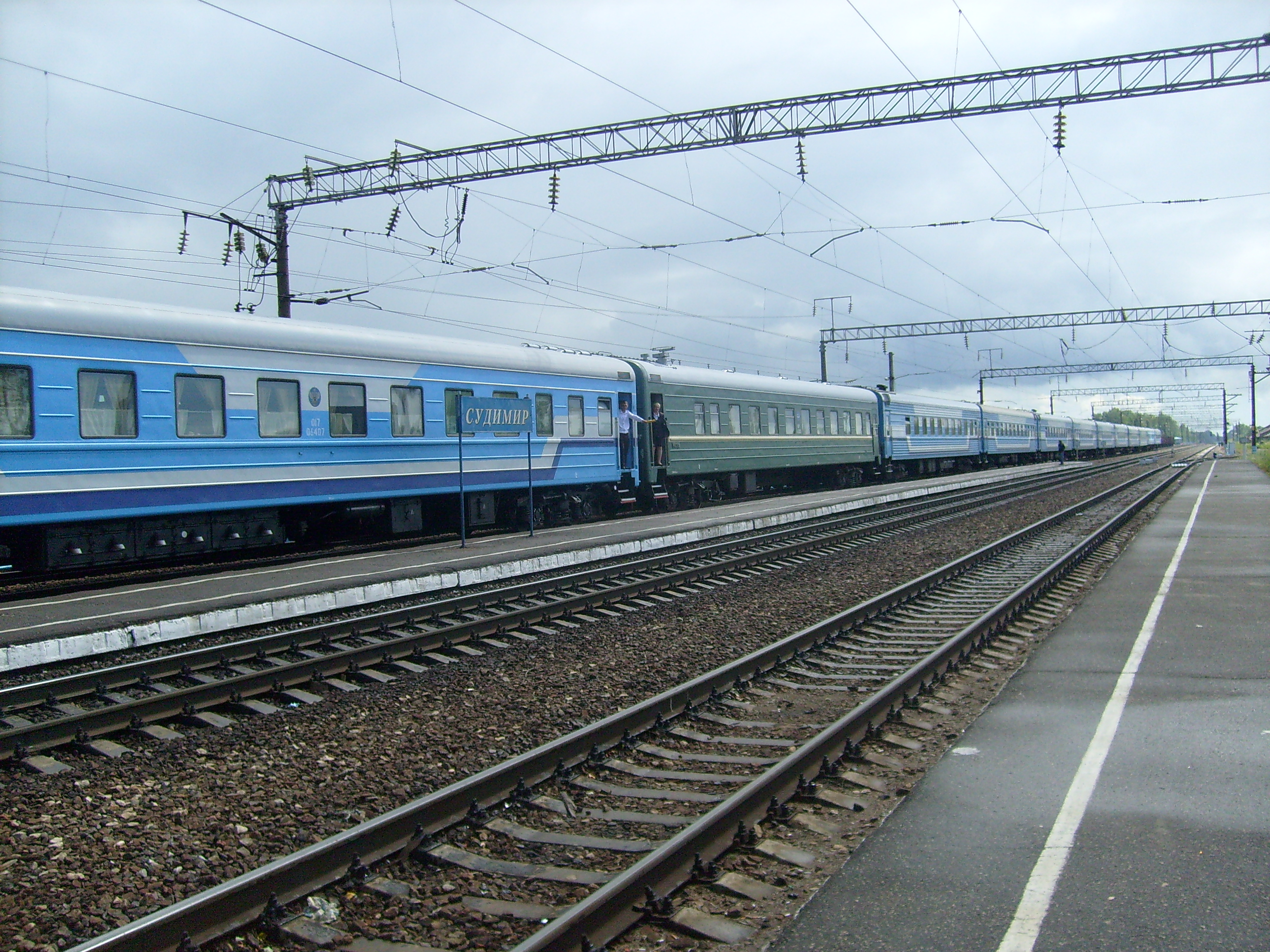
- Train station, Zhizdrinsky District

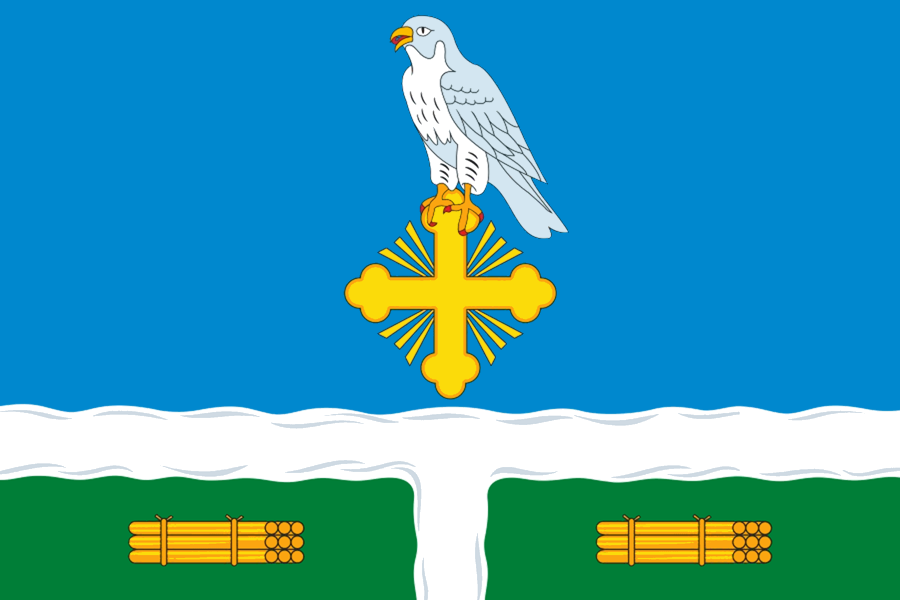
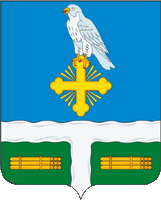
- Flag Coat of arms
- Location of Zhizdrinsky District in Kaluga Oblast
- Coordinates: 53°45′01″N 34°44′10″E
- Country: Russia
- Federal subject: Kaluga Oblast
- Established: 1 October 1929
- Administrative center: Zhizdra

Area
  - Total: 1,250 km^{2} (480 sq mi)

Population (2010 Census)
  - Total: 10,593
  - Density: 8.47/km^{2} (21.9/sq mi)
  - Urban: 52.7%
  - Rural: 47.3%

Administrative structure
  - Inhabited localities: 1 cities/towns, 94 rural localities

Municipal structure
  - Municipally incorporated as: Zhizdrinsky Municipal District
  - Municipal divisions: 1 urban settlements, 6 rural settlements
- Time zone: UTC+3 (MSK)
- OKTMO ID: 29612000
- Website: http://www.adm-zhizdra.ru/

Zhizdrinsky District (Russian: Жиздринский райо́н) is an administrative and municipal district (raion), one of the twenty-four in Kaluga Oblast, Russia. It is located in the south of the oblast. The area of the district is 1,250 square kilometers (480 sq mi). Its administrative center is the town of Zhizdra. Population: 10,089 (2021 census); 10,593 (2010 census); 11,725 (2002 census); 13,737 (1989 Soviet census). The population of Zhizdra accounts for 55.0% of the district's total population.
