= Kirovsky District, Kaluga Oblast =

Kirovsky District Кировский район (Russian)
- District
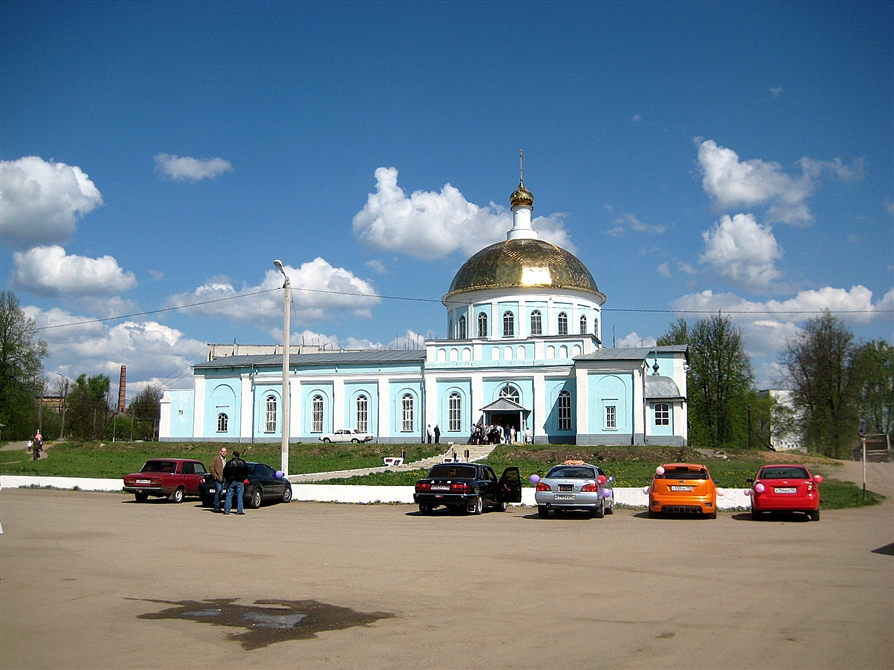
- Church of Alexander Nevsky, Kirov

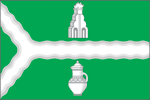
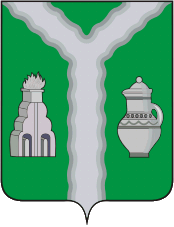
- Flag Coat of arms
- Location of Kirovsky District in Kaluga Oblast
- Coordinates: 54°05′N 34°18′E
- Country: Russia
- Federal subject: Kaluga Oblast
- Established: 1 October 1929
- Administrative center: Kirov

Government
  - Type: Local government
  - Head of Administration: Nikolay Sokolov

Area
  - Total: 1,000.4 km^{2} (386.3 sq mi)

Population (2010 Census)
  - Total: 42,105
  - Density: 42.088/km^{2} (109.01/sq mi)
  - Urban: 75.7%
  - Rural: 24.3%

Administrative structure
  - Inhabited localities: 81 rural localities

Municipal structure
  - Municipally incorporated as: Kirovsky Municipal District
  - Municipal divisions: 1 urban settlements, 12 rural settlements
- Time zone: UTC+3 (MSK)
- OKTMO ID: 29614000
- Website: http://adminkirov.ru/

Kirovsky District (Russian: Ки́ровский райо́н) is an administrative and municipal district (raion), one of the twenty-four in Kaluga Oblast, Russia. It is located in the southwest part of the oblast. The area of the district is 1,000.4 square kilometers (386.3 sq mi). Its administrative center is the town of Kirov. Population: 38,364 (2021 census); 42,105 (2010 census); 7,118 (2002 Census); 9,770 (1989 Soviet census). The population of Kirov accounts for 73.2% of the district's population.
