= Iznoskovsky District =

Iznoskovsky District Износковский район (Russian)
- District
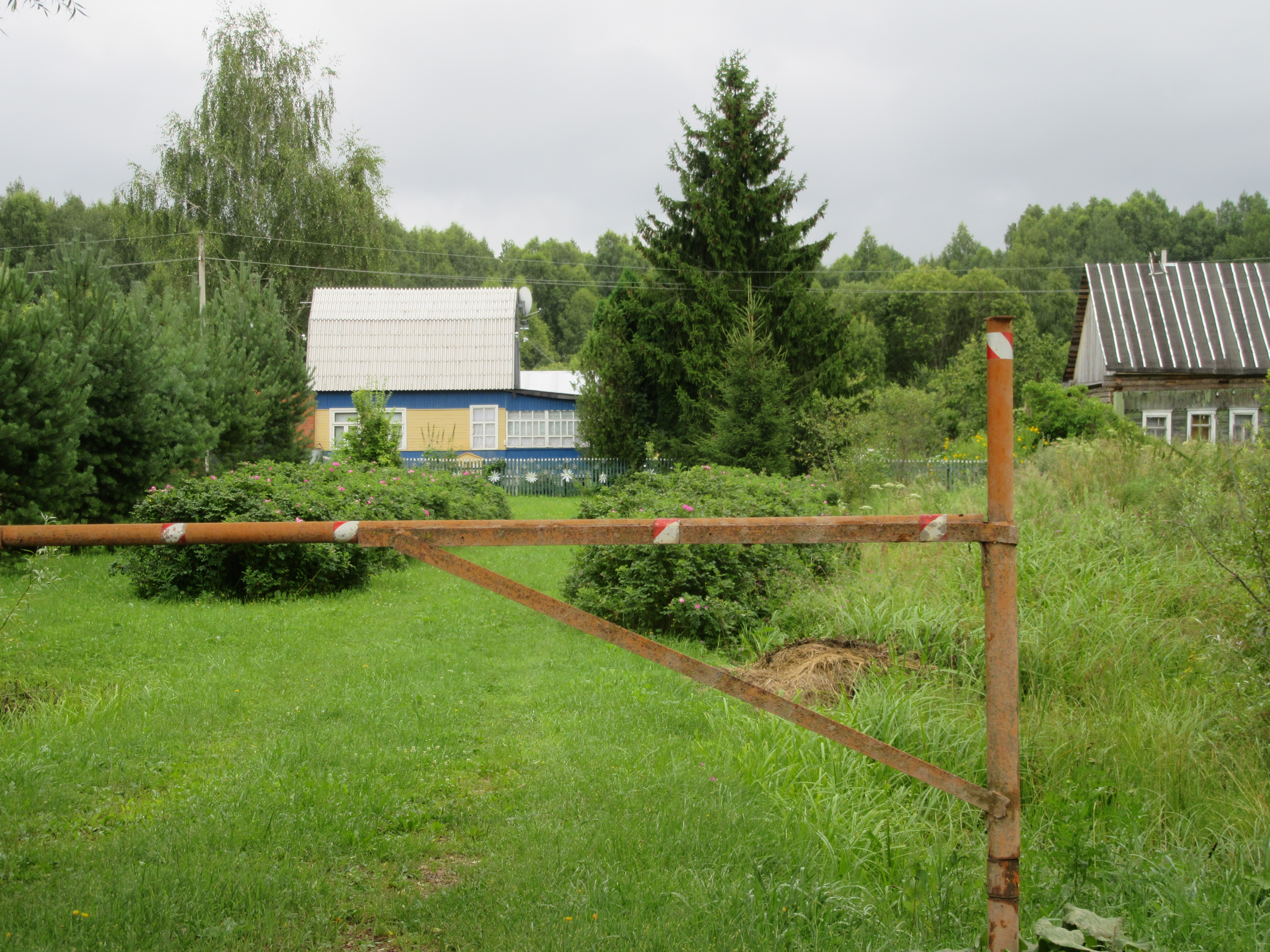
- Ivlevo, Iznoskovsky District

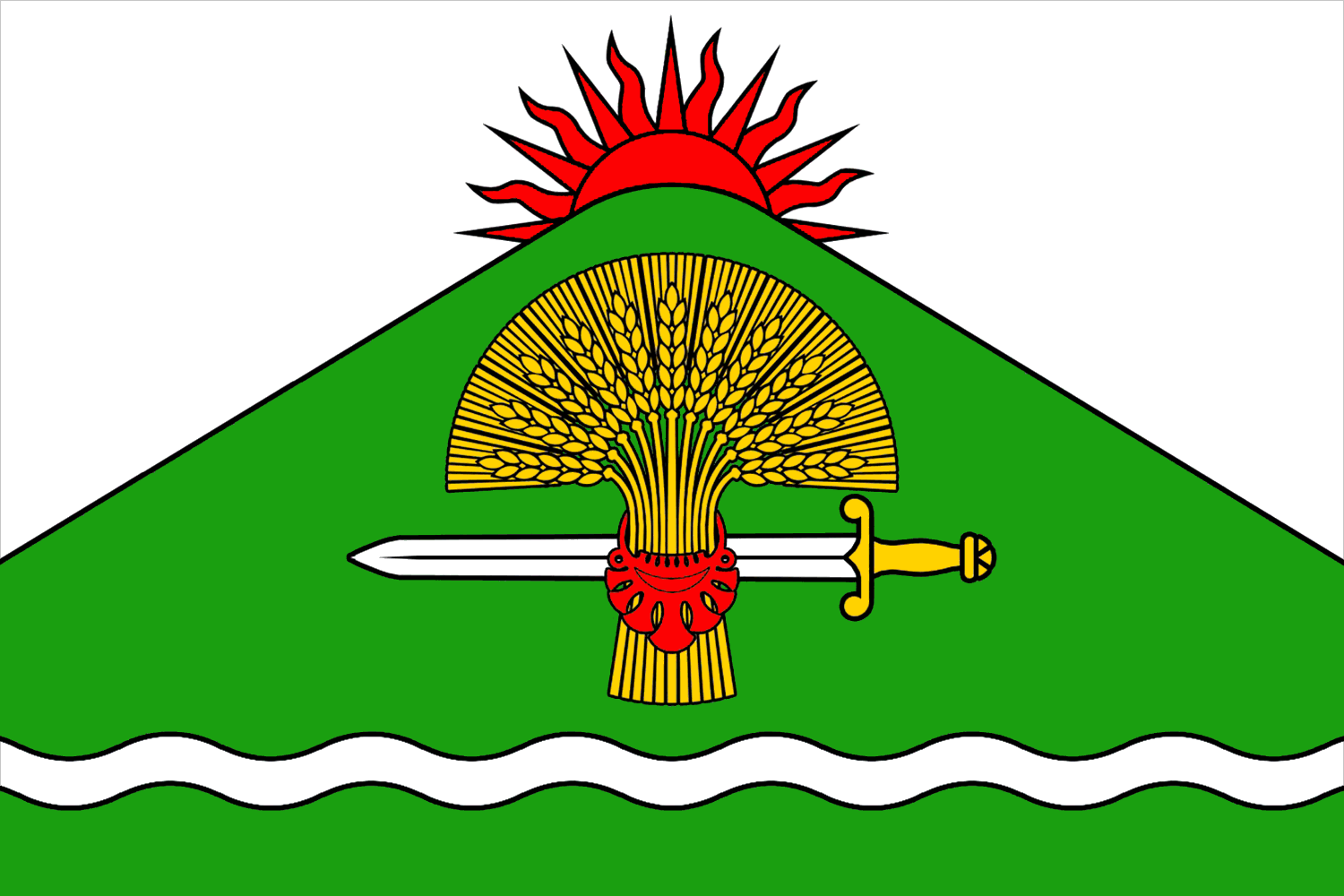
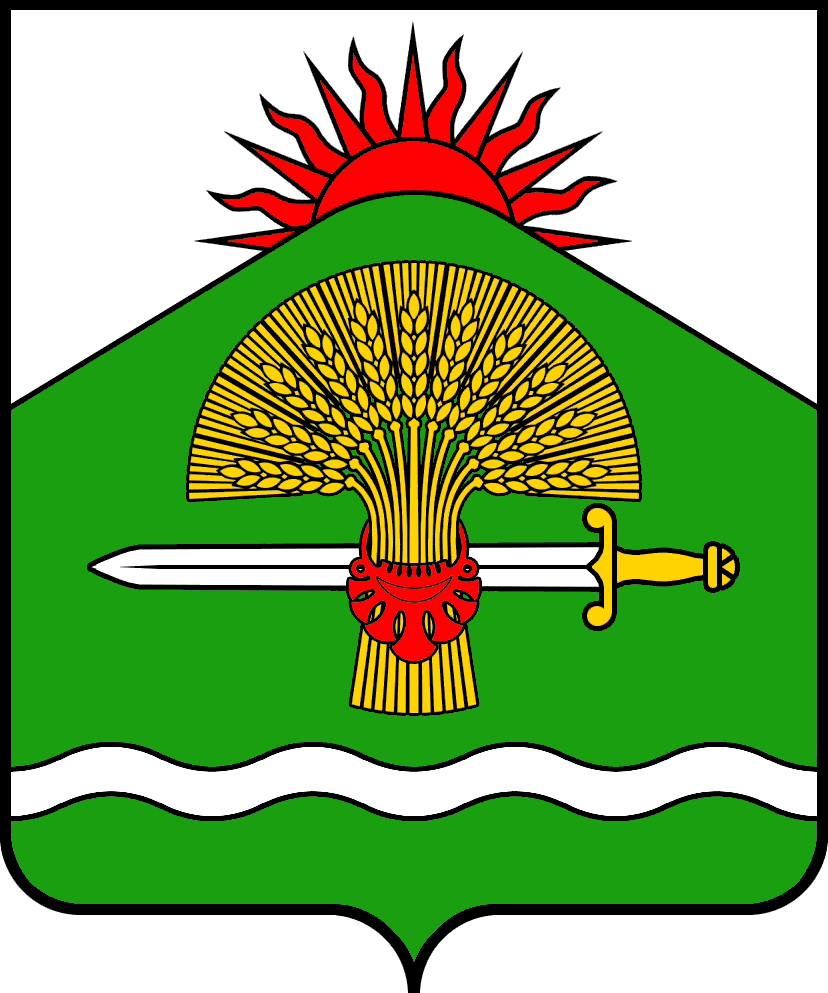
- Flag Coat of arms
- Location of Iznoskovsky District in Kaluga Oblast
- Coordinates: 54°59′20″N 35°19′00″E
- Country: Russia
- Federal subject: Kaluga Oblast
- Established: 1 October 1929
- Administrative center: Iznoski

Government
  - Type: Local government
  - Head of Administration: Vladimir Leonov

Area
  - Total: 1,333.8 km^{2} (515.0 sq mi)

Population (2010 Census)
  - Total: 7,011
  - Density: 5.256/km^{2} (13.61/sq mi)
  - Urban: 0%
  - Rural: 100%

Administrative structure
  - Inhabited localities: 122 rural localities

Municipal structure
  - Municipally incorporated as: Iznoskovsky Municipal District
  - Municipal divisions: 0 urban settlements, 10 rural settlements
- Time zone: UTC+3 (MSK)
- OKTMO ID: 29615000
- Website: http://iznoski-adm.ru/

Iznoskovsky District (Russian: Износковский райо́н) is an administrative and municipal district (raion), one of the twenty-four in Kaluga Oblast, Russia. It is located in the north of the oblast. The area of the district is 1,333.8 square kilometers (515.0 sq mi). Its administrative center is the rural locality (a selo) of Iznoski. Population: 6,422 (2021 census);7,011 (2010 census); 7,868 (2002 Census); 8,502 (1989 Soviet census). The population of Iznoski accounts for 26.8% of the district's population.
