= Meshchovsky District =

Meshchovsky District Мещовский район (Russian)
- District
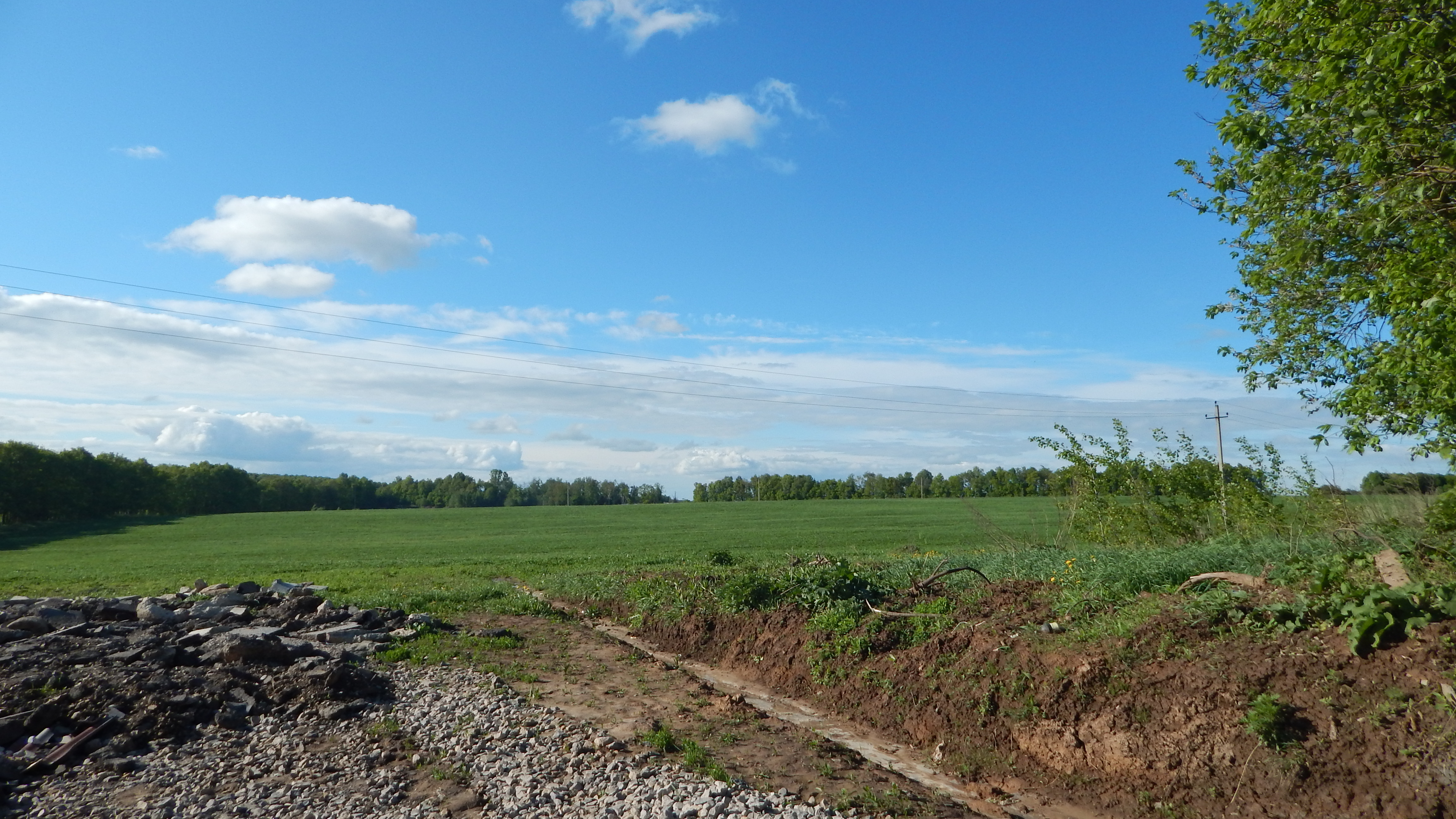
- Landscape in Meshchovsky District

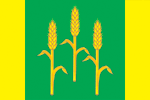
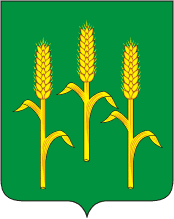
- Flag Coat of arms
- Location of Meshchovsky District in Kaluga Oblast
- Coordinates: 54°19′N 35°17′E
- Country: Russia
- Federal subject: Kaluga Oblast
- Established: 1 October 1929
- Administrative center: Meshchovsk

Area
  - Total: 1,237.54 km^{2} (477.82 sq mi)

Population (2010 Census)
  - Total: 12,161
  - Density: 9.8268/km^{2} (25.451/sq mi)
  - Urban: 33.7%
  - Rural: 66.3%

Administrative structure
  - Inhabited localities: 1 cities/towns, 168 rural localities

Municipal structure
  - Municipally incorporated as: Meshchovsky Municipal District
  - Municipal divisions: 1 urban settlements, 4 rural settlements
- Time zone: UTC+3 (MSK)
- OKTMO ID: 29627000
- Website: http://www.meshovsk.ru

Population of Meshchovsky District
- 2021 Census: 11,529
- 2010 Census: 12,161
- 2002 Census: 13,044
- 1989 Census: 15,244
- 1979 Census: 17,600

Meshchovsky District (Russian: Мещо́вский райо́н) is an administrative and municipal district (raion), one of the twenty-four in Kaluga Oblast, Russia. It is located in the center of the oblast. The area of the district is 1,237.54 square kilometers (477.82 sq mi). Its administrative center is the town of Meshchovsk. As of the 2021 Census, the total population of the district was 11,529, with the population of Meshchovsk accounting for 33.0% of that number.
