= Administrative divisions of Kaluga Oblast =

Kaluga Oblast Russia
- Administrative centre: Kaluga

Administrative structure (as of 2013)
- Districts: 24
- Cities/towns: 19
- Urban-type settlements: 10
- Selsovets, rural okrugs, and territorial okrugs: 77

Municipal structure (as of 2002)
- Rural settlements: 3,189 (inhabited); 270 (uninhabited)

Kaluga Oblast is a federal subject of Russia.

== Administrative and municipal divisions ==
- Cities and towns under the oblast's jurisdiction:
  - Kaluga (Калуга) (administrative center)
    - city okrugs:
      - Leninsky (Ленинский)
        - with 3 rural okrugs under the city okrug's jurisdiction.
      - Moskovsky (Московский)
        - with 3 rural okrugs under the city okrug's jurisdiction.
      - Oktyabrsky (Октябрьский)
        - with 2 rural okrugs under the city okrug's jurisdiction.
  - Kirov (Киров)
  - Lyudinovo (Людиново)
  - Obninsk (Обнинск)
- Districts:
  - Babyninsky (Бабынинский)
    - with 14 selsovets under the district's jurisdiction.
  - Baryatinsky (Барятинский)
    - with 14 selsovets under the district's jurisdiction.
  - Borovsky (Боровский)
    - Towns under the district's jurisdiction:
      - Balabanovo (Балабаново)
      - Borovsk (Боровск)
    - Urban-type settlements under the district's jurisdiction:
      - Yermolino (Ермолино)
    - with 9 selsovets under the district's jurisdiction.
  - Duminichsky (Думиничский)
    - Urban-type settlements under the district's jurisdiction:
      - Duminichi (Думиничи)
    - with 13 selsovets under the district's jurisdiction.
  - Dzerzhinsky (Дзержинский)
    - Towns under the district's jurisdiction:
      - Kondrovo (Кондрово)
    - Urban-type settlements under the district's jurisdiction:
      - Kurovskoy (Куровской)
      - Polotnyany Zavod (Полотняный Завод)
      - Pyatovsky (Пятовский)
      - Tovarkovo (Товарково)
    - with 19 selsovets under the district's jurisdiction.
  - Ferzikovsky (Ферзиковский)
    - Urban-type settlements under the district's jurisdiction:
      - Dugna (Дугна)
    - with 16 selsovets under the district's jurisdiction.
  - Iznoskovsky (Износковский)
    - with 10 selsovets under the district's jurisdiction.
  - Khvastovichsky (Хвастовичский)
    - with 17 selsovets under the district's jurisdiction.
  - Kirovsky (Кировский)
    - with 12 selsovets under the district's jurisdiction.
  - Kozelsky (Козельский)
    - Towns under the district's jurisdiction:
      - Kozelsk (Козельск)
      - Sosensky (Сосенский)
    - with 14 selsovets under the district's jurisdiction.
  - Kuybyshevsky (Куйбышевский)
    - with 12 selsovets under the district's jurisdiction.
  - Lyudinovsky (Людиновский)
    - with 10 selsovets under the district's jurisdiction.
  - Maloyaroslavetsky (Малоярославецкий)
    - Towns under the district's jurisdiction:
      - Maloyaroslavets (Малоярославец)
    - with 17 selsovets under the district's jurisdiction.
  - Medynsky (Медынский)
    - Towns under the district's jurisdiction:
      - Medyn (Медынь)
    - with 11 selsovets under the district's jurisdiction.
  - Meshchovsky (Мещовский)
    - Towns under the district's jurisdiction:
      - Meshchovsk (Мещовск)
    - with 17 selsovets under the district's jurisdiction.
  - Mosalsky (Мосальский)
    - Towns under the district's jurisdiction:
      - Mosalsk (Мосальск)
    - with 18 selsovets under the district's jurisdiction.
  - Peremyshlsky (Перемышльский)
    - with 16 selsovets under the district's jurisdiction.
  - Spas-Demensky (Спас-Деменский)
    - Towns under the district's jurisdiction:
      - Spas-Demensk (Спас-Деменск)
    - with 12 selsovets under the district's jurisdiction.
  - Sukhinichsky (Сухиничский)
    - Towns under the district's jurisdiction:
      - Sukhinichi (Сухиничи)
    - Urban-type settlements under the district's jurisdiction:
      - Seredeysky (Середейский)
    - with 17 selsovets under the district's jurisdiction.
  - Tarussky (Тарусский)
    - Towns under the district's jurisdiction:
      - Tarusa (Таруса)
    - with 10 selsovets under the district's jurisdiction.
  - Ulyanovsky (Ульяновский)
    - with 5 territorial okrugs under the district's jurisdiction.
  - Yukhnovsky (Юхновский)
    - Towns under the district's jurisdiction:
      - Yukhnov (Юхнов)
    - with 13 selsovets under the district's jurisdiction.
  - Zhizdrinsky (Жиздринский)
    - Towns under the district's jurisdiction:
      - Zhizdra (Жиздра)
    - with 11 selsovets under the district's jurisdiction.
  - Zhukovsky (Жуковский)
    - Towns under the district's jurisdiction:
      - Zhukov (Жуков)
    - Urban-type settlements under the district's jurisdiction:
      - Belousovo (Белоусово)
      - Kremyonki (Кременки)
    - with 12 selsovets under the district's jurisdiction.
