= Ihor Yakivyuk =

Ukrainian civil engineer, public figure, district council deputy (born 1968)

- Born: Yakivyuk Ihor Vasylovych Ukrainian: Яків'юк Ігор Васильович; November 20, 1968 (age 58); Kozelsk (in Ukrainian), Kozelsky District, Kaluga Oblast, Russian Soviet Federative Socialist Republic of the Soviet Union
- Citizenship: Ukraine
- Education: Kyiv Automobile and Road Institute (KADI), specialty civil engineer
- Occupations: General Director of LLC "INVESTMENT AND CONSTRUCTION COMPANY", civil engineer
- Years active: 1992 – present
- Title: Honored Builder of Ukraine (2018)
- Awards: Honored Builder of Ukraine (2018); Honorary Diploma of the Cabinet of Ministers of Ukraine (2017)

Ihor Yakivyuk (Ukrainian: Ігор Васильович Яків'юк; born November 20, 1968) is a Ukrainian civil engineer, public figure (Deputy Chairman of the public organization of the Association of Bukovynes in the city of Kyiv "Bukovina"), district council deputy and Honored Builder of Ukraine.

== Biography ==
Ihor Yakivyuk was born on November 20, 1968, in Kozelsk, Kozelsky District, Kaluga Oblast, Russian Soviet Federative Socialist Republic of the Soviet Union. Some sources state that Ihor Yakivyuk was born in Kaluga. His parents, Vasyl Yakivyuk and Oleksandra Yakivyuk, married in 1967.

In 1968, the Yakivyuk family, along with their son, moved to the father's native place—Roztoky, Putyla Raion, Chernivtsi Oblast. In 1985, I.Yakivyuk graduated from the Roztoky Secondary School and enrolled at the Kyiv Automobile and Road Institute. In 1987–1989 – served in the Armed Forces ( Border Troops) of the USSR. In 1992 – graduated from Kyiv Automobile and Road Institute, specialty civil engineer. In 1994–2004, he held executive positions in construction organizations in the city of Chernivtsi, and from 1997 — in Kyiv. In 2004, he founded the «Investment and Construction Company» LLC in Kyiv, which he has managed since its inception.

In 2010, I. Yakivyuk was elected as a deputy to the Boryspil District Council of the Kyiv Region. In 2017, I. Yakivyuk was awarded Honorary Diploma of the Cabinet of Ministers of Ukraine. In 2018, I. Yakivyuk was awarded the honorary title of "Honored Builder of Ukraine".

V. Klitschko presented a state award to I. Yakivyuk, 2018

I. Yakivyuk is deputy chairman of the public organization of the Association of Bukovynes in the city of Kyiv "Bukovina".

== State Awards ==
- Honorary Diploma of the Cabinet of Ministers of Ukraine (2017)
- Honored Builder of Ukraine (2018)
