= Kondrovo =

Kondrovo (Russian: Кондрово) is the name of several inhabited localities in Russia.

Urban localities

- Kondrovo, Kaluga Oblast, a town in Dzerzhinsky District of Kaluga Oblast

Rural localities

- Kondrovo, Tula Oblast, a village in Khitrovskaya Rural Administration of Uzlovsky District in Tula Oblast
