= Bavykino =

Bavykino (Russian: Бавыкино) is the name of several rural localities in Russia:

- Bavykino, Borovsky District, Kaluga Oblast, a village in Borovsky District of Kaluga Oblast
- Bavykino, Mosalsky District, Kaluga Oblast, a village in Mosalsky District of Kaluga Oblast
- Bavykino, Kursk Oblast, a village in Afanasyevsky Selsoviet of Oboyansky District of Kursk Oblast
- Bavykino, Chekhovsky District, Moscow Oblast, a village in Barantsevskoye Rural Settlement of Chekhovsky District of Moscow Oblast
- Bavykino, Naro-Fominsky District, Moscow Oblast, a village in Tashirovskoye Rural Settlement of Naro-Fominsky District of Moscow Oblast
- Bavykino, Zaraysky District, Moscow Oblast, a village in Gololobovskoye Rural Settlement of Zaraysky District of Moscow Oblast
- Bavykino, Tver Oblast, a village in Ostashkovskoye Rural Settlement of Torzhoksky District of Tver Oblast
