= Sosensky (inhabited locality) =

Sosensky (Russian: Сосенский; masculine), Sosenskaya (Сосенская; feminine), or Sosenskoye (Сосенское; neuter) is the name of several inhabited localities in Russia.

Urban localities

- Sosensky, Kaluga Oblast, a town in Kozelsky District of Kaluga Oblast

Rural localities

- Sosensky, Oryol Oblast, a settlement in Lukovsky Selsoviet of Maloarkhangelsky District in Oryol Oblast
