= Sosensky =

Sosensky (masculine), Sosenskaya (feminine), or Sosenskoye (neuter) may refer to:

- Sosensky Urban Settlement, a municipal formation which the town of Sosensky and three rural localities in Kozelsky District of Kaluga Oblast, Russia are incorporated as
- Sosenskoye Settlement, an administrative and municipal division of Novomoskovsky Administrative Okrug of the federal city of Moscow, Russia
- Sosensky (inhabited locality) (Sosenskaya, Sosenskoye), several inhabited localities in Russia
