= Yermolino, Kaluga Oblast =

Yermolino Ермолино
- Town
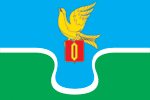
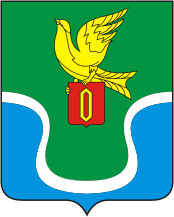
- Flag Coat of arms
- Interactive map of Yermolino
- Location of Yermolino Yermolino (Kaluga Oblast)
- Coordinates: 55°12′N 36°36′E
- Country: Russia
- Federal subject: Kaluga Oblast
- Administrative district: Borovsky District
- Founded: 16th century (Julian)
- Town status since: December 29, 2004
- Elevation: 141 m (463 ft)

Population (2010 Census)
  - Total: 10,409
  - Estimate (2023): 11,189 (+7.5%)

Municipal status
  - Municipal district: Borovsky Municipal District
  - Urban settlement: Yermolino Urban Settlement
  - Capital of: Yermolino Urban Settlement
- Time zone: UTC+3 (MSK)
- Postal codes: 249026, 249028
- OKTMO ID: 29606157001

Yermolino (Russian: Ермо́лино) is a town in Borovsky District of Kaluga Oblast, Russia. Population: 10,809 (2021 census); 10,409 (2010 census); 9,454 (2002 census); 10,573 (1989 Soviet census).

== History ==
Town status was granted to Yermolino on December 29, 2004.

== Administrative and municipal status ==
Within the framework of administrative divisions, Yermolino is subordinated to Borovsky District. As a municipal division, the town of Yermolino is incorporated within Borovsky Municipal District as Yermolino Urban Settlement.
