= Belousovo =

Belousovo (Russian: Белоусово) is the name of several inhabited localities in Russia.

== Modern localities ==
Urban localities

- Belousovo, Kaluga Oblast, a town in Zhukovsky District of Kaluga Oblast

Rural localities

- Belousovo, Arkhangelsk Oblast, a village in Chadromsky Selsoviet of Ustyansky District in Arkhangelsk Oblast
- Belousovo, Chelyabinsk Oblast, a selo in Belousovsky Selsoviet of Yetkulsky District in Chelyabinsk Oblast
- Belousovo, Irkutsk Oblast, a selo in Kachugsky District of Irkutsk Oblast
- Belousovo, Nolinsky District, Kirov Oblast, a village in Ludyansky Rural Okrug of Nolinsky District in Kirov Oblast; 57°38′N 49°46′E
- Belousovo, Yaransky District, Kirov Oblast, a village in Serdezhsky Rural Okrug of Yaransky District in Kirov Oblast; 57°13′N 48°21′E
- Belousovo, Moscow, a village in Novofedorovskoye Settlement of Troitsky Administrative Okrug in the federal city of Moscow
- Belousovo, Bor, Nizhny Novgorod Oblast, a village in Krasnoslobodsky Selsoviet under the administrative jurisdiction of the town of oblast significance of Bor in Nizhny Novgorod Oblast
- Belousovo, Sokolsky District, Nizhny Novgorod Oblast, a village in Mezhdurechensky Selsoviet of Sokolsky District in Nizhny Novgorod Oblast
- Belousovo, Voskresensky District, Nizhny Novgorod Oblast, a village in Glukhovsky Selsoviet of Voskresensky District in Nizhny Novgorod Oblast
- Belousovo, Opochetsky District, Pskov Oblast, a village in Opochetsky District of Pskov Oblast
- Belousovo, Pechorsky District, Pskov Oblast, a village in Pechorsky District of Pskov Oblast
- Belousovo, Kholm-Zhirkovsky District, Smolensk Oblast, a village in Nakhimovskoye Rural Settlement of Kholm-Zhirkovsky District in Smolensk Oblast
- Belousovo, Novoduginsky District, Smolensk Oblast, a village in Kapustinskoye Rural Settlement of Novoduginsky District in Smolensk Oblast
- Belousovo, Velizhsky District, Smolensk Oblast, a village in Seleznevskoye Rural Settlement of Velizhsky District in Smolensk Oblast
- Belousovo, Tomsk Oblast, a village in Tomsky District of Tomsk Oblast
- Belousovo, Tver Oblast, a village in Grishinskoye Rural Settlement of Oleninsky District in Tver Oblast
- Belousovo, Kirillovsky District, Vologda Oblast, a village in Sukhoverkhovsky Selsoviet of Kirillovsky District in Vologda Oblast
- Belousovo, Vytegorsky District, Vologda Oblast, a settlement in Ankhimovsky Selsoviet of Vytegorsky District in Vologda Oblast
- Belousovo, Yaroslavl Oblast, a village in Putchinsky Rural Okrug of Uglichsky District in Yaroslavl Oblast

== Alternative names ==
- Belousovo, alternative name of Belousov, a rural locality (a settlement) in Nizhnevsky Selsoviet of Starodubsky District in Bryansk Oblast, which was abolished in May 2010; 52°35′N 32°32′E
