= Pyatovsky =

Urban locality in Kaluga Oblast, Russia

Coordinates: 54°41′20″N 36°03′22″E

Pyatovsky (Russian: Пятовский) is an urban-type settlement in Dzerzhinsky District, Kaluga Oblast, Russia. Population: 2,649 (2021 census); 2,984 (2010 census); 3,019 (2002 census); 2,992 (1989 Soviet census).
