= Polotnyany Zavod =

Urban locality in Kaluga Oblast, Russia

Polotnyany Zavod Полотняный Завод
- City/town
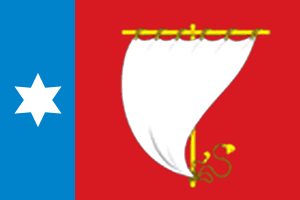
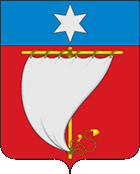
- Flag Coat of arms
- Interactive map of Polotnyany Zavod
- Location of Polotnyany Zavod Polotnyany Zavod (Kaluga Oblast)
- Coordinates: 54°43′42″N 35°58′23″E
- Country: Russia
- Federal subject: Kaluga Oblast
- Founded: 1718

Population (2010 Census)
  - Total: 5,224
  - Estimate (2025): 4,882 (−6.5%)
- Time zone: UTC+3 (MSK)
- Postal code: 249845
- OKTMO ID: 29608157051

Polotnyany Zavod (Russian: Полотняный Завод) is an urban-type settlement in Dzerzhinsky District, Kaluga Oblast, Russia. Population: 4,976 (2021 census); 5,224 (2010 census); 5,742 (2002 census); 5,441 (1989 Soviet census).
