= Yermolino Airport =

Yermolino Ермолино
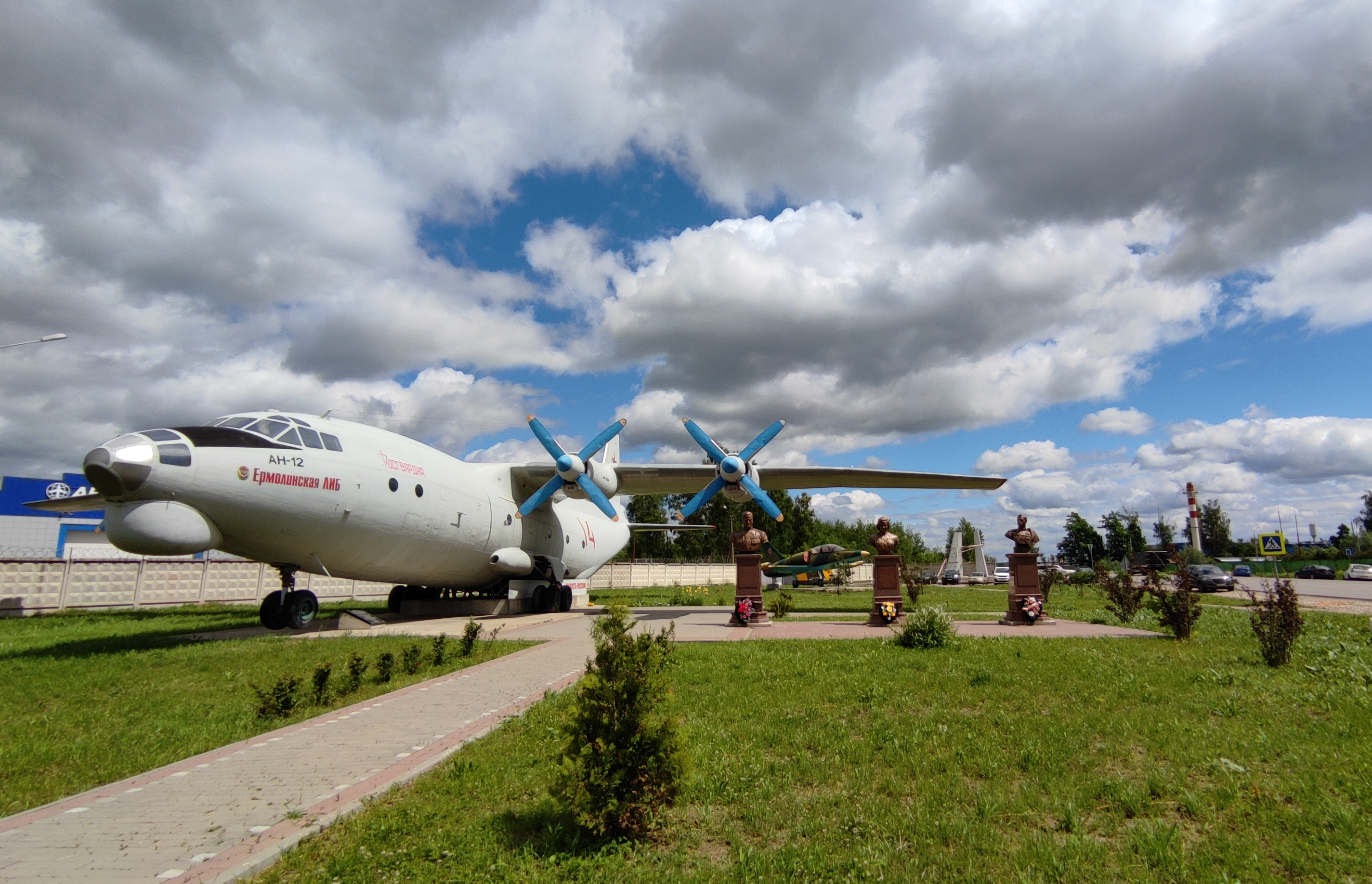
- Square with memorials in front of the Ermolino aerodrome check point
- IATA: none; ICAO: UUWE

Summary
- Airport type: military
- Operator: National Guard of Russia
- Location: Balabanovo, Russia
- Elevation AMSL: 640 ft / 195 m
- Coordinates: 55°13′42″N 36°36′30″E
- Interactive map of Yermolino

Runways
| Direction | Length | | Surface |
| Direction | ft | m | Surface |
|---|---|---|---|
| 31/13 | 9,842 | 3,000 | Concrete |

Yermolino (Russian: Ермолино) (former name Iniutino – Russian: Инютино) (ICAO: UUWE) is an aerodrome in Russia located 6 kilometers (3.7 mi) north-west of Balabanovo, Kaluga Oblast.

== History ==
It is a former military airfield and the 562nd Fighter Regiment base. Later aerodrome mainly serviced propeller-driven airplanes.

On 23 June 2014 an agreement between the UTair Aviation, the Ministry of the Interior of the Russian Federation and the Government of Kaluga Oblast was announced, which provided for establishing a civil airport on the airfield to serve as a new base for UTair Aviation. The existing infrastructure planned to be expanded in order to allocate up to 45 civil aircraft by 2017.

As of May 2019, these plans have not been implemented, the aerodrome retains its military status.

== See also ==
- List of airports in Russia
