= Balabanovo, Kaluga Oblast =

Town in Kaluga Oblast, Russia

Balabanovo Балабаново
- Town
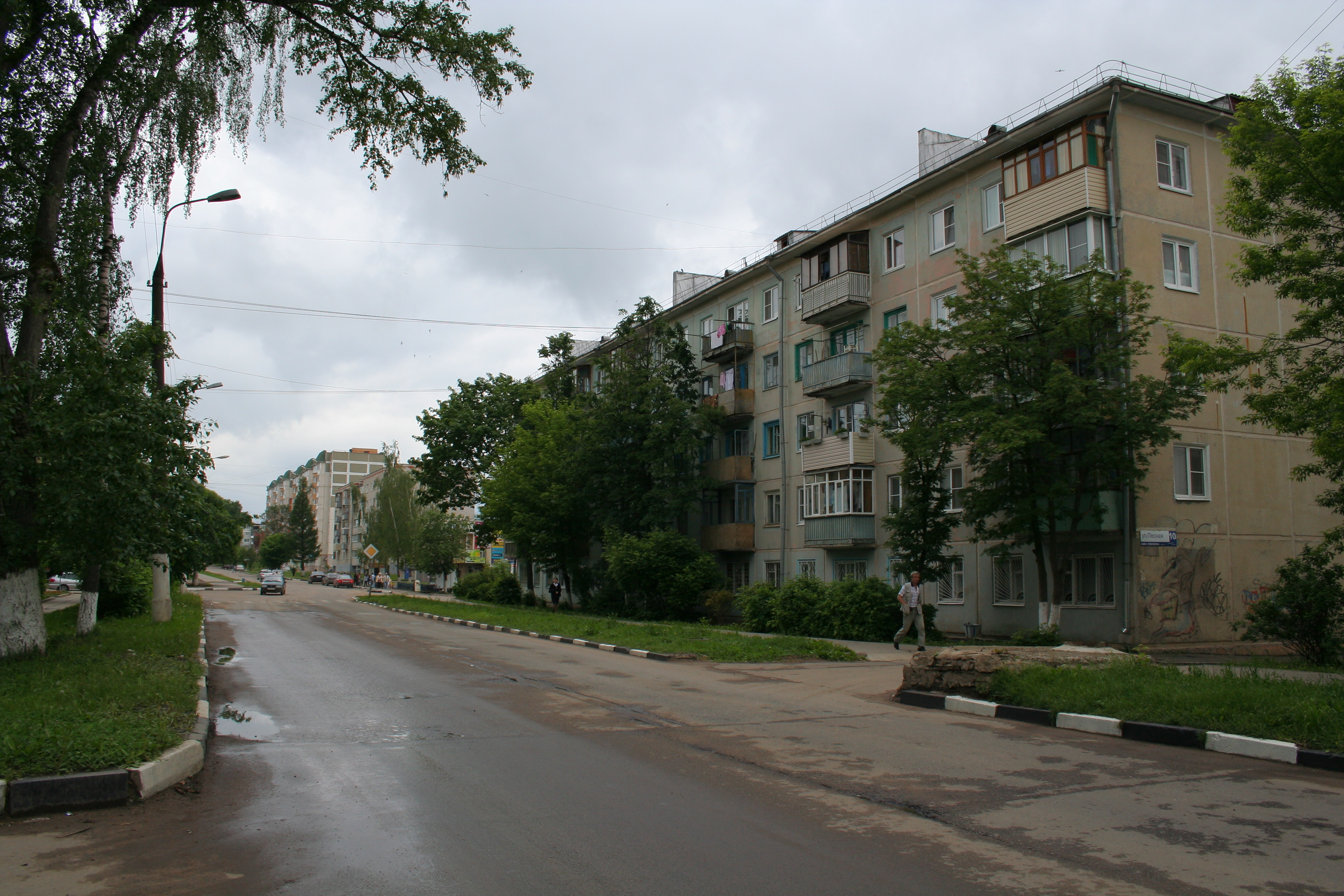
- Lesnaya Street in Balabanovo

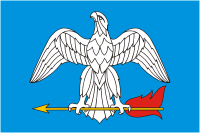
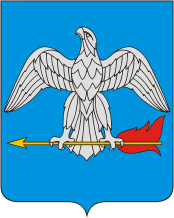
- Flag Coat of arms
- Interactive map of Balabanovo
- Location of Balabanovo Balabanovo (Kaluga Oblast)
- Coordinates: 55°11′N 36°40′E
- Country: Russia
- Federal subject: Kaluga Oblast
- Administrative district: Borovsky District
- First mentioned: early 17th century
- Town status since: 1972
- Elevation: 160 m (520 ft)

Population (2010 Census)
  - Total: 26,337
  - Estimate (2023): 30,194 (+14.6%)

Municipal status
  - Municipal district: Borovsky Municipal District
  - Urban settlement: Balabanovo Urban Settlement
  - Capital of: Balabanovo Urban Settlement
- Time zone: UTC+3 (MSK)
- Postal codes: 249000, 249001, 249004
- OKTMO ID: 29606105001
- Website: www.borovskr.ru/rayon/poseleniya/gorod-balabanovo/

Balabanovo (Russian: Балаба́ново) is a town in Borovsky District of Kaluga Oblast, Russia, located on the Protva River 76 kilometers (47 mi) northeast of Kaluga, the administrative center of the oblast. Population: 29,029 (2021 census); 26,337 (2010 census); 23,312 (2002 census); 19,139 (1989 Soviet census).

== History ==
It was first mentioned in the early 17th century as a village. It grew due to the construction of the Moscow–Bryansk railway in the early 20th century; Balabanovo railway station was opened in 1899. It was granted town status in 1972.

== Administrative and municipal status ==
Within the framework of administrative divisions, Balabanovo is subordinated to Borovsky District. As a municipal division, the town of Balabanovo is incorporated within Borovsky Municipal District as Balabanovo Urban Settlement.

== Transportation ==
The city has a railway station Balabanovo of the Kiev direction of the Moscow railway. Most trains, including express trains, stop at the station. The city has many intercity bus routes to Moscow, Obninsk, Borovsk, Ermolino and other cities. They all start from the main station square.

The town is served by the Yermolino Airport.
