= Belousovo, Kaluga Oblast =

Belousovo Белоусово
- Town
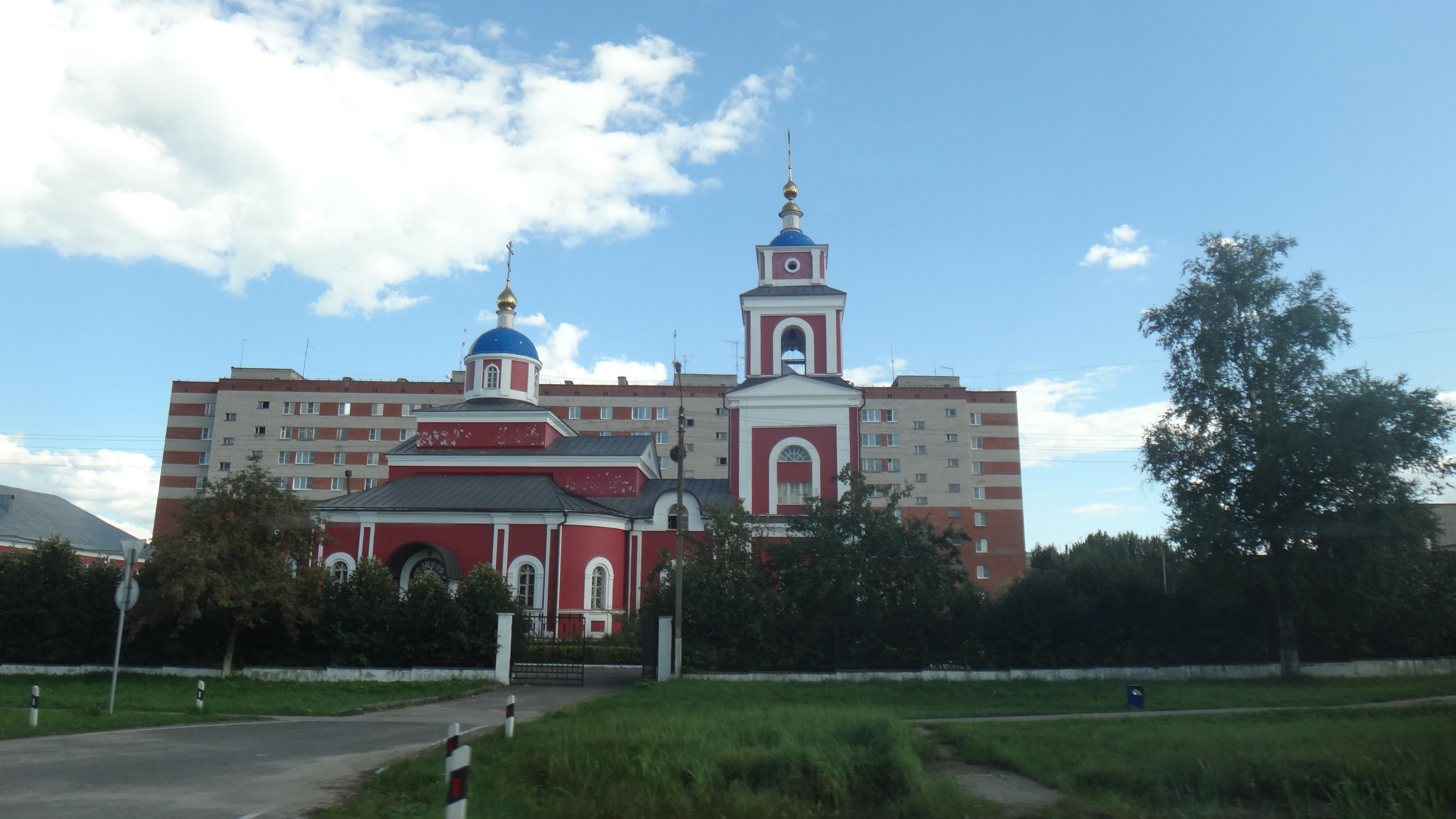
- Belousovo

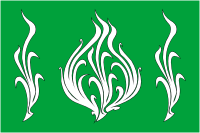
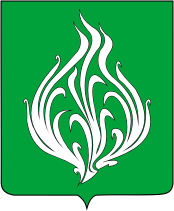
- Flag Coat of arms
- Interactive map of Belousovo
- Location of Belousovo Belousovo (Kaluga Oblast)
- Coordinates: 55°05′N 36°40′E
- Country: Russia
- Federal subject: Kaluga Oblast
- Administrative district: Zhukovsky District
- Town status since: December 29, 2004
- Elevation: 170 m (560 ft)

Population (2010 Census)
  - Total: 8,412
  - Estimate (2023): 10,980 (+30.5%)

Municipal status
  - Municipal district: Zhukovsky Municipal District
  - Urban settlement: Belousovo Urban Settlement
  - Capital of: Belousovo Urban Settlement
- Time zone: UTC+3 (MSK)
- Postal codes: 249160, 249161
- OKTMO ID: 29613157001
- Website: adm-zhukov.ru/poselenia/belousovo.html

Belousovo (Russian: Белоу́сово) is a town in Zhukovsky District of Kaluga Oblast, Russia. Population: 10,946 (2021 census); 8,412 (2010 census); 8,515 (2002 census); 11,886 (1989 Soviet census).

== History ==
Town status was granted to Belousovo on December 29, 2004.

== Administrative and municipal status ==
Within the framework of administrative divisions, Belousovo is subordinated to Zhukovsky District. As a municipal division, the town of Belousovo is incorporated within Zhukovsky Municipal District as Belousovo Urban Settlement.
