= Maloyaroslavetsky District =

Maloyaroslavetsky District Малоярославецкий район (Russian)
- District
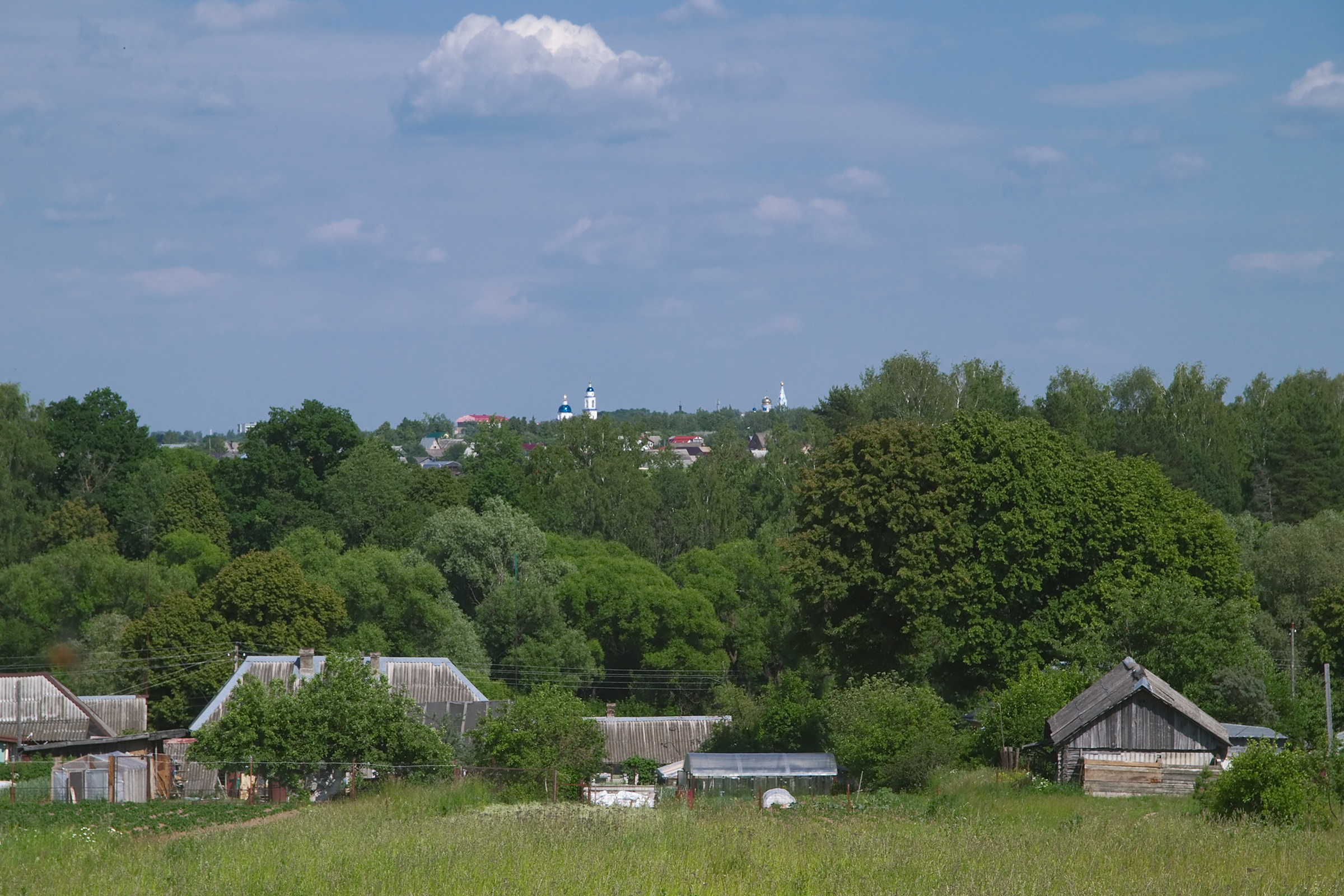
- Village Karizha, with Maloyaroslavets in the distance, Maloyaroslavetsky District

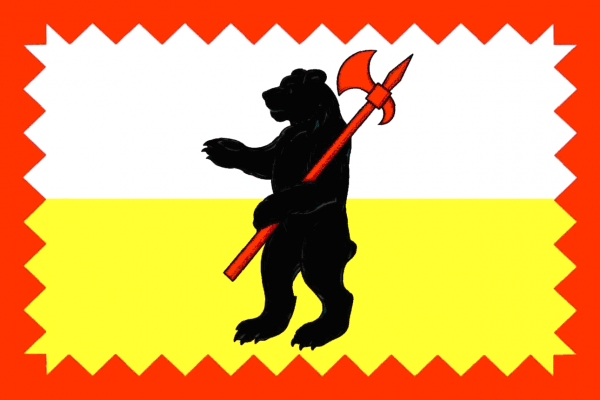
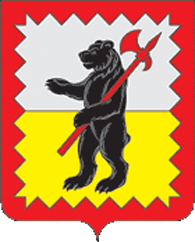
- Flag Coat of arms
- Location of Maloyaroslavetsky District in Kaluga Oblast
- Coordinates: 55°00′N 36°28′E
- Country: Russia
- Federal subject: Kaluga Oblast
- Established: 12 July 1929
- Administrative center: Maloyaroslavets

Area
  - Total: 1,547 km^{2} (597 sq mi)

Population (2010 Census)
  - Total: 54,269
  - Density: 35.08/km^{2} (90.86/sq mi)
  - Urban: 56.0%
  - Rural: 44.0%

Administrative structure
  - Inhabited localities: 1 cities/towns, 215 rural localities

Municipal structure
  - Municipally incorporated as: Maloyaroslavetsky Municipal District
  - Municipal divisions: 1 urban settlements, 17 rural settlements
- Time zone: UTC+3 (MSK)
- OKTMO ID: 29623000
- Website: http://www.amaloyar.admoblkaluga.ru

Maloyaroslavetsky District (Russian: Малоярославецкий райо́н) is an administrative and municipal district (raion), one of the twenty-four in Kaluga Oblast, Russia. It is located in the northeast of the oblast. The area of the district is 1,547 square kilometers (597 sq mi). Its administrative center is the town of Maloyaroslavets. Population: 68,702 (2021 census); 54,269 (2010 census); 55,910 (2002 census); 51,377 (1989 Soviet census). The population of Maloyaroslavets accounts for 60.9% of the district's total population.
