= Mykola Dmytrychenko =

Mykola Dmytrychenko (Ukrainian: Дмитриченко Микола Федорович; born December 19, 1952, Sniatyn) — rector of the National Transport University, head of the department of production, repair, and materials science, Doctor of Technical Sciences, Professor, Honored Worker of Science and Technology of Ukraine, Laureate of the State Prize of Ukraine in the field of science and technology, full member of the Academy of Pedagogical Sciences of Ukraine (2016), President of the National Transport University of Ukraine.

== Biography ==
He was born on December 19, 1952, in Sniatyn, Ivano-Frankivsk region, in a family of teachers. In 1976, he graduated with honors from the mechanical faculty of the Kyiv Institute of Civil Aviation Engineers, where he went from being a postgraduate student, assistant to professor, head of the department, vice-rector of the university.

From 2000 to 2002, he held the position of head of the higher education department of the Ministry of Education and Science of Ukraine. He was part of a team of specialists developing the draft law of Ukraine "On Higher Education", the Concept of the development of distance education in Ukraine, and other legislative and regulatory acts in the field of higher education. Since 2003 — rector of the National Transport University and head of the department of production, repair, and materials science.

He is an expert in the field of machinery. Dmytrychenko is an author and co-author of over 250 scientific works, including the monograph "Elastohydrodynamics: Theory and Practice", study guides: "Higher Education and the Bologna Process", "Tribology and the Basics of Machine Reliability". He developed a series of new methods for improving wear resistance and reliability of machines.

He underwent training in higher educational institutions of the UK, USA, and Canada. He is fluent in English.

He is married and has two children - a son and a daughter.

In the morning of October 14, 2022, the Pechersk police department of the National Police in Kyiv began the persecution of civil activists who participated in the dismantling of the monument to Pushkin. The motive for this was a complaint to the police, which was filed by Mykola Dmytrychenko, the rector of the National Transport University. That is, the capital's university openly defended the Russian identity and Alexander Pushkin.
