= Tovarkovo, Kaluga Oblast =

Urban locality in Kaluga Oblast, Russia

Coordinates: 54°40′48″N 35°56′15″E

Tovarkovo Товарково
- Interactive map of Tovarkovo
- Country: Russia
- Oblast: Kaluga Oblast
- District: Dzerzhinsky District

Tovarkovo (Russian: Товарково) is an urban-type settlement in Dzerzhinsky District, Kaluga Oblast, Russia. Population: 14,496 (2010 census); 14,454 (2002 census); 12,736 (1989 Soviet census).
