= Honorary titles of Ukraine =

Meritorious awards of Ukraine

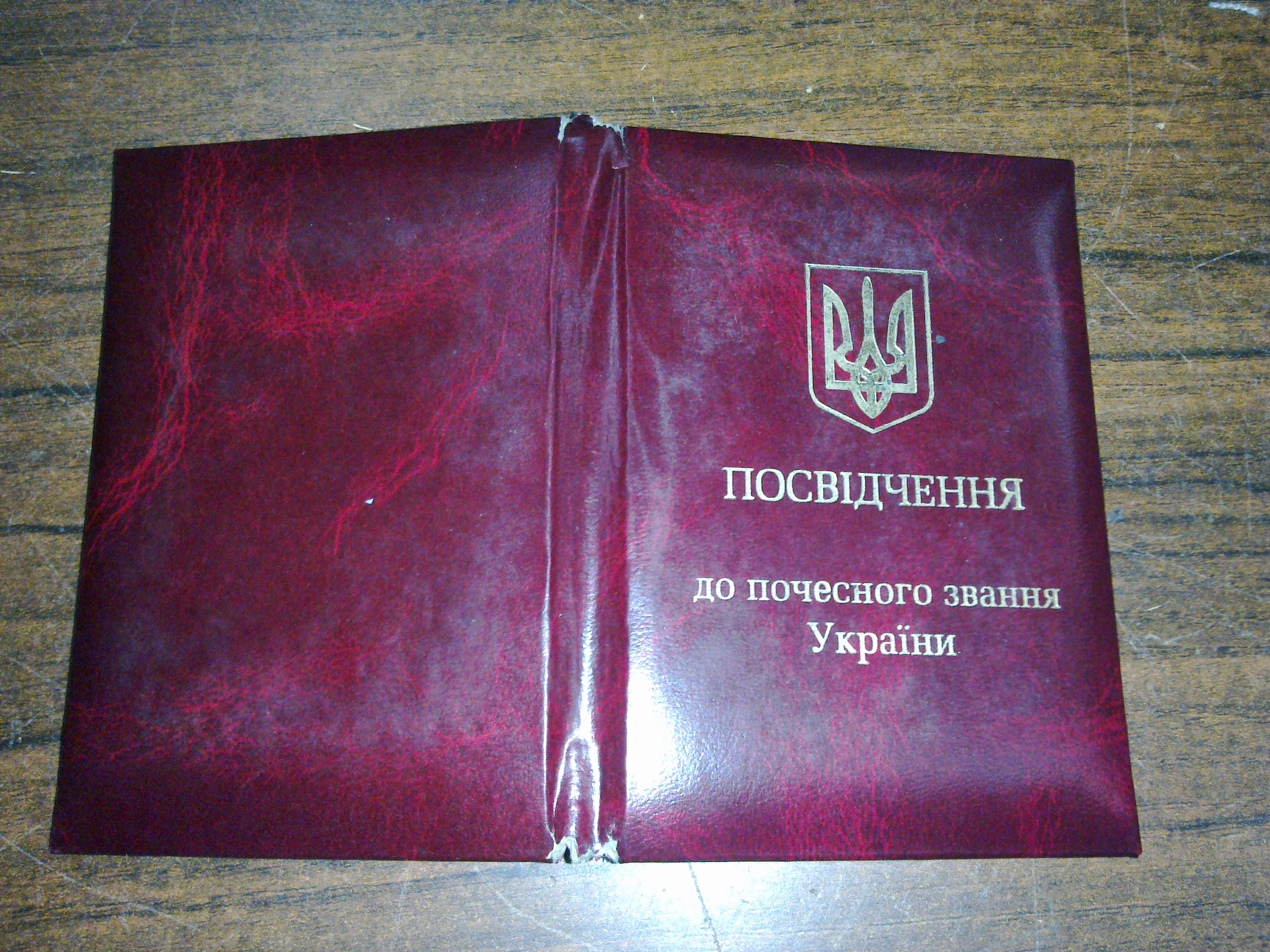
“Certificate of Honoured Artist of Ukraine”

Honorary titles of Ukraine (Ukrainian: Почесні звання України) are meritorious awards of Ukraine. Most of them are state awards and practically all were transformed from the same titles of the Ukrainian SSR.

== Types ==
There are several degrees for honorary titles which are also designated for various carrier (industry) fields.

The top honorary title of Ukraine is the Hero of Ukraine that is accompanied by either Order of the Gold Star for military recognition and Order of the State for civilian recognition.

The more common honorary titles are People's or Merited with People's titles being considered of slightly higher tier over Merited. These titles are accompanied by a respective identification badge, gilded silver - for People's titles and silver - for Merited titles. Along with them there are some top sport titles that are also considered Merited, but are regulated differently.

Aside the above-mentioned titles there are number of other titles such as the Mother-Heroine which particularly is an equally respected along with honorary titles. The accompanied badge for the Mother-Heroine title is made of brass. Another honorary title is the President of Ukraine that stays with its holder for the rest of one's life. Honorary titles are also created in number of companies and organizations as well as city administrations among which are honorary presidents, honorary citizens and others.

Since the 2022 Russian full scale invasion of Ukraine, there was introduced the Soviet-type award granted to cities, defenders of which distinguished themselves in fight against military aggression. Previously in the Soviet Union a similar award was granted to cities in the aftermath of World War II.

=== Hero titles ===
- Hero of Ukraine, successor of the Hero of the Soviet Union and the Hero of Socialist Labor
- Mother-Heroine, successor of the Mother-Heroine of the Soviet Union
- Hero City of Ukraine, successor of the Hero City (Soviet Union)

=== People's titles ===
- People's Artist of Ukraine
- People's Architect of Ukraine
- People's Teacher of Ukraine
- People's Painter of Ukraine

=== Merited titles ===
These titles have also been translated as "Honored" rather than "Merited". However, since Order of Merit is awarded for highest merits (Ukrainian: заслуги, zasluhy), honorary titles are translated as Merited (Ukrainian: заслужений, zasluzhenyi).

- Honored Artist of Ukraine
- Honored Architect of Ukraine
- Honored Builder of Ukraine
- Honored Inventor of Ukraine
- Honored Teacher of Ukraine
- Honored Mining Engineer of Ukraine
- Honored Arts Functionary of Ukraine
- Honored Science and Technology Functionary of Ukraine
- Honored Donor of Ukraine
- Honored Economist of Ukraine
- Honored Power Engineer of Ukraine
- Honored Journalist of Ukraine
- Honored doctor of Ukraine
- Honored Forester of Ukraine
- Honored Master of Folk Arts of Ukraine
- Honored Machine Builder of Ukraine
- Honored Metallurgist of Ukraine
- Honored Metrologist of Ukraine
- Honored Worker of Veterinary Medicine of Ukraine
- Honored Culture Worker of Ukraine
- Honored Education Worker of Ukraine
- Honored Healthcare Worker of Ukraine
- Honored Industry Worker of Ukraine
- Honored Transportation Worker of Ukraine
- Honored Tourism Worker of Ukraine
- Honored Agriculture Worker of Ukraine
- Honored Social Worker of Ukraine
- Honored Service Sector Worker of Ukraine
- Honored Pharmacy Worker of Ukraine
- Honored Worker of Physical Culture and Sports of Ukraine
- Honored Civil Defense Worker of Ukraine
- Honored Environmentalist of Ukraine
- Honored Rationalizer of Ukraine
- Honored Painter of Ukraine
- Honored Miner of Ukraine
- Honored Lawyer of Ukraine

=== Sports titles ===
- Merited Coach of Ukraine
- Merited Master of Sports of Ukraine
- Master of Sports of Ukraine, World Class (type of sports) / Grandmaster of Ukraine
- Master of Sports of Ukraine (type of sports)

=== Other titles ===
- Guard, elite military formations and Naval ships
- Academic, to theaters of drama or music
- National (National Opera of Ukraine, Olimpiysky National Sports Complex, National Space Agency of Ukraine, National Academy of Sciences of Ukraine, others)

=== Discontinued titles ===
There are many titles that were discontinued among which are the Exemplary titles, Distinguished titles (Distinguished Corn Producer of Ukraine, Distinguished Agricultural Machine Operator of Ukraine and others).

- Honorary Firefighter-Volunteer of Ukraine
