= Mosalsky District =

Mosalsky District Мосальский район (Russian)
- District
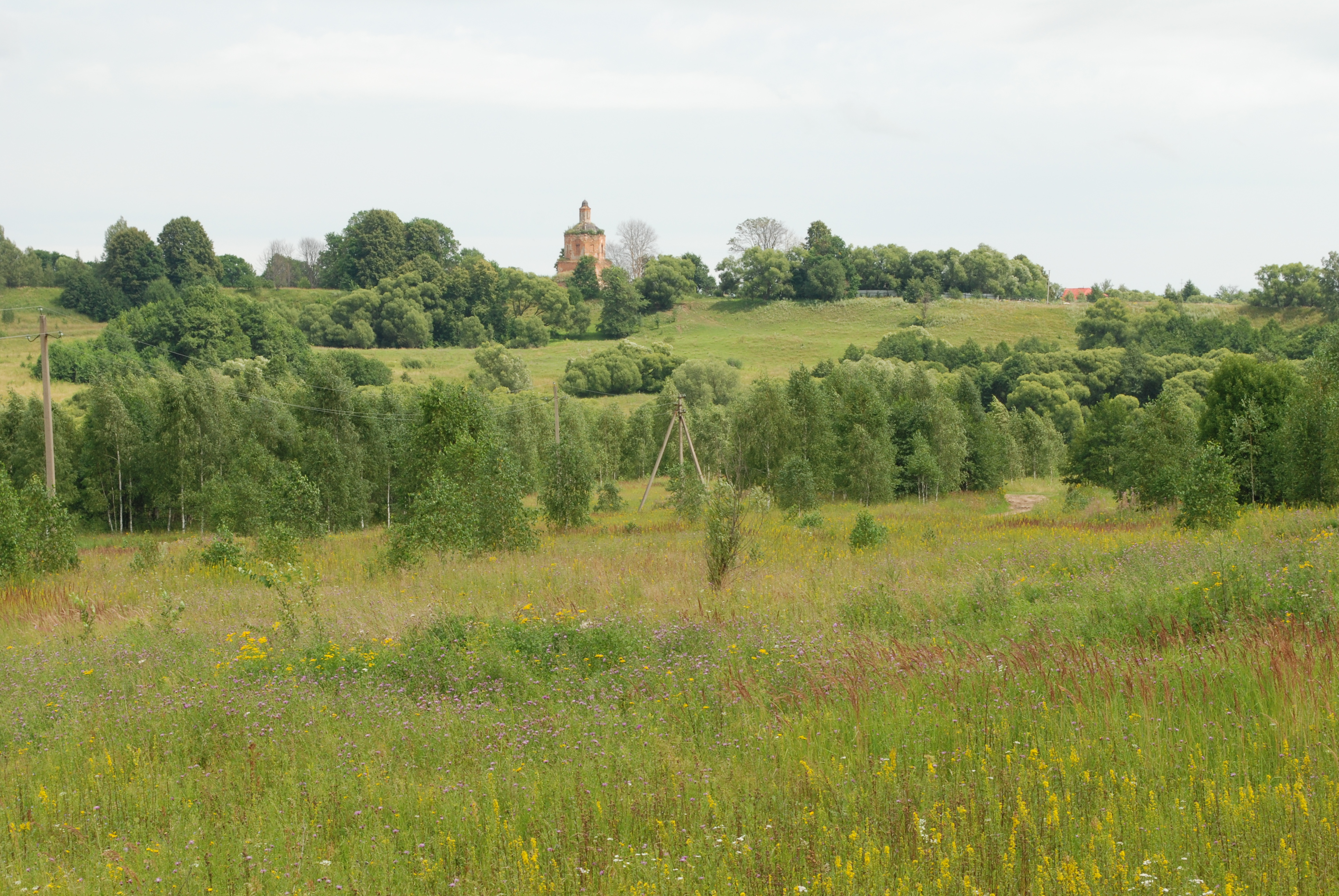
- Church of the Epiphany in the village of Lensk, Mosalsky District

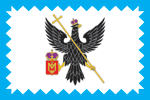
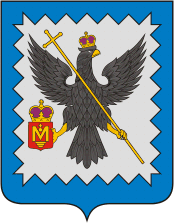
- Flag Coat of arms
- Location of Mosalsky District in Kaluga Oblast
- Coordinates: 54°29′N 34°59′E
- Country: Russia
- Federal subject: Kaluga Oblast
- Established: 1 October 1929
- Administrative center: Mosalsk

Area
  - Total: 1,320 km^{2} (510 sq mi)

Population (2010 Census)
  - Total: 9,094
  - Density: 6.89/km^{2} (17.8/sq mi)
  - Urban: 47.2%
  - Rural: 52.8%

Administrative structure
  - Inhabited localities: 1 cities/towns, 173 rural localities

Municipal structure
  - Municipally incorporated as: Mosalsky Municipal District
  - Municipal divisions: 1 urban settlements, 10 rural settlements
- Time zone: UTC+3 (MSK)
- OKTMO ID: 29629000
- Website: http://mosalsk-adm.ru/

Mosalsky District (Russian: Мосальский райо́н) is an administrative and municipal district (raion), one of the twenty-four in Kaluga Oblast, Russia. It is located in the west of the oblast. The area of the district is 1,320 square kilometers (510 sq mi). Its administrative center is the town of Mosalsk. Population: 9,131 (2021 census); 9,094 (2010 census); 10,357 (2002 Census); 11,537 (1989 Soviet census). The population of Mosalsk accounts for 46.4% of the district's total population.
