= Sosensky, Kaluga Oblast =

Sosensky Сосенский
- Town
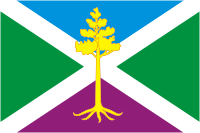
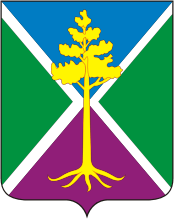
- Flag Coat of arms
- Interactive map of Sosensky
- Location of Sosensky Sosensky (Kaluga Oblast)
- Coordinates: 54°03′N 35°58′E
- Country: Russia
- Federal subject: Kaluga Oblast
- Administrative district: Kozelsky District
- Founded: April 1952
- Town status since: 1991

Population (2010 Census)
  - Total: 12,392
  - Estimate (2023): 11,259 (−9.1%)

Municipal status
  - Municipal district: Kozelsky Municipal District
  - Urban settlement: Sosensky Urban Settlement
  - Capital of: Sosensky Urban Settlement
- Time zone: UTC+3 (MSK)
- Postal codes: 249710, 249711
- OKTMO ID: 29616104001
- Website: sosensky-adm.ru

Sosensky (Russian: Сосенский) is a town in Kozelsky District of Kaluga Oblast, Russia, located in the southeast of the oblast, 90 kilometers (56 mi) southwest of Kaluga, the administrative center of the oblast, and 10 kilometers (6.2 mi) from Kozelsk, the administrative center of the district. Population: 11,413 (2021 census); 12,392 (2010 census); 12,623 (2002 census); 13,275 (1989 Soviet census).

== History ==
It was founded in April 1952 as the coal-mining settlement of Tsentralny Kozelskogo stroyupravleniya (Центра́льный Козе́льского стройуправле́ния). On January 27, 1954, it was granted urban-type settlement status and renamed Leninsky (Ле́нинский); however, for an unknown reason it was renamed Shepelevsky (Шепелевский) on April 5, 1954, and finally Sosensky on April 10, 1954. It was granted town status in 1991.

== Administrative and municipal status ==
Within the framework of administrative divisions, Sosensky is subordinated to Kozelsky District. As a municipal division, the town of Sosensky, together with three rural localities in Kozelsky District, is incorporated within Kozelsky Municipal District as Sosensky Urban Settlement.
