= National Transport University =

Educational institution in Kyiv, Ukraine

Coordinates: 50.4400°N 30.5499°E

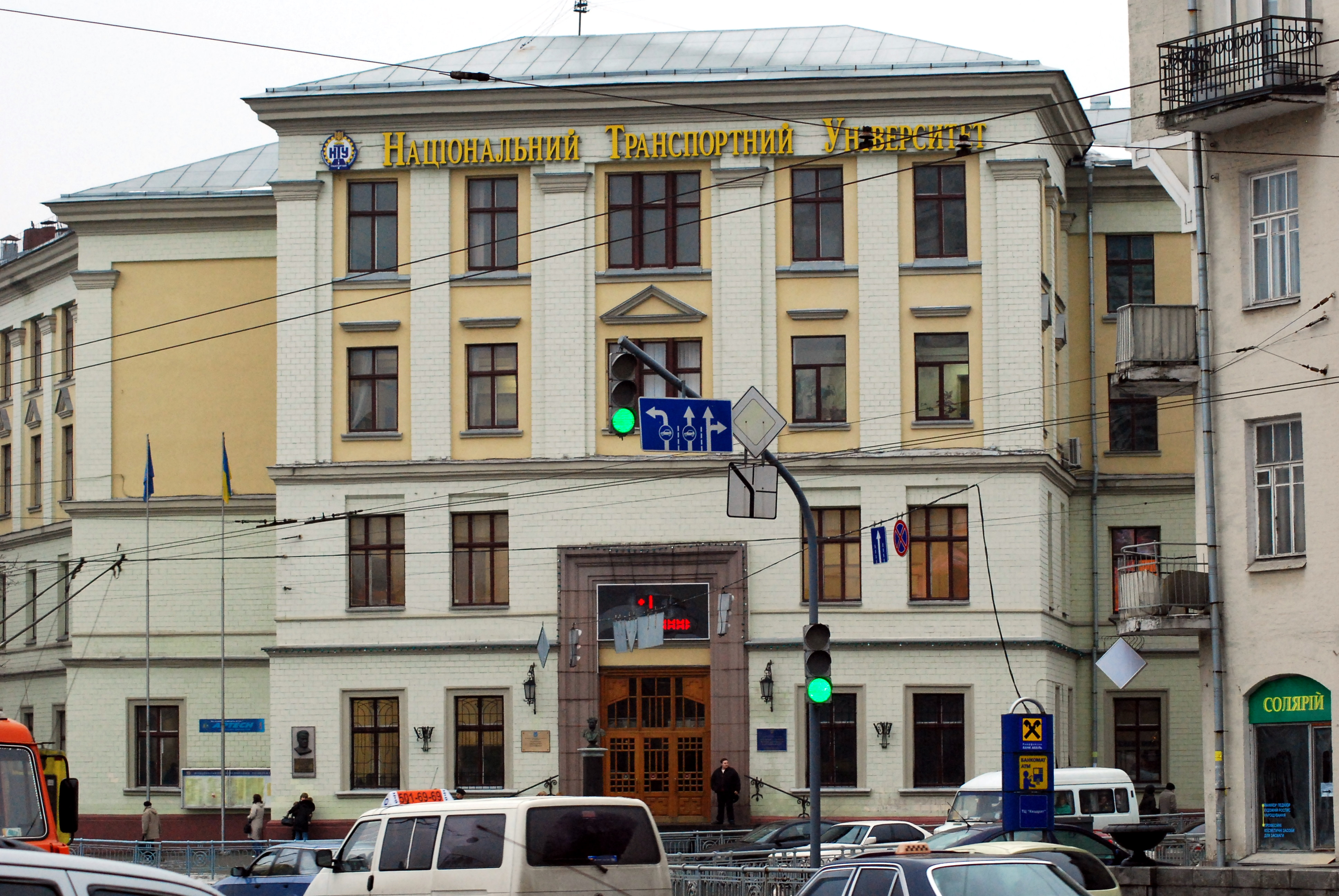
- Established: 1944
- Location: Kyiv, Ukraine
- Affiliations: Ministry of Education and Science of Ukraine
- Website: www.ntu.edu.ua

The National Transport University (abbr. NTU) is a higher education institution with an IV level of accreditation in Kyiv, Ukraine. The main building is located in the capital and major reconstructed building of the former Kyiv-Pechersk Gymnasium.

== History ==
In 1944, the Order of the Council of People's Commissars of the USSR No. 11.06 of November 7, 1944, established the Kyiv Automobile and Road Institute (KADI), the future National Transport University (NTU). Two faculties were created, road and mechanical, for the training of specialists in four specialties: highways, bridges, automobiles, and the automobile industry, road machines, and mechanisms. Yuriy Mykolayovych Dadenkov has been appointed as the director of KADI.

In 1945, 247 students and 49 professors, associate professors, and teachers worked at KADI. In the post-war period, the first director of the newly created institute, Y. M. Dadenkov (later a corresponding member of the Academy of Sciences of Ukraine, for many years, the Minister of Higher Education of Ukraine) managed to attract many scientists to his teaching work.

1958: The mechanical faculty of KADI was renamed the automotive faculty.

1959: Evgeny Petrovych Verizhenk was appointed rector of KADI.

1964: A research sector was created at KADI (subsequently called the scientific part).

In August 1994, after state accreditation, KADI received the status of a technical university, the highest level of IV accreditation, and the name Ukrainian Transport University (UTU).

1998: The Faculty of Pre-University Training was created based on the preparatory department and preparatory courses.

1999: The Institute of Economics and Business was established based on UTU's Faculty of Postgraduate Education.

2000: UTU receives national status, and its current name is National Transport University (NTU).

2003: Professor Mykola Dmytrychenko, elected by the conference of the university's labor team, was appointed rector of NTU.

2003: The university was again recognized as accredited with the status of a higher education institution at the IV level.

2004: NTU's Faculty of Pre-University Training was reorganized into the Institute of Pre-University Training and International Cooperation of NTU.

In May 2004, the research laboratory "Technology of Materials and Constructions of Transport Construction", named after Professor H. K. Xunya, was established at the Department of Road Construction Materials and Chemistry.

The main activities of the laboratory are aimed at the development and introduction of new durable materials for highways, bridges, and airfields.

2004: Entry into the National Transport University of the Nadvirnya College of the 1st level of accreditation and the Bar Automobile and Road Technical School of the 1st level of accreditation

2005: Five leading scientists from the university became laureates of the State Prize of Ukraine in the field of science and technology.

2005: The university was approved by the TEMPUS TASIS project coordinator. Now the university participates in 20 international agreements on cooperation. 29 foreign universities are involved in the implementation of the projects.

2005: The university was awarded the "Leader of the Transport Complex of Ukraine" diploma.

== See also ==
List of universities in Ukraine
