= Mosalsk =

Mosalsk Мосальск
- Town
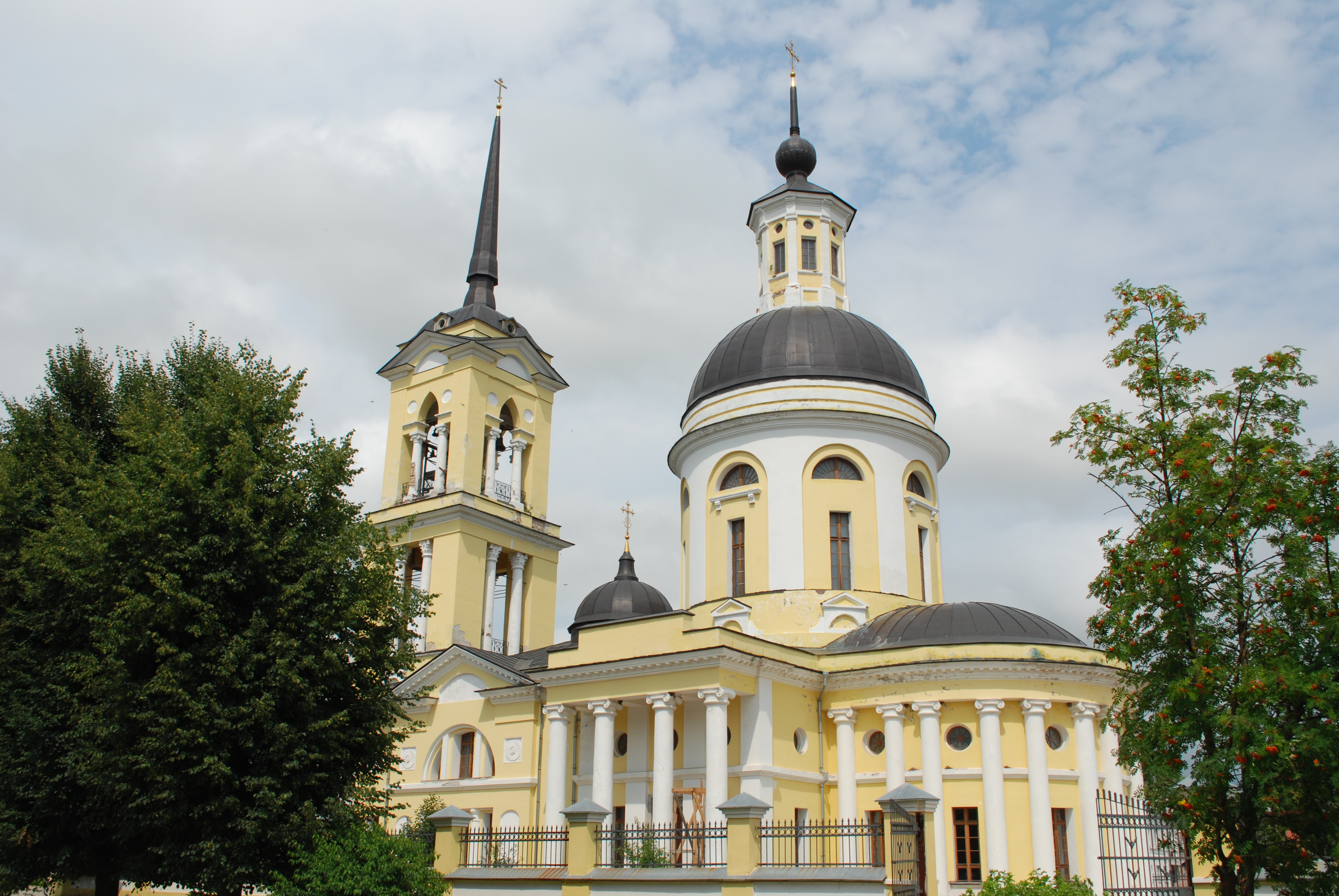
- St. Nicholas Cathedral

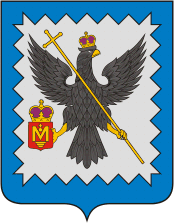
- Coat of arms
- Interactive map of Mosalsk
- Location of Mosalsk Mosalsk (Kaluga Oblast)
- Coordinates: 54°30′N 34°59′E
- Country: Russia
- Federal subject: Kaluga Oblast
- Administrative district: Mosalsky District
- First mentioned: 1231
- Town status since: 1776

Area
  - Total: 7.93 km^{2} (3.06 sq mi)
- Elevation: 210 m (690 ft)

Population (2010 Census)
  - Total: 4,288
  - Estimate (2023): 4,251 (−0.9%)
  - Density: 541/km^{2} (1,400/sq mi)

Administrative status
  - Capital of: Mosalsky District

Municipal status
  - Municipal district: Mosalsky Municipal District
  - Urban settlement: Mosalsk Urban Settlement
  - Capital of: Mosalsky Municipal District, Mosalsk Urban Settlement
- Time zone: UTC+3 (MSK)
- Postal code: 249930
- Dialing code: +7 48452
- OKTMO ID: 29629101001

Mosalsk (Russian: Моса́льск) is a town and the administrative center of Mosalsky District in Kaluga Oblast, Russia, located 82 kilometers (51 mi) west of Kaluga, the administrative center of the oblast. Population: 4,234 (2021 census); 4,288 (2010 census); 4,380 (2002 census); 4,610 (1989 Soviet census).

== History ==
Historical affiliations

Grand Duchy of Lithuania 1407–1493
Grand Duchy of Moscow 1493–1547
Tsardom of Russia 1547–1721
Russian Empire 1721–1917
Russian Republic 1917
Soviet Russia 1917–1922
Soviet Union 1922–1991
Russian Federation 1991–present

First attested in 1231 as Masalsk (Масальск), it became the center of one of the Upper Oka Principalities in the 14th century. After Ivan III annexed the principality to the Grand Duchy of Moscow in 1493, local princes emigrated either to the Grand Duchy of Lithuania (where they became known as Princes Massalski) or to Moscow (where they were known as Princes Koltsov-Mosalsky). Mosalsk was granted town status within Kaluga Governorate in 1776.

== Administrative and municipal status ==
Within the framework of administrative divisions, Mosalsk serves as the administrative center of Mosalsky District, to which it is directly subordinated. As a municipal division, the town of Mosalsk is incorporated within Mosalsky Municipal District as Mosalsk Urban Settlement.

== Architecture ==
The town's main landmark is St. Nicholas Cathedral (1818).

== Notable people ==
The town was the birthplace of Professor Alexander Ivanovich Chuprov.
