= Honored Builder of Ukraine =

Ukrainian distinction

Merited Builder of Ukraine Заслужений будівельник України
- Merited Builder of Ukraine badge

Awarded by President of Ukraine
- Type: Order of merit
- Country: Ukraine
- Eligibility: A person with ten years of experience in the construction sector and higher or vocational-technical education
- Criteria: For significant achievements in fulfilling production targets, increasing labor productivity, improving quality, reducing the production costs of construction materials, and implementing modern, advanced construction methods and technologies in the construction sector
- Status: Currently constituted

The Honored Builder of Ukraine (also translated as The Merited Builder of Ukraine, Ukrainian: Заслужений будівельник України, romanized: Zasluzhenyi Budivelnyk Ukrainy) is a state award of Ukraine. The award is an honorary title bestowed by Ukraine (before 1991 by the Ukrainian SSR) for a significant contribution to the country's construction sector.

The title is awarded by decrees of the President of Ukraine, in accordance with the Law of Ukraine "On State Awards of Ukraine" and accompanied by a 35 mm × 45 mm (1.4 in × 1.8 in) silver badge.

== History ==
The award was established as a state honor of the Ukrainian SSR on 4 August 1958, as the Honored Builder of the Ukrainian SSR. In 2001, according to the Decree of the President of Ukraine No. 461, it was replaced by the awards current title.

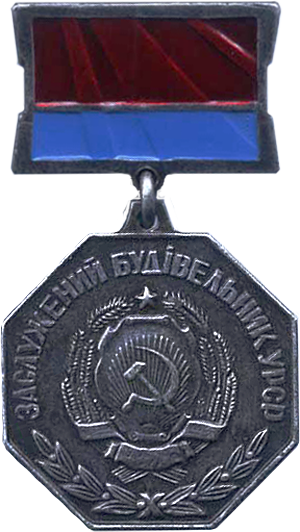
Front side of preceding award

== See also ==
- Honored Journalist of Ukraine
- Honorary titles of Ukraine
