= Kondrovo, Kaluga Oblast =

Town in Kaluga Oblast, Russia

Kondrovo Кондрово
- Town
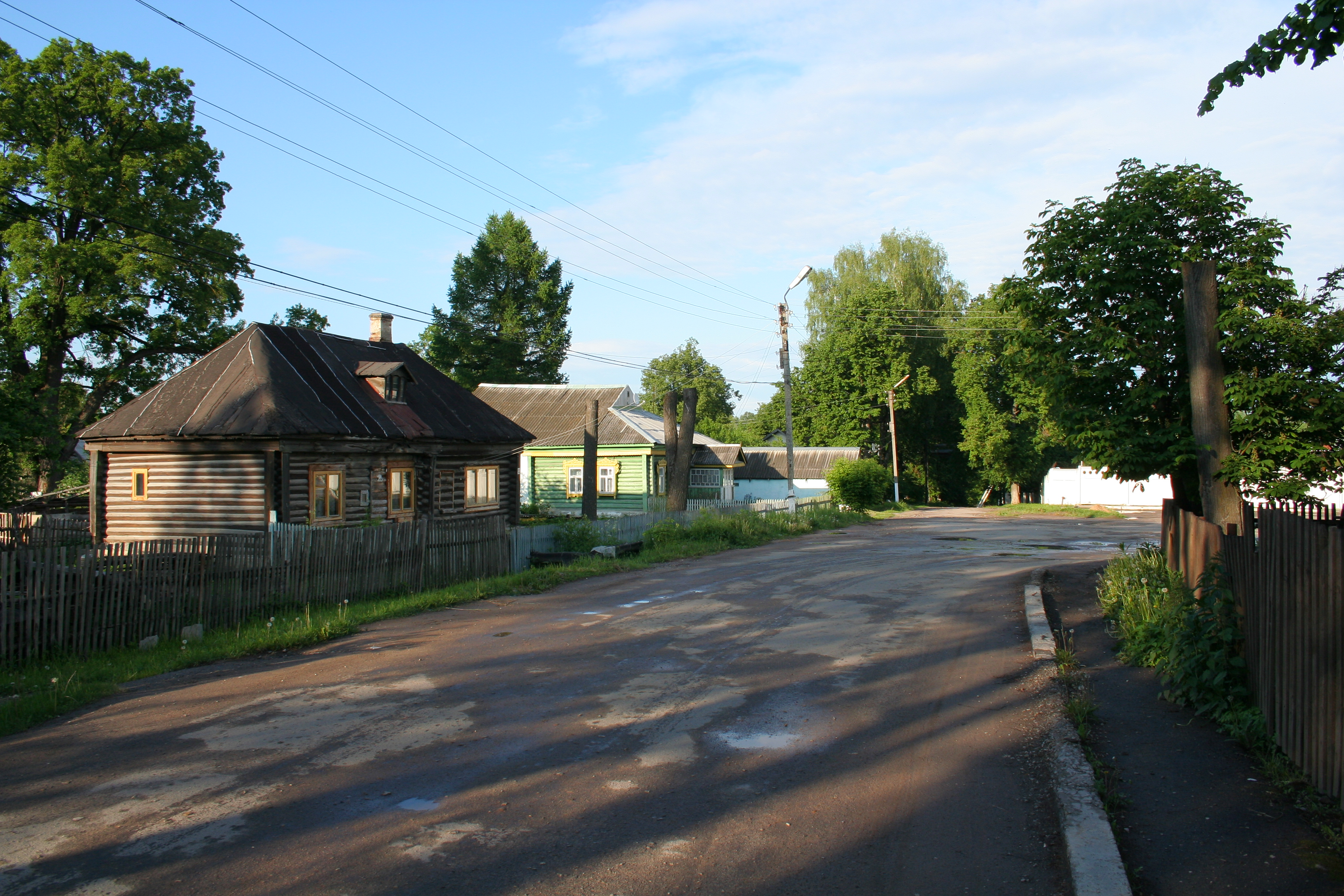
- In Kondrovo
- Interactive map of Kondrovo
- Location of Kondrovo Kondrovo (Kaluga Oblast)
- Coordinates: 54°48′N 35°56′E
- Country: Russia
- Federal subject: Kaluga Oblast
- Administrative district: Dzerzhinsky District
- Founded: 1615
- Town status since: 1938
- Elevation: 150 m (490 ft)

Population (2010 Census)
  - Total: 16,672
  - Estimate (2023): 15,734 (−5.6%)

Administrative status
  - Capital of: Dzerzhinsky District

Municipal status
  - Municipal district: Dzerzhinsky Municipal District
  - Urban settlement: Kondrovo Urban Settlement
  - Capital of: Dzerzhinsky Municipal District, Kondrovo Urban Settlement
- Time zone: UTC+3 (MSK)
- Postal code: 249830–249834
- OKTMO ID: 29608101001

Kondrovo (Russian: Ко́ндрово) is a town and the administrative center of Dzerzhinsky District in Kaluga Oblast, Russia, located on the Shanya River (a tributary of the Ugra in the Oka's basin), 40 kilometers (25 mi) northwest of Kaluga, the administrative center of the oblast. Population: 15,734 (2021 census); 16,672 (2010 census); 17,177 (2002 census); 17,212 (1989 Soviet census).

== History ==
Originally known as Kondyrevo (Кондырево), it was a votchina of Dmitry Kondyrin, a Russian voyevoda who was granted these lands for his service during the second war with the Grand Duchy of Lithuania in 1500–1501. The settlement's name gradually changed to Kondrovo by the 1840s.

In 1790, a paper mill was built in the village, and by the end of the 19th century it became famous for its high quality paper.

Town status was granted to Kondrovo in 1938.

During World War II, Kondrovo was occupied by the German Army from October 9, 1941 to January 19, 1942.

== Administrative and municipal status ==
Within the framework of administrative divisions, Kondrovo serves as the administrative center of Dzerzhinsky District, to which it is directly subordinated. As a municipal division, the town of Kondrovo is incorporated within Dzerzhinsky Municipal District as Kondrovo Urban Settlement.

== Economy ==
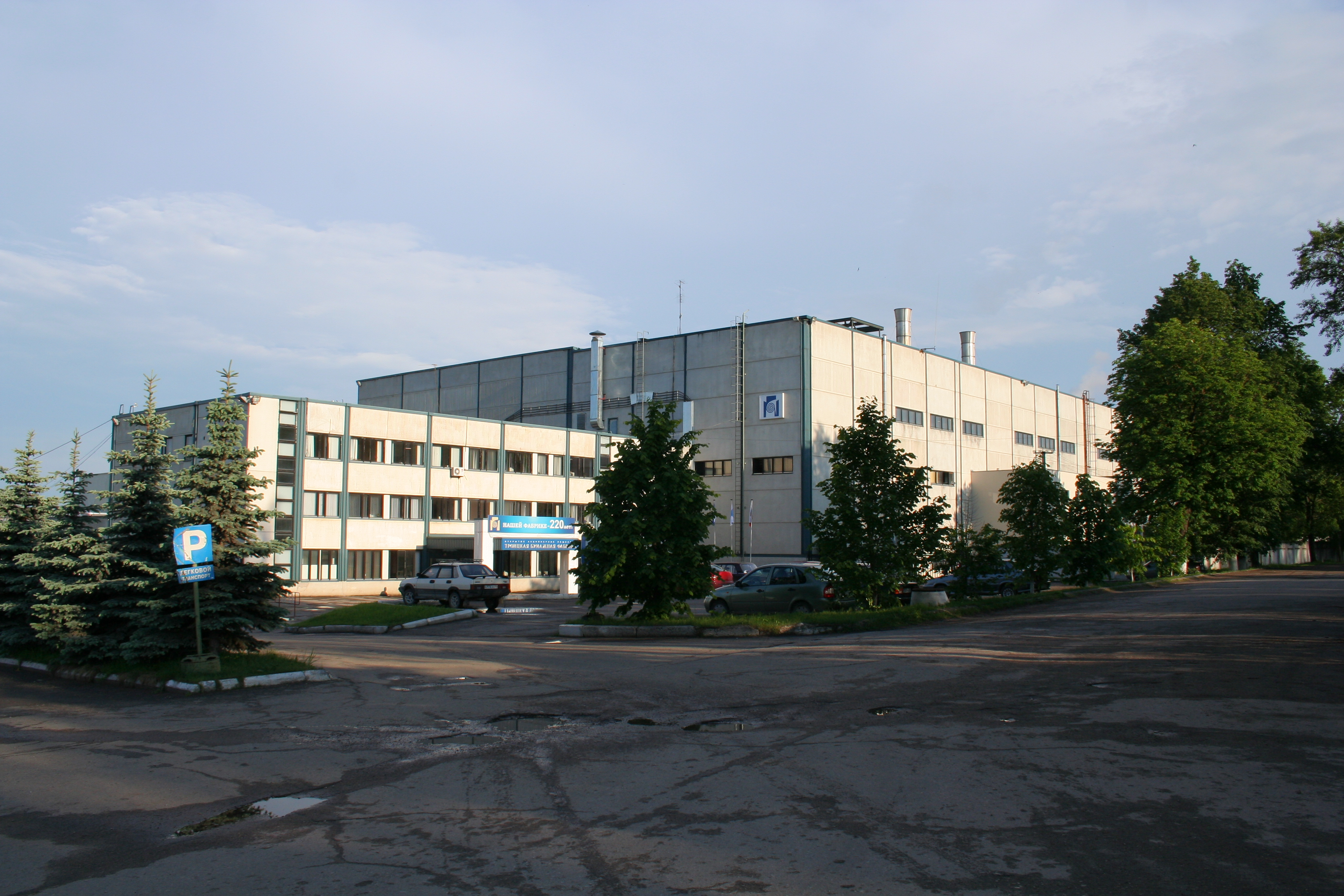
KBK paper mill

The town's paper mill KBK (Kodrovskaya Bumazhnaya Kompaniya) is still the main industrial enterprise. It produces parchment, notebooks, toilet paper, and female hygiene articles.
