= Borovsky District =

Borovsky District Боровский район (Russian)
- District
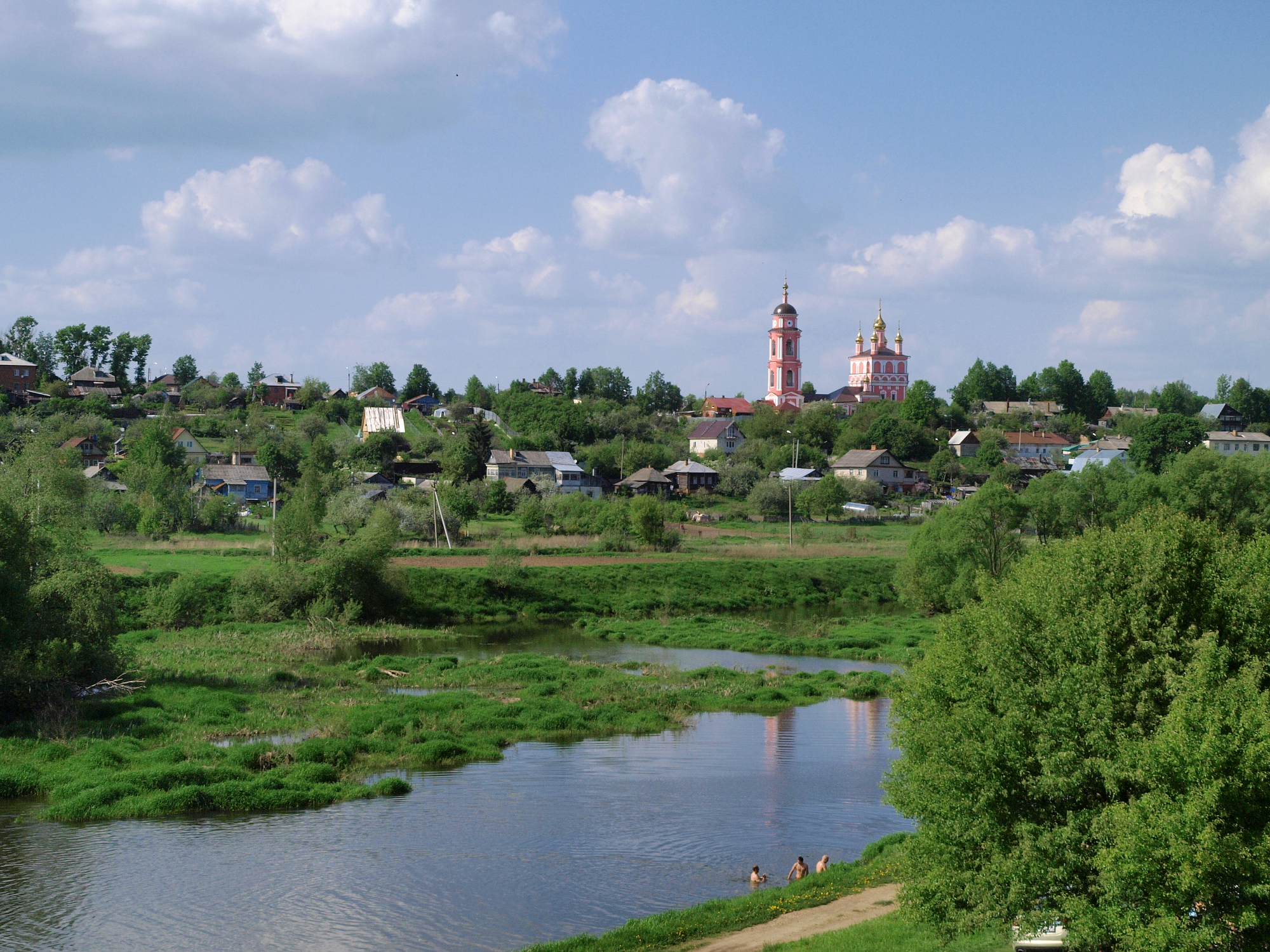
- Borovsk, across the Protva River

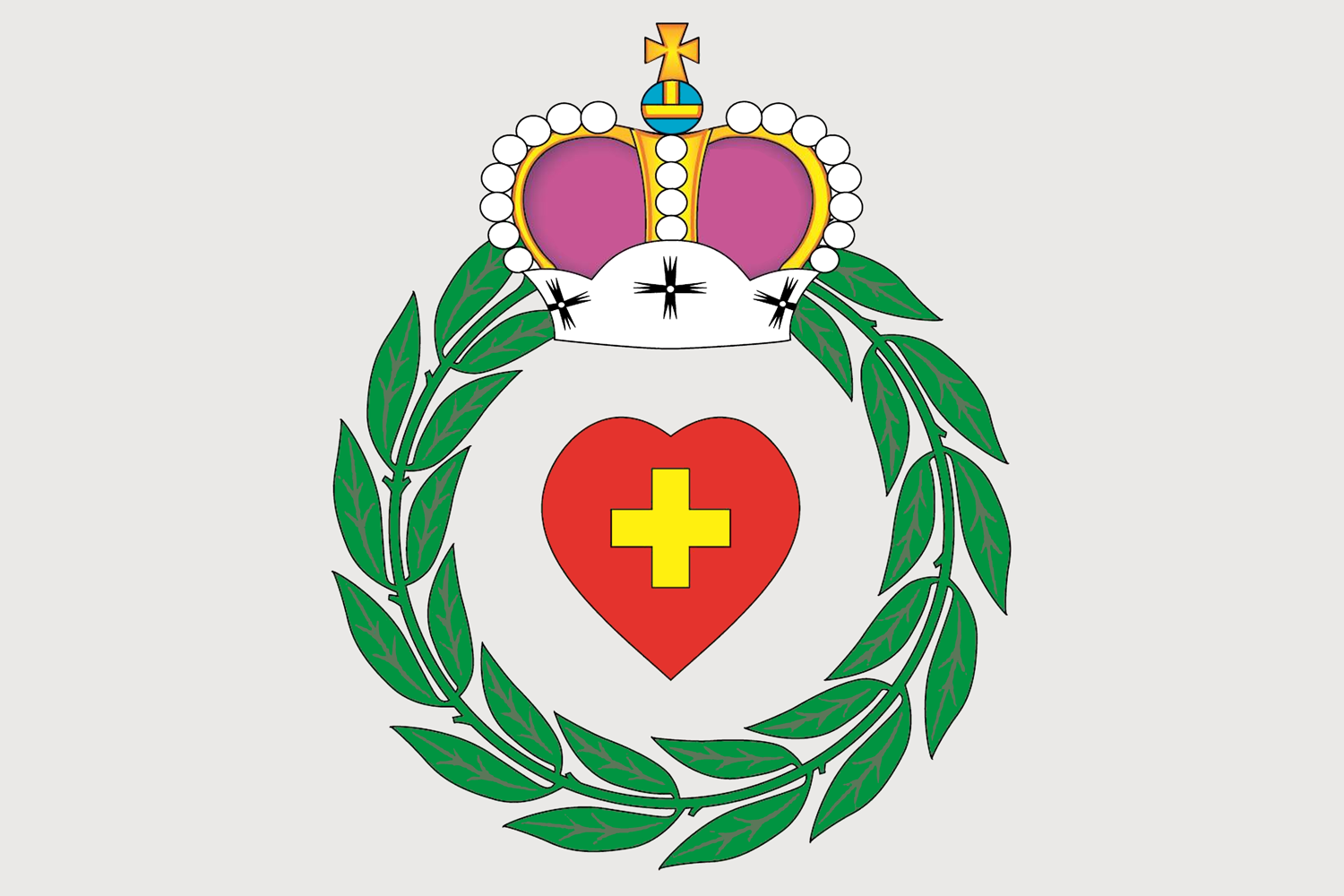
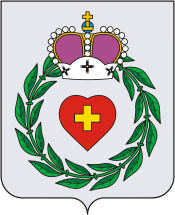
- Flag Coat of arms
- Location of Borovsky District in Kaluga Oblast
- Coordinates: 55.202°N 36.133°E
- Country: Russia
- Federal subject: Kaluga Oblast
- Established: 12 July 1929
- Administrative center: Borovsk

Area
  - Total: 759.6 km^{2} (293.3 sq mi)

Population (2010 Census)
  - Total: 61,401
  - Density: 80.83/km^{2} (209.4/sq mi)
  - Urban: 79.9%
  - Rural: 20.1%

Administrative structure
  - Inhabited localities: 3 cities/towns, 112 rural localities

Municipal structure
  - Municipally incorporated as: Borovsky Municipal District
  - Municipal divisions: 3 urban settlements, 5 rural settlements
- Time zone: UTC+3 (MSK)
- OKTMO ID: 29606000
- Website: http://www.borovskr.ru/

Borovsky District (Russian: Боровский райо́н) is an administrative and municipal district (raion), one of the twenty-four in Kaluga Oblast, Russia. It is located in the north of the oblast. The area of the district is 759.6 square kilometers (293.3 sq mi). Its administrative center is the town of Borovsk. Population: 76,097 (2021 census); 61,401 (2010 census); 54,661 (2002 Census); 53,698 (1989 Soviet census). The population of Borovsk accounts for 16.6% of the district's total population.
