= Kozelsky District =

Kozelsky District Козельский район (Russian)
- District
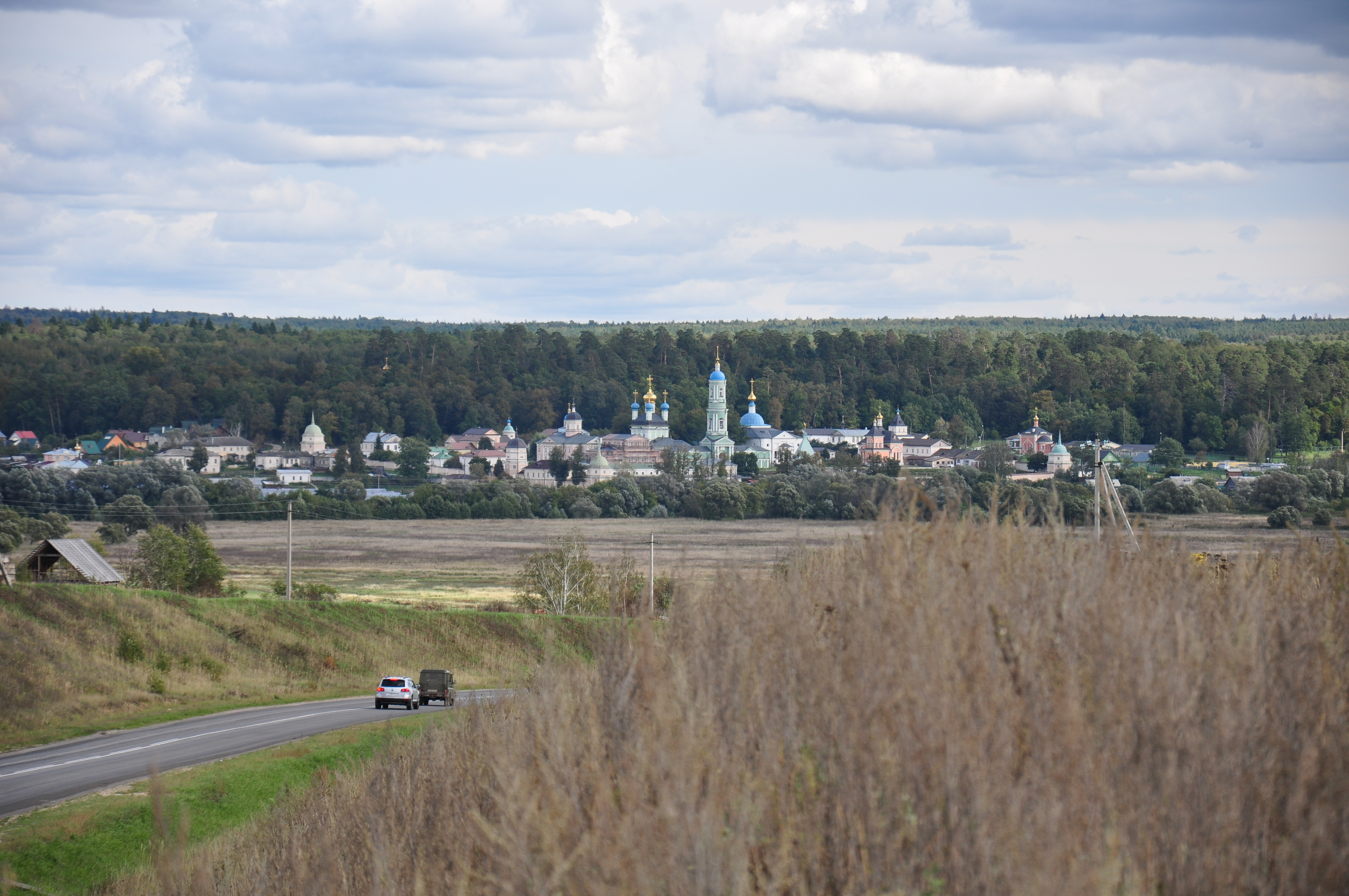
- Optina Monastery, Kozelsky District

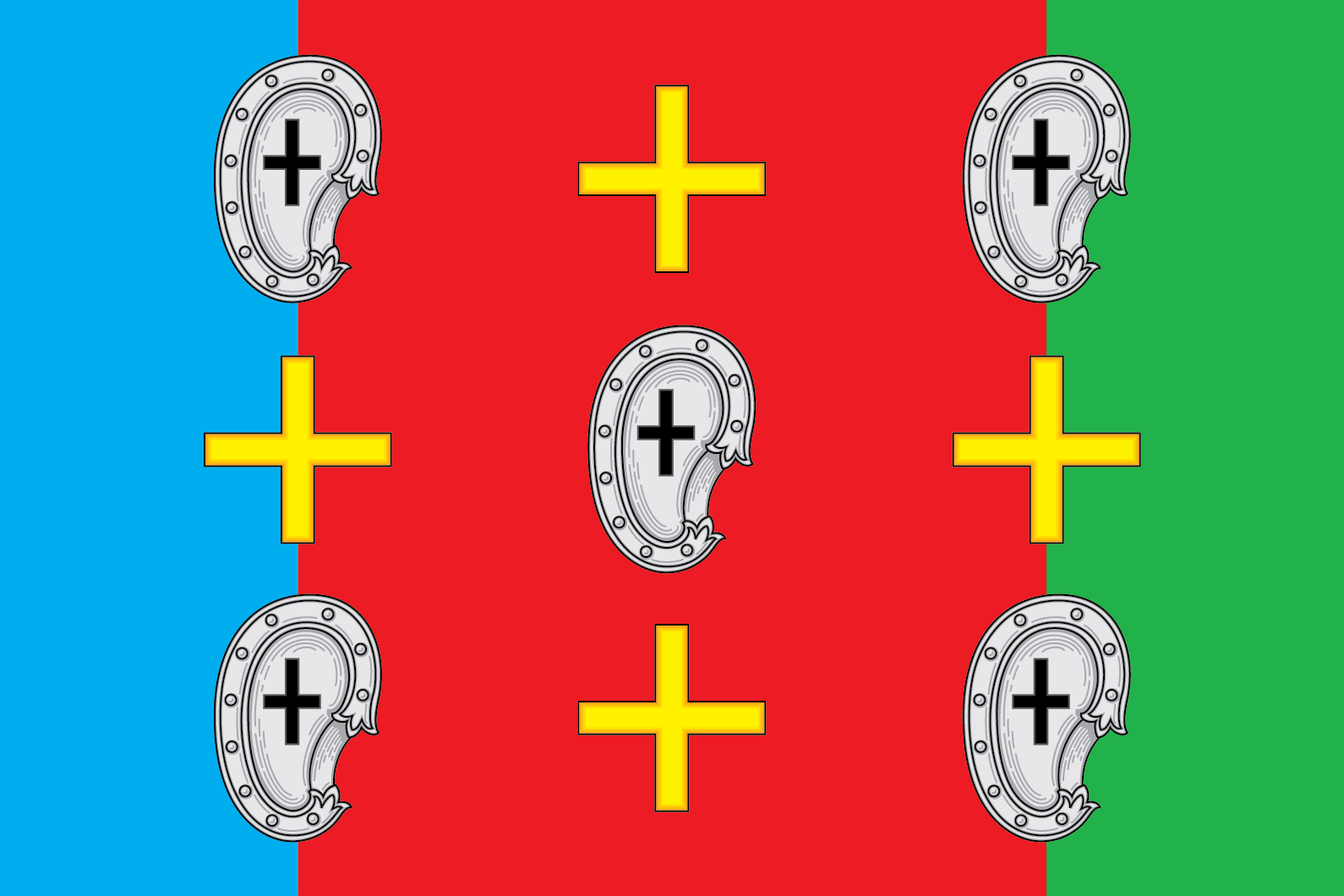
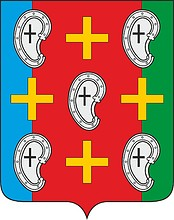
- Flag Coat of arms
- Location of Kozelsky District in Kaluga Oblast
- Coordinates: 54°02′N 35°47′E
- Country: Russia
- Federal subject: Kaluga Oblast
- Established: 1 October 1929
- Administrative center: Kozelsk

Area
  - Total: 1,523 km^{2} (588 sq mi)

Population (2010 Census)
  - Total: 41,802
  - Density: 27.45/km^{2} (71.09/sq mi)
  - Urban: 73.3%
  - Rural: 26.7%

Administrative structure
  - Inhabited localities: 2 cities/towns, 173 rural localities

Municipal structure
  - Municipally incorporated as: Kozelsky Municipal District
  - Municipal divisions: 2 urban settlements, 14 rural settlements
- Time zone: UTC+3 (MSK)
- OKTMO ID: 29616000
- Website: http://www.kozelskadm.ru/

Kozelsky District (Russian: Козе́льский райо́н) is an administrative and municipal district (raion), one of the twenty-four in Kaluga Oblast, Russia. It is located in the southeast of the oblast. The area of the district is 1,523 square kilometers (588 sq mi). Its administrative center is the town of Kozelsk. Population: 38,596 (2021 census); 41,802 (2010 census); 44,775 (2002 Census); 47,822 (1989 Soviet census). The population of Kozelsk accounts for 43.4% of the district's total population.
