= Dzerzhinsky District, Kaluga Oblast =

Dzerzhinsky District Дзержинский район (Russian)
- District
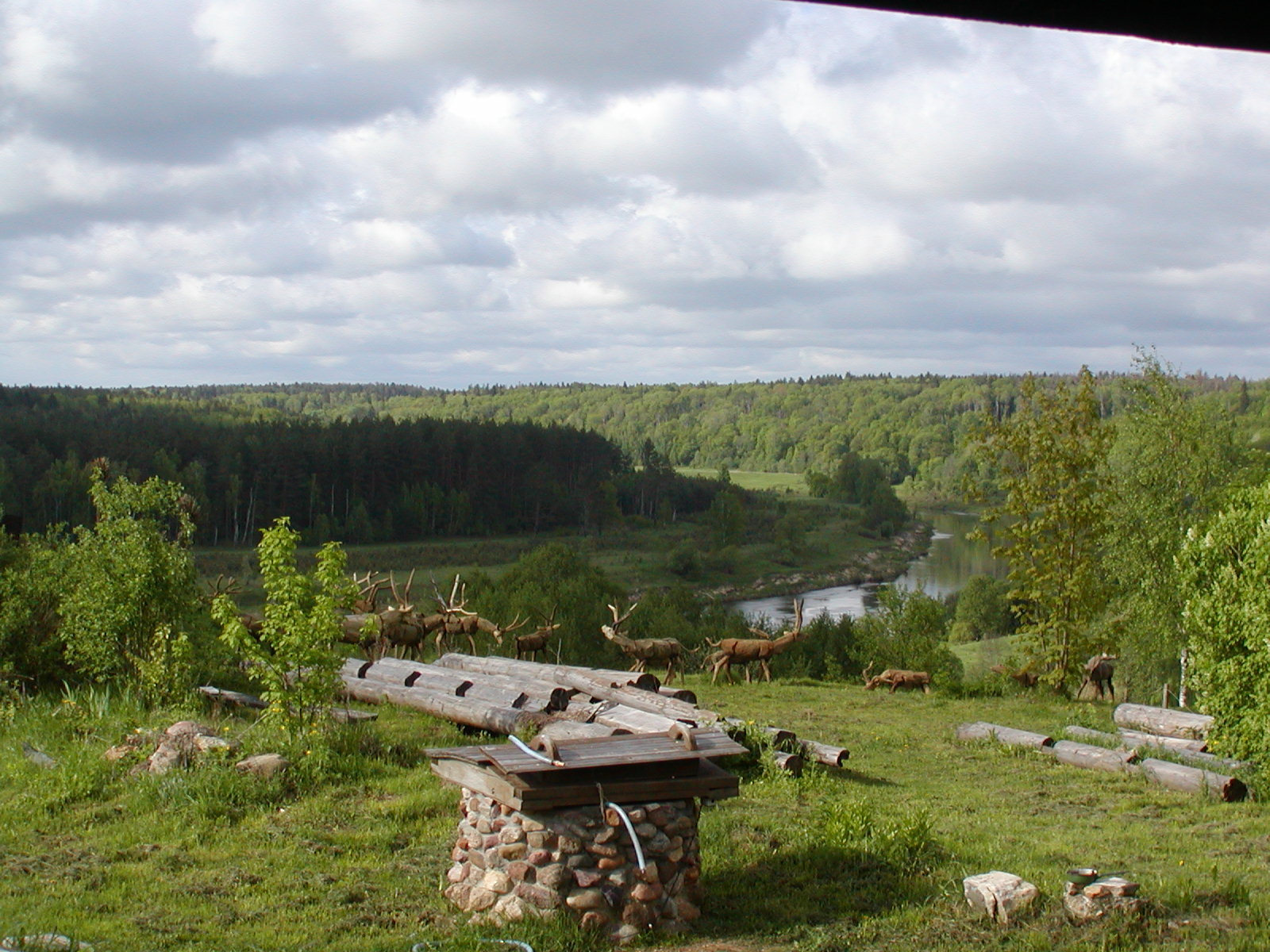
- View from the window of Nikolay Polissky's house, Dzherzhinsky District.JPG

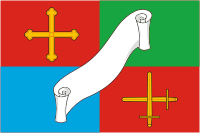
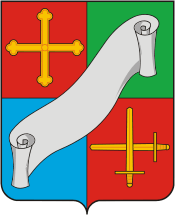
- Flag Coat of arms
- Location of Dzerzhinsky District in Kaluga Oblast
- Coordinates: 54°48′N 35°56′E
- Country: Russia
- Federal subject: Kaluga Oblast
- Established: 1 October 1929
- Administrative center: Kondrovo

Area
  - Total: 1,290 km^{2} (500 sq mi)

Population (2010 Census)
  - Total: 60,377
  - Density: 46.8/km^{2} (121/sq mi)
  - Urban: 70.5%
  - Rural: 29.5%

Administrative structure
  - Inhabited localities: 1 cities/towns, 3 urban-type settlements, 163 rural localities

Municipal structure
  - Municipally incorporated as: Dzerzhinsky Municipal District
  - Municipal divisions: 4 urban settlements, 13 rural settlements
- Time zone: UTC+3 (MSK)
- OKTMO ID: 29608000
- Website: http://www.admkondrovo.ru

Dzerzhinsky District (Russian: Дзержи́нский райо́н) is an administrative and municipal district (raion), one of the twenty-four in Kaluga Oblast, Russia. It is located in the northern central part of the oblast. The area of the district is 1,290 square kilometers (500 sq mi). Its administrative center is the town of Kondrovo. Population: 56,470 (2021 census); 60,377 (2010 census); 61,159 (2002 Census); 59,599 (1989 Soviet census). The population of Kondrovo accounts for 27.9% of the district's total population.

== Administrative and municipal status ==
Administratively, the district is not divided into smaller units and has direct jurisdiction over 1 town (Kondrovo), 3 settlements of urban type, and 163 rural localities. Municipally, the territory of the district is incorporated as Dzerzhinsky Municipal District.
