= Kaluga Oblast =

First-level administrative division of Russia

Kaluga Oblast Калужская область (Russian)
- Oblast
- Flag Coat of arms

- Coordinates: 54°26′N 35°26′E
- Country: Russia
- Federal district: Central
- Economic region: Central
- Established: July 5, 1944
- Administrative center: Kaluga

Government
  - Body: Legislative Assembly
  - Governor: Vladislav Shapsha

Area
  - Total: 29,777 km^{2} (11,497 sq mi)
  - Rank: 64th

Population (2021 census)
  - Total: 1,069,904
  - Estimate (2018): 1,012,156
  - Rank: 45th
  - Density: 35.931/km^{2} (93.060/sq mi)
  - Urban: 75.0%
  - Rural: 25.0%

GDP (nominal, 2024)
  - Total: ₽913 billion (US$10.71 billion)
  - Per capita: ₽855,283 (US$10,036.06)
- Time zone: UTC+3 (MSK)
- ISO 3166 code: RU-KLU
- License plates: 40
- OKTMO ID: 29000000
- Official languages: Russian
- Website: http://www.admobl.kaluga.ru/

Kaluga Oblast (Russian: Калу́жская о́бласть, romanized: Kaluzhskaya oblastʹ) is a federal subject of Russia (an oblast). Its administrative center is the city of Kaluga. The 2021 Russian Census found a population of 1,069,904.

== Geography ==
Kaluga Oblast lies in the central part of the East European Plain. The oblast's territory is located between the Central Russian Upland (with and average elevation of above 200 metres (660 ft) and a maximum elevation of 275 metres (902 ft) in the southeast), the Smolensk–Moscow Upland, and the Dnieper–Desna watershed. Most of the oblast is occupied by plains, fields, and forests with diverse flora and fauna. The administrative center is located on the Baryatino-Sukhinichy plain. The western part of the oblast — located within the drift plain — is dominated by the Spas-Demensk ridge. To the south is an outwash plain that is part of the Bryansk-Zhizdra woodlands, with average elevation up to 200 m.

From north to south, Kaluga Oblast extends for more than 220 km (140 mi), from 53°30′ to 55°30′ north latitude, and east to west – for 220 km. Its area is 29,800 square kilometres (11,500 sq mi).

The oblast's territory is crossed by major international motor and railways, linking Kaluga with Moscow, Bryansk, Kyiv, Lviv and Warsaw.

Kaluga Oblast borders on:

- Bryansk Oblast to the south-west
- Oryol Oblast to the south
- Tula Oblast to the east
- Moscow Oblast to the north-east
- Smolensk Oblast to the north-west
- the federal city of Moscow (from July 1, 2012)

=== Climate ===
The climate of Kaluga Oblast is moderately continental with distinct seasons: warm and humid summers, and cold winters with stable snow-cover. The average temperature in July is +18 °C (64 °F) in north and +20 °C (68 °F) in south, and in January −11 °C (12 °F) in northeast and −8 °C (18 °F) in southwest. The duration of the warm period (with the average temperatures above zero) is 215–220 days. The territory of the oblast is exposed to a substantial amount of solar radiation — around 115 Kcal per cm^{2}. The average annual air temperature varies from 3.5–4.0 °C (38.3–39.2 °F) in the north and the north-east to up to 4.0–4.6 °C (39.2–40.3 °F) in the west and the east of the oblast. The duration of the frost-free season is 113 to 127 days. The northern part of the oblast is the coldest, while the central part is moderately cold. In the south, in the zone of forest steppes, the climate is relatively warm. Precipitation is distributed unevenly, varying from 780 to 826 millimetres (30.7–32.5 in) in the north and the west and up to 690–760 millimetres (27–30 in) in the south.

=== Hydrography ===
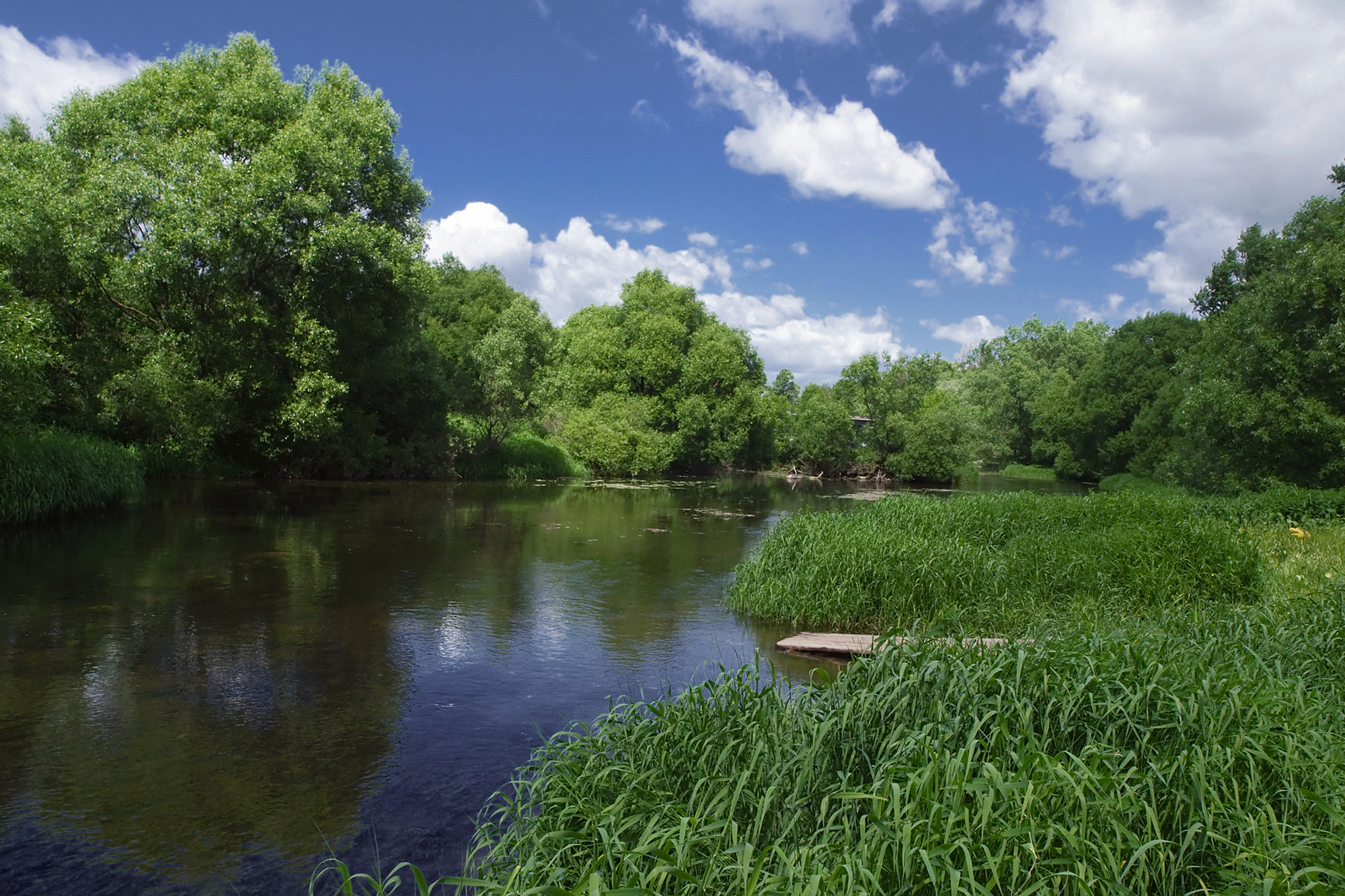
Protva River flowing through the oblast near Borovsk

The Oka is the main river in the oblast's river system. Other rivers include the Ugra, the Zhizdra, the Protva, and the Vorya. Large lakes: Bezdon and Svyatoye.

=== Vegetation ===
As of 2006, the total area occupied by forests is around 1,380,000 ha (5,300 sq mi, 46% of the territory of the oblast). As of the beginning of 2005, agricultural lands occupied an area of 1,350,000 ha (5,200 sq mi, 44% of the territory). The main crops grown include forage cereals, potatoes, vegetables, and feed grains (wheat, barley, rye, oats, buckwheat), and fiber-flax.

=== Fauna ===
Mammals include typical forest animals: brown bear, lynx, elk, beaver, wolf, polar hare, and squirrel. The south of the oblast is sometimes visited by bison that were recently released into the Orlovskoye Polesye national park. Aquatic fauna includes two kinds of lamprey and 41 species of bony fish. The diversity of fish is explained by the variety of habitats. Among 11 kinds of amphibians, the most common are crested and common newts, red-bellied, common and green toads, and various lake, pool, moor and grass frogs. Reptiles are represented by 7 species, including snakes: the venomous adder and the harmless water snake and smooth snake.

There are 267 types of birds registered as visiting the oblast, including 177 to nest, 58 to migrate and 32 to occasionally transit. The most significant bird-of-prey habitats are located in the Kaluzhskiye Zaseki Nature Reserve and the interfluve of the Vytebet and the Resseta. The largest populations are: waterfowl - mallard; semi-aquatic – black-headed gull; in forest – chaffinch, chiffchaff; along river banks – sand martin; in settlements – feral pigeon, common swift, rook, tree sparrow.

=== Conservation and ecological condition ===
According to the governmental report On the Status of the Environment and Its Conservation in the Russian Federation published by the Russian Ministry of Natural Resources and Environment, Kaluga Oblast is one of the most ecologically pure regions of the Central Federal District. There are several successful eco-settlements: the nature reserve Kaluzhskiye Zaseki, the Ugra National Park, the Tarusa natural reserve, and the Kaluzhski Bor natural sanctuary.

The Chernobyl disaster resulted in radioactive contamination in the oblast's south and southwest. Radiation monitoring is conducted in nine districts. The radiation background complies with the established radiation situation.

== History ==
The territory of Kaluga Oblast has been inhabited since ancient times. Through the province of Kaluga flows the Tarusa River, which could give an indication of the history and origin of the Russian people. The oldest human sites discovered by archeologists date back to the Mesolithic period (10,000–6,000 BC). The first mentions of Kaluga's towns are associated with events in the 12th century, specifically, the feudal war between the Olegovichi and the Monomakhovichi (Kozelsk — 1146, Serensk — 1147, Vorotynsk — 1155, Mosalsk — 1231).

In the 14th century, Kaluga lands were places of constant confrontations between Lithuania and Moscow. Traditionally, it is considered that Kaluga was established as a frontier settlement to protect the Moscow principality from Lithuania's attacks. Around half of the current province with the western and southern parts and the towns of Kozelsk, Mosalsk, Meshchovsk, Serpeysk, Peremyshl and Vorotynsk were part of Lithuania in the late 14th-15th centuries.

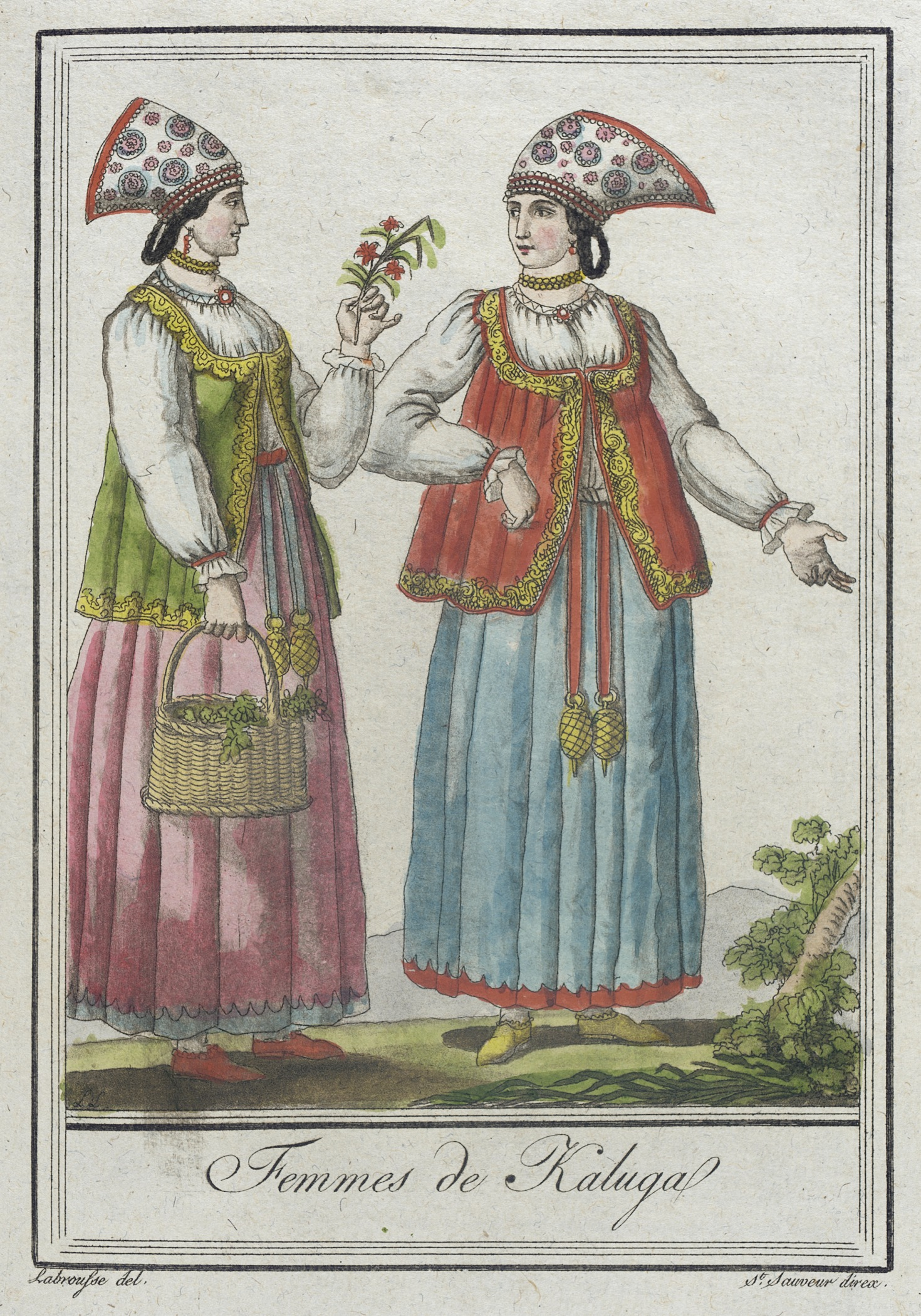
Women from Kaluga Governorate wearing traditional Russian dress

Between 1480–1481, Kaluga's territory was the place of the Great Stand on the Ugra River, resulting in the liberation of Russian lands from the Tatar yoke, and Moscow's transformation into a sovereign state.

In the 16th and 17th centuries, with active development of trade and crafts, the city advanced in the arts of wood-carving and jewelry-making. After the formal union of Russia and Ukraine established in 1654, Kaluga's role as a trade intermediary between Moscow and Ukraine contributed also to its economic development.

On August 24, 1776, Catherine the Great issued a decree establishing Kaluga Viceroyalty to unite the Kaluga and Tula Governorates. The center of the viceroyalty acquired a new image. In 1795, during the rule of Paul I, the Kaluga Viceroyalty was transformed into a governorate.

During World War II, Kozelsk housed a Soviet prisoner-of-war camp for Poles, captured during the Soviet invasion of Poland in 1939, who were then murdered in the Katyn massacre in 1940. In 1941, the territory was captured by Nazi Germany, and then was liberated from German occupation by the Soviet Army's 10th, 16th, 33rd, 43rd, 49th, 50th, and 61st Armies, the 20th Tank Brigade, 1st Air Army, 1st Cavalry Corps, and the Normandy squadron.

The modern oblast was founded in accordance with the decree of the Presidium of the Supreme Soviet of the USSR on July 5, 1944. After the dissolution of the Soviet Union, Kaluga Oblast became a federal subject of the Russian Federation. In March 1996, the Charter of Kaluga Oblast was adopted.

== Demographics ==
Historical population
Year	Pop.	±%
1897	1,132,843	—
1926	1,151,591	+1.7%
1959	935,852	−18.7%
1970	994,876	+6.3%
1979	1,006,973	+1.2%
1989	1,066,833	+5.9%
2002	1,041,641	−2.4%
2010	1,010,930	−2.9%
2021	1,069,904	+5.8%
Source: Census data

1,069,904 (2021 census); 1,010,930 (2010 census); 1,041,641 (2002 census); 1,066,833 (1989 Soviet census).

Vital statistics for 2024:

- Births: 7,981 (7.5 per 1,000)
- Deaths: 14,152 (13.3 per 1,000)

Total fertility rate (2024):
1.33 children per woman

Life expectancy (2021):
Total — 69.16 years (male — 64.31, female — 74.12)

=== Settlements ===
Largest cities or towns in Kaluga Oblast 2010 Russian Census
Rank		Administrative Division	Pop.
1	Kaluga	City of oblast significance of Kaluga	324,698
2	Obninsk	City of oblast significance of Obninsk	104,739
3	Lyudinovo	Lyudinovsky District	40,530
4	Kirov	Kirovsky District	31,882
5	Maloyaroslavets	Maloyaroslavetsky District	30,392
6	Balabanovo	Borovsky District	26,337
7	Kozelsk	Kozelsky District	18,245
8	Kondrovo	Dzerzhinsky District	16,672
9	Sukhinichi	Sukhinichsky District	16,273
10	Tovarkovo	Dzerzhinsky District	14,496

=== Population ===
In 2021, Kaluga Oblast had a population of 1,069,904. Previously, according to the results of the 2010 Census, the population of the oblast was 1,010,930; down from 1,041,641 recorded in the 2002 Census, and further down from 1,066,833 recorded in the 1989 Census.

Ethnic composition (2021)

Ethnic Groups	Population	Percentage
Russians	906,533	90.4%
Tajiks	18,715	1.9%
Armenians	12,519	1.2%
Uzbeks	12,084	1.2%
Ukrainians	8,848	0.9%
Others	44,656	4.5%
Ethnicity not stated	66,549	–

=== Religion ===
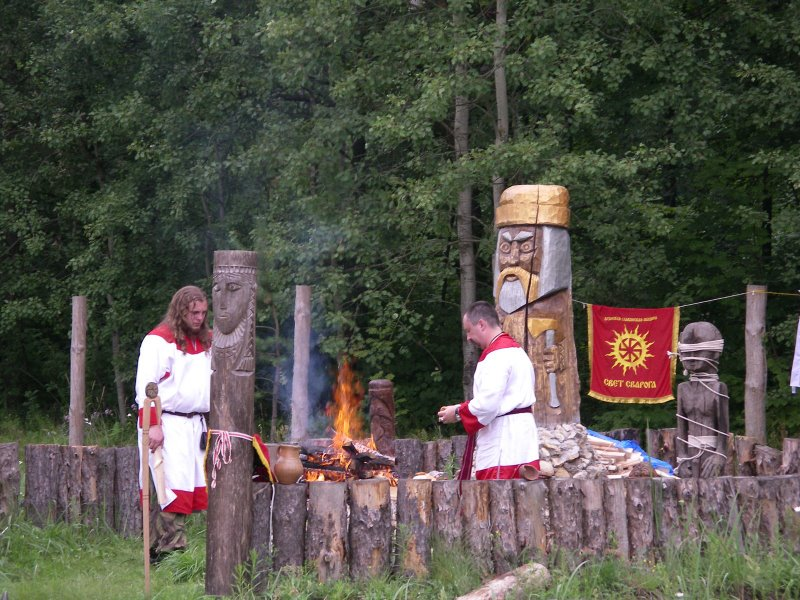
A Rodnover temple in Kaluga countryside.

Religion in Kaluga Oblast as of 2012 (Sreda Arena Atlas)
Russian Orthodoxy	48.6%
Other Orthodox	2%
Old Believers	0.6%
Other Christians	7.9%
Islam	0.6%
Rodnovery and other native faiths	1.6%
Spiritual but not religious	25.9%
Atheism and irreligion	8.9%
Other and undeclared	3.9%

Kaluga Oblast is a centre of the Slavic native faith (Rodnovery) movement, being the headquarters of the Union of Slavic Native Faith (Rodnover) Communities (Союз Славянских Общин Славянской Родной Веры) located in Kaluga city. The region has many temples dedicated to the Slavic gods.

== Administrative and municipal divisions ==
Within the framework of administrative divisions, the oblast is divided into twenty-four districts and four cities of oblast significance.

Within the framework of municipal divisions, the territories of the administrative districts are incorporated into twenty-four municipal districts and the territories of the two cities of oblast significance are incorporated as urban okrugs. Two other cities of oblast significance are incorporated as urban settlements within corresponding municipal districts.

== Economy ==
The Kaluga Province is one of the most economically-advanced provinces of the Russian Federation. Major international corporations implementing projects in the region include: Volkswagen, Volvo, Peugeot, Citroen, Mitsubishi, GE, Samsung, Continental, Berlin-Chemie/Menarini, Novo Nordisk, STADA CIS, and others. There is active development in traditional economic segments, as well, represented by manufacturers of turbo generators and gas turbine engines, railway equipment, building materials, electronics, optical systems among others.

=== Industry ===
The economic policy being pursued in the Kaluga Province changed the structure of its industrial complex and created conditions for the development of high tech production companies. There are 2,747 different enterprises in the region that generate about 40% of gross regional product (GRP) and more than half of tax payments to the provincial budget. Almost a third of the province's residents are employed in industry.

The traditional foundation of the province's industry is the automotive complex.

=== Science and training ===
- Obninsk Institute of Nuclear Energy, a branch of the MIFI National Nuclear Research University with a medical department;
- The Tsiolkovsky State University in Kaluga;
- The Karpov Scientific and Research Institute of Physics and Chemistry, a branch of the Russian State Scientific Center;
- The Medical Radiology Scientific Center under the Russian Ministry of Public Health;
- The Leipunsky Institute of Physics and Energy.

=== Transportation ===
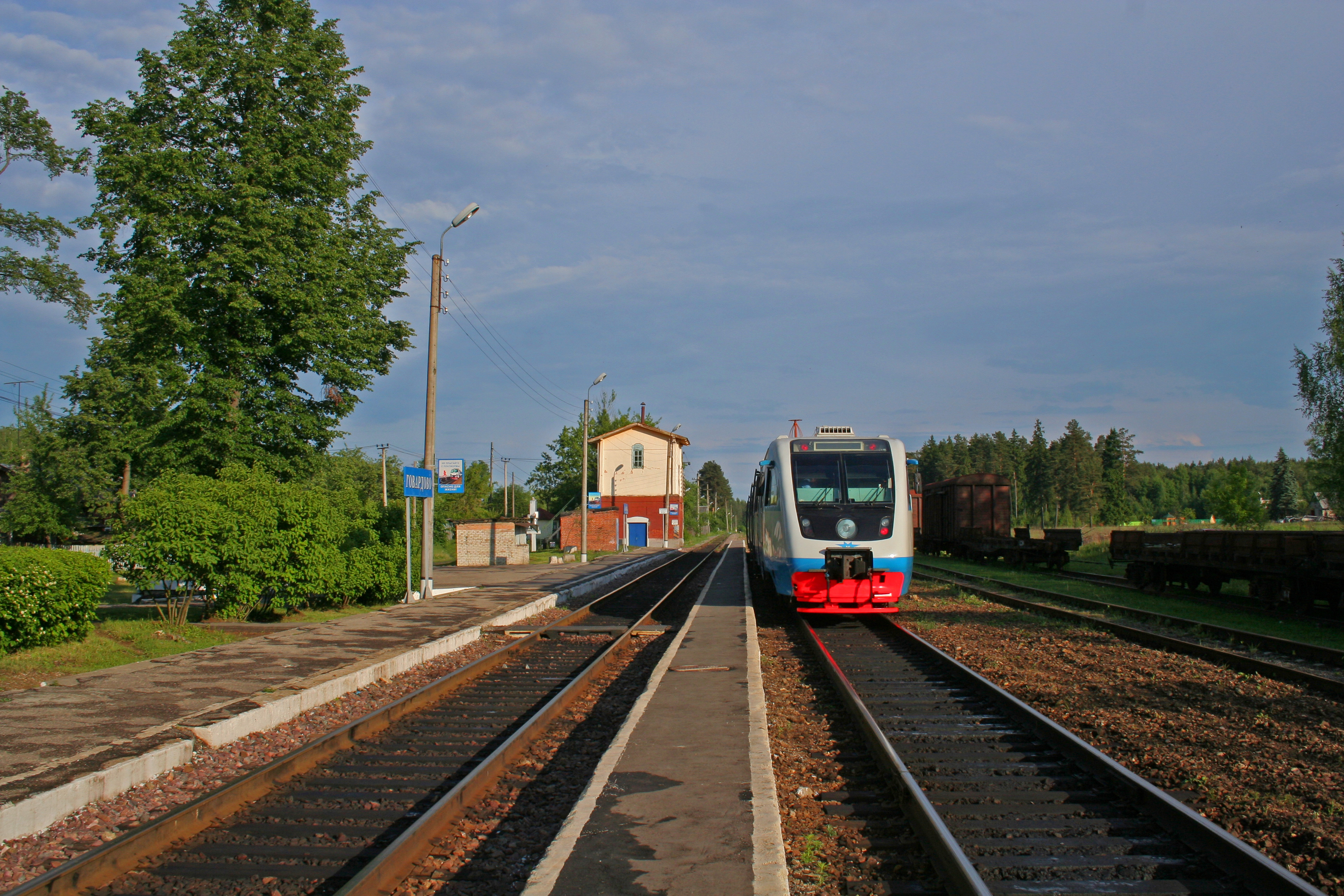
Railway station in Kondrovo

The main regional transport hubs are located in Kaluga, Obninsk, and Sukhinichi.

M3 "Ukraine" is the main automobile highway, with a traffic density of up to 13,800 vehicles/day, which passes through the towns of Balabanovo, Obninsk, Maloyaroslavets, Kaluga, Sukhinichi, and Zhizdra. An equally important role is played by Moscow – Warsaw federal highway, with a traffic density of up to 11,500 vehicles/day, which passes through Belousovo, Obninsk, Maloyaroslavets, Medyn, Yukhnov, and Spas-Demensk. In addition, there is also a highway of regional importance Vyazma-Kaluga-Tula-Ryazan, with a traffic density of up to 6,750 vehicles/day, and the road section M3 "Ukraine" which passes through the town of Balabanovo. The total length of automobile roads with hard surface is 6,564 km. The density of hard surface road network of common use is 165 km per 1,000 km^{2}.

The trunk railroad Moscow – Kiev is passing through Balabanovo, Obninsk, Maloyaroslavets, and Sukhinichi. In addition, there are also single-track diesel lines located in the oblast. There is a large locomotive and diesel multiple unit depot located in Kaluga. The total length of the railroads of common use is 872 km. The density of the railroads of common use is 29 km per 1000 km^{2}.

There are four airfields in the oblast, including Grabtsevo Airport located near the city of Kaluga (closed in 2008), military airfields in the town of Ermolino, and a large military airfield in Shaikovka.

The part of the Oka river flowing from Kaluga is one of the domestic waterways of Russia. There are tourist cruises from Serpukhov to Tarusa and from Serpukhov to Velegozh. In addition, there are two motor ships “Louch” operating along the Kaluga—Aleksin route. The total length of the navigable and conditionally navigable waterways is 101 km. Of special importance is Moscow – Kaluga express (3 departures a day, time en route – 2 hours and 40 minutes).

The city transportation in Kaluga has a well-developed trolleybus system.

== Tourism and recreation ==
The most popular areas among tourists are the administrative center of Kaluga, Optina Pustyn monastery, the City of Military Glory - Kozelsk, Obninsk Science Town, the towns of Maloyaroslavets and Meshchovsk where Napoleon's army was stopped, the Goncharovs country estate in the Polotnyany Zavod, Svyato-Tikhonova Pustyn monastery and Svyato-Pafnutyev Borovsky monastery, the town of Tarusa, and Vorobyi zoo. A number of various tourist paths have been opened in the unique nature reserves—Ugra National Park and Kaluzhskye Zaseki. There are 15 health centers and summer resorts with over 3,500 beds in Kaluga Oblast.

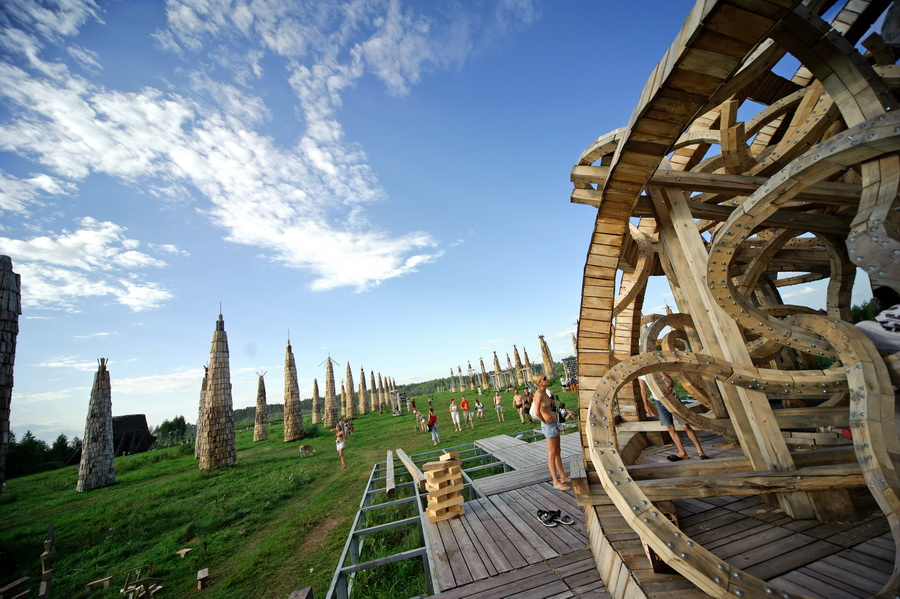
Archstoyanie

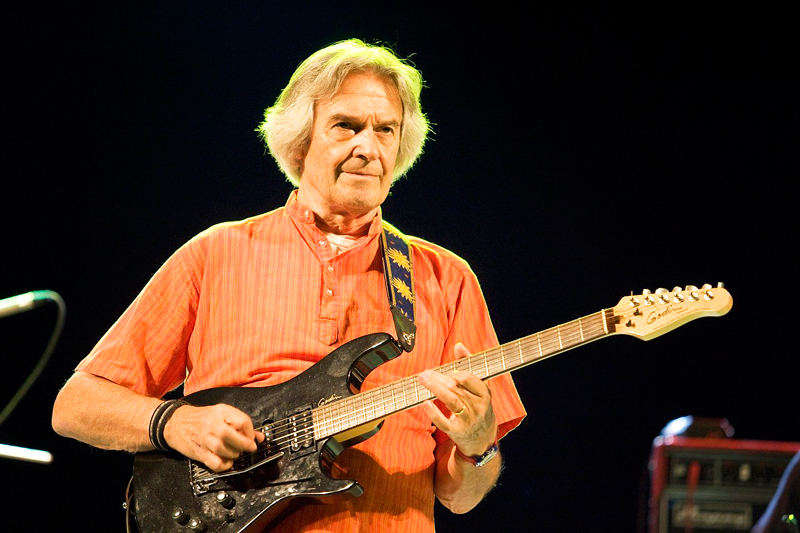
John McLaughlin in the Mir Gitary Festival

These are some of the regular events that are organized for tourists:

- Arkhistoyanie Festival
- Pustye Kholmy Festival
- Bike Festival in Maloyaroslavets
- Belyi Krolik Festival
- Mir Gitary Festival in Kaluga
- Zheleznye Devy Rock Music Festival in Kaluga

== Culture ==
As early as the 16th century, Kaluga was a major commercial port acting as a connecting link between Lithuania and Moscow. Back then, the city exported wooden utensils known far beyond the provincial boundaries. Starting in the 1680s, stone churches were built on the sites of wooden churches. By the latter half of the 18th century, there were 183 stone and 2235 wooden buildings in Kaluga. The 17th-century Korobov mansion with its semidomes and patterned cornices is a fine example of the civil architecture of the period.

=== Sports ===
FC Kaluga autonomous non-for-profit organization was established in December 2009 by the Ministry of Sports, Tourism and Youth Policy of Kaluga Oblast, the City Administration of Kaluga, and Galantus&K OOO. The Trustee Council is chaired by Kaluga Oblast Governor Anatoly D. Artamonov.

FC Kaluga won the tenth place in the Championship of Russia in the Center zone (2nd Division) of the 2010 season. As a result of the support that the Specialized Youth Football School of Olympic Reserve is receiving from the Kaluga Football Club, it is able to represent Kaluga Oblast in the Championship of Russia in four age groups. The trainings and football games of the official rounds of the Championship of Russia are held at the football stadium of Annenki Children and Youth Sports School.

=== Mass media ===
Nika FM radio and Nika TV station operate in Kaluga Oblast.

== Politics ==
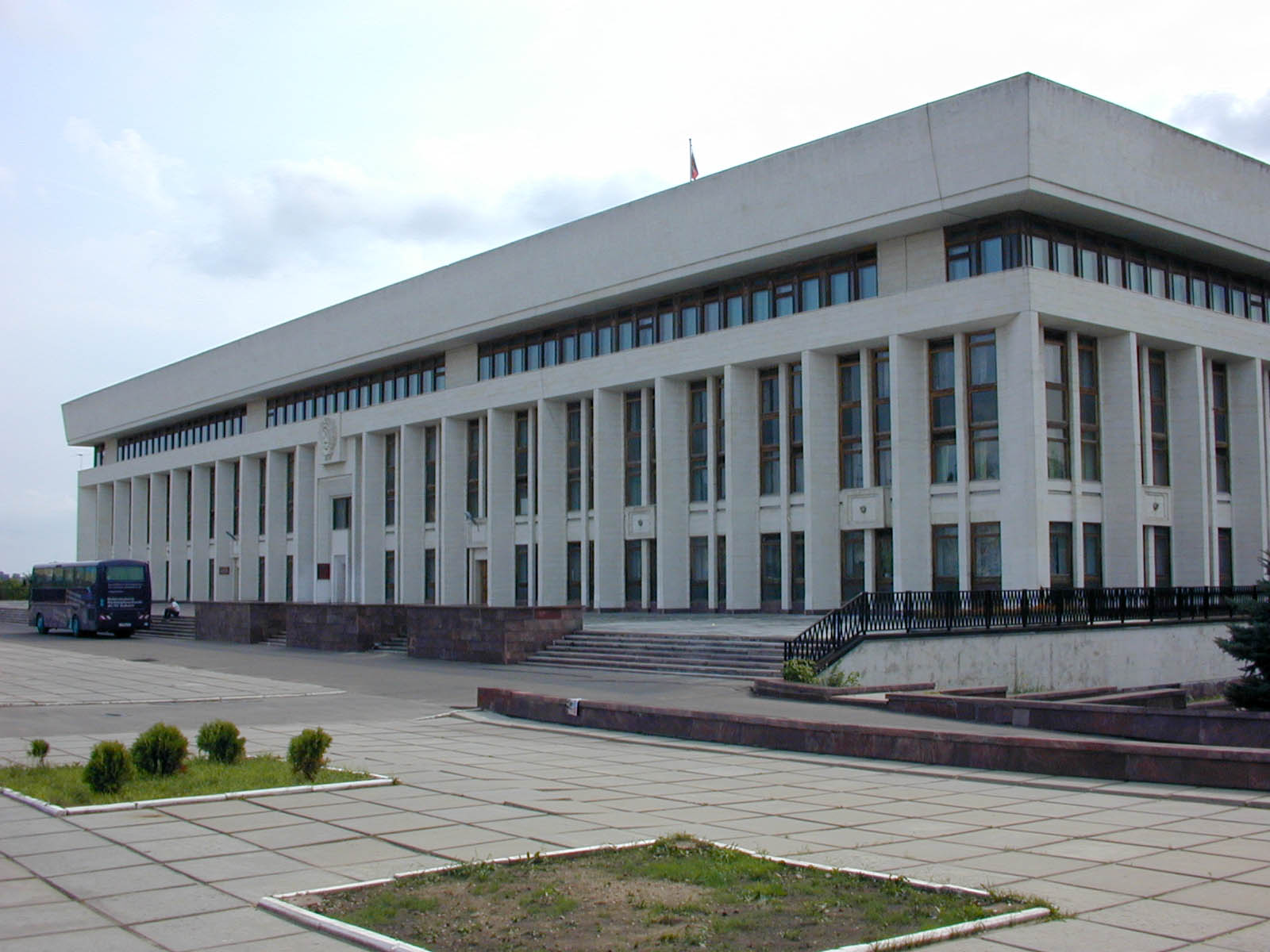
Kaluga Oblast Government building

The Charter of Kaluga Oblast is the fundamental law of the province. The Legislative Assembly of Kaluga Oblast is the province's standing legislative (representative) body. The highest executive body is the Oblast Government, which includes provincial executive bodies such as district administrations, committees, and commissions that facilitate development and run the day-to-day matters of the province. The oblast administration supports the activities of the governor, who is the highest official, and acts as guarantor of the observance of the oblast charter in accordance with the Constitution of Russia.

=== The Legislative Assembly of Kaluga Oblast ===
Viktor Sergeevich Baburin is the Chairman of the Legislative Assembly of Kaluga Oblast.

=== 2020 Legislative Assembly Elections of the 7th Convocation ===
The elections were won by United Russia party which received 42,43% of the votes. This allowed this party to win 29 seats in the oblast parliament.

- Communist Party of the Russian Federation — 12,90% of the votes (3 seats)
- LDPR — 8,60% (2)
- New People — 8,08% (2)
- A Just Russia — 8,01% (3)
- Party of Pensioners – 7,84% (1)

== Notable people ==
- Konstantin E. Tsiolkovsky (1857–1935) — rocket scientist.
- Saint Ambrose of Optina (1812–1891) — a minister of the Russian Orthodox Church, Hieromonk.

=== Born on the territory of modern Kaluga Oblast ===
- Georgy Zhukov (1896—1974), Soviet military leader, the Marshal of the Soviet Union (as of 1943)
- Eudoxia Lopukhina (1669—1731), Tsarina, the first wife of Peter the Great
- Yevdokiya Streshneva (1608—1645), Tsarina, the second wife of Mikhail Fedorovich Romanov
- Pafnuty Chebyshev (1821—1894), Russian mathematician and mechanical engineer
- Mikhail Yanshin (1902—1976), Soviet actor and film director
- Tatiana Shevtsova (born 1969), Russian Deputy Minister of Defence
- Ihor Yakivyuk (born 1968), Ukrainian civil engineer, Honored Builder of Ukraine

== See also ==
- Upper Oka Principalities
