= List of rural localities in Kaluga Oblast =

Map of Russia with Kaluga Oblast highlighted

This is a list of rural localities in Kaluga Oblast. Kaluga Oblast (Russian: Калу́жская о́бласть, Kaluzhskaya oblast) is a federal subject of Russia (an oblast). Its administrative center is the city of Kaluga. Population: 1,010,930 (2010 Census).

== Locations ==
- Avdeyevka
- Babynino, administrative center of Babyninsky District
- Baryatino
- Betlitsa
- Dugna
- Durakovo
- Ferzikovo
- Iznoski
- Khvastovichi
- Kosovo
- Kozlovo
- Moshonki
- Novozhdamirovo
- Peremyshl, administrative center of Peremyshlsky District
- Serpeysk
- Spas-Zagorye
- Tarutino
- Ulyanovo
- Vorotynsk

== See also ==
- Lists of rural localities in Russia
