= Kozlovo =

Kozlovo (Russian: Козлово) is the name of several inhabited localities in Russia.

== Modern localities ==
=== Astrakhan Oblast ===
As of 2010, one rural locality in Astrakhan Oblast bears this name:

- Kozlovo, Astrakhan Oblast, a selo in Kozlovsky Selsoviet of Volodarsky District

=== Bryansk Oblast ===
As of 2010, one rural locality in Bryansk Oblast bears this name:

- Kozlovo, Bryansk Oblast, a village in Bykhovsky Selsoviet of Komarichsky District

=== Irkutsk Oblast ===
As of 2010, one rural locality in Irkutsk Oblast bears this name:

- Kozlovo, Irkutsk Oblast, a selo in Kachugsky District

=== Ivanovo Oblast ===
As of 2010, two rural localities in Ivanovo Oblast bear this name:

- Kozlovo, Gavrilovo-Posadsky District, Ivanovo Oblast, a selo in Gavrilovo-Posadsky District
- Kozlovo, Privolzhsky District, Ivanovo Oblast, a village in Privolzhsky District

=== Kaluga Oblast ===
As of 2010, two rural localities in Kaluga Oblast bear this name:

- Kozlovo, Kaluga, Kaluga Oblast, a selo under the administrative jurisdiction of the City of Kaluga
- Kozlovo, Maloyaroslavetsky District, Kaluga Oblast, a selo in Maloyaroslavetsky District

=== Kemerovo Oblast ===
As of 2010, one rural locality in Kemerovo Oblast bears this name:

- Kozlovo, Kemerovo Oblast, a village in Lukoshinskaya Rural Territory of Topkinsky District

=== Kirov Oblast ===
As of 2010, one rural locality in Kirov Oblast bears this name:

- Kozlovo, Kirov Oblast, a village in Podgortsevsky Rural Okrug of Yuryansky District

=== Kostroma Oblast ===
As of 2010, three rural localities in Kostroma Oblast bear this name:

- Kozlovo, Kologrivsky District, Kostroma Oblast, a village in Sukhoverkhovskoye Settlement of Kologrivsky District
- Kozlovo, Kostromskoy District, Kostroma Oblast, a village in Kotovskoye Settlement of Kostromskoy District
- Kozlovo, Makaryevsky District, Kostroma Oblast, a village in Nezhitinskoye Settlement of Makaryevsky District

=== Krasnoyarsk Krai ===
As of 2010, one rural locality in Krasnoyarsk Krai bears this name:

- Kozlovo, Krasnoyarsk Krai, a village in Kazantsevsky Selsoviet of Shushensky District

=== Kurgan Oblast ===
As of 2010, one rural locality in Kurgan Oblast bears this name:

- Kozlovo, Kurgan Oblast, a village in Stanovskoy Selsoviet of Ketovsky District

=== Leningrad Oblast ===
As of 2010, one rural locality in Leningrad Oblast bears this name:

- Kozlovo, Leningrad Oblast, a logging depot settlement under the administrative jurisdiction of Kamennogorskoye Settlement Municipal Formation of Vyborgsky District

=== Moscow Oblast ===
As of 2010, five rural localities in Moscow Oblast bear this name:

- Kozlovo, Pavlovo-Posadsky District, Moscow Oblast, a village in Ulitinskoye Rural Settlement of Pavlovo-Posadsky District
- Kozlovo, Ruzsky District, Moscow Oblast, a village in Volkovskoye Rural Settlement of Ruzsky District
- Kozlovo, Sergiyevo-Posadsky District, Moscow Oblast, a village in Shemetovskoye Rural Settlement of Sergiyevo-Posadsky District
- Kozlovo, Shakhovskoy District, Moscow Oblast, a village in Stepankovskoye Rural Settlement of Shakhovskoy District
- Kozlovo, Volokolamsky District, Moscow Oblast, a village in Kashinskoye Rural Settlement of Volokolamsky District

=== Nizhny Novgorod Oblast ===
As of 2010, three rural localities in Nizhny Novgorod Oblast bear this name:

- Kozlovo, Semyonov, Nizhny Novgorod Oblast, a village in Khakhalsky Selsoviet of the town of oblast significance of Semyonov
- Kozlovo, Krasnobakovsky District, Nizhny Novgorod Oblast, a village in Zubilikhinsky Selsoviet of Krasnobakovsky District
- Kozlovo, Sokolsky District, Nizhny Novgorod Oblast, a village in Volzhsky Selsoviet of Sokolsky District

=== Novgorod Oblast ===
As of 2013, five rural localities in Novgorod Oblast bear this name:

- Kozlovo, Sushanskoye Settlement, Borovichsky District, Novgorod Oblast, a village in Sushanskoye Settlement of Borovichsky District
- Kozlovo, Travkovskoye Settlement, Borovichsky District, Novgorod Oblast, a village in Travkovskoye Settlement of Borovichsky District
- Kozlovo, Moshenskoy District, Novgorod Oblast, a village in Kirovskoye Settlement of Moshenskoy District
- Kozlovo, Novoselskoye Settlement, Starorussky District, Novgorod Oblast, a village in Novoselskoye Settlement of Starorussky District
- Kozlovo, Valdaysky District, Novgorod Oblast, a village in Ivanteyevskoye Settlement of Valdaysky District

=== Novosibirsk Oblast ===
As of 2010, one rural locality in Novosibirsk Oblast bears this name:

- Kozlovo, Novosibirsk Oblast, a village in Kochenyovsky District

=== Oryol Oblast ===
As of 2010, one rural locality in Oryol Oblast bears this name:

- Kozlovo, Oryol Oblast, a village in Gagarinsky Selsoviet of Korsakovsky District

=== Pskov Oblast ===
As of 2010, eleven rural localities in Pskov Oblast bear this name:

- Kozlovo (Yushkinskaya Rural Settlement), Gdovsky District, Pskov Oblast, a village in Gdovsky District; municipally, a part of Yushkinskaya Rural Settlement of that district
- Kozlovo (Samolvovskaya Rural Settlement), Gdovsky District, Pskov Oblast, a village in Gdovsky District; municipally, a part of Samolvovskaya Rural Settlement of that district
- Kozlovo (Ivanovskaya Rural Settlement), Nevelsky District, Pskov Oblast, a village in Nevelsky District; municipally, a part of Ivanovskaya Rural Settlement of that district
- Kozlovo (Lobkovskaya Rural Settlement), Nevelsky District, Pskov Oblast, a village in Nevelsky District; municipally, a part of Lobkovskaya Rural Settlement of that district
- Kozlovo (Lobkovskaya Rural Settlement), Nevelsky District, Pskov Oblast, a village in Nevelsky District; municipally, a part of Lobkovskaya Rural Settlement of that district
- Kozlovo, Novosokolnichesky District, Pskov Oblast, a village in Novosokolnichesky District
- Kozlovo, Opochetsky District, Pskov Oblast, a village in Opochetsky District
- Kozlovo, Plyussky District, Pskov Oblast, a village in Plyussky District
- Kozlovo, Porkhovsky District, Pskov Oblast, a village in Porkhovsky District
- Kozlovo, Sebezhsky District, Pskov Oblast, a village in Sebezhsky District
- Kozlovo, Velikoluksky District, Pskov Oblast, a village in Velikoluksky District

=== Smolensk Oblast ===
As of 2010, three rural localities in Smolensk Oblast bear this name:

- Kozlovo, Glinkovsky District, Smolensk Oblast, a village in Belokholmskoye Rural Settlement of Glinkovsky District
- Kozlovo, Kardymovsky District, Smolensk Oblast, a village in Molkovskoye Rural Settlement of Kardymovsky District
- Kozlovo, Roslavlsky District, Smolensk Oblast, a village in Khoroshovskoye Rural Settlement of Roslavlsky District

=== Tula Oblast ===
As of 2010, one rural locality in Tula Oblast bears this name:

- Kozlovo, Tula Oblast, a selo in Rakitinskaya Rural Administration of Uzlovsky District

=== Tver Oblast ===
As of 2010, nineteen inhabited localities in Tver Oblast bear this name:

Urban localities

- Kozlovo, Konakovsky District, Tver Oblast, an urban-type settlement in Konakovsky District

Rural localities

- Kozlovo, Andreapolsky District, Tver Oblast, a village in Andreapolskoye Rural Settlement of Andreapolsky District
- Kozlovo, Bezhetsky District, Tver Oblast, a village in Zhitishchenskoye Rural Settlement of Bezhetsky District
- Kozlovo, Kalininsky District, Tver Oblast, a village in Turginovskoye Rural Settlement of Kalininsky District
- Kozlovo, Kashinsky District, Tver Oblast, a village in Verkhnetroitskoye Rural Settlement of Kashinsky District
- Kozlovo, Gorodenskoye Rural Settlement, Konakovsky District, Tver Oblast, a village in Gorodenskoye Rural Settlement of Konakovsky District
- Kozlovo, Krasnokholmsky District, Tver Oblast, a village in Nivskoye Rural Settlement of Krasnokholmsky District
- Kozlovo, Likhoslavlsky District, Tver Oblast, a village in Tolmachevskoye Rural Settlement of Likhoslavlsky District
- Kozlovo, Novoselkovskoye Rural Settlement, Nelidovsky District, Tver Oblast, a village in Novoselkovskoye Rural Settlement of Nelidovsky District
- Kozlovo, Selyanskoye Rural Settlement, Nelidovsky District, Tver Oblast, a village in Selyanskoye Rural Settlement of Nelidovsky District
- Kozlovo, Selizharovsky District, Tver Oblast, a village in Bolshekoshinskoye Rural Settlement of Selizharovsky District
- Kozlovo, Kozlovskoye Rural Settlement, Spirovsky District, Tver Oblast, a selo in Kozlovskoye Rural Settlement of Spirovsky District
- Kozlovo, Penkovskoye Rural Settlement, Spirovsky District, Tver Oblast, a village in Penkovskoye Rural Settlement of Spirovsky District
- Kozlovo, Pankovo Rural Settlement, Staritsky District, Tver Oblast, a village in Pankovo Rural Settlement of Staritsky District
- Kozlovo, Stepurinskoye Rural Settlement, Staritsky District, Tver Oblast, a village in Stepurinskoye Rural Settlement of Staritsky District
- Kozlovo, Toropetsky District, Tver Oblast, a village in Ploskoshskoye Rural Settlement of Toropetsky District
- Kozlovo, Torzhoksky District, Tver Oblast, a village in Rudnikovskoye Rural Settlement of Torzhoksky District
- Kozlovo, Zharkovsky District, Tver Oblast, a village in Shchucheyskoye Rural Settlement of Zharkovsky District
- Kozlovo, Zubtsovsky District, Tver Oblast, a village in Vazuzskoye Rural Settlement of Zubtsovsky District

=== Udmurt Republic ===
As of 2010, one rural locality in the Udmurt Republic bears this name:

- Kozlovo, Udmurt Republic, a village in Podshivalovsky Selsoviet of Zavyalovsky District

=== Vladimir Oblast ===
As of 2010, one rural locality in Vladimir Oblast bears this name:

- Kozlovo, Vladimir Oblast, a village in Vyaznikovsky District

=== Vologda Oblast ===
As of 2010, fourteen rural localities in Vologda Oblast bear this name:

- Kozlovo, Bolshedvorsky Selsoviet, Cherepovetsky District, Vologda Oblast, a village in Bolshedvorsky Selsoviet of Cherepovetsky District
- Kozlovo, Dmitriyevsky Selsoviet, Cherepovetsky District, Vologda Oblast, a village in Dmitriyevsky Selsoviet of Cherepovetsky District
- Kozlovo, Pertsevsky Selsoviet, Gryazovetsky District, Vologda Oblast, a village in Pertsevsky Selsoviet of Gryazovetsky District
- Kozlovo, Ploskovsky Selsoviet, Gryazovetsky District, Vologda Oblast, a village in Ploskovsky Selsoviet of Gryazovetsky District
- Kozlovo, Kharovsky District, Vologda Oblast, a village in Shevnitsky Selsoviet of Kharovsky District
- Kozlovo, Charozersky Selsoviet, Kirillovsky District, Vologda Oblast, a village in Charozersky Selsoviet of Kirillovsky District
- Kozlovo, Kovarzinsky Selsoviet, Kirillovsky District, Vologda Oblast, a village in Kovarzinsky Selsoviet of Kirillovsky District
- Kozlovo, Pechengsky Selsoviet, Kirillovsky District, Vologda Oblast, a village in Pechengsky Selsoviet of Kirillovsky District
- Kozlovo, Nyuksensky District, Vologda Oblast, a village in Gorodishchensky Selsoviet of Nyuksensky District
- Kozlovo, Sokolsky District, Vologda Oblast, a village in Dvinitsky Selsoviet of Sokolsky District
- Kozlovo, Ustyuzhensky District, Vologda Oblast, a village in Nikiforovsky Selsoviet of Ustyuzhensky District
- Kozlovo, Velikoustyugsky District, Vologda Oblast, a village in Shemogodsky Selsoviet of Velikoustyugsky District
- Kozlovo, Lipino-Kalikinsky Selsoviet, Vozhegodsky District, Vologda Oblast, a village in Lipino-Kalikinsky Selsoviet of Vozhegodsky District
- Kozlovo, Yavengsky Selsoviet, Vozhegodsky District, Vologda Oblast, a village in Yavengsky Selsoviet of Vozhegodsky District

=== Yaroslavl Oblast ===
As of 2010, eleven rural localities in Yaroslavl Oblast bear this name:

- Kozlovo, Bolsheselsky District, Yaroslavl Oblast, a village in Vysokovsky Rural Okrug of Bolsheselsky District
- Kozlovo, Pokrovsky Rural Okrug, Borisoglebsky District, Yaroslavl Oblast, a village in Pokrovsky Rural Okrug of Borisoglebsky District
- Kozlovo, Yakovtsevsky Rural Okrug, Borisoglebsky District, Yaroslavl Oblast, a village in Yakovtsevsky Rural Okrug of Borisoglebsky District
- Kozlovo, Seredskoy Rural Okrug, Danilovsky District, Yaroslavl Oblast, a village in Seredskoy Rural Okrug of Danilovsky District
- Kozlovo, Shagotsky Rural Okrug, Danilovsky District, Yaroslavl Oblast, a village in Shagotsky Rural Okrug of Danilovsky District
- Kozlovo, Nekouzsky District, Yaroslavl Oblast, a selo in Shestikhinsky Rural Okrug of Nekouzsky District
- Kozlovo, Kholmovsky Rural Okrug, Poshekhonsky District, Yaroslavl Oblast, a village in Kholmovsky Rural Okrug of Poshekhonsky District
- Kozlovo, Sverdlovsky Rural Okrug, Poshekhonsky District, Yaroslavl Oblast, a village in Sverdlovsky Rural Okrug of Poshekhonsky District
- Kozlovo, Rostovsky District, Yaroslavl Oblast, a village in Novo-Nikolsky Rural Okrug of Rostovsky District
- Kozlovo, Tutayevsky District, Yaroslavl Oblast, a village in Pomogalovsky Rural Okrug of Tutayevsky District
- Kozlovo, Yaroslavsky District, Yaroslavl Oblast, a village in Ryutnevsky Rural Okrug of Yaroslavsky District

=== Zabaykalsky Krai ===
As of 2010, one rural locality in Zabaykalsky Krai bears this name:

- Kozlovo, Zabaykalsky Krai, a selo in Kalgansky District

== Abolished localities ==
- Kozlovo, Mednikovskoye Settlement, Starorussky District, Novgorod Oblast, a village in Mednikovskoye Settlement of Starorussky District of Novgorod Oblast; abolished in December 2012
