= Novoselki =

Novoselki or Novosyolki (Russian: Новосёлки) is the name of several rural localities in Russia.

== Bryansk Oblast ==
As of 2010, one rural locality in Bryansk Oblast bears this name:

- Novoselki, Bryansk Oblast, a selo in Novoselsky Selsoviet of Bryansky District

== Ivanovo Oblast ==
As of 2010, three rural localities in Ivanovo Oblast bear this name:

- Novoselki, Komsomolsky District, Ivanovo Oblast, a selo in Komsomolsky District
- Novoselki, Palekhsky District, Ivanovo Oblast, a village in Palekhsky District
- Novoselki, Yuryevetsky District, Ivanovo Oblast, a village in Yuryevetsky District

== Kaliningrad Oblast ==
As of 2010, two rural localities in Kaliningrad Oblast bear this name:

- Novoselki, Bagrationovsky District, Kaliningrad Oblast, a settlement in Gvardeysky Rural Okrug of Bagrationovsky District
- Novoselki, Pravdinsky District, Kaliningrad Oblast, a settlement under the administrative jurisdiction of the urban-type settlement of district significance of Zheleznodorozhny, Pravdinsky District

== Kaluga Oblast ==
As of 2010, fifteen rural localities in Kaluga Oblast bear this name:

- Novoselki, Kaluga, Kaluga Oblast, a village under the administrative jurisdiction of the City of Kaluga
- Novoselki, Baryatinsky District, Kaluga Oblast, a village in Baryatinsky District
- Novoselki, Ferzikovsky District, Kaluga Oblast, a village in Ferzikovsky District
- Novoselki, Khvastovichsky District, Kaluga Oblast, a village in Khvastovichsky District
- Novoselki, Kirovsky District, Kaluga Oblast, a village in Kirovsky District
- Novoselki (Popelevo Rural Settlement), Kozelsky District, Kaluga Oblast, a village in Kozelsky District; municipally, a part of Popelevo Rural Settlement of that district
- Novoselki (Lavrovsk Rural Settlement), Kozelsky District, Kaluga Oblast, a village in Kozelsky District; municipally, a part of Lavrovsk Rural Settlement of that district
- Novoselki, Maloyaroslavetsky District, Kaluga Oblast, a village in Maloyaroslavetsky District
- Novoselki, Medynsky District, Kaluga Oblast, a village in Medynsky District
- Novoselki (selo), Meshchovsky District, Kaluga Oblast, a selo in Meshchovsky District
- Novoselki (village), Meshchovsky District, Kaluga Oblast, a village in Meshchovsky District
- Novoselki, Mosalsky District, Kaluga Oblast, a village in Mosalsky District
- Novoselki (Silkovo Rural Settlement), Peremyshlsky District, Kaluga Oblast, a village in Peremyshlsky District; municipally, a part of Silkovo Rural Settlement of that district
- Novoselki (Makarovo Rural Settlement), Peremyshlsky District, Kaluga Oblast, a village in Peremyshlsky District; municipally, a part of Makarovo Rural Settlement of that district
- Novoselki, Zhukovsky District, Kaluga Oblast, a village in Zhukovsky District

== Kostroma Oblast ==
As of 2010, seven rural localities in Kostroma Oblast bear this name:

- Novoselki, Buysky District, Kostroma Oblast, two villages in Tsentralnoye Settlement of Buysky District
- Novoselki, Kadyysky District, Kostroma Oblast, a khutor in Yekaterinkinskoye Settlement of Kadyysky District
- Novoselki, Kologrivsky District, Kostroma Oblast, a village in Ilyinskoye Settlement of Kologrivsky District
- Novoselki, Makaryevsky District, Kostroma Oblast, a village in Krasnogorskoye Settlement of Makaryevsky District
- Novoselki, Ostrovsky District, Kostroma Oblast, a village in Klevantsovskoye Settlement of Ostrovsky District
- Novoselki, Susaninsky District, Kostroma Oblast, a village in Chentsovskoye Settlement of Susaninsky District

== Kursk Oblast ==
As of 2010, one rural locality in Kursk Oblast bears this name:

- Novoselki, Kursk Oblast, a village in Yasenetsky Selsoviet of Fatezhsky District

== Leningrad Oblast ==
As of 2010, two rural localities in Leningrad Oblast bear this name:

- Novoselki, Kingiseppsky District, Leningrad Oblast, a village in Opolyevskoye Settlement Municipal Formation of Kingiseppsky District
- Novoselki, Lomonosovsky District, Leningrad Oblast, a village in Koporskoye Settlement Municipal Formation of Lomonosovsky District

== Lipetsk Oblast ==
As of 2010, three rural localities in Lipetsk Oblast bear this name:

- Novoselki, Lukyanovsky Selsoviet, Stanovlyansky District, Lipetsk Oblast, a village in Lukyanovsky Selsoviet of Stanovlyansky District
- Novoselki, Ostrovsky Selsoviet, Stanovlyansky District, Lipetsk Oblast, a village in Ostrovsky Selsoviet of Stanovlyansky District
- Novoselki, Volovsky District, Lipetsk Oblast, a village in Ozhoginsky Selsoviet of Volovsky District

== Republic of Mordovia ==
As of 2010, one rural locality in the Republic of Mordovia bears this name:

- Novoselki, Republic of Mordovia, a selo in Michurinsky Selsoviet of Chamzinsky District

== Moscow Oblast ==
As of 2010, twenty rural localities in Moscow Oblast bear this name:

- Novoselki, Chekhovsky District, Moscow Oblast, a selo in Barantsevskoye Rural Settlement of Chekhovsky District
- Novoselki, Dmitrovsky District, Moscow Oblast, a village in Sinkovskoye Rural Settlement of Dmitrovsky District
- Novoselki, Kashirsky District, Moscow Oblast, a settlement in Znamenskoye Rural Settlement of Kashirsky District
- Novoselki, Klinsky District, Moscow Oblast, a village in Vozdvizhenskoye Rural Settlement of Klinsky District
- Novoselki, Biorkovskoye Rural Settlement, Kolomensky District, Moscow Oblast, a village in Biorkovskoye Rural Settlement of Kolomensky District
- Novoselki, Khoroshovskoye Rural Settlement, Kolomensky District, Moscow Oblast, a village in Khoroshovskoye Rural Settlement of Kolomensky District
- Novoselki, Mozhaysky District, Moscow Oblast, a village in Klementyevskoye Rural Settlement of Mozhaysky District
- Novoselki, Naro-Fominsky District, Moscow Oblast, a village in Ateptsevskoye Rural Settlement of Naro-Fominsky District
- Novoselki, Podolsky District, Moscow Oblast, a village in Lagovskoye Rural Settlement of Podolsky District
- Novoselki, Serebryano-Prudsky District, Moscow Oblast, a village in Uzunovskoye Rural Settlement of Serebryano-Prudsky District
- Novoselki, Lozovskoye Rural Settlement, Sergiyevo-Posadsky District, Moscow Oblast, a village in Lozovskoye Rural Settlement of Sergiyevo-Posadsky District
- Novoselki, Selkovskoye Rural Settlement, Sergiyevo-Posadsky District, Moscow Oblast, a village in Selkovskoye Rural Settlement of Sergiyevo-Posadsky District
- Novoselki, Shemetovskoye Rural Settlement, Sergiyevo-Posadsky District, Moscow Oblast, a village in Shemetovskoye Rural Settlement of Sergiyevo-Posadsky District
- Novoselki, Khotkovo, Sergiyevo-Posadsky District, Moscow Oblast, a village under the administrative jurisdiction of the Town of Khotkovo in Sergiyevo-Posadsky District
- Novoselki, Dashkovskoye Rural Settlement, Serpukhovsky District, Moscow Oblast, a village in Dashkovskoye Rural Settlement of Serpukhovsky District
- Novoselki, Lipitskoye Rural Settlement, Serpukhovsky District, Moscow Oblast, a village in Lipitskoye Rural Settlement of Serpukhovsky District
- Novoselki, Aksinyinskoye Rural Settlement, Stupinsky District, Moscow Oblast, a village in Aksinyinskoye Rural Settlement of Stupinsky District
- Novoselki, Leontyevskoye Rural Settlement, Stupinsky District, Moscow Oblast, a village in Leontyevskoye Rural Settlement of Stupinsky District
- Novoselki, Zhilyovo, Stupinsky District, Moscow Oblast, a village under the administrative jurisdiction of the work settlement of Zhilyovo in Stupinsky District
- Novoselki, Zaraysky District, Moscow Oblast, a village in Gololobovskoye Rural Settlement of Zaraysky District

== Nizhny Novgorod Oblast ==
As of 2010, six rural localities in Nizhny Novgorod Oblast bear this name:

- Novoselki, Arzamassky District, Nizhny Novgorod Oblast, a selo in Bebyayevsky Selsoviet of Arzamassky District
- Novoselki, Lukoyanovsky District, Nizhny Novgorod Oblast, a selo in Bolshearsky Selsoviet of Lukoyanovsky District
- Novoselki, Sechenovsky District, Nizhny Novgorod Oblast, a village in Vasilyevsky Selsoviet of Sechenovsky District
- Novoselki, Vachsky District, Nizhny Novgorod Oblast, a selo in Novoselsky Selsoviet of Vachsky District
- Novoselki, Vadsky District, Nizhny Novgorod Oblast, a village in Kruto-Maydansky Selsoviet of Vadsky District
- Novoselki, Voznesensky District, Nizhny Novgorod Oblast, a selo in Butakovsky Selsoviet of Voznesensky District

== Novgorod Oblast ==
As of 2010, two rural localities in Novgorod Oblast bear this name:

- Novoselki, Kholmsky District, Novgorod Oblast, a village in Morkhovskoye Settlement of Kholmsky District
- Novoselki, Pestovsky District, Novgorod Oblast, a village in Pestovskoye Settlement of Pestovsky District

== Orenburg Oblast ==
As of 2010, one rural locality in Orenburg Oblast bears this name:

- Novoselki, Orenburg Oblast, a selo in Vasilyevsky Selsoviet of Saraktashsky District

== Oryol Oblast ==
As of 2010, six rural localities in Oryol Oblast bear this name:

- Novoselki, Dmitrovsky District, Oryol Oblast, a settlement in Berezovsky Selsoviet of Dmitrovsky District
- Novoselki, Kolpnyansky District, Oryol Oblast, a village in Belokolodezsky Selsoviet of Kolpnyansky District
- Novoselki, Alyabyevsky Selsoviet, Mtsensky District, Oryol Oblast, a village in Alyabyevsky Selsoviet of Mtsensky District
- Novoselki, Chakhinsky Selsoviet, Mtsensky District, Oryol Oblast, a village in Chakhinsky Selsoviet of Mtsensky District
- Novoselki, Shablykinsky District, Oryol Oblast, a village in Kosulichesky Selsoviet of Shablykinsky District
- Novoselki, Soskovsky District, Oryol Oblast, a settlement in Ryzhkovsky Selsoviet of Soskovsky District

== Pskov Oblast ==
As of 2010, two rural localities in Pskov Oblast bear this name:

- Novoselki, Novosokolnichesky District, Pskov Oblast, a village in Novosokolnichesky District
- Novoselki, Velikoluksky District, Pskov Oblast, a village in Velikoluksky District

== Ryazan Oblast ==
As of 2010, six rural localities in Ryazan Oblast bear this name:

- Novoselki, Kadomsky District, Ryazan Oblast, a selo in Novoselsky Rural Okrug of Kadomsky District
- Novoselki, Klepikovsky District, Ryazan Oblast, a village in Aristovsky Rural Okrug of Klepikovsky District
- Novoselki, Ryazansky District, Ryazan Oblast, a settlement in Novoselkovsky Rural Okrug of Ryazansky District
- Novoselki, Rybnovsky District, Ryazan Oblast, a selo in Novoselsky Rural Okrug of Rybnovsky District
- Novoselki, Shatsky District, Ryazan Oblast, a selo in Kuplinsky Rural Okrug of Shatsky District
- Novoselki, Starozhilovsky District, Ryazan Oblast, a village under the administrative jurisdiction of the work settlement of Starozhilovo in Starozhilovsky District

== Samara Oblast ==
As of 2010, one rural locality in Samara Oblast bears this name:

- Novoselki, Samara Oblast, a village in Syzransky District

== Smolensk Oblast ==
As of 2010, ten rural localities in Smolensk Oblast bear this name:

- Novoselki, Dukhovshchinsky District, Smolensk Oblast, a village in Babinskoye Rural Settlement of Dukhovshchinsky District
- Novoselki, Krasninsky District, Smolensk Oblast, a village in Mankovskoye Rural Settlement of Krasninsky District
- Novoselki, Gryazenyatskoye Rural Settlement, Roslavlsky District, Smolensk Oblast, a village in Gryazenyatskoye Rural Settlement of Roslavlsky District
- Novoselki, Syrokorenskoye Rural Settlement, Roslavlsky District, Smolensk Oblast, a village in Syrokorenskoye Rural Settlement of Roslavlsky District
- Novoselki, Rudnyansky District, Smolensk Oblast, a village in Klyarinovskoye Rural Settlement of Rudnyansky District
- Novoselki, Smetaninskoye Rural Settlement, Smolensky District, Smolensk Oblast, a village in Smetaninskoye Rural Settlement of Smolensky District
- Novoselki, Stabenskoye Rural Settlement, Smolensky District, Smolensk Oblast, a village in Stabenskoye Rural Settlement of Smolensky District
- Novoselki, Kalpitskoye Rural Settlement, Vyazemsky District, Smolensk Oblast, a village in Kalpitskoye Rural Settlement of Vyazemsky District
- Novoselki, Polyanovskoye Rural Settlement, Vyazemsky District, Smolensk Oblast, a village in Polyanovskoye Rural Settlement of Vyazemsky District
- Novoselki, Yartsevsky District, Smolensk Oblast, a village in Lvovskoye Rural Settlement of Yartsevsky District

== Tambov Oblast ==
As of 2010, two rural localities in Tambov Oblast bear this name:

- Novoselki, Michurinsky District, Tambov Oblast, a village in Starokazinsky Selsoviet of Michurinsky District
- Novoselki, Nikiforovsky District, Tambov Oblast, a village in Yurlovsky Selsoviet of Nikiforovsky District

== Republic of Tatarstan ==
As of 2010, one rural locality in the Republic of Tatarstan bears this name:

- Novoselki, Republic of Tatarstan, a selo in Buinsky District

== Tula Oblast ==
As of 2010, eleven rural localities in Tula Oblast bear this name:

- Novoselki, Aleksinsky District, Tula Oblast, a village in Aleksandrovsky Rural Okrug of Aleksinsky District
- Novoselki, Chernsky District, Tula Oblast, a village in Yerzhinskaya Rural Administration of Chernsky District
- Novoselki, Kamensky District, Tula Oblast, a village in Galitsky Rural Okrug of Kamensky District
- Novoselki, Kimovsky District, Tula Oblast, a village in Pronsky Rural Okrug of Kimovsky District
- Novoselki, Leninsky District, Tula Oblast, a village in Bezhkovsky Rural Okrug of Leninsky District
- Novoselki, Plavsky District, Tula Oblast, a settlement in Kamyninsky Rural Okrug of Plavsky District
- Novoselki, Shchyokinsky District, Tula Oblast, a village in Kostomarovskaya Rural Administration of Shchyokinsky District
- Novoselki, Tyoplo-Ogaryovsky District, Tula Oblast, a village in Naryshkinsky Rural Okrug of Tyoplo-Ogaryovsky District
- Novoselki, Venyovsky District, Tula Oblast, a village in Anishinsky Rural Okrug of Venyovsky District
- Novoselki, Yasnogorsky District, Tula Oblast, a settlement in Znamenskaya Rural Territory of Yasnogorsky District
- Novoselki, Zaoksky District, Tula Oblast, a village in Malakhovsky Rural Okrug of Zaoksky District

== Tver Oblast ==
As of 2010, six rural localities in Tver Oblast bear this name:

- Novoselki, Andreapolsky District, Tver Oblast, a village in Andreapolsky District
- Novoselki, Nelidovsky District, Tver Oblast, a village in Nelidovsky District
- Novoselki, Oleninsky District, Tver Oblast, a village in Oleninsky District
- Novoselki, Selizharovsky District, Tver Oblast, a village in Selizharovsky District
- Novoselki, Zapadnodvinsky District, Tver Oblast, a village in Zapadnodvinsky District
- Novoselki, Zharkovsky District, Tver Oblast, a settlement in Zharkovsky District

== Tyumen Oblast ==
As of 2010, one rural locality in Tyumen Oblast bears this name:

- Novoselki, Tyumen Oblast, a village in Beskozobovsky Rural Okrug of Golyshmanovsky District

== Ulyanovsk Oblast ==
As of 2010, one rural locality in Ulyanovsk Oblast bears this name:

- Novoselki, Ulyanovsk Oblast, a settlement in Novoselkinsky Rural Okrug of Melekessky District

== Vladimir Oblast ==
As of 2010, one rural locality in Vladimir Oblast bears this name:

- Novoselki, Vladimir Oblast, a village in Muromsky District

== Vologda Oblast ==
As of 2010, one rural locality in Vologda Oblast bears this name:

- Novoselki, Vologda Oblast, a village in Lyubomirovsky Selsoviet of Sheksninsky District

== Voronezh Oblast ==
As of 2010, one rural locality in Voronezh Oblast bears this name:

- Novoselki, Voronezh Oblast, a settlement in Khlebenskoye Rural Settlement of Novousmansky District

== Yaroslavl Oblast ==
As of 2010, twelve rural localities in Yaroslavl Oblast bear this name:

- Novoselki, Bolsheselsky District, Yaroslavl Oblast, a village in Markovsky Rural Okrug of Bolsheselsky District
- Novoselki, Danilovsky District, Yaroslavl Oblast, a village in Ryzhikovsky Rural Okrug of Danilovsky District
- Novoselki, Gavrilov-Yamsky District, Yaroslavl Oblast, a village in Mitinsky Rural Okrug of Gavrilov-Yamsky District
- Novoselki, Lyubimsky District, Yaroslavl Oblast, a village in Voskresensky Rural Okrug of Lyubimsky District
- Novoselki, Myshkinsky District, Yaroslavl Oblast, a village in Arkhangelsky Rural Okrug of Myshkinsky District
- Novoselki, Nekouzsky District, Yaroslavl Oblast, a village in Shestikhinsky Rural Okrug of Nekouzsky District
- Novoselki, Nekrasovsky District, Yaroslavl Oblast, a village in Yakushevsky Rural Okrug of Nekrasovsky District
- Novoselki, Rybinsky District, Yaroslavl Oblast, a village in Oktyabrsky Rural Okrug of Rybinsky District
- Novoselki, Tutayevsky District, Yaroslavl Oblast, a village in Artemyevsky Rural Okrug of Tutayevsky District
- Novoselki, Uglichsky District, Yaroslavl Oblast, a village in Maymersky Rural Okrug of Uglichsky District
- Novoselki, Lyutovsky Rural Okrug, Yaroslavsky District, Yaroslavl Oblast, a village in Lyutovsky Rural Okrug of Yaroslavsky District
- Novoselki, Mordvinovsky Rural Okrug, Yaroslavsky District, Yaroslavl Oblast, a village in Mordvinovsky Rural Okrug of Yaroslavsky District
