= Fast Train (film) =

1988 russian film directed by Boris Yashin

- Written by: Elena Laskareva
- Directed by: Boris Yashin
- Starring: Elena Mayorova
- Country of origin: Soviet Union
- Original language: Russian

Production
- Producer: Galina Sokolova
- Cinematography: Vladimir Papyan
- Editor: Olga Etenko
- Running time: 99 min.
- Production company: Mosfilm

Original release
- Release: November 1988

Fast Train (Russian: Скорый поезд, romanized: Skoryy poezd) is a 1988 Soviet television film directed by Boris Yashin and based on a screenplay by Elena Laskareva.

== Plot ==
Dining car waitress Olga Koreneva arrives in the village of Ferzikovo, home to her mother, Ksenia, and her son, Anton (nicknamed Spine). Ksenia's neighbors trust Olga. Ksenia inherited a small apartment from Baba Vali, who has recently died. Anton has constantly been at boarding school. Because of the son, fights constantly occur between Olga and Ksenia. To be with her beloved, Olga decides to take her son away from her mother.

== Cast ==
- Elena Mayorova as Olga Koreneva
- Zhenya Pivovarov as Anton (Spine), Olga's son
- Lyudmila Zaytseva as Vera Vasilyevna
- Lidia Savchenko as Ksenia, Olga's mother
- Galina Stakhanova as Alla
- Alexander Safronov as Rybakov
- Alexander Boukleev as Pavel, director of the dining car

== Shooting ==
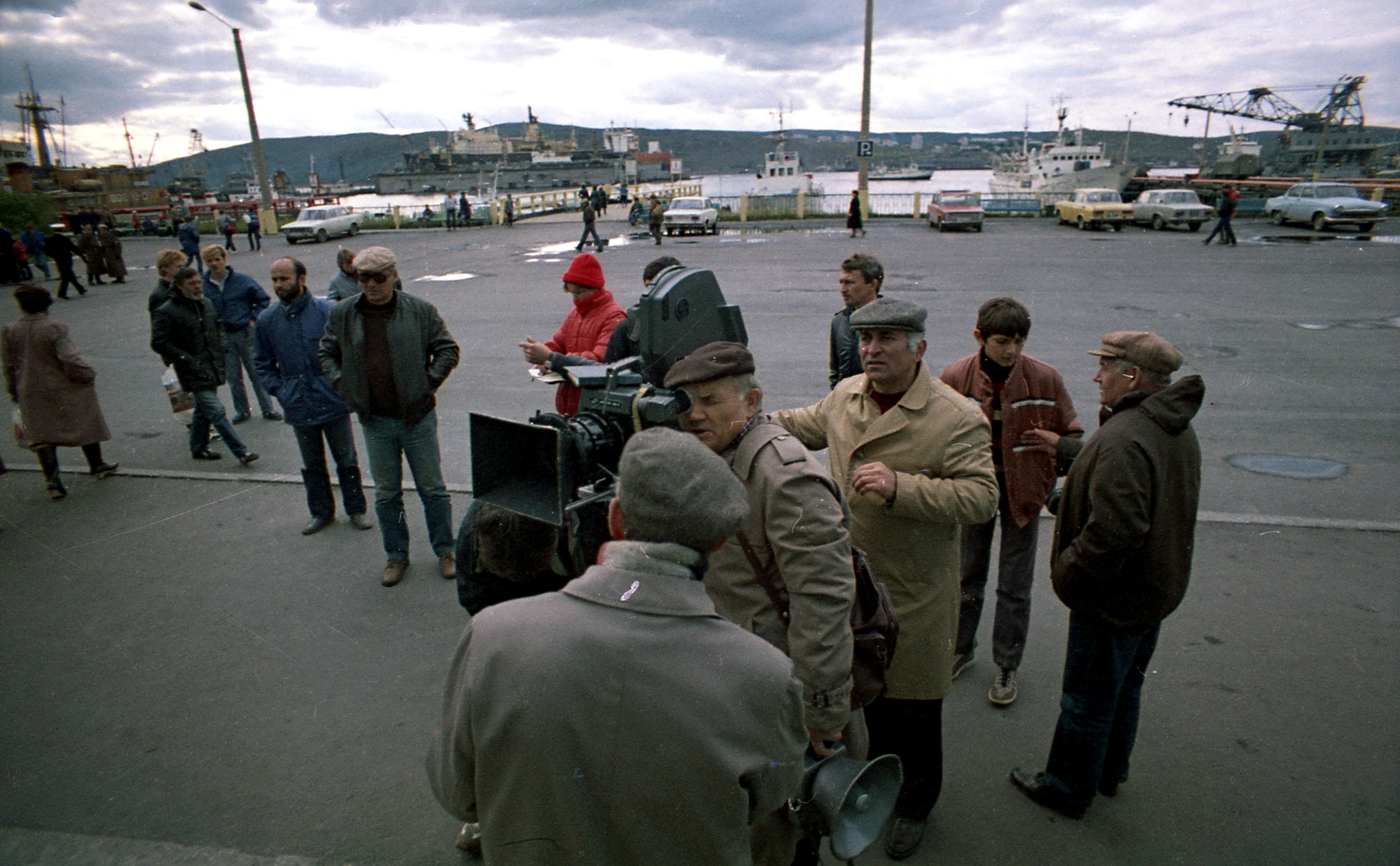
Boris Yashin and Vladimir Papyan on set

Part of the filming took place in the village of Ferzikovo. The film includes shots of Ferzikovo railway station and footage of the boarding school, where the son of the main character Olga studies. The filming took place in the existing boarding school, which was located on the estate of Alexander Nikolayevich Chirikov. Several scenes were shot in Murmansk: the film includes footage shot on the coastal road from Kola Bay, at Murmansk railway station and the Marine Station.

== Award ==
- The Prize for Best Actress at the Constellation Film Festival (Elena Mayorova)

== Reception ==
Soviet film critic Elga Lyndina considered the role of Olga, the train conductor, to be one of the best roles played by actress Elena Mayorova:

In "Fast Train", Mayorova brought together many of the themes she had previously explored. She focused on the plight of women, homelessness, and emotional turmoil. She also explored the hidden dream of a different life, where no one would dare to insult or humiliate her. She longed for the presence of a man who would bring her comfort and alleviate her suffering. Mayorova led the audience through the back alleys of the lost soul of the conductor Olga and through the back alleys of our souls, screaming in pain, grasping at straws. And believing, still believing, even though the straws broke and people sank into the abyss.
