= Dugna =

Dugna Дугна
- Settlement
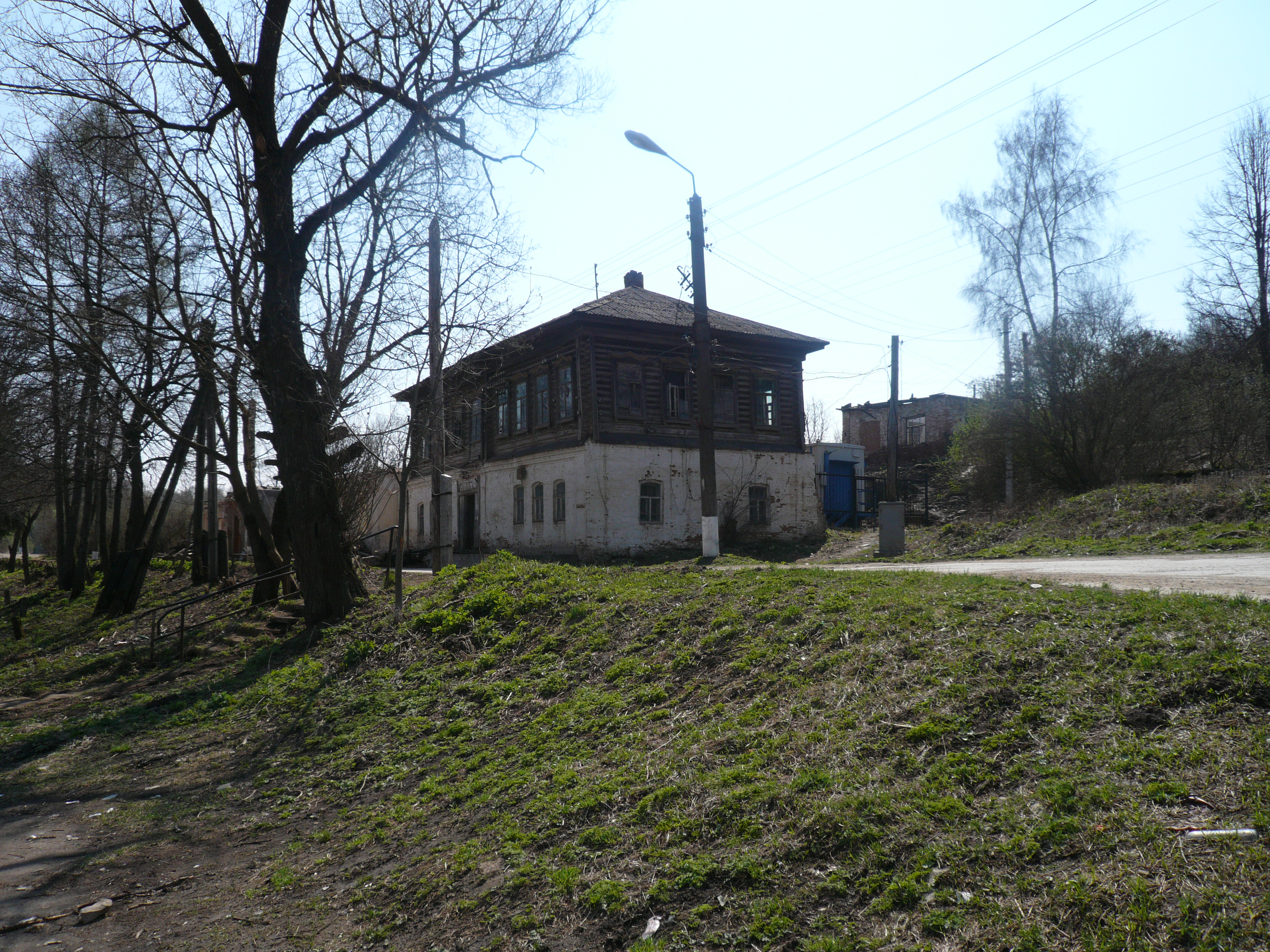
- Center of the settlement, the view on former Demidov's houses used as a school and a library during Soviet times
- Interactive map of Dugna
- Location of Dugna Dugna (European Russia) Dugna (Russia)
- Coordinates: 54°24′N 36°51′E
- Country: Russia
- Federal subject: Kaluga Oblast
- Administrative district: Ferzikovsky District
- Founded: 1709

Population (2010 Census)
  - Total: 667
  - Estimate (2012): 663 (−0.6%)

Municipal status
  - Municipal district: Ferzikovsky Municipal District
  - Urban settlement: Dugna Urban Settlement
  - Capital of: Dugna Urban Settlement
- Time zone: UTC+3 (MSK)
- Postal code: 249811
- Dialing code: +7 484
- OKTMO ID: 29644403101

Dugna (Russian: Дугна́) is an urban locality (a settlement) in Ferzikovsky District of Kaluga Oblast, Russia, located on the left bank of the Dugna River, 18 kilometers (11 mi) from Ferzikovo, on the main rail line between Kaluga and Tula. Population: 667 (2010 census); 792 (2002 census); 946 (1989 Soviet census).

== History ==
The Dugna Foundry was first mentioned in 1689. The settlement itself was founded in 1709 by Nikita Demidov, who built the first steel mills in Russia. The steel mills were built in 1715 on the site of L. Naryshkin Iron Works, founded in 1690. Now the ironworks are known as Dugna Machine Plant

Having arrived to the region in 1700, Nikita Demidov was well aware of its riches and of the importance of the steel industry for the economy of Russia. With the personal guarantee of Peter the Great, he was one of the pioneers to develop Russian domestic metallurgy and metal production. In the mid-18th century, Dugna, Brynsky, and Vyrovsky plants annually produced 19,000 poods of iron for the local market and additionally exported large quantities to St. Petersburg. Production of iron at these three factories at that time ranged from 40 to 70 thousand poods a year, which corresponded to melting of approximately 60-100 thousand poods of iron.

Dugna was granted urban-type settlement status in 1925.

== Demographics ==
Distribution of the population by ethnicity according to the 2021 census:

	percent
Russians	74.70%
Romani	18.60%
Armenians	3.27%
Ukrainians	0.89%
Dargins	0.74%

== Places of interest ==
- Peter & Paul Church (built about 1764)
- Pontoon bridge over the Oka River
- Steel pedestrian bridge over the Dugna River

== Gallery ==
Mechanical factory and a church

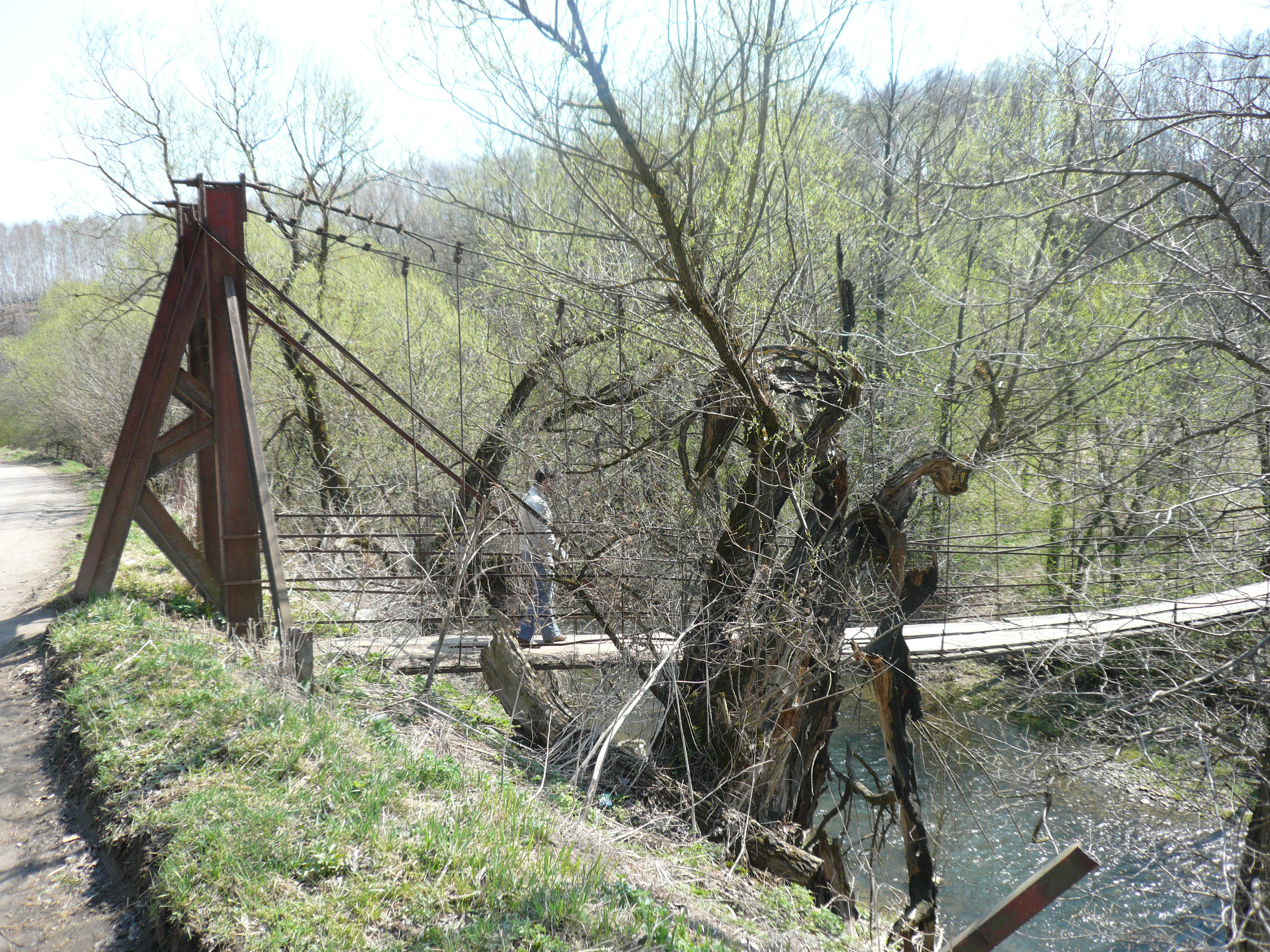
Pedestrian bridge over the Dugna River
