= Avdeyevka, Russia =

Rural locality in Kaluga Oblast, Russia

Avdeyevka Авдеевка
- Village
- Location within Kaluga Oblast Location within Russia
- Coordinates: 53°25′N 34°44′E
- Country: Russia
- Region: Kaluga Oblast
- District: Khvastovichsky District
- Time zone: UTC+3:00

Avdeyevka (Russian: Авдеевка) is a rural locality (a village) and the administrative center of Derevnya Avdeyevka Rural Settlement of Khvastovichsky District, Kaluga Oblast, Russia. The population was 116 as of 2010. There are 4 streets.

== Geography ==
Avdeyevka is located 27 km southwest of Khvastovichi (the district's administrative centre) by road. Guda is the nearest rural locality.
