= Aleh Veratsila =

Belarusian footballer

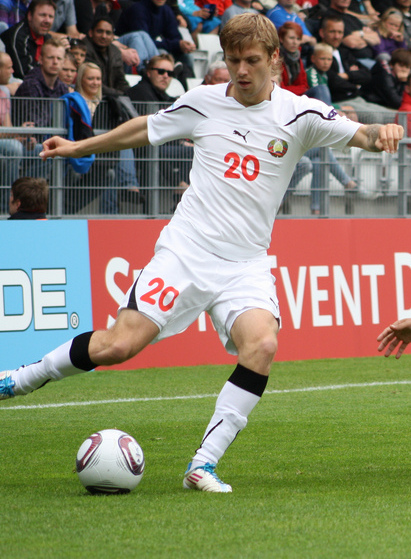

Personal information
- Date of birth: 10 July 1988 (age 38)
- Place of birth: Novoselki, Grodno Oblast, Belarusian SSR
- Height: 1.80 m (5 ft 11 in)
- Position: Defender

Youth career
- 2005–2006: Dinamo Minsk

Senior career*
Years	Team	Apps	(Gls)
2007–2015	Dinamo Minsk	231	(5)
2016	Podbeskidzie Bielsko-Biała	10	(0)
2016–2017	Minsk	28	(1)
2017–2020	Dinamo Brest	87	(0)
2021	Liepāja	13	(0)
2022	Vitebsk	23	(1)
2023–2026	Isloch Minsk Raion	75	(0)

International career
2004–2005	Belarus U17	7	(0)
2005–2006	Belarus U19	8	(0)
2008–2011	Belarus U21	29	(1)
2011–2012	Belarus Olympic	6	(0)
2011–2019	Belarus	20	(0)
- * Club domestic league appearances and goals as of 2 August 2026

Aleh Uladzimiravich Veratsila (Belarusian: Алег Вераціла; Russian: Олег Веретило; sometimes transliterated Oleg Veretilo, born 10 July 1988) is a Belarusian former professional footballer who played as a defender.

== Career ==
On 12 October 2010, Veratsila scored the winning third goal in extra time against Italy U21 to help the Belarus U21 team qualify for the 2011 UEFA European Under-21 Football Championship.

On 7 October 2011, Veratsila made his debut for the senior side of his country after coming on as a last-minute substitute in UEFA Euro 2012 qualifier against Romania.

He was part of the Belarus Olympic side that participated in the 2012 Toulon Tournament.

== Honours ==
Dinamo Brest

- Belarusian Premier League: 2019
- Belarusian Cup: 2017–18
- Belarusian Super Cup: 2018, 2019, 2020
