= Fast Train =

Fast train may refer to:

- High-speed rail, operated in countries such as France and Japan
- Express train, a train making a limited number of stops
- Semi-high speed rail, train with lower priority and more stops than the express train, but with higher priority and fewer stations than the local train

== Arts and entertainment ==
- Fast Train (film), a 1988 Soviet television film
- "Fast Train" (song), a 1971 single by Canadian rock band April Wine
- "Fast Train", a song by Van Morrison from his 2002 album Down the Road
  - Covered by Solomon Burke on the 2002 album Don't Give Up on Me
- "Fast Train", a song by James Blundell from the 1993 album Touch of Water

== See also ==
- Express train (disambiguation)
- Very Fast Train, Australia
- Fast transport, WWII US Navy warship classification
