= Novospassky Monastery =

Russian Orthodox monastery in Moscow, Russia

Coordinates: 55°43′55″N 37°39′24″E

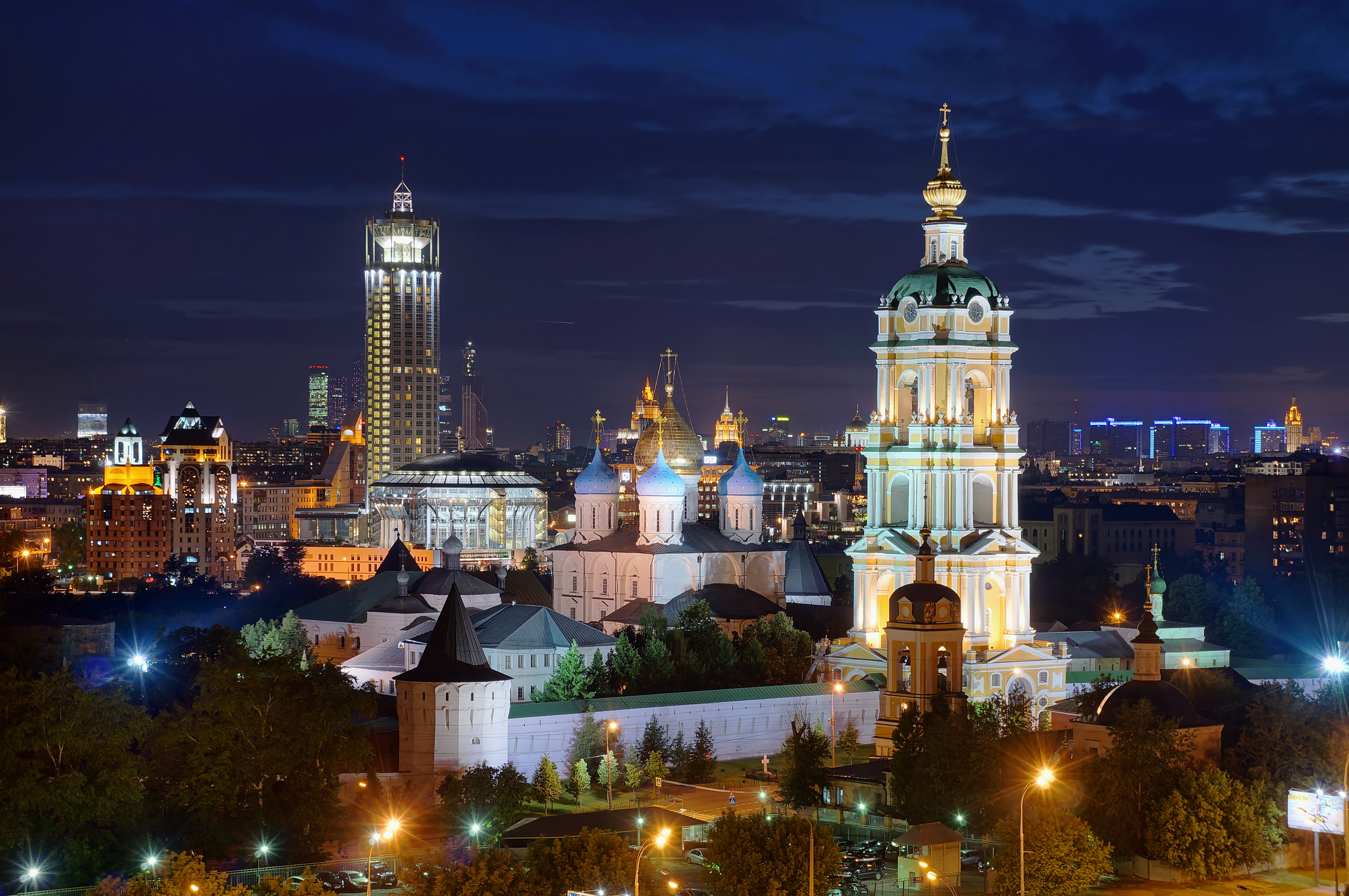
The New Monastery of the Saviour in 2012

Novospassky Monastery (New Monastery of the Savior, Russian: Новоспасский монастырь, romanized: Novospasskiy monastyr') is one of the fortified monasteries surrounding Moscow from the south-east. Like all medieval Russian monasteries, it was built by the Russian Orthodox Church.

The abbey traces its history back to Moscow's first monastery established in the early 14th century at the location where the Danilov Monastery now stands. The Church of the Savior in the Wood (Собор Спаса на Бору) of the Kremlin, the oldest church of Moscow, was its original katholikon. Upon its removal to the left bank of the Moskva River in 1491, the abbey was renamed New Abbey of the Savior, to distinguish it from the older one in the Kremlin.

The monastery was patronized by Andrei Kobyla's descendants, including the Sheremetev and Romanov boyars, and served as their burial vault. Among the last Romanovs buried in the monastery were Xenia Shestova (the mother of the first Romanov Tsar), Princess Tarakanova (a pretender who claimed to have been the only daughter of Empress Elisabeth) and Grand Duke Sergei Alexandrovich of Russia.

In 1571 and 1591, the wooden citadel withstood repeated attacks by Crimean Tatars.

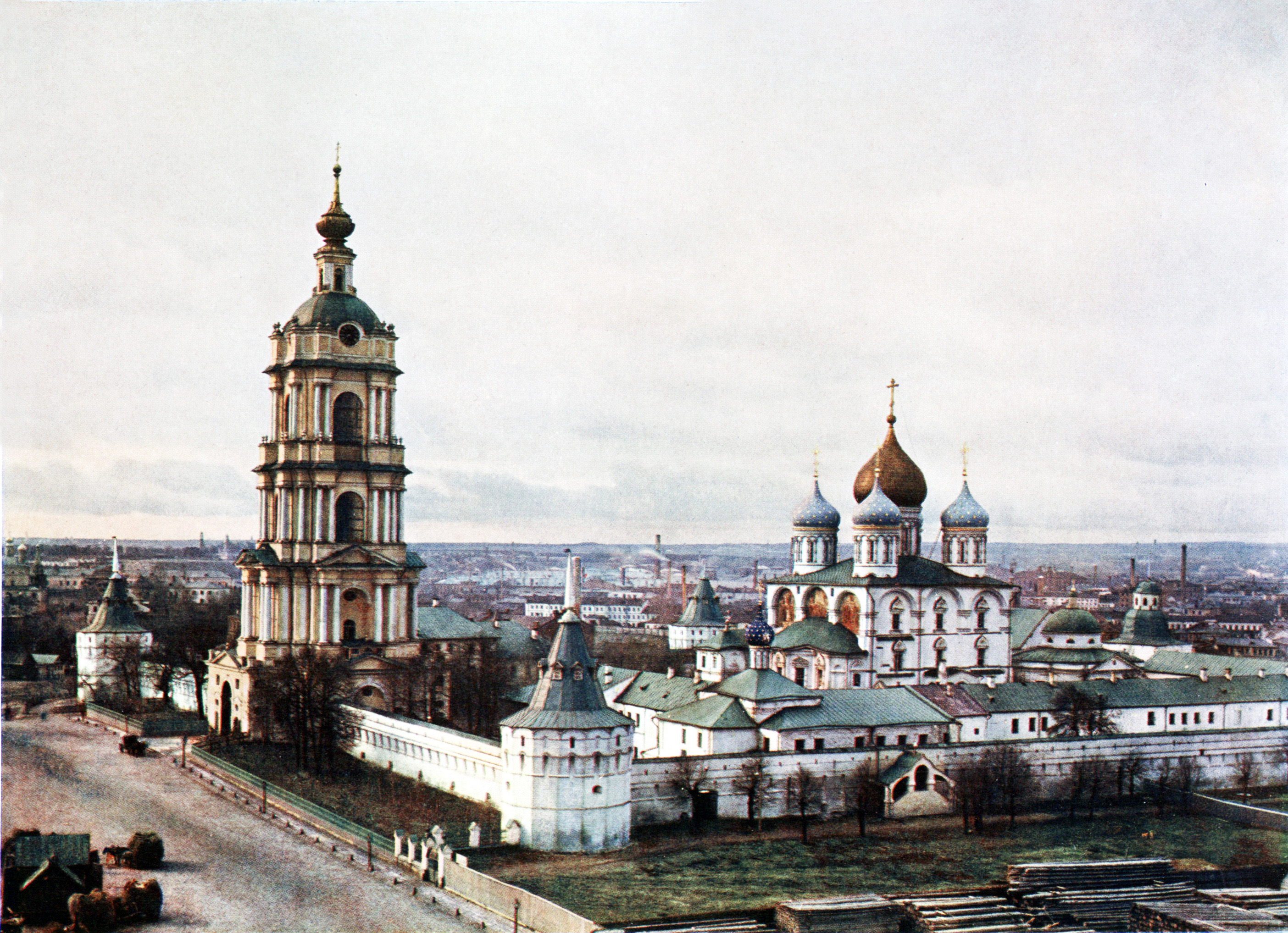
The New Monastery of the Saviour in 1910

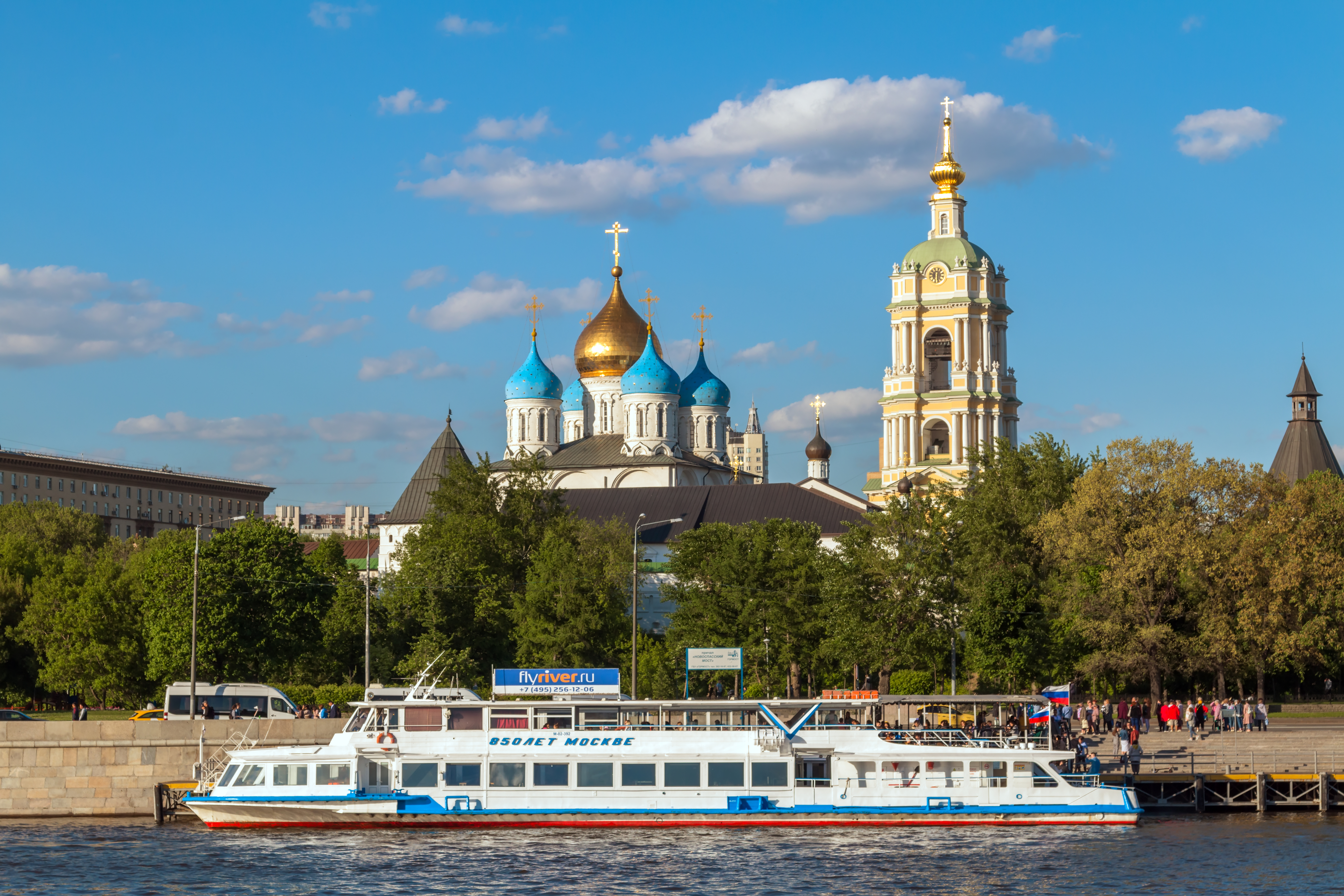
As seen from the quay of the Moskva River

Upon the Romanovs' ascension to the Moscovy throne, Michael of Russia completely rebuilt their family shrine in the 1640s. Apart from the large 18th-century bell-tower (one of the tallest in Moscow) and the Sheremetev sepulcher in the Church of the Sign, all other buildings date from that period. They include:

- The Cathedral of the Transfiguration (Russian: Преображенский собор) (1645–49), a large five-domed katholikon with frescoes by the finest Muscovite painters of the 17th century
- The Intercession Church (Russian: Покровская церковь) or Church of the Veil of the Virgin (1673–1675) with a refectory
- The Church of the Sign or Church of the Znamenie Icon of the Virgin (1791–1795)
- The bell tower (1759–1785)
- The infirmary Church of St. Nicholas the Miracle Worker and monks' living quarters
- The house of Patriarch Filaret
- The House of Loaf-Giving.

During the Soviet years, the monastery was converted into a prison, then into a police drunk tank. In the 1970s, it was assigned to an art restoration institute, and finally returned to the Russian Orthodox Church in 1991.

== See also ==
- Durakovo
