= Express train (disambiguation) =

Express train may refer to:

- Express train, a train making a limited number of stops
  - Express trains in India
- Express Train, a model for the peopling of Polynesia by Austronesian peoples

== See also ==
- Fast Train (disambiguation)
