= Kuybyshevsky District, Kaluga Oblast =

Kuybyshevsky District Куйбышевский район
- District
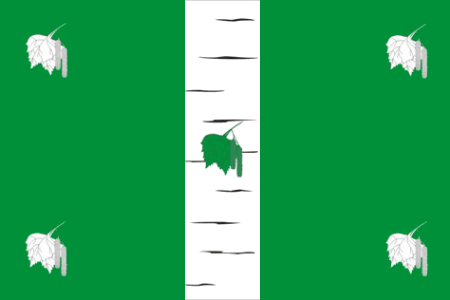
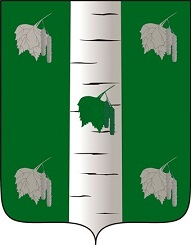
- Flag Coat of arms
- Location of Kuybyshevsky District in Kaluga Oblast
- Coordinates: 54°00′59″N 33°56′59″E
- Country: Russia
- Federal subject: Kaluga Oblast
- Established: 1 October 1929
- Administrative center: Betlitsa

Area
  - Total: 1,243 km^{2} (480 sq mi)

Population (2010 Census)
  - Total: 7,831
  - Density: 6.300/km^{2} (16.32/sq mi)
  - Urban: 0%
  - Rural: 100%

Administrative structure
  - Inhabited localities: 134 rural localities

Municipal structure
  - Municipally incorporated as: Kuybyshevsky Municipal District
  - Municipal divisions: 0 urban settlements, 5 rural settlements
- Time zone: UTC+3 (MSK)
- OKTMO ID: 29618000
- Website: http://betlica.ru/

Kuybyshevsky District (Russian: Ку́йбышевский райо́н) is an administrative and municipal district (raion), one of the twenty-four in Kaluga Oblast, Russia. It is located in the west of the oblast. The area of the district is 1,243 square kilometers (480 sq mi). Its administrative center is the rural locality (a settlement) of Betlitsa. Population: 7,451 (2021 Census); 7,831 (2010 Census); 9,700 (2002 Census); 11,697 (1989 Soviet census). The population of Betlitsa accounts for 53.1% of the district's population.
