= Ferzikovo railway station =

Coordinates: 54.5150°N 36.7578°E

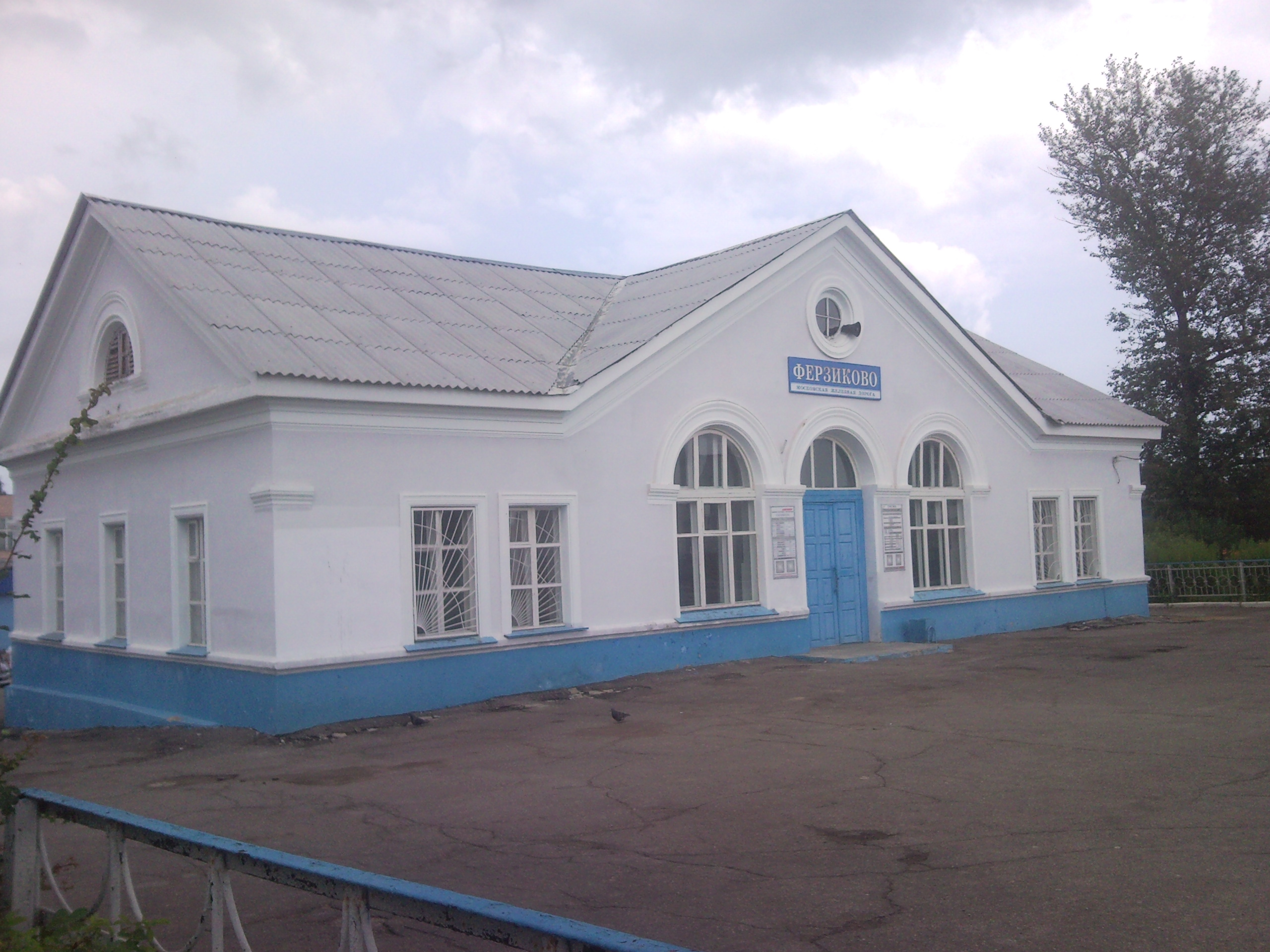

Ferzikovo railway station (Russian: станция Ферзиково) is a train station Moscow Railway in urban-type settlements Ferzikovo in Kaluga Oblast. It opened in 1874. The station consists of two low platforms: the side and the island. Any station with a waiting room and a suburban insurance fund. Electrification of the station is not available, suburban carried diesel train. At the station, stop all suburban trains through Kaluga — Tula, including accelerated diesel train links Kaluga — Tula and Kaluga — Tula — Uzlovaja. In the summer of 2013 through the station runs a small number of long-distance trains with a particular timetable, none of them stops at the station did not have.
