= Novoselki, Komsomolsky District, Ivanovo Oblast =

Novoselki Новосёлки
- Village
- Location within Ivanovo Oblast Location within Russia
- Coordinates: 57°03′N 40°24′E
- Country: Russia
- Region: Ivanovo Oblast
- District: Komsomolsky District
- Time zone: UTC+3:00

Novoselki (Russian: Новосёлки) is a rural locality (a selo) in Komsomolsky District, Ivanovo Oblast, Russia. Population: 44 (2010 census);

== Geography ==
This rural locality is located 4 kilometres (2.5 mi) from Komsomolsk (the district's administrative centre), 34 kilometres (21 mi) from Ivanovo (the capital of Ivanovo Oblast), and 223 kilometres (139 mi) from Moscow. Ivankovo is the nearest rural locality.
