= Betlitsa =

Rural locality in Kaluga Oblast, Russia

Coordinates: 54°00′57″N 33°56′44″E

Betlitsa (Russian: Бетлица) is a rural locality (a settlement) and the administrative center of Kuybyshevsky District, Kaluga Oblast, Russia. Population: 3,959 (2021 census); 3,589 (2010 census); 3,868 (2002 census); 3,911 (1989 Soviet census).
