= Durakovo =

Village in Kaluga Oblast, Russia

Durakovo (Russian: Дураково; the name may be interpreted as "the <settlement> of fools") is a village in Zhukovsky District, Kaluga Oblast, Russia. According to the 2010 Russian census, the population was 0. In 2002 its population was 4.

== Addiction rehabilitation center ==
The village houses a residential addiction rehabilitation center, also named Durakovo (54.964218°N 36.688658°E), for individuals with alcohol and drug addictions; residents’ ages range from 15 to 67. It was founded by businessman Mikhail Morozov (Михаил Федорович Морозов). The center was accepted to be the second compound of the Moscow Novospassky Monastery.

In 2008, Nino Kirtadze released a documentary film entitled "For God, Tsar and the Fatherland" (alternative title: "Durakovo: Village of Fools"), where the center was described as "a microcosm of rising nationalist zealotry". The film received the 2008 Sundance Film Festival directing award.
