= Novoselki, Vologda Oblast =

Novoselki Новоселки
- Village
- Location within Vologda Oblast Location within Russia
- Coordinates: 59°06′N 38°45′E
- Country: Russia
- Region: Vologda Oblast
- District: Sheksninsky District
- Time zone: UTC+3:00

Novoselki (Russian: Новоселки) is a rural locality (a village) in Lyubomirovskoye Rural Settlement, Sheksninsky District, Vologda Oblast, Russia. The population was 4 as of 2002.

== Geography ==
Novoselki is located 28 km southeast of Sheksna (the district's administrative centre) by road. Levo is the nearest rural locality.
