= Ferzikovsky District =

Ferzikovsky District Ферзиковский район (Russian)
- District
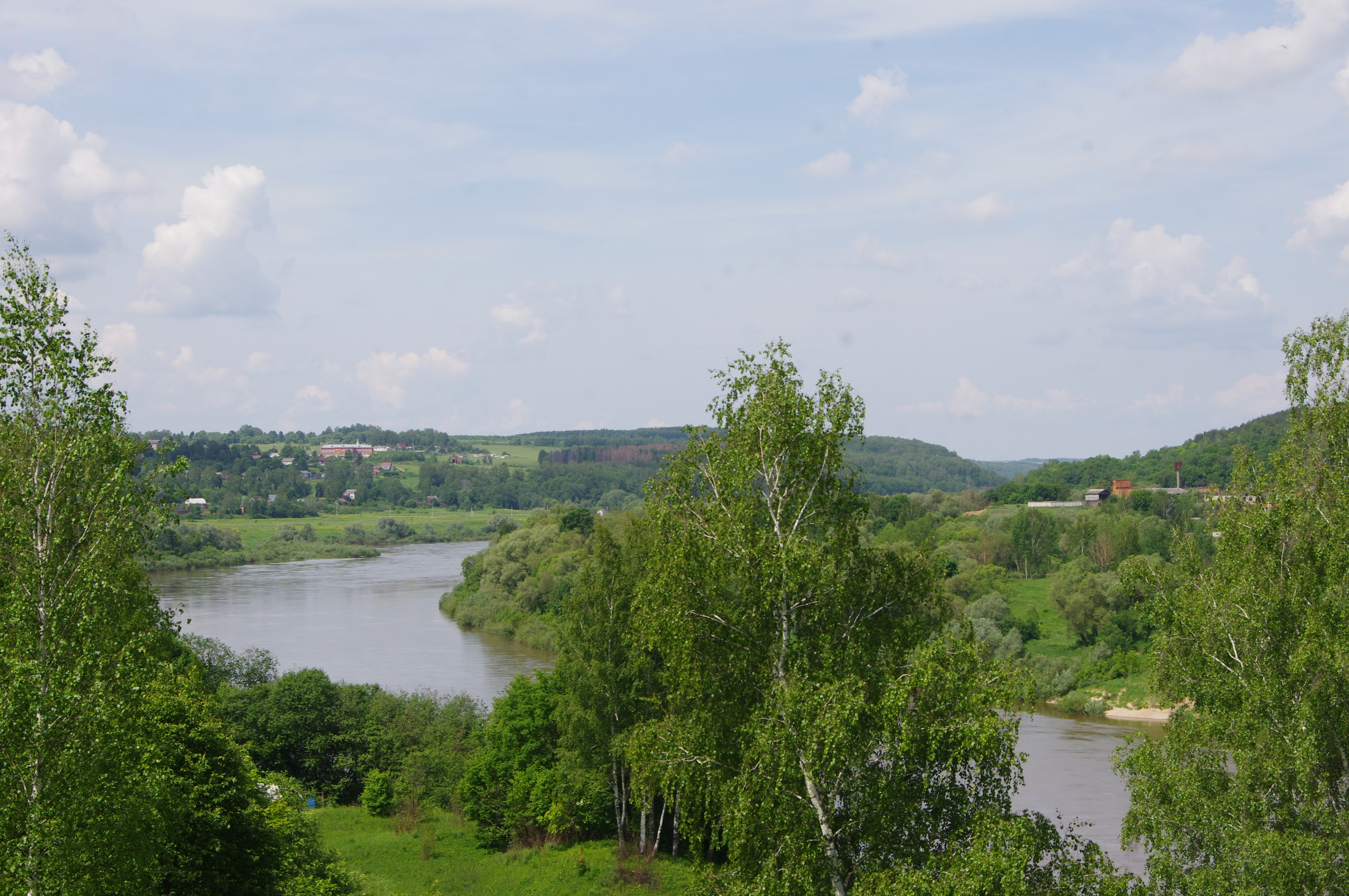
- Landscape of Ferzikovsky District

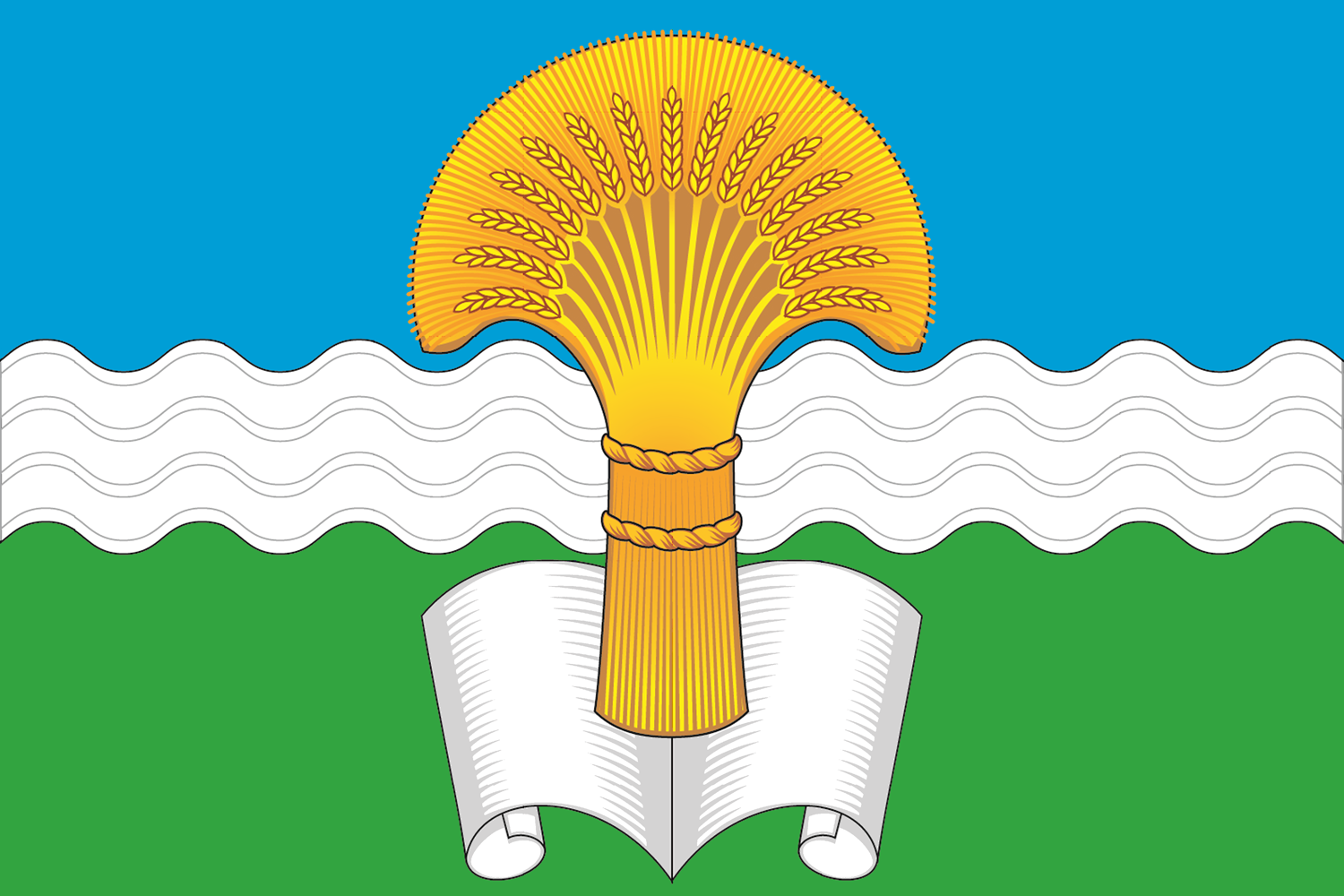
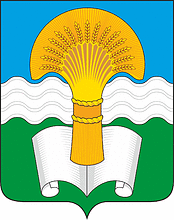
- Flag Coat of arms
- Location of Ferzikovsky District in Kaluga Oblast
- Coordinates: 54°31′N 36°46′E
- Country: Russia
- Federal subject: Kaluga Oblast
- Established: 12 July 1929
- Administrative center: Ferzikovo

Area
  - Total: 1,249.9 km^{2} (482.6 sq mi)

Population (2010 Census)
  - Total: 15,789
  - Density: 12.632/km^{2} (32.717/sq mi)

Administrative structure
  - Inhabited localities: 1 urban-type settlements, 155 rural localities

Municipal structure
  - Municipally incorporated as: Ferzikovsky Municipal District
  - Municipal divisions: 0 urban settlements, 15 rural settlements
- Time zone: UTC+3 (MSK)
- OKTMO ID: 29644000
- Website: http://admferzik.ru

Population of Ferzikovsky District
- 2021 Census: 17,557
- 2010 Census: 15,789
- 2002 Census: 15,804
- 1989 Census: 17,182
- 1979 Census: 19,055

Ferzikovsky District (Russian: Фе́рзиковский райо́н) is an administrative and municipal district (raion), one of the twenty-four in Kaluga Oblast, Russia. It is located in the east of the oblast. The area of the district is 1,249.9 square kilometers (482.6 sq mi). Its administrative center is the urban locality (a settlement) of Ferzikovo. As of the 2021 Census, the total population of the district was 17,557, with the population of Ferzikovo accounting for 25.5% of that number.

== Administrative and municipal status ==
Administratively, the district is not divided into smaller units and has direct jurisdiction over one settlement of urban type (Ferzikovo) and 155 rural localities. Municipally, the territory of the district is incorporated as Ferzikovsky Municipal District, with the exception of the selo of Novozhdamirovo, which is municipally a part of Kaluga Urban Okrug.
