= Kozlovo, Ustyuzhensky District, Vologda Oblast =

Kozlovo Козлово
- Village
- Location within Vologda Oblast Location within Russia
- Coordinates: 58°38′N 36°28′E
- Country: Russia
- Region: Vologda Oblast
- District: Ustyuzhensky District
- Time zone: UTC+3:00

Kozlovo (Russian: Козлово) is a rural locality (a village) in Nikiforovskoye Rural Settlement, Ustyuzhensky District, Vologda Oblast, Russia. The population was 12 as of 2002.

== Geography ==
Kozlovo is located 25 km (16 mi) south of Ustyuzhna (the district's administrative centre) by road. Venitsy is the nearest rural locality.
