= Novoselki, Palekhsky District, Ivanovo Oblast =

Novoselki Новосёлки
- Village
- Location within Ivanovo Oblast Location within Russia
- Coordinates: 56°45′N 41°45′E
- Country: Russia
- Region: Ivanovo Oblast
- District: Palekhsky District
- Time zone: UTC+3:00

Novoselki (Russian: Новосёлки) is a rural locality (a village) in Palekhsky District, Ivanovo Oblast, Russia. Population: 7 (2010 census);

== Geography ==
This rural locality is located 7 kilometres (4.3 mi) from Palekh (the district's administrative centre), 55 kilometres (34 mi) from Ivanovo (capital of Ivanovo Oblast) and 276 kilometres (171 mi) from Moscow. Timenka is the nearest rural locality.
