= Naryshkin =

Naryshkin (Russian: Нарышкин) is a Russian masculine surname, and its feminine counterpart is Naryshkina. The name may refer to:

- Members of the noble Naryshkin family, including:
  - Kirill Naryshkin (1623–1691), Russian boyar and maternal grandfather of Peter the Great
  - Natalya Naryshkina (1651–1694), Tsaritsa of Russia and mother of Peter the Great
  - Aleksandr Naryshkin (1760–1826), Russian statesman
  - Maria Naryshkina (1779–1854), mistress of Alexander I of Russia
- Sergey Naryshkin (born 1954), Russian politician

== See also ==
- Naryshkin Baroque, a style of Baroque architecture that was popular in Moscow
- Naryshkin-Shuvalov Palace, a neoclassical palace in Saint Petersburg
