= Marine Station (Murmansk) =

- Морской вокзал
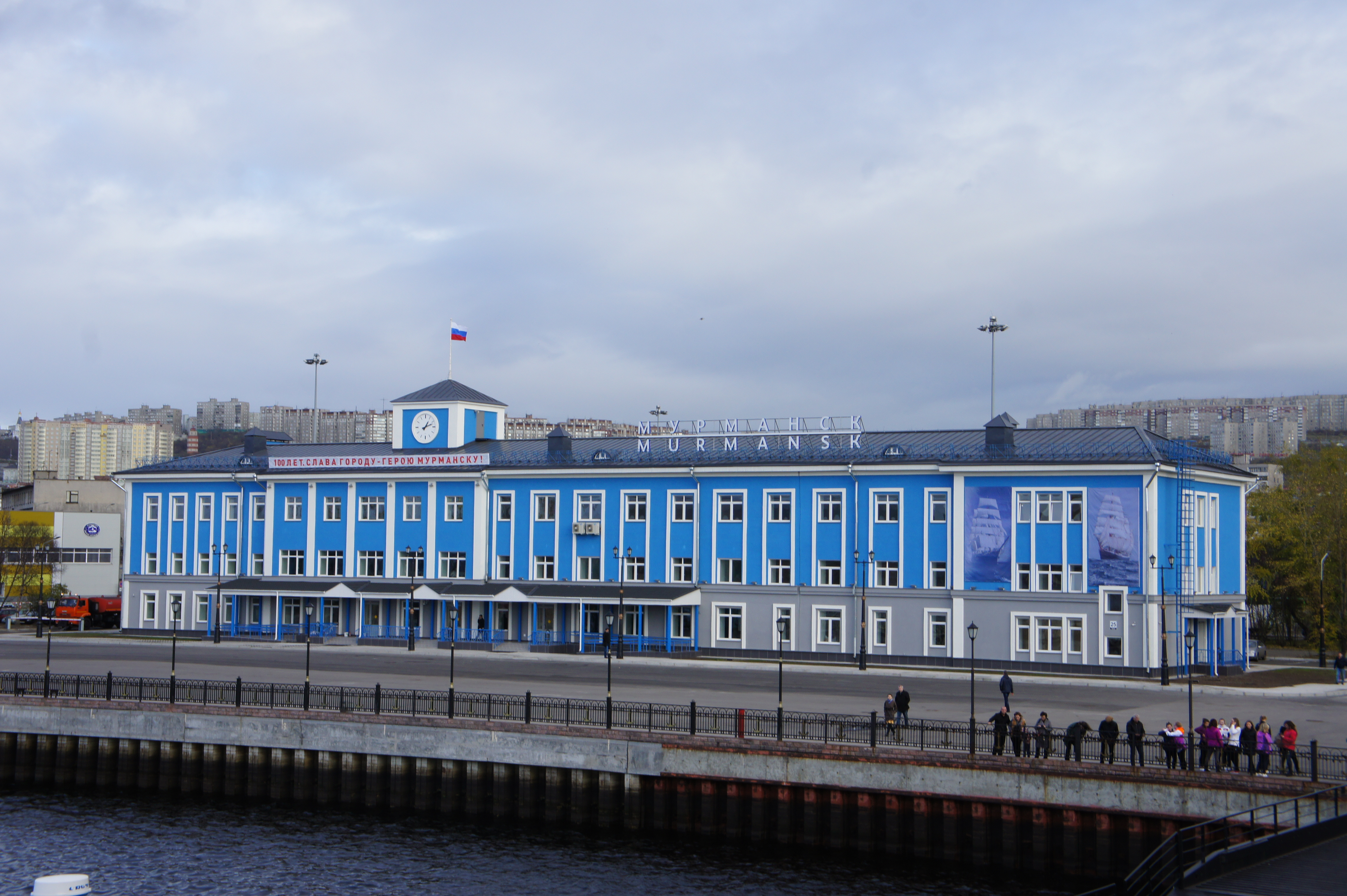
- View of the Marine Station

General information
- Architectural style: constructivist architecture
- Location: Murmansk, Russia
- Coordinates: 68.9667°N 33.0833°E

The Marine Station or Marine Terminal (Russian: Морской вокзал) is a maritime passenger terminal located in the city of Murmansk. Marine Station has two berths, one of which is a pontoon berth. There is a small embankment at the sea terminal. The Murmansk Shipping Company's MS Klavdia Yelanskaya berths at the terminal. The Klavdia Yelanskaya carries passengers along the coast of the Kola Peninsula, connecting Murmansk with the settlements of Ostrovnoy, Chapoma, Chavanga and Sosnovka. Prior to January 2013 boats from the station connected it with Abram-Mys, a remote microdistrict of Murmansk.

In 2009, the world's first nuclear-powered icebreaker Lenin was docked near the terminal as a museum ship.

In 2016, a reconstruction of the building added another storey and a clock tower in honor of the 100th anniversary of the city.
