= Moshonki =

Rural locality in Meshchovsky District, Kaluga Oblast, Russia

Coordinates: 54°16′56″N 35°37′32″E

Moshonki (Russian: Мошонки) is a rural locality (a selo) in Meshchovsky District of Kaluga Oblast, Russia, located 155 kilometers (96 mi) southwest of Moscow River Serena (A tributary of the Oka tributary Zhizdra).

Crossing the village is the Moscow–Kiev railway line. The nearest station at Kudrinskaya is about 7 kilometers (4.3 mi) away from Moshonki.

The best known feature of Moshonki is the structure of the place Alexander Nevsky Church from the 18th century, which was built in the 1930s, destroyed by a fire, and recently rebuilt.
