= Kozlovo, Astrakhan Oblast =

Kozlovo Козлово
- Selo
- Location within Astrakhan Oblast Location within Russia
- Coordinates: 46°25′N 48°33′E
- Country: Russia
- Region: Astrakhan Oblast
- District: Volodarsky District
- Time zone: UTC+4:00

Kozlovo (Russian: Козлово) is a rural locality (a selo) and the administrative center of Kozlovsky Selsoviet of Volodarsky District, Astrakhan Oblast, Russia. The population was 1,834 as of 2010. There are 10 streets.

== Geography ==
Kozlovo is located 3 km (1.9 mi) northeast of Volodarsky (the district's administrative centre) by road. Paromny is the nearest rural locality.
