= Kozlovo, Sokolsky District, Vologda Oblast =

Kozlovo Козлово
- Village
- Location within Vologda Oblast Location within Russia
- Coordinates: 59°38′N 40°31′E
- Country: Russia
- Region: Vologda Oblast
- District: Sokolsky District
- Time zone: UTC+3:00

Kozlovo (Russian: Козлово) is a rural locality (a village) in Dvinitskoye Rural Settlement, Sokolsky District, Vologda Oblast, Russia. The population was 10 as of 2002.

== Geography ==
Kozlovo is located 49 km (30.4 mi) northeast of Sokol (the district's administrative centre) by road. Vyazovoye is the nearest rural locality.
