= Kozlovo, Vladimir Oblast =

Kozlovo Козлово
- Village
- Location within Vladimir Oblast Location within Russia
- Coordinates: 56°19′N 42°06′E
- Country: Russia
- Region: Vladimir Oblast
- District: Vyaznikovsky District
- Time zone: UTC+3:00

Kozlovo (Russian: Козлово) is a rural locality (a village) in Gorod Vyazniki, Vyaznikovsky District, Vladimir Oblast, Russia. The population was 153 as of 2010.

== Geography ==
Kozlovo is located 13 km north of Vyazniki (the district's administrative centre) by road. Palkino is the nearest rural locality.
