= Spas-Zagorye =

Spas-Zagorye Спас-Загорье
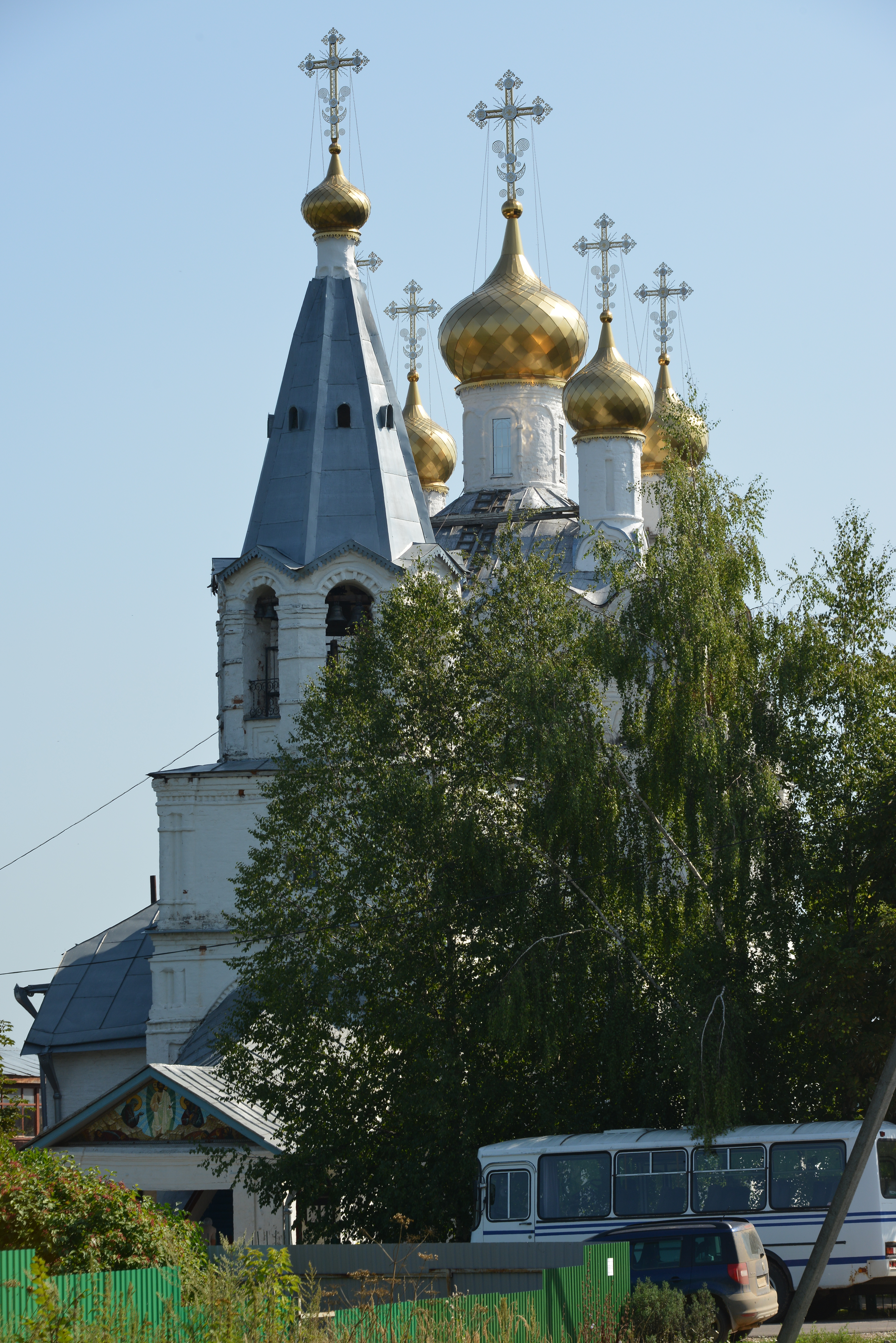
- Spas-Zagorye

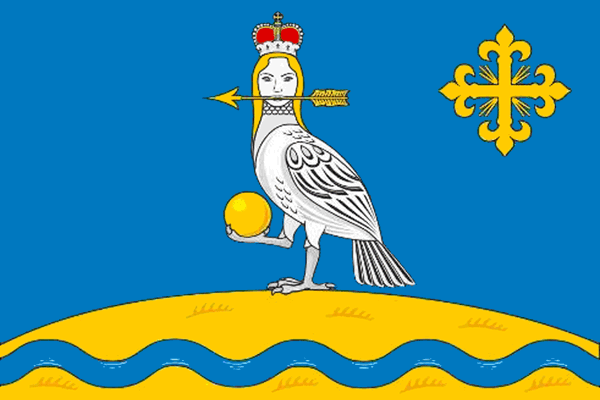
- Flag
- Interactive map of Spas-Zagorye
- Location of Spas-Zagorye Spas-Zagorye (Kaluga Oblast)
- Coordinates: 55°03′04″N 36°35′34″E
- Country: Russia
- Federal subject: Kaluga Oblast

Government
  - The head of rural settlement: Gennady Efimov

Area
  - Total: 53.76 km^{2} (20.76 sq mi)

Population
  - Estimate (2010): 208 )
- Time zone: UTC+3 (MSK)
- Postal code: 249052
- OKTMO ID: 29623440101
- Website: www.spas-zagorje.ru

Spas-Zagorye is a village, administrative centre of rural settlements in the municipal area of Maloyaroslavetsky District of the Kaluga region, Russia.

The village of Spas-Zagorye, located on the bend of the Protva river, 9.5 km from Maloyaroslavets and 3 km from Obninsk.

== Population ==

The data in the table, sources: Spas-Zagorye (references) in Russian Wiki

== History ==
The first mention of Spas-Zagorye date back to the mid-fifteenth century, at a time when the village was included in the specific Obolenskoe the Principality. In the possession of the genus Obolensky village was located until 1919.

According to legend, in 1721, the village was visited by Peter I. In 1812, Spas-Zagorye placed bet Mikhail Kutuzov. The village itself was the centre of hostilities. Despite the coming cold, the villagers dismantled their homes for the construction of a terminal for Russian troops. In memory of this in 1962 in the village was erected a memorial stone with a commemorative inscription.

With the formation of the Russian Empire provinces, the village was part of the Saviour parish Maloyaroslavetsky district.

Currently, the village of Spas-Zagorye integrated absorption of the village Naryshkino, is the administrative centre of the rural area of Maloyaroslavets district of Kaluga region, Central Federal District of the Russian Federation.

== Cultural heritage ==
=== Temple in honor of the Transfiguration ===
Russian Orthodox Church (operating)

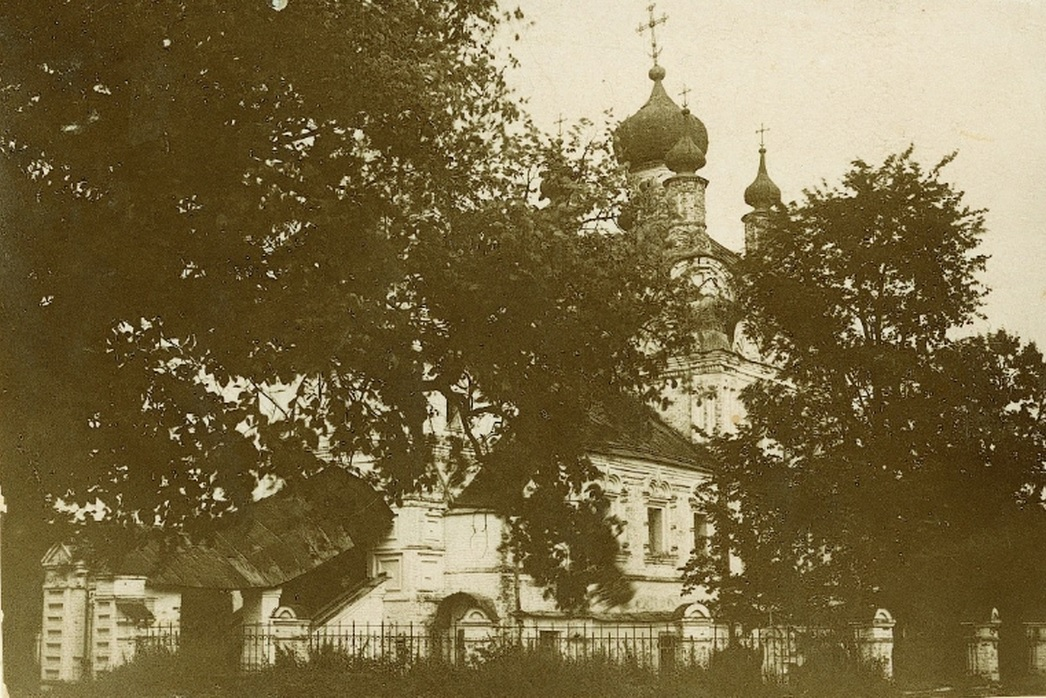
Temple in honor of the Transfiguration (XX century, the beginning)

The story of the Transfiguration Church was traditionally conducted with 1614 and starts with the name of the outstanding figure of Russian history of the early seventeenth century Prince Boris Mikhailovich Lykov-Obolenskiy

A stone Church built in 1614 by Prince B. M. Lykov-Obolenskiy, who restored the St. Paphnutius Borovsk monastery after the destruction of 1610. His wife, Princess Anastasia, in schema anisii had the sister of Patriarch Filaret and the aunt of Tsar Mikhail Fyodorovich Romanov. In the construction of the temple was also attended by the princes Naryshkin, the estate which was adjacent to the village.

The Church building is two-storied. The upper floor – summer Church of the Transfiguration, on the North side built a chapel in honour of the Intercession of the Theotokos, and in the refectory the altar in honor of the exaltation of the cross. In the basement, winter the lower temple with one altar in honor of the Our Lady of Kazan.

Extant temple architecturally represents a striking example of the national style of Russian architecture of the late 17th century, characteristic features of which are the five domes, the completion of the arch building, the framing of the domes of the Church. The upper temple was built on the ground floor and has two tiers of Windows framed with frames consisting of two columns connected at the top brace. The steepled bell tower, and the verge of its third tier is oriented to the cardinal.

== Sources ==
- Преображенский, М. Т. (1891). Памятники древнерусского зодчества в пределах Калужской губернии : Опыт исслед. древ. зодчества по губ. акад. архитектуры М. Т. Преображенского (in Russian). Санкт-Петербург: Академия художеств. p. 119.
