= Khvastovichsky District =

Khvastovichsky District Хвастовичский район (Russian)
- District
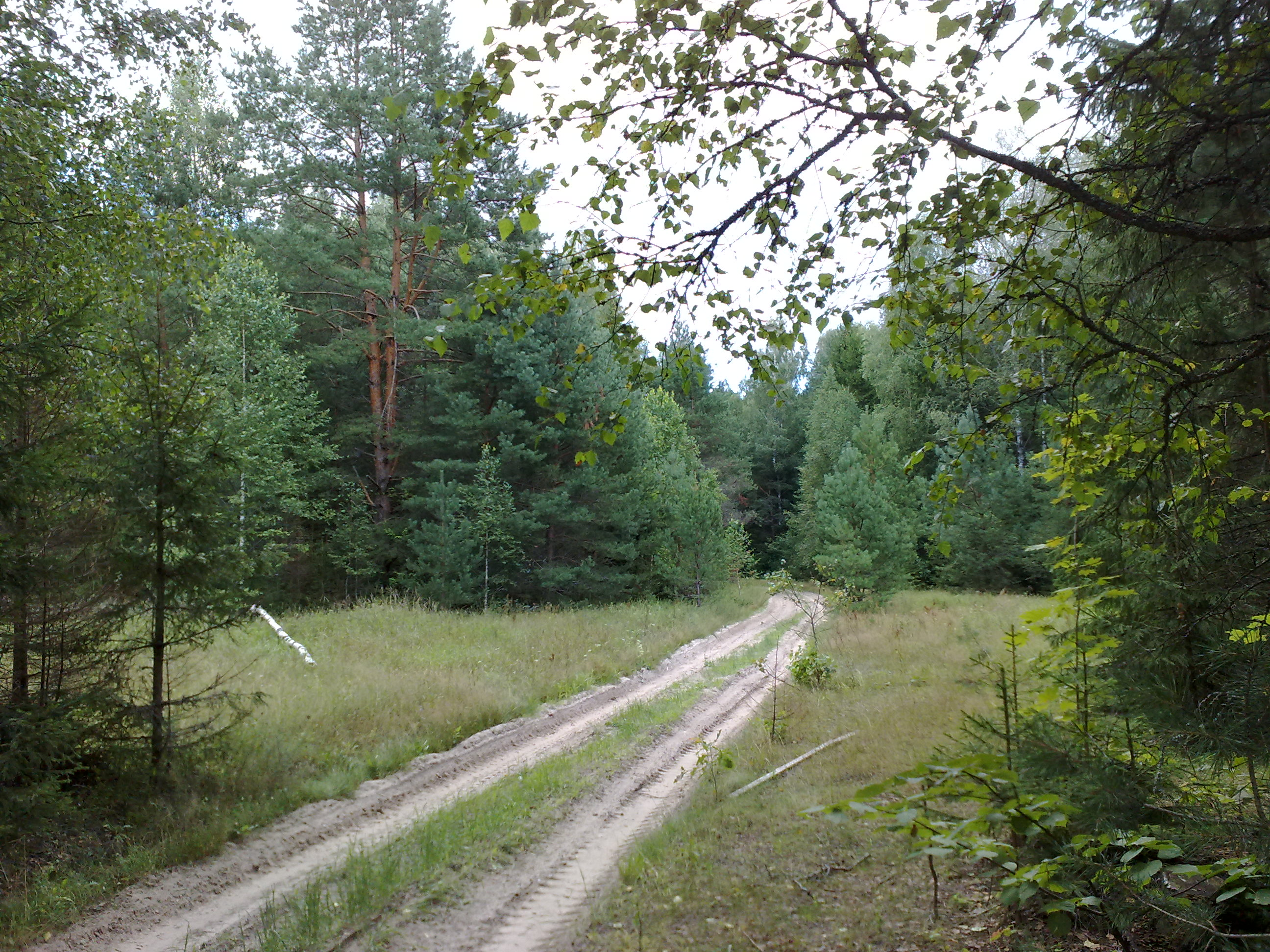
- Forest in Khvastovichsky District

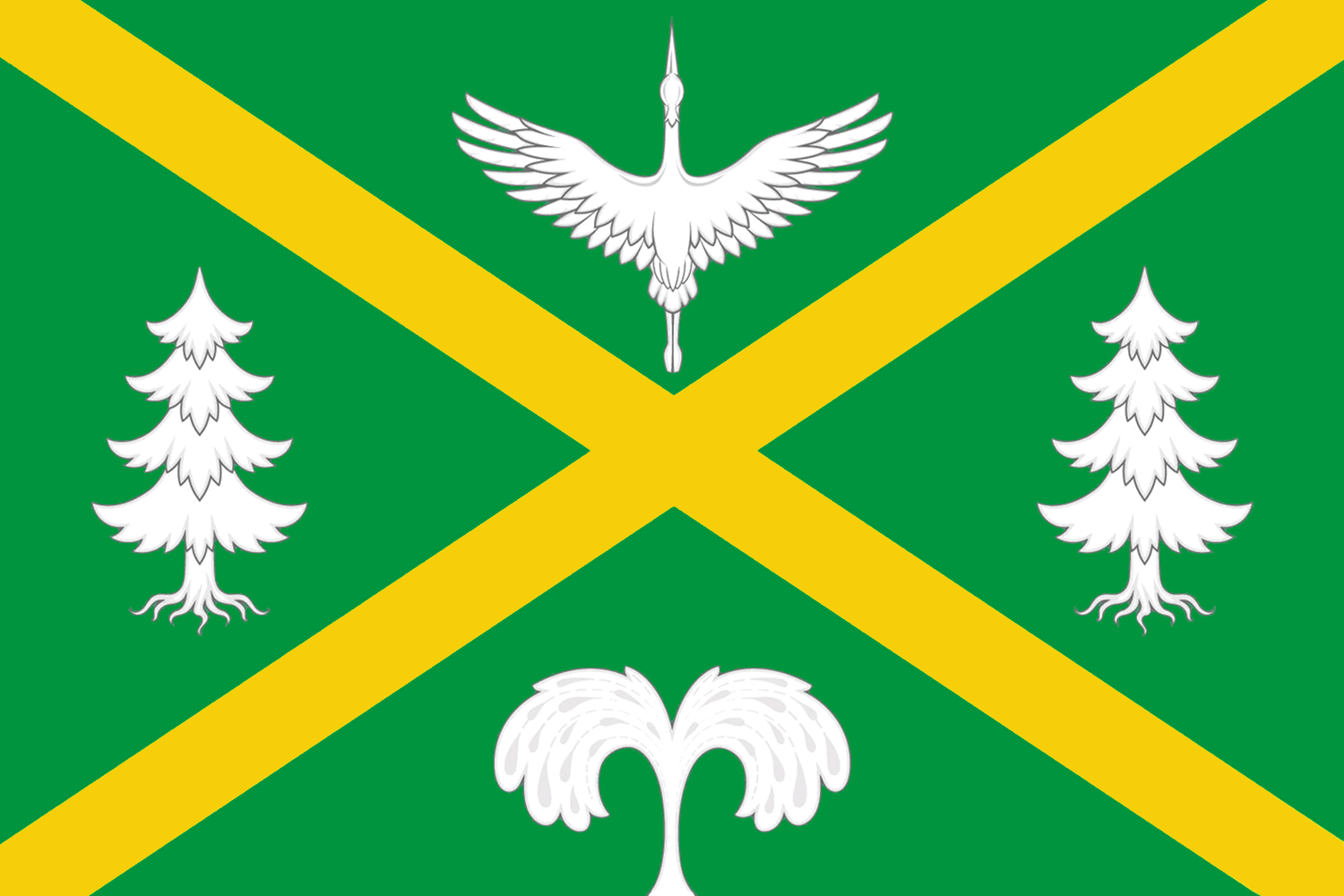
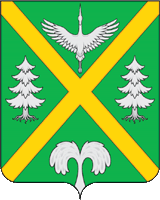
- Flag Coat of arms
- Location of Khvastovichsky District in Kaluga Oblast
- Coordinates: 53°28′N 35°06′E
- Country: Russia
- Federal subject: Kaluga Oblast
- Established: 1 October 1929
- Administrative center: Khvastovichi

Area
  - Total: 1,410 km^{2} (540 sq mi)

Population (2010 Census)
  - Total: 10,852
  - Density: 7.70/km^{2} (19.9/sq mi)
  - Urban: 0%
  - Rural: 100%

Administrative structure
  - Inhabited localities: 83 rural localities

Municipal structure
  - Municipally incorporated as: Khvastovichsky Municipal District
  - Municipal divisions: 0 urban settlements, 15 rural settlements
- Time zone: UTC+3 (MSK)
- OKTMO ID: 29646000
- Website: http://хвастовичский-район.рф

Population of Khvastovichsky District
- 2021 Census: 9,888
- 2010 Census: 10,852
- 2002 Census: 12,677
- 1989 Census: 15,522
- 1979 Census: 21,707

Khvastovichsky District (Russian: Хвастовичский райо́н) is an administrative and municipal district (raion), one of the twenty-four in Kaluga Oblast, Russia. It is located in the south of the oblast. The area of the district is 1,410 square kilometers (540 sq mi). Its administrative center is the rural locality (a selo) of Khvastovichi. As of the 2021 Census, the total population of the district was 9,888, with the population of Khvastovichi accounting for 44.8% of that number.
