= Khvastovichi =

Rural locality in Kaluga Oblast, Russia

Coordinates: 53°28′11″N 35°05′38″E

Khvastovichi (Russian: Хвастовичи) is a rural locality (a selo) and the administrative center of Khvastovichsky District, Kaluga Oblast, Russia. Population: 4,425 (2021 census); 4,509 (2010 census); 4,596 (2002 census); 4,485 (1989 Soviet census).
