= Novozhdamirovo =

Novozhdamirovo Новождамирово
- Selo
- Location within Kaluga Oblast Location within Russia
- Coordinates: 54.514°N 36.363°E
- Country: Russia
- Region: Kaluga Oblast
- District: Kaluga
- Time zone: UTC+03:00

Novozhdamirovo (Russian: Новождамирово) is a rural locality (a village) in Kaluga Urban Okrug, Kaluga Oblast, Russia. 80 (2010 census);
