= Kozlovo, Kaluga, Kaluga Oblast =

Human settlement in Kaluga Urban Okrug, Kaluga Oblast, Russia

Coordinates: 54.511°N 36.031°E

Kozlovo (Russian: Козлово) is a rural locality (a village) in Kaluga Urban Okrug, Kaluga Oblast, Russia. 13 (2010 Census);
