= Ferzikovo =

Ferzikovo Ферзиково
- Town
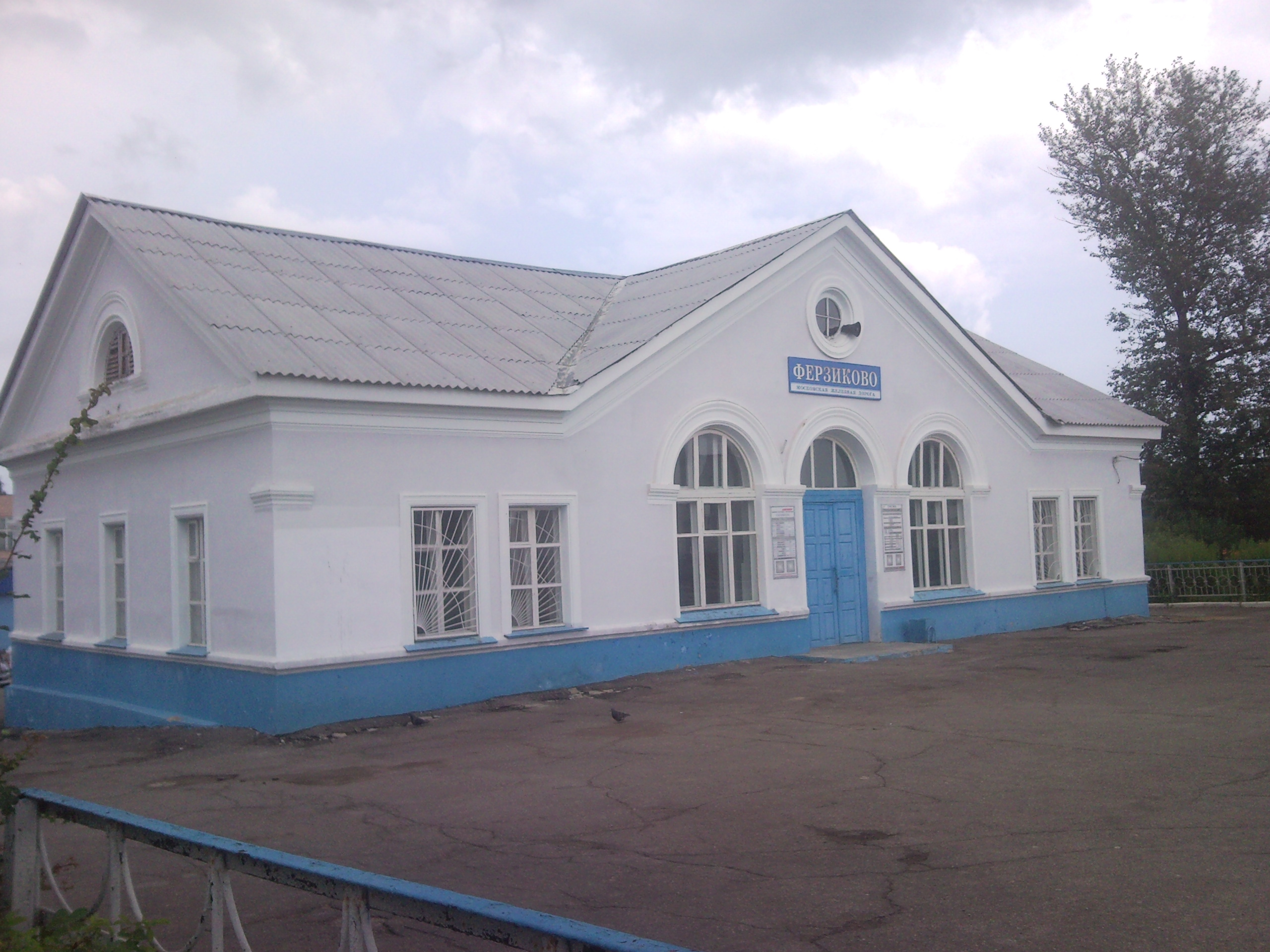
- Ferzikovo railway station
- Interactive map of Ferzikovo
- Location of Ferzikovo Ferzikovo (Kaluga Oblast)
- Coordinates: 54°31′00″N 36°46′00″E
- Country: Russia
- Federal subject: Kaluga Oblast
- Administrative district: Ferzikovsky District

Population (2010 Census)
  - Total: 4,696
  - Estimate (2002): 4,392 (−6.5%)

Administrative status
  - Capital of: Ferzikovsky District

Municipal status
  - Municipal district: Ferzikovsky Municipal District
  - Urban settlement: Ferzikovsky Urban Settlement
  - Capital of: Ferzikovsky Municipal District, Ferzikovsky Urban Settlement
- Time zone: UTC+3 (MSK)
- Postal code: 249800
- Dialing code: +7 48437
- OKTMO ID: 29644402101

Ferzikovo (Russian: Фе́рзиково) is an urban locality (a settlement) and the administrative center of Ferzikovsky District of Kaluga Oblast, Russia, located 32 kilometers (20 mi) east of Kaluga and approximately 3 kilometers (1.9 mi) south of the Kaluga–Tarusa route. Population: 4,472 (2021 census); 4,696 (2010 census); 4,392 (2002 census); 4,570 (1989 Soviet census). Postal code: 249800. Dialing code: +7 48437.

== History ==
It was founded in 1874.

== Government ==
The chief of the Administration is Alexander Albertovich Seryakov.

== Economy ==
- Electric heaters manufacturing plant
- Sawn timber production
- Agricultural association

=== Transportation ===
The settlement serves as a railway station of the Kaluga–Tula railway.
