= Zhukovo =

Zhukovo (Russian: Жуково) is the name of several rural localities in Russia.

== Modern localities ==
=== Arkhangelsk Oblast ===
As of 2012, one rural locality in Arkhangelsk Oblast bears this name:

- Zhukovo, Arkhangelsk Oblast, a village in Irtovsky Selsoviet of Lensky District

=== Republic of Bashkortostan ===
As of 2012, one rural locality in the Republic of Bashkortostan bears this name:

- Zhukovo, Republic of Bashkortostan, a selo in Zhukovsky Selsoviet of Ufimsky District

=== Belgorod Oblast ===
As of 2012, one rural locality in Belgorod Oblast bears this name:

- Zhukovo, Belgorod Oblast, a selo in Alexeyevsky District

=== Bryansk Oblast ===
As of 2012, three rural localities in Bryansk Oblast bear this name:

- Zhukovo, Dubrovsky District, Bryansk Oblast, a village in Aleshinsky Rural Administrative Okrug of Dubrovsky District; 53°37′N 33°27′E
- Zhukovo, Rognedinsky District, Bryansk Oblast, a village in Voronovsky Rural Administrative Okrug of Rognedinsky District; 53°47′N 33°45′E
- Zhukovo, Unechsky District, Bryansk Oblast, a village in Ivaytensky Rural Administrative Okrug of Unechsky District; 52°49′N 33°4′E

=== Chelyabinsk Oblast ===
As of 2012, one rural locality in Chelyabinsk Oblast bears this name:

- Zhukovo, Chelyabinsk Oblast, a village in Bagaryaksky Selsoviet of Kaslinsky District

=== Ivanovo Oblast ===
As of 2012, four rural localities in Ivanovo Oblast bear this name:

- Zhukovo, Furmanovsky District, Ivanovo Oblast, a village in Furmanovsky District
- Zhukovo, Ivanovsky District, Ivanovo Oblast, a village in Ivanovsky District
- Zhukovo, Palekhsky District, Ivanovo Oblast, a village in Palekhsky District
- Zhukovo, Puchezhsky District, Ivanovo Oblast, a village in Puchezhsky District

=== Kaluga Oblast ===
As of 2012, two rural localities in Kaluga Oblast bear this name:

- Zhukovo, Ulyanovsky District, Kaluga Oblast, a village in Ulyanovsky District
- Zhukovo, Zhukovsky District, Kaluga Oblast, a village in Zhukovsky District

=== Kirov Oblast ===
As of 2012, one rural locality in Kirov Oblast bears this name:

- Zhukovo, Kirov Oblast, a village in Utmanovsky Rural Okrug of Podosinovsky District; 60°8′N 46°35′E

=== Kostroma Oblast ===
As of 2012, three rural localities in Kostroma Oblast bear this name:

- Zhukovo, Galichsky District, Kostroma Oblast, a village in Orekhovskoye Settlement of Galichsky District; 58°28′N 41°53′E
- Zhukovo, Kadyysky District, Kostroma Oblast, a village in Selishchenskoye Settlement of Kadyysky District; 57°46′N 43°15′E
- Zhukovo, Susaninsky District, Kostroma Oblast, a village in Severnoye Settlement of Susaninsky District; 58°1′N 41°27′E

=== Kurgan Oblast ===
As of 2012, one rural locality in Kurgan Oblast bears this name:

- Zhukovo, Kurgan Oblast, a selo in Zhukovsky Selsoviet of Kurtamyshsky District; 54°56′N 64°15′E

=== Kursk Oblast ===
As of 2012, one rural locality in Kursk Oblast bears this name:

- Zhukovo, Kursk Oblast, a village in Nizhensky Selsoviet of Cheremisinovsky District

=== Lipetsk Oblast ===
As of 2012, two rural localities in Lipetsk Oblast bear this name:

- Zhukovo, Dankovsky District, Lipetsk Oblast, a village in Speshnevo-Ivanovsky Selsoviet of Dankovsky District; 53°16′N 38°57′E
- Zhukovo, Krasninsky District, Lipetsk Oblast, a village in Krasninsky Selsoviet of Krasninsky District; 52°53′N 38°45′E

=== Republic of Mordovia ===
As of 2012, one rural locality in the Republic of Mordovia bears this name:

- Zhukovo, Republic of Mordovia, a selo in Zhukovsky Selsoviet of Torbeyevsky District; 54°6′N 43°16′E

=== Moscow Oblast ===
As of 2012, seven rural localities in Moscow Oblast bear this name:

- Zhukovo, Domodedovo, Moscow Oblast, a village under the administrative jurisdiction of Domodedovo Town Under Oblast Jurisdiction; 55°25′N 37°40′E
- Zhukovo, Dmitrovsky District, Moscow Oblast, a village under the administrative jurisdiction of the Town of Yakhroma in Dmitrovsky District; 56°16′N 37°22′E
- Zhukovo, Klinsky District, Moscow Oblast, a village under the administrative jurisdiction of the Town of Klin in Klinsky District; 56°29′N 36°35′E
- Zhukovo, Ramensky District, Moscow Oblast, a village in Chulkovskoye Rural Settlement of Ramensky District; 55°30′N 38°1′E
- Zhukovo, Peshkovskoye Rural Settlement, Solnechnogorsky District, Moscow Oblast, a settlement in Peshkovskoye Rural Settlement of Solnechnogorsky District; 56°6′N 37°2′E
- Zhukovo, Sokolovskoye Rural Settlement, Solnechnogorsky District, Moscow Oblast, a village in Sokolovskoye Rural Settlement of Solnechnogorsky District; 56°6′N 36°57′E
- Zhukovo, Taldomsky District, Moscow Oblast, a village in Tempovoye Rural Settlement of Taldomsky District; 56°41′N 37°23′E

=== Nizhny Novgorod Oblast ===
As of 2012, three rural localities in Nizhny Novgorod Oblast bear this name:

- Zhukovo, Chkalovsky District, Nizhny Novgorod Oblast, a village in Kotelnitsky Selsoviet of Chkalovsky District
- Zhukovo, Krasnobakovsky District, Nizhny Novgorod Oblast, a village in Zubilikhinsky Selsoviet of Krasnobakovsky District; 57°1′N 45°7′E
- Zhukovo, Sokolsky District, Nizhny Novgorod Oblast, a village in Volzhsky Selsoviet of Sokolsky District; 57°24′N 43°23′E

=== Novgorod Oblast ===
As of 2012, three rural localities in Novgorod Oblast bear this name:

- Zhukovo, Borovichsky District, Novgorod Oblast, a village in Konchansko-Suvorovskoye Settlement of Borovichsky District
- Zhukovo, Moshenskoy District, Novgorod Oblast, a village in Kalininskoye Settlement of Moshenskoy District
- Zhukovo, Starorussky District, Novgorod Oblast, a village in Novoselskoye Settlement of Starorussky District

=== Orenburg Oblast ===
As of 2012, one rural locality in Orenburg Oblast bears this name:

- Zhukovo, Orenburg Oblast, a village in Pilyuginsky Selsoviet of Buguruslansky District

=== Penza Oblast ===
As of 2012, one rural locality in Penza Oblast bears this name:

- Zhukovo, Penza Oblast, a village in Volynshchinsky Selsoviet of Bekovsky District

=== Perm Krai ===
As of 2012, one rural locality in Perm Krai bears this name:

- Zhukovo, Perm Krai, a village in Yusvinsky District

=== Pskov Oblast ===
As of 2012, eighteen rural localities in Pskov Oblast bear this name:

- Zhukovo, Gdovsky District, Pskov Oblast, a village in Gdovsky District
- Zhukovo, Kunyinsky District, Pskov Oblast, a village in Kunyinsky District
- Zhukovo, Loknyansky District, Pskov Oblast, a village in Loknyansky District
- Zhukovo (Ust-Dolysskaya Rural Settlement), Nevelsky District, Pskov Oblast, a village in Nevelsky District; municipally, a part of Ust-Dolysskaya Rural Settlement of that district
- Zhukovo (Artemovskaya Rural Settlement), Nevelsky District, Pskov Oblast, a village in Nevelsky District; municipally, a part of Artemovskaya Rural Settlement of that district
- Zhukovo (Zhadritskaya Rural Settlement), Novorzhevsky District, Pskov Oblast, a village in Novorzhevsky District; municipally, a part of Zhadritskaya Rural Settlement of that district
- Zhukovo (Vyborskaya Rural Settlement), Novorzhevsky District, Pskov Oblast, a village in Novorzhevsky District; municipally, a part of Vyborskaya Rural Settlement of that district
- Zhukovo (Veskinskaya Rural Settlement), Novorzhevsky District, Pskov Oblast, a village in Novorzhevsky District; municipally, a part of Veskinskaya Rural Settlement of that district
- Zhukovo (Stekhnovskaya Rural Settlement), Novorzhevsky District, Pskov Oblast, a village in Novorzhevsky District; municipally, a part of Stekhnovskaya Rural Settlement of that district
- Zhukovo (Runovskaya Rural Settlement), Novosokolnichesky District, Pskov Oblast, a village in Novosokolnichesky District; municipally, a part of Runovskaya Rural Settlement of that district
- Zhukovo (Mayevskaya Rural Settlement), Novosokolnichesky District, Pskov Oblast, a village in Novosokolnichesky District; municipally, a part of Mayevskaya Rural Settlement of that district
- Zhukovo, Opochetsky District, Pskov Oblast, a village in Opochetsky District
- Zhukovo, Ostrovsky District, Pskov Oblast, a village in Ostrovsky District
- Zhukovo (Palkinskaya Rural Settlement), Palkinsky District, Pskov Oblast, a village in Palkinsky District; municipally, a part of Palkinskaya Rural Settlement of that district
- Zhukovo (Novousitovskaya Rural Settlement), Palkinsky District, Pskov Oblast, a village in Palkinsky District; municipally, a part of Novousitovskaya Rural Settlement of that district
- Zhukovo (Kachanovskaya Rural Settlement), Palkinsky District, Pskov Oblast, a village in Palkinsky District; municipally, a part of Kachanovskaya Rural Settlement of that district
- Zhukovo, Pskovsky District, Pskov Oblast, a village in Pskovsky District
- Zhukovo, Pushkinogorsky District, Pskov Oblast, a village in Pushkinogorsky District

=== Ryazan Oblast ===
As of 2012, two rural localities in Ryazan Oblast bear this name:

- Zhukovo, Kasimovsky District, Ryazan Oblast, a village in Ardabyevsky Rural Okrug of Kasimovsky District
- Zhukovo, Ryazansky District, Ryazan Oblast, a village in Podvyazyevsky Rural Okrug of Ryazansky District

=== Smolensk Oblast ===
As of 2012, seven rural localities in Smolensk Oblast bear this name:

- Zhukovo, Demidovsky District, Smolensk Oblast, a village in Borkovskoye Rural Settlement of Demidovsky District
- Zhukovo, Dukhovshchinsky District, Smolensk Oblast, a village in Bulgakovskoye Rural Settlement of Dukhovshchinsky District
- Zhukovo, Gogolevskoye Rural Settlement, Monastyrshchinsky District, Smolensk Oblast, a village in Gogolevskoye Rural Settlement of Monastyrshchinsky District
- Zhukovo, Tatarskoye Rural Settlement, Monastyrshchinsky District, Smolensk Oblast, a village in Tatarskoye Rural Settlement of Monastyrshchinsky District
- Zhukovo, Safonovsky District, Smolensk Oblast, a village in Bogdanovshchinskoye Rural Settlement of Safonovsky District
- Zhukovo, Smolensky District, Smolensk Oblast, a village in Stabenskoye Rural Settlement of Smolensky District
- Zhukovo, Yartsevsky District, Smolensk Oblast, a village in Miropolskoye Rural Settlement of Yartsevsky District

=== Sverdlovsk Oblast ===
As of 2012, one rural locality in Sverdlovsk Oblast bears this name:

- Zhukovo, Sverdlovsk Oblast, a village in Aramashkovsky Selsoviet of Rezhevsky District

=== Republic of Tatarstan ===
As of 2012, one rural locality in the Republic of Tatarstan bears this name:

- Zhukovo, Republic of Tatarstan, a village in Tetyushsky District

=== Tomsk Oblast ===
As of 2012, one rural locality in Tomsk Oblast bears this name:

- Zhukovo, Tomsk Oblast, a selo in Krivosheinsky District

=== Tula Oblast ===
As of 2012, three rural localities in Tula Oblast bear this name:

- Zhukovo, Aleksinsky District, Tula Oblast, a village in Solopensky Rural Okrug of Aleksinsky District
- Zhukovo, Belyovsky District, Tula Oblast, a selo in Zhukovsky Rural Okrug of Belyovsky District
- Zhukovo, Venyovsky District, Tula Oblast, a village in Belkovsky Rural Okrug of Venyovsky District

=== Tver Oblast ===
As of 2012, eleven rural localities in Tver Oblast bear this name:

- Zhukovo, Andreapolsky District, Tver Oblast, a village in Toropatskoye Rural Settlement of Andreapolsky District
- Zhukovo, Bologovsky District, Tver Oblast, a village in Kaftinskoye Rural Settlement of Bologovsky District
- Zhukovo, Firovsky District, Tver Oblast, a village in Velikooktyabrskoye Rural Settlement of Firovsky District
- Zhukovo, Kashinsky District, Tver Oblast, a village in Farafonovskoye Rural Settlement of Kashinsky District
- Zhukovo, Kesovogorsky District, Tver Oblast, a village in Nikolskoye Rural Settlement of Kesovogorsky District
- Zhukovo, Oleninsky District, Tver Oblast, a village in Glazkovskoye Rural Settlement of Oleninsky District
- Zhukovo, Ostashkovsky District, Tver Oblast, a village in Khitinskoye Rural Settlement of Ostashkovsky District
- Zhukovo, Rzhevsky District, Tver Oblast, a village in Khoroshevo Rural Settlement of Rzhevsky District
- Zhukovo, Vesyegonsky District, Tver Oblast, a village in Lyubegoshchinskoye Rural Settlement of Vesyegonsky District
- Zhukovo, Vyshnevolotsky District, Tver Oblast, a settlement in Yesenovichskoye Rural Settlement of Vyshnevolotsky District
- Zhukovo, Zubtsovsky District, Tver Oblast, a village in Knyazhyegorskoye Rural Settlement of Zubtsovsky District

=== Vologda Oblast ===
As of 2012, six rural localities in Vologda Oblast bear this name:

- Zhukovo, Kichmengsko-Gorodetsky District, Vologda Oblast, a village in Pyzhugsky Selsoviet of Kichmengsko-Gorodetsky District
- Zhukovo, Ust-Kubinsky District, Vologda Oblast, a village in Nikolsky Selsoviet of Ust-Kubinsky District
- Zhukovo, Ustyuzhensky District, Vologda Oblast, a village in Soshnevsky Selsoviet of Ustyuzhensky District
- Zhukovo, Velikoustyugsky District, Vologda Oblast, a village in Verkhneshardengsky Selsoviet of Velikoustyugsky District
- Zhukovo, Bereznikovsky Selsoviet, Vologodsky District, Vologda Oblast, a village in Bereznikovsky Selsoviet of Vologodsky District
- Zhukovo, Staroselsky Selsoviet, Vologodsky District, Vologda Oblast, a village in Staroselsky Selsoviet of Vologodsky District

=== Yaroslavl Oblast ===
As of 2012, four rural localities in Yaroslavl Oblast bear this name:

- Zhukovo, Myshkinsky District, Yaroslavl Oblast, a village in Rozhdestvensky Rural Okrug of Myshkinsky District
- Zhukovo, Nekouzsky District, Yaroslavl Oblast, a village in Nekouzsky Rural Okrug of Nekouzsky District
- Zhukovo, Bekrenevsky Rural Okrug, Yaroslavsky District, Yaroslavl Oblast, a village in Bekrenevsky Rural Okrug of Yaroslavsky District
- Zhukovo, Pestretsovsky Rural Okrug, Yaroslavsky District, Yaroslavl Oblast, a village in Pestretsovsky Rural Okrug of Yaroslavsky District

== Alternative names ==
- Zhukovo, alternative name of Zhukovka, a village in Tsarevskoye Rural Settlement of Pushkinsky District in Moscow Oblast; 56°3′N 37°59′E
- Zhukovo, alternative name of Zhukova, a village in Stanovskoy Selsoviet of Orlovsky District in Oryol Oblast; 53°10′N 36°17′E
- Zhukovo, alternative name of Zhukovskoye, a selo in Zhukovskoye Rural Settlement of Peschanokopsky District in Rostov Oblast; 46°5′N 41°22′E
- Zhukovo, alternative name of Zhukov, a khutor in Zadono-Kagalnitskoye Rural Settlement of Semikarakorsky District in Rostov Oblast; 47°31′N 41°12′E

== See also ==
- Zhukov (disambiguation)
- Zhukovsky (disambiguation)
- Zhukovka
- Žukovo
