= Zhukovka =

Zhukovka (Russian: Жуковка) is the name of several inhabited localities in Russia.

Urban localities

- Zhukovka, Bryansk Oblast, a town in Zhukovsky District of Bryansk Oblast; 53°32′N 33°44′E

Rural localities

- Zhukovka, Altai Krai, a selo in Pavlozavodskoy Selsoviet of Pavlovsky District in Altai Krai; 53°12′N 82°59′E
- Zhukovka, Lukhsky District, Ivanovo Oblast, a village in Lukhsky District of Ivanovo Oblast
- Zhukovka, Yuryevetsky District, Ivanovo Oblast, a selo in Yuryevetsky District of Ivanovo Oblast
- Zhukovka, Kaliningrad Oblast, a settlement in Pogranichny Rural Okrug of Bagrationovsky District in Kaliningrad Oblast
- Zhukovka, Kostroma Oblast, a village in Voskresenskoye Settlement of Nerekhtsky District in Kostroma Oblast
- Zhukovka, Krasnoyarsk Krai, a selo in Zhukovsky Selsoviet of Kozulsky District in Krasnoyarsk Krai
- Zhukovka, Republic of Mordovia, a selo in Zhukovsky Selsoviet of Zubovo-Polyansky District in the Republic of Mordovia
- Zhukovka, Moscow, a village in Pervomayskoye Settlement of the federal city of Moscow
- Zhukovka, Dmitrovsky District, Moscow Oblast, a village under the administrative jurisdiction of the Town of Dmitrov in Dmitrovsky District of Moscow Oblast
- Zhukovka, Odintsovsky District, Moscow Oblast, a village in Barvikhinskoye Rural Settlement of Odintsovsky District in Moscow Oblast
- Zhukovka, Pushkinsky District, Moscow Oblast, a village in Tsarevskoye Rural Settlement of Pushkinsky District in Moscow Oblast
- Zhukovka, Volokolamsky District, Moscow Oblast, a village in Ostashevskoye Rural Settlement of Volokolamsky District in Moscow Oblast
- Zhukovka, Nizhny Novgorod Oblast, a village in Pamyat Parizhskoy Kommuny Selsoviet under the administrative jurisdiction of the town of oblast significance of Bor in Nizhny Novgorod Oblast
- Zhukovka, Omsk Oblast, a village in Novosanzharovsky Rural Okrug of Russko-Polyansky District in Omsk Oblast
- Zhukovka, Oryol Oblast, a village in Bolshekulikovsky Selsoviet of Orlovsky District in Oryol Oblast
- Zhukovka, Ryazan Oblast, a village in Yermo-Nikolayevsky Rural Okrug of Pitelinsky District in Ryazan Oblast
- Zhukovka, Smolensk Oblast, a village in Besedkovskoye Rural Settlement of Yershichsky District in Smolensk Oblast
- Zhukovka, Nerlskoye Rural Settlement, Kalyazinsky District, Tver Oblast, a village in Nerlskoye Rural Settlement of Kalyazinsky District in Tver Oblast
- Zhukovka, Semendyayevskoye Rural Settlement, Kalyazinsky District, Tver Oblast, a village in Semendyayevskoye Rural Settlement of Kalyazinsky District in Tver Oblast
- Zhukovka, Kimrsky District, Tver Oblast, a village in Privolzhskoye Rural Settlement of Kimrsky District in Tver Oblast
- Zhukovka, Ulyanovsk Oblast, a village in Papuzinsky Rural Okrug of Bazarnosyzgansky District in Ulyanovsk Oblast
- Zhukovka, Vladimir Oblast, a village in Sudogodsky District of Vladimir Oblast

== See also ==
- Zhukov (disambiguation)
- Zhukovo
- Zhukovsky (disambiguation)
