= Berezhki =

Berezhki may refer to the following villages in Russia:

- Berezhki, Bryansk Oblast
- Berezhki, Kaliningrad Oblast
- Berezhki, Kirzhachsky District, Vladimir Oblast
- Berezhki, Sudogodsky District, Vladimir Oblast
