= Zhukov (surname) =

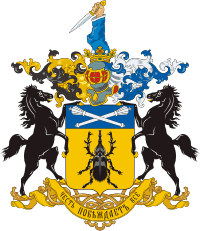
Coat of arms of the Zhukov family

The Zhukov family (Russian: Жуков) is an old Russian noble family, known since the 15th century. Based on a family legend, they trace their ancestry from Constantinople and came to Russia as entourage of Byzantine princess, Anna Porphyrogenita, fifth wife of Vladimir the Great.

== Surname ==
Zhukov or Zhukova (feminine) is also a common Russian surname, derived from the word "жук" (beetle, bug).

== Notable people ==
- Anastasia Zhukova (born 1974), Russian politician
- Alexander Zhukov, multiple people
- Anatoly Zhukov (1901–?), Soviet forestry expert and academician
- Boris Zhukov, professional wrestling name of Jim Barrell
- Dasha Zhukova (born 1981), Russian fashion designer
- Gavriil Zhukov (1899–1957), Soviet Naval Commander during World War II
- Georgy Zhukov (footballer) (born 1994), Kazakh footballer
- Georgy Zhukov (1896–1974), Soviet military commander and politician
- Igor Zhukov (1936–2018), Russian pianist, conductor and sound engineer
- Inna Zhukova (born 1986), Belarusian individual rhythmic gymnast
- Ivan Zhukov (1880–1949), Russian chemist
- Ivan Yefimovich Zhukov (1934–2021), military pilot and Hero of the Soviet Union
- Klim Zhukov (born 1977), Russian medievalist historian, science fiction author, vlogger, and historical reenactor
- Sergeant Sergei Zhukov, recurring character in the television series JAG
- Maria Zhukova (1804–1855), Russian writer
- Mikhail Zhukov (disambiguation), several people
- Mykyta Zhukov (born 1995), Ukrainian football player
- Natalia Zhukova (born 1979), Ukrainian Woman Grandmaster of chess
- Natalya Zhukova, several people
- Rimma Zhukova (1925–1999), Russian speed skater
- Sergei Nikolayevich Zhukov (born 1967), Soviet and Russian footballer
- Sergei Zhukov (ice hockey) (born 1975), Russian ice hockey player
- Sergey Zhukov (born 1976), musician with the group Ruki Vverh!
- Vasily Zhukov (born 1947), member of the Russian Academy of Sciences
- Vladimir Zhukov (born 1972), Russian serial killer
- Yegor Zhukov (born 1998), Russian political activist, journalist and radio host
- Yevgeni Zhukov (1950–1990), Soviet footballer
- Yuri Zhukov (historian) (1938–2023), Russian historian
- Yuri Zhukov (politician) (1908–1991), journalist, editor and observer of the newspaper Pravda, third chairman of the Soviet Peace Committee

== See also ==
- Zhukovsky (surname)
- Żukowski
