= Zhukovsky =

Zhukovsky (masculine), Zhukovskaya (feminine), or Zhukovskoye (neuter) may refer to:

== People ==
- Zhukovsky (surname) (or Zhukovskaya)
- Żukowski

== Places ==
- Zhukovsky District, several districts in Russia
- Zhukovsky Urban Okrug, a municipal division which Zhukovsky City Under Oblast Jurisdiction in Moscow Oblast, Russia is incorporated as
- Zhukovsky Urban Administrative Okrug, an administrative division which the town of Zhukovka and seven rural localities in Zhukovsky District of Bryansk Oblast, Russia are incorporated as
- Zhukovskoye Urban Settlement, a municipal formation which Zhukovsky Urban Administrative Okrug in Zhukovsky District of Bryansk Oblast, Russia is incorporated as
- Zhukovsky (inhabited locality) (Zhukovskaya, Zhukovskoye), several inhabited localities in Russia

== Other ==
- Zhukovsky International Airport in Zhukovsky, Moscow Oblast, Russia
- Zhukovsky air base, an airfield used by the Gromov Flight Research Institute in Moscow Oblast, Russia
- Zhukovsky (film), a 1950 film by Vsevolod Pudovkin

== See also ==
- Zhukov (disambiguation)
- Zhukovka, several inhabited localities in Russia
- Zhukovo, several rural localities in Russia
