= Zhukovsky District =

Location of Bryansk Oblast in Russia

Location of Kaluga Oblast in Russia

Zhukovsky District is the name of several administrative and municipal districts in Russia:

- Zhukovsky District, Bryansk Oblast, an administrative and municipal district of Bryansk Oblast
- Zhukovsky District, Kaluga Oblast, an administrative and municipal district of Kaluga Oblast

== Historical names ==
- Zhukovsky District, the name of Dregelsky District of Leningrad Oblast in 1927–1931.

== See also ==
- Zhukovsky (disambiguation)
