= Kurtamysh =

Kurtamysh may refer to:

- Kurtamysh Urban Settlement, a municipal formation which Kurtamysh Town Under District Jurisdiction in Kurtamyshsky District of Kurgan Oblast, Russia is incorporated as
- Kurtamysh (inhabited locality), several inhabited localities in Kurgan Oblast, Russia
- Kurtamysh River, a river in Kurgan Oblast, Russia on which the town of Kurtamysh stands
