= Zhukov (inhabited locality) =

Zhukov (Russian: Жуков) is the name of several inhabited localities in Russia.

== Urban localities ==
- Zhukov, Kaluga Oblast, a town in Zhukovsky District of Kaluga Oblast

== Rural localities ==
- Zhukov, Kursk Oblast, a khutor in Romanovsky Selsoviet of Khomutovsky District of Kursk Oblast
- Zhukov, Rostov Oblast, a khutor in Zadono-Kagalnitskoye Rural Settlement of Semikarakorsky District of Rostov Oblast
