= Zukovsky =

Zukovsky or Zukofsky may refer to:

== People ==
- Louis Zukofsky (1904–1978), American poet
- Michele Zukovsky, American clarinetist
- Paul Zukofsky (1943–2017), American violinist and conductor

== Fictional characters ==
- Valentin Zukovsky, a fictional character whom actor Robbie Coltrane played in two James Bond films: GoldenEye and The World is Not Enough

== See also ==
- Zhukovsky (surname)
