= Kurtamysh (inhabited locality) =

Kurtamysh (Russian: Куртамыш) is the name of several inhabited localities in Kurgan Oblast, Russia.

Urban localities

- Kurtamysh (town), a town in Kurtamyshsky District

Rural localities

- Kurtamysh (rural locality), a village in Rakovsky Selsoviet of Ketovsky District
