= Zhukov (disambiguation) =

The name Zhukov often refers to Georgy Zhukov (1896–1974), a Soviet military leader. It may also refer to:

- Zhukov (surname)
- Zhukov (inhabited locality), name of several inhabited localities in Russia
- 2132 Zhukov, an asteroid named after Georgy Zhukov
- USS Zhukov (NCC-62136), a Federation Ambassador class starship in the fictional Star Trek universe, named after Georgy Zhukov

== See also ==
- Žukov (disambiguation)
- Zhukovo
- Zhukovsky (disambiguation)
