= Tomáš Poznar =

Czech footballer

Personal information
- Date of birth: 27 September 1988 (age 38)
- Place of birth: Gottwaldov, Czechoslovakia
- Height: 1.94 m (6 ft 4 in)
- Position: Forward

Team information
- Current team: Zlín
- Number: 88

Youth career
- 1997–2008: Zlín

Senior career*
Years	Team	Apps	(Gls)
2008–2016	Zlín	151	(47)
2008–2009	→ Vítkovice (loan)	16	(3)
2013	→ Spartak Trnava (loan)	9	(2)
2016–2019	Viktoria Plzeň	18	(0)
2017–2018	→ Baník Ostrava (loan)	27	(3)
2018–2019	→ Zlín (loan)	22	(8)
2019–2022	Zlín	77	(24)
2022–2023	Bruk-Bet Termalica	57	(13)
2024	Spartak Trnava	13	(1)
2024–	Zlín	61	(14)

International career
2020	Czech Republic	1	(0)
- * Club domestic league appearances and goals as of 27 May 2026

Tomáš Poznar (born 27 September 1988) is a Czech professional footballer who plays as a forward for Zlín.

== Club career ==
=== Zlín ===
Poznar is a graduate of the FC Zlín academy. He made it into the first team before the 2008–09 season. He then went on a one-year loan to FC Vítkovice. In the summer of 2013, he was training with the then-newcomer to the First League, 1. SC Znojmo, but the transfer did not take place due to a thigh injury. During the autumn part of the 2013/14 season, he went on loan to the Slovak club Spartak Trnava, from where he returned to Zlín in December 2013.

In the 2nd round of the 2014–15 Czech Post Cup against SK Hanácká Slavia Kroměříž, he replaced the sent off Polish goalkeeper Krzysztof Żukowski in the final penalty shootout and saved three of the opponents' attempts. He then converted the decisive penalty himself, Zlín won the shootout 8–7 and advanced to the third round.

Poznar experienced promotion to the top flight with Zlín in the 2014–15 season. He scored his first goal in the top flight on 15 August 2015, when he decided Zlín's 2–0 victory over FC Baník Ostrava.

=== Viktoria Plzeň ===
On 30 August 2016, he transferred to FC Viktoria Plzeň and signed a three-year contract club such as Slovan Liberec were also interested in signing him. He was given the shirt number 18.

==== Loan to Baník Ostrava ====
On 24 June 2017, he left Plzeň on a one-year loan to Baník Ostrava. He also played there under the wing of Bohumil Páník, who also managed him in Zlín at the time. He scored three goals there and helped Baník from relegation from the league with his performances.

=== Return to Zlín ===
At the beginning of the 2018–19 season, he returned to Zlín on loan with an option to buy. In the summer of 2019, he left Plzeň for Zlín permanently after his contract expired.

=== Spartak Trnava ===
On 10 January 2024, it was announced that Poznar would be joining Spartak Trnava, returning to the club for a second time after over 10 years. He made his debut for the club in a 1–0 loss away from home against MFK Ružomberok, starting the game and playing the full 90 minutes. At his time with Spartak, he played 13 times, scoring 1 goal.

=== Zlín ===
On 20 June 2024, Poznar signed a contract with Zlín as a free agent.
