= Zhukovsky (inhabited locality) =

Index inhabited places associated with the same name

Zhukovsky (Russian: Жуковский; masculine), Zhukovskaya (Жуковская; feminine), or Zhukovskoye (Жуковское; neuter) is the name of several inhabited localities in Russia.

== Urban ==
- Zhukovsky, Moscow Oblast, a city under the oblast jurisdiction in Moscow Oblast

== Rural ==
- Zhukovsky, Chelyabinsk Oblast, a settlement in Stepnoy Selsoviet of Verkhneuralsky District of Chelyabinsk Oblast
- Zhukovsky, Oryol Oblast, a settlement in Bolshekolchevsky Selsoviet of Kromskoy District of Oryol Oblast
- Zhukovsky, Stavropol Krai, a khutor in Novomayaksky Selsoviet of Novoselitsky District of Stavropol Krai
- Zhukovsky, Nikitinsky Selsoviet, Kumylzhensky District, Volgograd Oblast, a khutor in Nikitinsky Selsoviet of Kumylzhensky District of Volgograd Oblast
- Zhukovsky, Sulyayevsky Selsoviet, Kumylzhensky District, Volgograd Oblast, a khutor in Sulyayevsky Selsoviet of Kumylzhensky District of Volgograd Oblast
- Zhukovskoye, a selo in Zhukovskoye Rural Settlement of Peschanokopsky District of Rostov Oblast
- Zhukovskaya, Ivanovo Oblast, a village in Puchezhsky District of Ivanovo Oblast
- Zhukovskaya, Rostov Oblast, a stanitsa in Zhukovskoye Rural Settlement of Dubovsky District of Rostov Oblast
- Zhukovskaya, Kharovsky District, Vologda Oblast, a village in Kumzersky Selsoviet of Kharovsky District of Vologda Oblast
- Zhukovskaya, Lokhotsky Selsoviet, Tarnogsky District, Vologda Oblast, a village in Lokhotsky Selsoviet of Tarnogsky District of Vologda Oblast
- Zhukovskaya, Shebengsky Selsoviet, Tarnogsky District, Vologda Oblast, a village in Shebengsky Selsoviet of Tarnogsky District of Vologda Oblast

== See also ==
- Zhukovsky (disambiguation)
