= Nikolay Zhukovsky =

Nikolay Zhukovsky may refer to:

- Nikolay Zhukovsky (revolutionary) (1833–1895), Russian revolutionary
- Nikolay Zhukovsky (scientist) (1847–1921), Russian scientist

== See also ==
- Zhukovsky (disambiguation)
