= Berezhki, Bryansk Oblast =

Berezhki Бережки
- Village
- Location within Bryansk Oblast Location within Russia
- Coordinates: 53°40′N 33°49′E
- Country: Russia
- Region: Bryansk Oblast
- District: Zhukovsky District
- Time zone: UTC+3:00

Berezhki (Russian: Бережки) is a rural locality (a village) in Zhukovsky District, Bryansk Oblast, Russia. The population was 17 as of 2010. There is 1 street.

== Geography ==
Berezhki is located 19 km north of Zhukovka (the district's administrative centre) by road. Priyutino is the nearest rural locality.
