= Žukauskas =

- Lithuanian surname
- m.: Žukauskas
- f.: (unmarried): Žukauskaitė
- f.: (married): Žukauskienė
- f.: (short): Žukauskė
- Related names: Zhukovsky, Zukowski

Žukauskas is the masculine form of a Lithuanian family name. It is a Lithuanized form of a Polish counterpart: Żukowski or Russian counterpart: Zhukovsky. These derive from the Slavic word zhuk for "bug". Its feminine forms are: Žukauskienė (married woman or widow) and Žukauskaitė (unmarried woman).

The surname may refer to:

- Eurelijus Žukauskas, basketball player of Lithuania men's national basketball team
- Mindaugas Žukauskas, basketball player of Lithuanian national basketball team
- Silvestras Žukauskas, general in the Russian army, and later in his native Lithuania, after it regained its independence in 1918
- Antanas Žukauskas, Lithuanian writer, dramatist
