= Anatoly Kirpichnikov =

Prominent Russian historian and archeologist

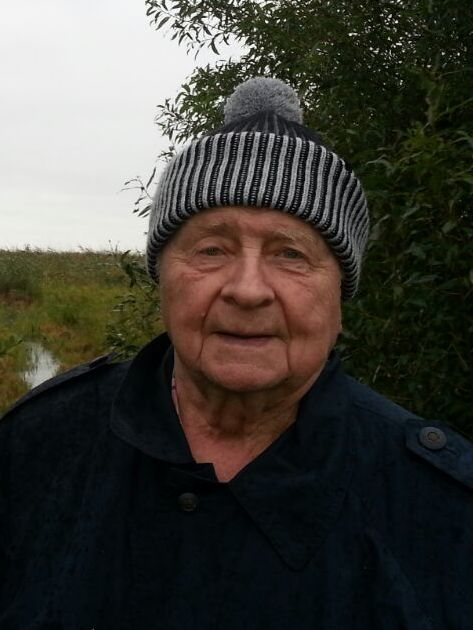
- Born: 25 June 1929; Leningrad, RSFSR, USSR
- Died: 16 October 2020 (aged 91); Saint-Petersburg, Russia
- Citizenship: USSR, Russia

Academic background
- Education: Leningrad State University

Academic work
- Discipline: archeologist, historian
- Sub-discipline: Medieval history
- Institutions: Russian Academy of Sciences
- Notable students: Klim Zhukov

Anatoly Nikolaevich Kirpichnikov (25 June 1929 – 16 October 2020) was a Soviet and Russian archaeologist and historian. In 1991 he was declared an honored scientist of the RSFSR, and in 2013 an honorary citizen of Leningrad Oblast.

== Biography ==
Anatoly Nikolaevich Kirpichnikov was born on June 25, 1929 in the city of Leningrad, now the city of St. Petersburg. During the blockade, his mother worked as a doctor at plant No. 181 and died during artillery shelling in July 1943.

He graduated from the Faculty of History of Leningrad State University. Since 1955 he worked at the Institute of the History of Material Culture of the USSR Academy of Sciences.

In 1963, at the Leningrad branch of the Institute of Archeology of the USSR Academy of Sciences, he defended his candidate’s thesis “Russian melee weapons (X-XIII centuries)”, and in 1975 at the Institute of Archeology of the USSR Academy of Sciences, he presented his doctoral dissertation “Military Affairs of Rus' in the 9th-15th centuries.”.

He was a head of excavations in Staraya Ladoga. Member of the scientific council of the Russian Military Historical Society.

The main range of scientific interests were history, archeology, culture and architecture of Ancient Rus' and neighboring countries.He is an author of more than 650 scientific works, including 16 monographs.

On November 25, 2009, he publicly opposed the construction of the Okhta Center tower in St. Petersburg.

Anatoly Kirpichnikov died on October 16, 2020. He was buried at the Alekseevskoye cemetery in the village of Staraya Ladoga, Staraya Ladoga rural settlement, Volkhov district, Leningrad region. A monument was erected on his grave.
