= Żukowski =

Żukowski (feminine: Żukowska) is a Polish surname. It is a location surname deriving from Żukow. It is related to the following surnames in other languages:

Language	Masculine	Feminine
Polish	Żukowski	Żukowska
Belarusian (Romanization)	Жукоўскі (Zhukouski, Zhukowski, Žukoǔski)	Жукоўская (Zhukouskaya, Žukoǔskaja)
Czech	Žukovský	Žukovská
Latvian	Žukovskis	
Lithuanian	Žukauskas	Žukauskienė (married); Žukauskaitė (unmarried)
Russian (Romanization)	Жуковский (Zhukovsky, Zhukovskiy, Žukovskij)	Жуковская (Zhukovskaya, Zhukovskaia, Žukovskaja)
Ukrainian (Romanization)	Жуковський (Zhukovskyi, Zhukovskyy, Žukovskyj)	Жуковська (Zhukovska, Žukovska)

== People ==
- Anna Maria Żukowska (born 1983), Polish politician
- Bartosz Żukowski, Polish actor
- Charles Zukowski (born 1959), American engineer
- Christine Zukowski (born 1989), American figure skater
- Feliks Żukowski (1904–1976), Polish actor
- Henryk Żukowski (1925–1972), Polish politician and civil servant
- Jan Żukowski (born 1947), Polish sprint canoer
- Krzysztof Żukowski (born 1985), Polish footballer
- Marek Żukowski (born 1952), Polish theoretical physicist
- Mateusz Żukowski (born 2001), Polish football player
- Otton Mieczysław Żukowski (1867–1942), Polish composer
- Robert K. Zukowski (1930–2015), American politician
- Sharon Zukowski (1954–2015), American novelist
- Wojciech Żukowski (born 1964), Polish politician

== See also ==
- Rolf Zuckowski (born 1947), German singer-songwriter
