= Berezhki, Kirzhachsky District, Vladimir Oblast =

Berezhki Бережки
- Village
- Location within Vladimir Oblast Location within Russia
- Coordinates: 56°08′N 38°40′E
- Country: Russia
- Region: Vladimir Oblast
- District: Kirzhachsky District
- Time zone: UTC+3:00

Berezhki (Russian: Бережки) is a rural locality (a village) in Filippovskoye Rural Settlement, Kirzhachsky District, Vladimir Oblast, Russia. The population was 9 as of 2010. There are 37 streets.

== Geography ==
Berezhki is located on the Sherna River, 16 km west of Kirzhach (the district's administrative centre) by road. Sergiyevka is the nearest rural locality.
