= Zhukovka, Altai Krai =

Zhukovka Жуковка
- Selo
- Location within Altai Krai Location within Russia
- Coordinates: 53°12′N 82°58′E
- Country: Russia
- Region: Altai Krai
- District: Pavlovsky District
- Time zone: UTC+7:00

Zhukovka (Russian: Жуковка) is a rural locality (a selo) in Pavlozavodsky Selsoviet, Pavlovsky District, Altai Krai, Russia. The population was 278 as of 2013. There are 3 streets.

== Geography ==
Zhukovka is located 19 km south of Pavlovsk (the district's administrative centre) by road. Ozyorny is the nearest rural locality.
