= Zhukovo, Velikoustyugsky District, Vologda Oblast =

Zhukovo Жуково
- Village
- Location within Vologda Oblast Location within Russia
- Coordinates: 60°23′N 46°18′E
- Country: Russia
- Region: Vologda Oblast
- District: Velikoustyugsky District
- Time zone: UTC+3:00

Zhukovo (Russian: Жуково) is a rural locality (a village) in Verkhneshardengskoye Rural Settlement, Velikoustyugsky District, Vologda Oblast, Russia. The population was 7 as of 2002.

== Geography ==
Zhukovo is located 52 km south of Veliky Ustyug (the district's administrative centre) by road. Verkhnyaya Shardenga is the nearest rural locality.
