= Zhukovo, Belgorod Oblast =

Zhukovo Жуково
- Selo
- Location within Belgorod Oblast Location within Russia
- Coordinates: 50°25′N 38°38′E
- Country: Russia
- Region: Belgorod Oblast
- District: Alexeyevsky District
- Time zone: UTC+3:00

Zhukovo (Russian: Жу́ково) is a rural locality (a selo) and the administrative center of Zhukovskoye Rural Settlement, Alexeyevsky District, Belgorod Oblast, Russia. The population was 327 as of 2010. There are 3 streets.

== Geography ==
Zhukovo is located 34 km south of Alexeyevka (the district's administrative centre) by road. Bublikovo is the nearest rural locality.
