= Zhukovo, Kichmengsko-Gorodetsky District, Vologda Oblast =

Zhukovo Жуково
- Village
- Location within Vologda Oblast Location within Russia
- Coordinates: 60°02′N 45°53′E
- Country: Russia
- Region: Vologda Oblast
- District: Kichmengsko-Gorodetsky District
- Time zone: UTC+3:00

Zhukovo (Russian: Жуково) is a rural locality (a village) in Kichmengskoye Rural Settlement, Kichmengsko-Gorodetsky District, Vologda Oblast, Russia. The population was 20 as of 2002.

== Geography ==
Zhukovo is located 11 km northeast of Kichmengsky Gorodok (the district's administrative centre) by road. Zasosenye is the nearest rural locality.
