= Zhukovo, Ustyuzhensky District, Vologda Oblast =

Zhukovo Жуково
- Village
- Location within Vologda Oblast Location within Russia
- Coordinates: 58°46′N 36°43′E
- Country: Russia
- Region: Vologda Oblast
- District: Ustyuzhensky District
- Time zone: UTC+3:00

Zhukovo (Russian: Жуково) is a rural locality (a village) in Soshnevskoye Rural Settlement, Ustyuzhensky District, Vologda Oblast, Russia. The population was 88 as of 2002.

== Geography ==
Zhukovo is located 20 km (12 mi) southeast of Ustyuzhna (the district's administrative centre) by road. Zyablikovo is the nearest rural locality.
