= Zhukovo, Palekhsky District, Ivanovo Oblast =

Zhukovo Жуково
- Village
- Location within Ivanovo Oblast Location within Russia
- Coordinates: 56°47′N 42°06′E
- Country: Russia
- Region: Ivanovo Oblast
- District: Palekhsky District
- Time zone: UTC+3:00

Zhukovo (Russian: Жуково) is a rural locality (a village) in Palekhsky District, Ivanovo Oblast, Russia. Population: 40 (2010 census);

== Geography ==
This rural locality is located 15 kilometres (9.3 mi) from Palekh (the district's administrative centre), 73 kilometres (45 mi) from Ivanovo (capital of Ivanovo Oblast) and 296 kilometres (184 mi) from Moscow. Khotenovo is the nearest rural locality.
