= Klim Zhukov =

Russian author and historical reenactor (born 1977)

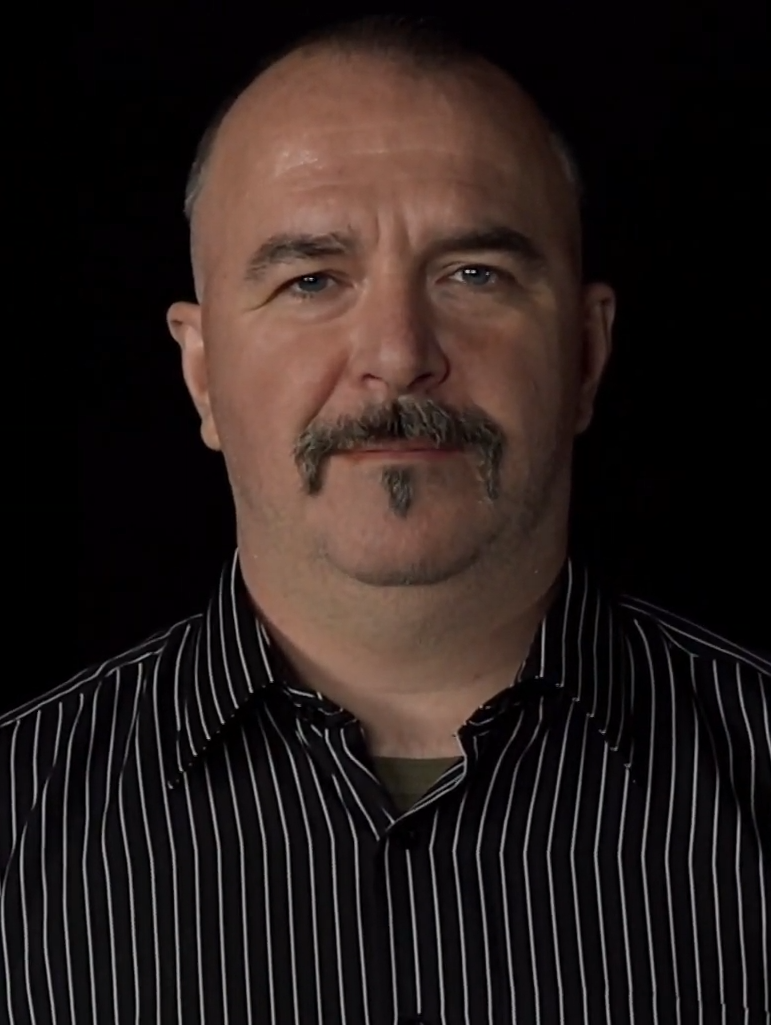
- Born: March 29, 1977; Saint Petersburg
- Alma mater: Saint Petersburg State Institute of History; Institute for the History of Material Culture
- Occupation: Writer, historian, video blogger, military historian, science fiction writer
- Employer: Hermitage Museum

Klim Zhukov (Russian: Клим Александрович Жуков; born 1977, in Leningrad) is a Russian author, vlogger, and historical reenactor. He is a medievalist historian and science fiction author. He is also involved in historical reenactment. He is a bestselling author. In a survey conducted in 2019, he entered the top 10 trust rating in the Russian Internet. He collaborates with Dmitry Puchkov.

== Early life and career ==
He was named after Kliment Voroshilov.

He graduated from the Faculty of History at Saint Petersburg State University in 1999. He also was a postgraduate student, but did not complete his dissertation. His dissertation advisor was Anatoly Kirpichnikov. Zhukov is listed as a student of Professor Kirpichnikov.

From 1999 to 2008, he worked at the Hermitage Museum.

He taught at the Russian Christian Humanitarian Academy.

Since 2002 he has been working in the film industry. He consulted on the film Alexander.

He has published a number of books. As a science-fiction writer he made his debut in 2010 with the Fantastique novel "Soldier of the Emperor" (published by Eksmo; republished in 2022). His next book was published by AST. He is a co-author with Alexander Zorich. Their books have been reviewed in the Mir Fantastiki.

He lives in Saint Petersburg.

He was criticized by Professor Vadim Dolgov.

== Worldview ==
Zhukov considers himself a Marxist and convinced materialist. In an interview about materialism, revolution and capitalism, he stated: “Everything comes from matter. If you ask me, I am a consistent materialist, I think that matter is still primary.” He adheres to materialistic views on the historical process; in a video about the history of Vladimir-Suzdalian Rus', he argued: “Now we are armed with Marx’s theory, dialectical materialism and historical materialism, and we can, firstly, study the experience of our ancestors, and, secondly, not repeat such nonsense.”

== Bibliography ==
Year	Title
2005	Западноевропейский доспех Раннего Ренессанса (co-authored with D. Korovkin)
2005	Всадники войны. Кавалерия Европы (co-authored with D. Aleksinsky et al.)
2010	Солдат императора (Эксмо)
2021	Викинги. История эпохи. 793–1066 (Foreword by Dmitry Puchkov)
2022	Инцидент
2022	Дед

The book "Экономика Российской империи" was published under his editorship in 2024.
