= Berezhki, Sudogodsky District, Vladimir Oblast =

Berezhki Бережки
- Village
- Location within Vladimir Oblast Location within Russia
- Coordinates: 55°54′N 40°51′E
- Country: Russia
- Region: Vladimir Oblast
- District: Sudogodsky District
- Time zone: UTC+3:00

Berezhki (Russian: Бережки) is a rural locality (a village) in Muromtsevskoye Rural Settlement, Sudogodsky District, Vladimir Oblast, Russia. The population was 25 as of 2010.

== Geography ==
Berezhki is located on the left bank of the Sudogda River, 5 km south of Sudogda (the district's administrative centre) by road. Bashevo is the nearest rural locality.
