= Zhukovka, Vladimir Oblast =

Zhukovka Жуковка
- Village
- Location within Vladimir Oblast Location within Russia
- Coordinates: 55°52′N 40°50′E
- Country: Russia
- Region: Vladimir Oblast
- District: Sudogodsky District
- Time zone: UTC+3:00

Zhukovka (Russian: Жуковка) is a rural locality (a village) in Muromtsevskoye Rural Settlement, Sudogodsky District, Vladimir Oblast, Russia. The population was 16 as of 2010.

== Geography ==
Zhukovka is located on the Sudogda River, 10 km south of Sudogda (the district's administrative centre) by road. Rayki is the nearest rural locality.
