= Charles Zukowski =

American electrical engineer and academic

- Education: Massachusetts Institute of Technology
- Known for: Time-division multiplexing Integrated circuits
- Awards: IBM PHD Fellowship; Presidential Young Investigator Award
- Scientific career
- Fields: Electrical engineering Computer engineering
- Workplaces: Columbia University

Charles Albert Zukowski (born August 17, 1959) is a professor and former chair of the Department of Electrical Engineering at Columbia University. Zukowski was born in Buffalo, New York. While still a student at MIT, from 1979 to 1982, Zukowski worked at the Thomas J. Watson Research Center. He received his BS in electrical engineering from the Massachusetts Institute of Technology in 1982. He received the IBM PhD Fellowship from 1982 to 1985; in 1985 he earned his PhD in electrical engineering with a thesis entitled "Design and measurement of a reconfigurable multi-microprocessor machine". The same year, he joined the faculty of Columbia University as assistant professor, and was awarded tenure in 1993. Zukowski is an active member of IEEE and was made an IEEE Fellow in 2000. Zukowski's present research focuses on VLSI circuits and integrated circuit (IC) optimization, though in the past he has published in the fields of systems biology and computer architecture.

He is the author of a book, The Bounding Approach to VLSI Circuit Simulation. The National Science Foundation awarded Zukowski the Presidential Young Investigator Award for his work on bounding integrated circuit behavior in 1987. He holds a patent for a time-division multiplexed data transmission system which substantially improves the performance of serial data transmission. Zukowski has served on the editorial boards of several journals published by IEEE, and also reviews submissions for IEEE conferences. In addition to his involvement in IEEE, Zukowski is a current or former member of engineering honor societies including Tau Beta Pi, Eta Kappa Nu, and Sigma Xi. He is also active in the field of computer engineering and currently chairs the Department of Computer Engineering at Columbia.

== Selected bibliography ==
- Huang, Ta-Chien D.; Zukowski, Charles A. (2006). "Reconfigurable Digital/Analog Processor Array for the Simulation of Gene Regulatory Networks". 2006 49th IEEE International Midwest Symposium on Circuits and Systems. pp. 552–556. doi:10.1109/MWSCAS.2006.382122. ISBN 1-4244-0172-0. S2CID 7173000.
- Dare, Gary L.; Zukowski, Charles A. (2000). "Accuracy management for mixed-mode digital VLSI simulation". Proceedings of the 10th Great Lakes Symposium on VLSI - GLSVLSI '00. pp. 167–170. doi:10.1145/330855.331033. ISBN 1581132514. S2CID 16254968.
- Glasser, Lance A.; Zukowski, Charles A. (June 1988). "Continuous Models for Communication Density Constraints on Multiprocessor Performance". IEEE Transactions on Computers. 37 (6): 652–656. doi:10.1109/12.2204.
- Zukowski, C.A. (April 1986). "Relaxing Bounds for Linear RC Mesh Circuits". IEEE Transactions on Computer-Aided Design of Integrated Circuits and Systems. 5 (2): 305–312. doi:10.1109/TCAD.1986.1270200. S2CID 5617348.
- Zukowski, Charles A (1986). The bounding approach to VLSI circuit simulation. Hingham: Kluwer. ISBN 0-89838-176-2.
