= Berezhki, Kaliningrad Oblast =

Former settlement in Kaliningrad Oblast

Berezhki Бережки
- Rural locality
- Interactive map of Berezhki
- Location of Berezhki Berezhki (European Russia) Berezhki (Russia)
- Coordinates: 54°26′2″N 22°19′50″E
- Country: Russia

Population
  - Estimate (2021): 0 )
- Postal code: 238025

Berezhki (Russian: Бережки; Polish: Budziele) is an abandoned village in Ozyorsky District, Kaliningrad Oblast of Kaliningrad Oblast, Russia, close to the border with Poland.

Initially following World War II, in 1945, the village passed to Poland as Budziele, however, it was eventually annexed by the Soviet Union and renamed to Berezhki.
