= Zhukov, Kaluga Oblast =

Zhukov Жуков
- Town
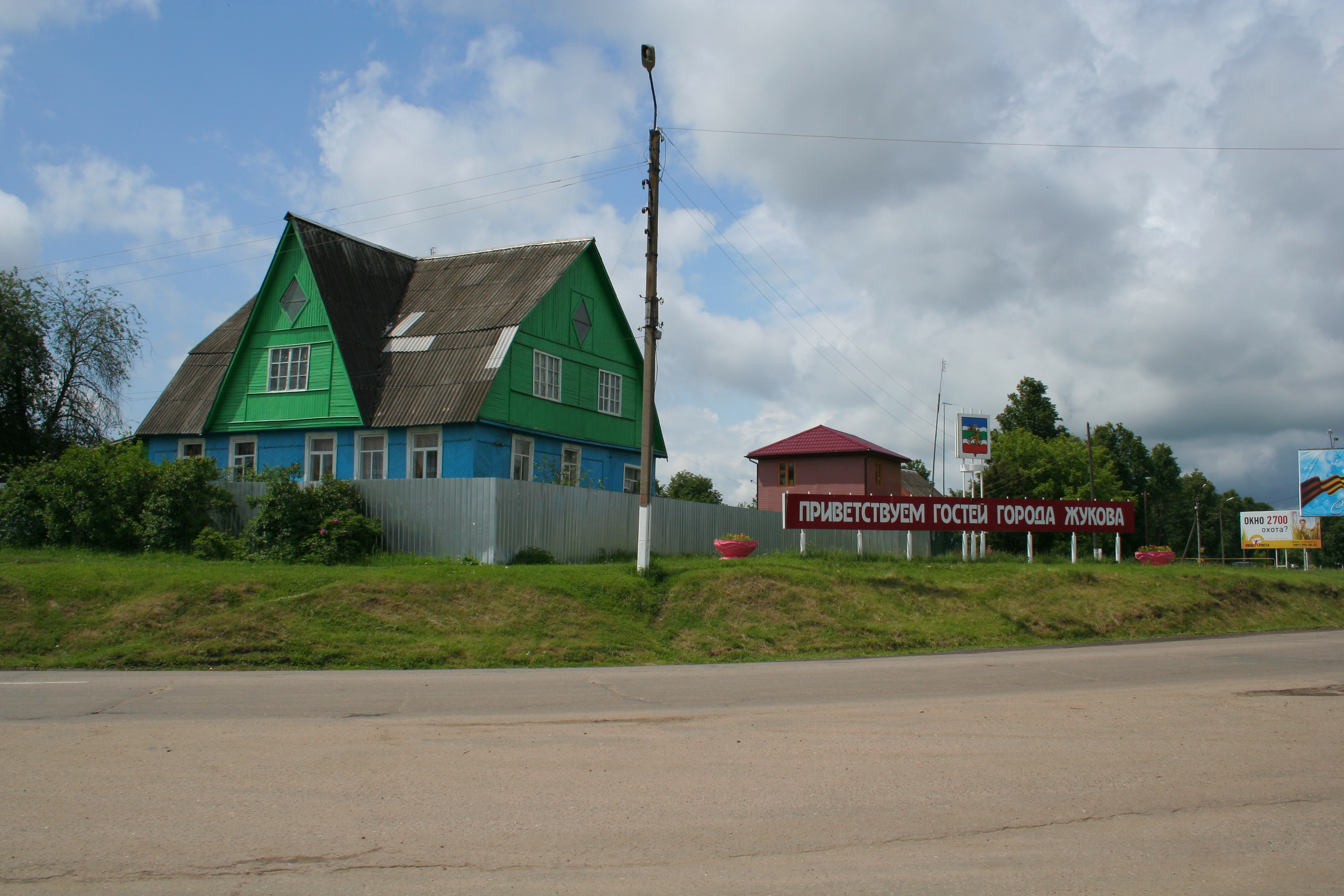
- Welcome sign at the entrance to Zhukov

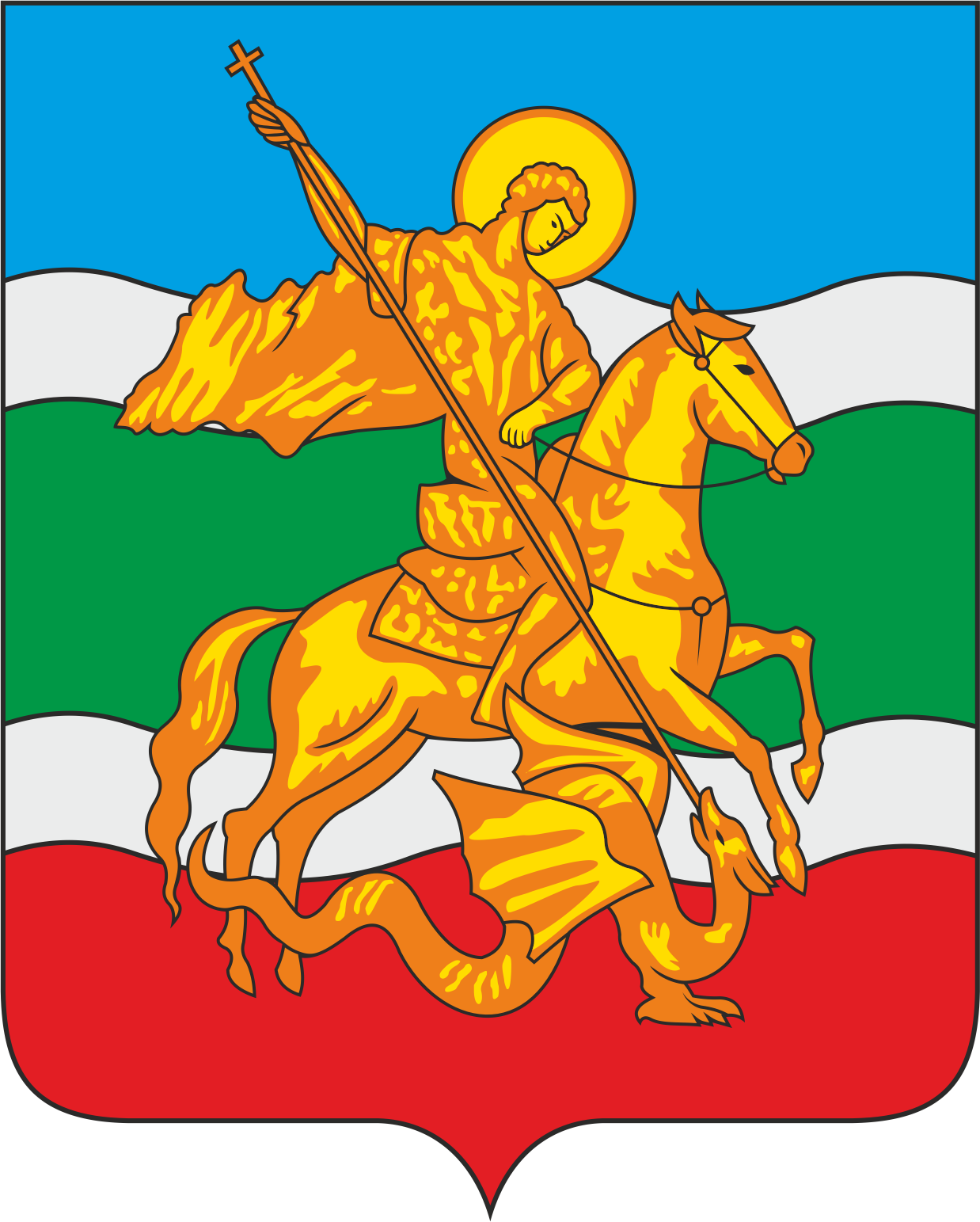
- Coat of arms
- Interactive map of Zhukov
- Location of Zhukov Zhukov (Kaluga Oblast)
- Coordinates: 55°02′N 36°45′E
- Country: Russia
- Federal subject: Kaluga Oblast
- Administrative district: Zhukovsky District
- Founded: early 17th century
- Town status since: 1996
- Elevation: 135 m (443 ft)

Population (2010 Census)
  - Total: 12,131
  - Estimate (2023): 15,656 (+29.1%)

Administrative status
  - Capital of: Zhukovsky District

Municipal status
  - Municipal district: Zhukovsky Municipal District
  - Urban settlement: Zhukov Urban Settlement
  - Capital of: Zhukovsky Municipal District, Zhukov Urban Settlement
- Time zone: UTC+3 (MSK)
- Postal code: 249190–249192
- OKTMO ID: 29613101001
- Website: my-zhukov.ru

Zhukov (Russian: Жу́ков) is a town and the administrative center of Zhukovsky District in Kaluga Oblast, Russia, located on the Ugodka River (Protva's tributary) 90 kilometers (56 mi) northwest of Kaluga, the administrative center of the oblast. Population: 16,224 (2021 census); 12,131 (2010 census); 12,306 (2002 census); 2,888 (1989 Soviet census).

== History ==
It was founded in the early 17th century. It has been known as a settlement of Ugodsky Zavod (Уго́дский Заво́д) since 1656 due to the construction of an ironworks. In 1974, it was renamed Zhukovo (Жу́ково) in honor of Georgy Zhukov, the most decorated general in Russian and Soviet military history, who was born there. In 1996, Zhukovo merged with neighboring Protva, was granted town status, and renamed Zhukov. Zhukov is in Kryukovo District in the Moscow Region and was taken briefly by Germany in 1941.

== Geography ==
=== Administrative and municipal status ===
Within the framework of administrative divisions, Zhukov serves as the administrative center of Zhukovsky District, to which it is directly subordinated. As a municipal division, the town of Zhukov is incorporated within Zhukovsky Municipal District as Zhukov Urban Settlement.

== Gallery ==
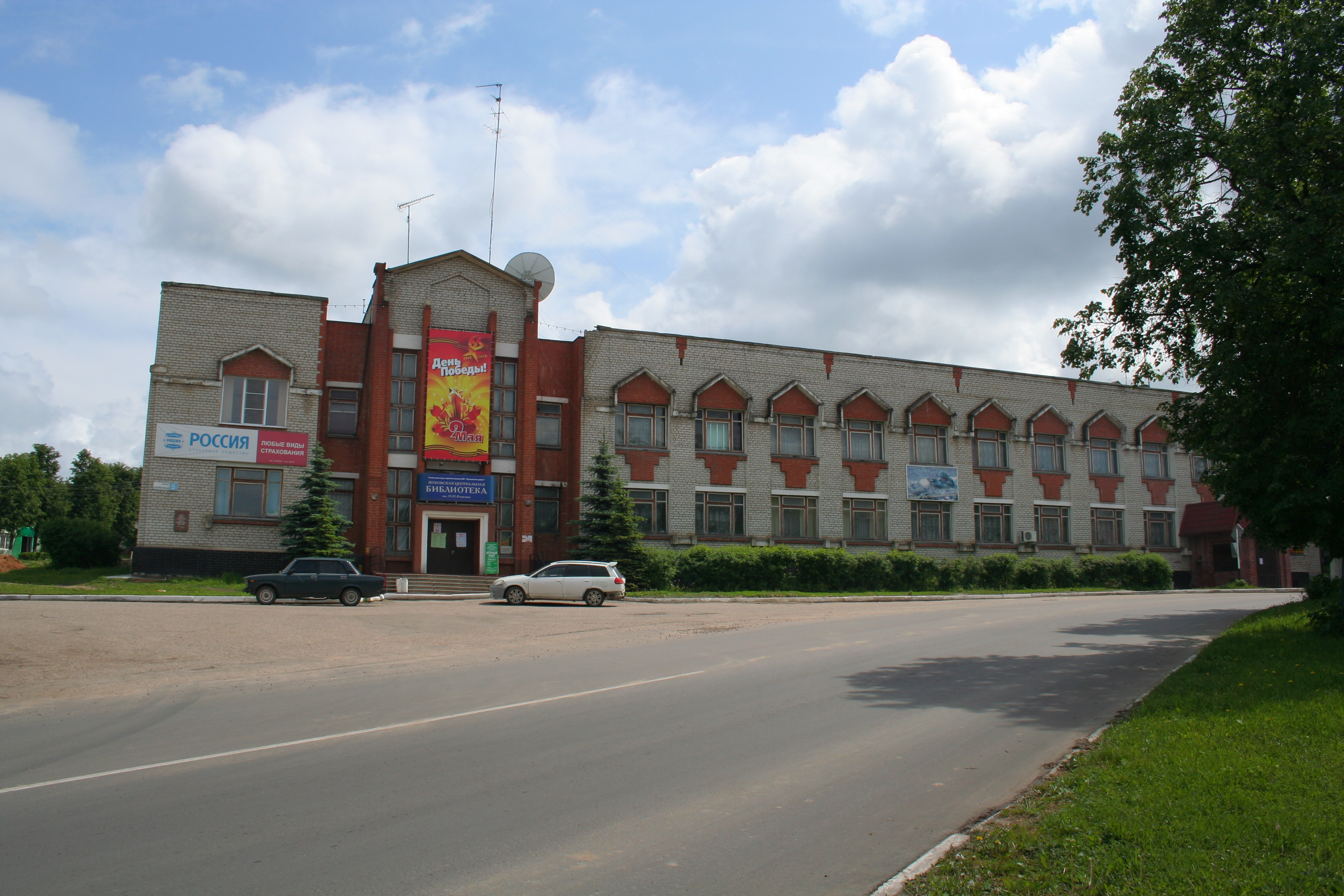
Town's library

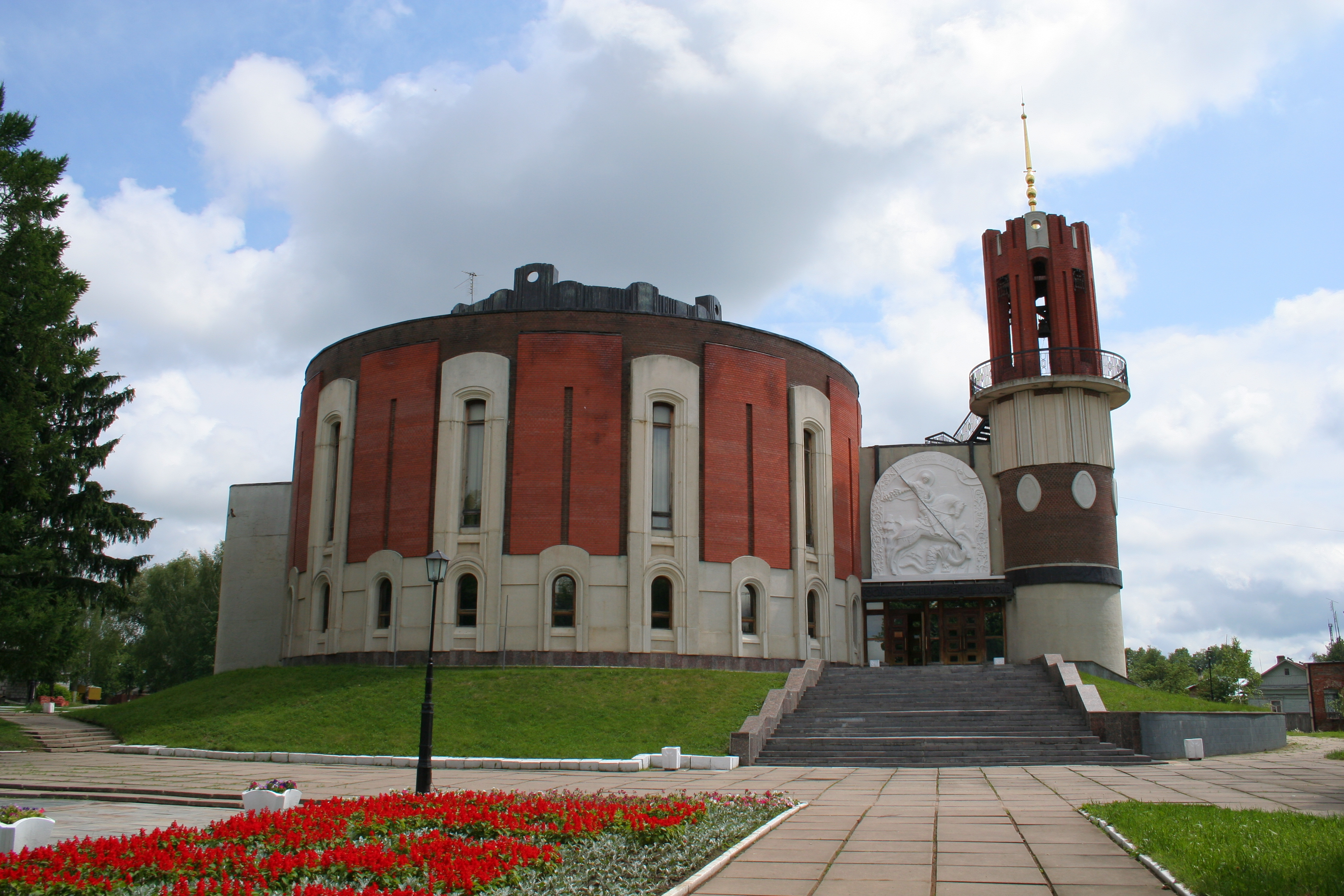
Georgy Zhukov Memorial
