= Mikhail Zhukov =

Mikhail Zhukov may refer to:

- Mikhail Zhukov (ice hockey) (born 1983) Russian hockey player
- Mikhail Zhukov (conductor) (1901—1960) Soviet conductor and composer
