= Krzysztof Żukowski =

Polish footballer and coach

Personal information
- Date of birth: 26 September 1985 (age 41)
- Place of birth: Słupsk, Poland
- Height: 1.82 m (6 ft 0 in)
- Position: Goalkeeper

Team information
- Current team: Victoria Łukowa
- Number: 1

Senior career*
Years	Team	Apps	(Gls)
2003–2005	Gryf Słupsk		
2006–2009	Górnik Łęczna	5	(0)
2006–2009	Flota Świnoujście	48	(0)
2011–2013	Śląsk Wrocław	0	(0)
2012	→ Arka Gdynia (loan)	0	(0)
2014	Fastav Zlín	5	(0)
2015	Karpaty Krosno	14	(0)
2015–2017	Motor Lublin	22	(0)
2017	Avia Świdnik	0	(0)
2017–2019	Avia Świdnik II	5	(0)
2021	Świdniczanka Świdnik	0	(0)
2021	Igros Krasnobród	4	(0)
2021	Piast Nowa Wieś	7	(0)
2022	Plantator Nienadówka	6	(0)
2022–	Victoria Łukowa	83	(0)
- * Club domestic league appearances and goals as of 08:16, 25 June 2025 (UTC)

Krzysztof Żukowski (born 26 September 1985) is a Polish professional footballer who plays as a goalkeeper for regional league club Victoria Łukowa.

== Career ==
Żukowski began his career at Gryf Słupsk. He also played professionally for Fastav Zlín of the Czech National Football League. In June 2015, he signed a contract with III liga side Motor Lublin.

In August 2017, he was named as goalkeeping coach at Avia Świdnik.

== Honours ==
Górnik Łęczna

- III liga, group IV: 2007–08

Motor Lublin

- III liga Lublin–Subcarpathia: 2015–16
