= Zhukovskaya, Kharovsky District, Vologda Oblast =

Zhukovskaya Жуковская
- Village
- Location within Vologda Oblast Location within Russia
- Coordinates: 60°10′N 39°36′E
- Country: Russia
- Region: Vologda Oblast
- District: Kharovsky District
- Time zone: UTC+3:00

Zhukovskaya (Russian: Жуковская) is a rural locality (a village) in Kumzerskoye Rural Settlement, Kharovsky District, Vologda Oblast, Russia. The population was 1 as of 2002.

== Geography ==
Zhukovskaya is located 53 km northwest of Kharovsk (the district's administrative centre) by road. Opurinskaya is the nearest rural locality.
