= Kurtamyshsky District =

District in Kurgan Oblast, Russia

Kurtamyshsky District Куртамышский район (Russian)
- District
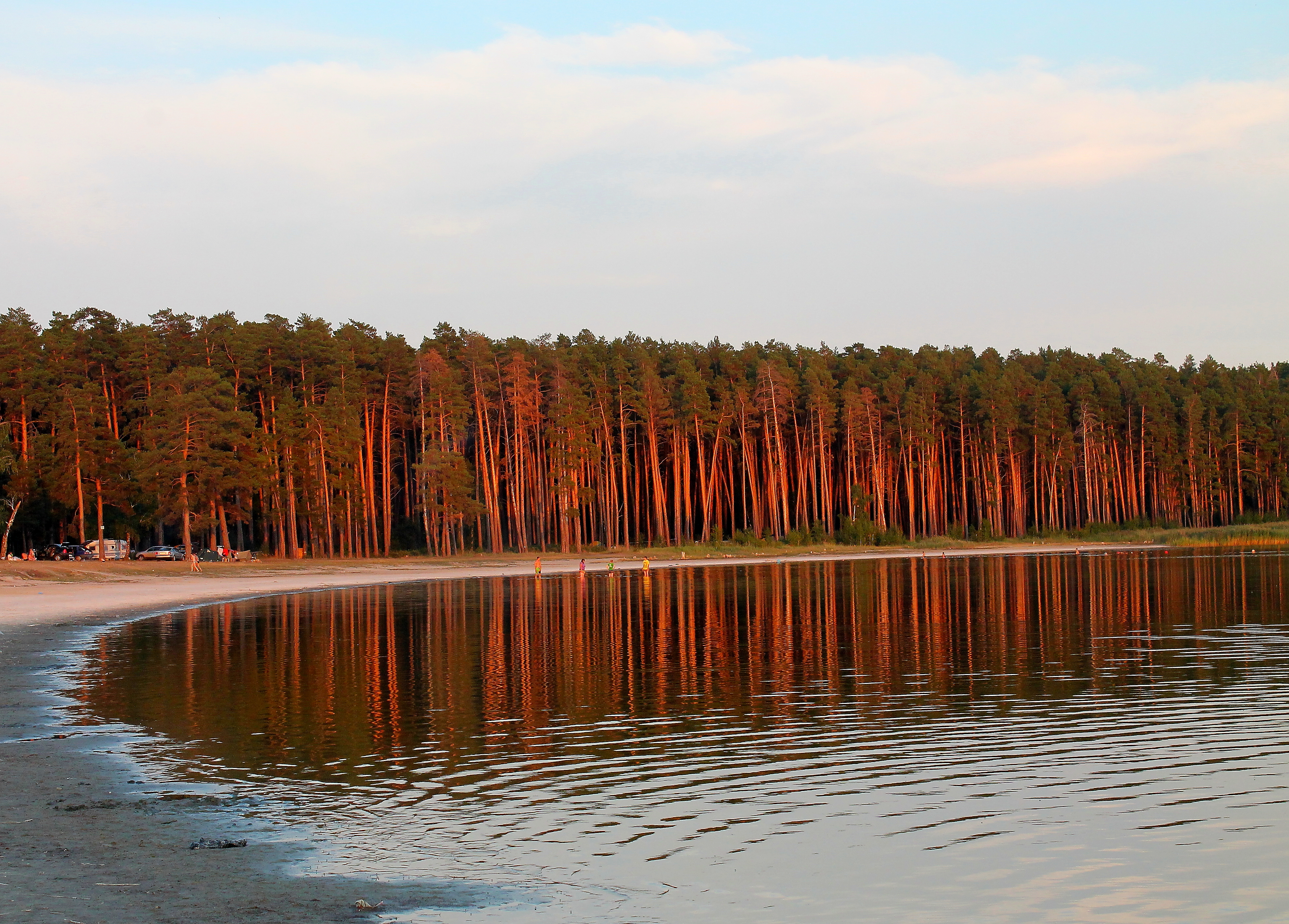
- Lake Gorykoye-Uzkovo, Kurtamyshsky District

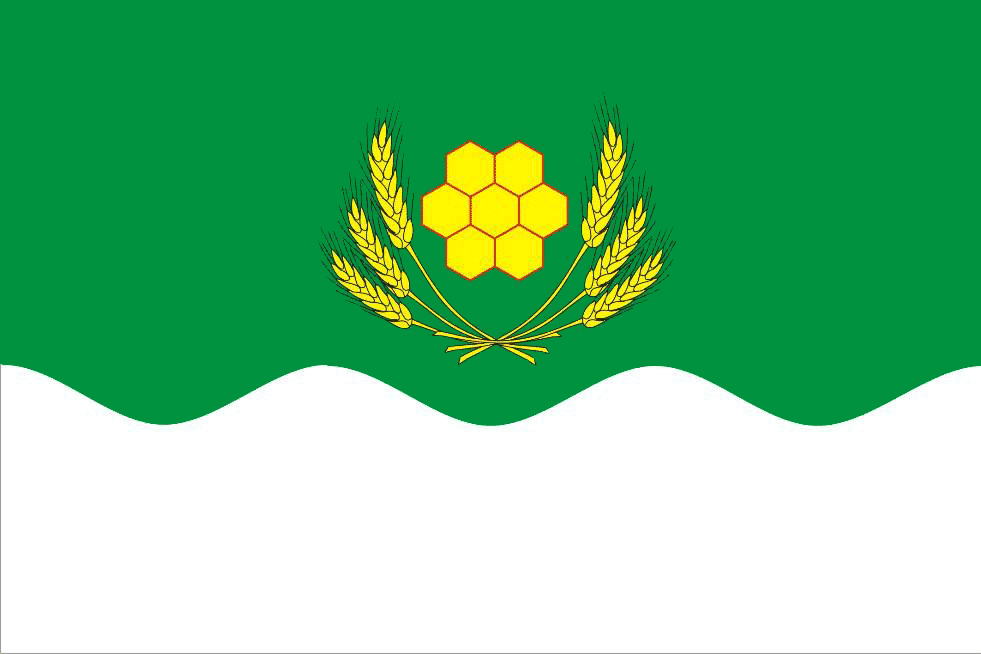
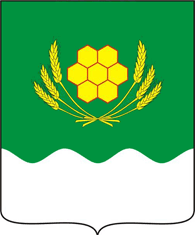
- Flag Coat of arms
- Location of Kurtamyshsky District in Kurgan Oblast
- Coordinates: 54°54′00″N 64°26′00″E
- Country: Russia
- Federal subject: Kurgan Oblast
- Established: 1924
- Administrative center: Kurtamysh

Area
  - Total: 3,950 km^{2} (1,530 sq mi)

Population (2010 Census)
  - Total: 32,155
  - Density: 8.14/km^{2} (21.1/sq mi)
  - Urban: 53.2%
  - Rural: 46.8%

Administrative structure
  - Administrative divisions: 1 Towns under district jurisdiction, 20 Selsoviets
  - Inhabited localities: 1 cities/towns, 58 rural localities

Municipal structure
  - Municipally incorporated as: Kurtamyshsky Municipal District
  - Municipal divisions: 1 urban settlements, 20 rural settlements
- Time zone: UTC+5 (MSK+2)
- OKTMO ID: 37616000
- Website: http://www.region-kurtamysh.com/

Kurtamyshsky District (Russian: Куртамы́шский райо́н) is an administrative and municipal district (raion), one of the twenty-four in Kurgan Oblast, Russia. It is located in the south of the oblast. The area of the district is 3,950 square kilometers (1,530 sq mi). Its administrative center is the town of Kurtamysh. Population: 32,155 (2010 census); 38,176 (2002 Census); 46,820 (1989 Soviet census). The population of Kurtamysh accounts for 53.2% of the district's total population.
