= Kurtamysh (town) =

Town in Kurgan Oblast, Russia

Kurtamysh Куртамыш
- Town
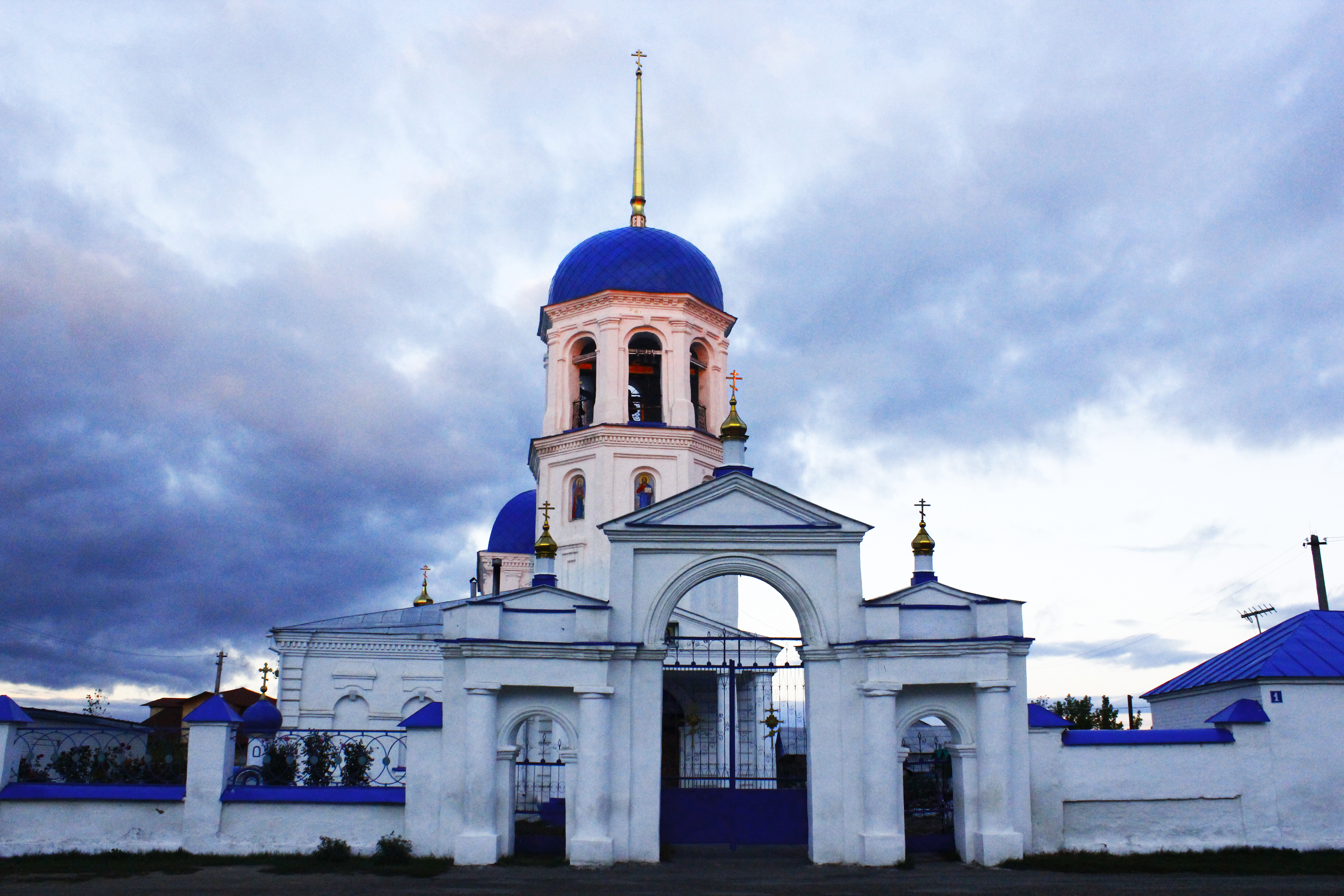
- The Peter and Paul Church in Kurtamysh

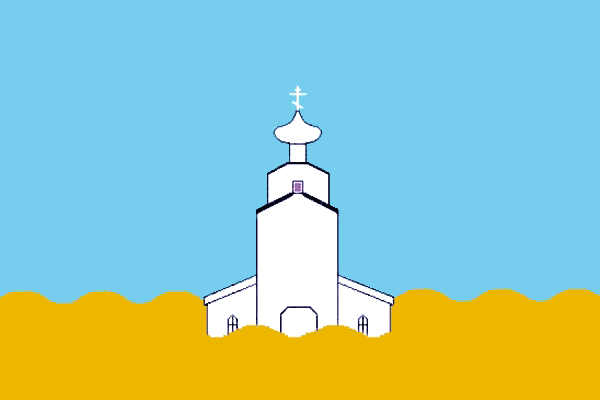
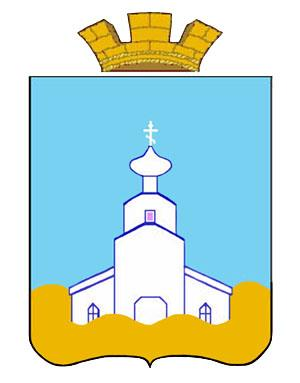
- Flag Coat of arms
- Interactive map of Kurtamysh
- Location of Kurtamysh Kurtamysh (Kurgan Oblast)
- Coordinates: 54°55′N 64°26′E
- Country: Russia
- Federal subject: Kurgan Oblast
- Administrative district: Kurtamyshsky District
- Town under district jurisdictionSelsoviet: Kurtamysh
- Founded: 1745
- Town status since: 1956

Government
  - Body: City Duma

Area
  - Total: 97 km^{2} (37 sq mi)
- Elevation: 110 m (360 ft)

Population (2010 Census)
  - Total: 17,099
  - Estimate (2025): 14,629 (−14.4%)
  - Density: 180/km^{2} (460/sq mi)

Administrative status
  - Capital of: Kurtamyshsky District, Kurtamysh Town Under District Jurisdiction

Municipal status
  - Municipal district: Kurtamyshsky Municipal District
  - Urban settlement: Kurtamysh Urban Settlement
  - Capital of: Kurtamyshsky Municipal District, Kurtamysh Urban Settlement
- Time zone: UTC+5 (MSK+2)
- Postal code: 641430–641432
- Dialing code: +7 35249
- OKTMO ID: 37616101001
- Website: www.kurtadm.ru

Kurtamysh (Russian: Куртамы́ш) is a town and the administrative center of Kurtamyshsky District in Kurgan Oblast, Russia, located on the Kurtamysh River 88 kilometers (55 mi) southwest of Kurgan, the administrative center of the oblast. Population: 17,099 (2010 census); 18,154 (2002 census); 19,155 (1989 Soviet census).

== History ==
It was founded in 1745 as a fortification on the Kurtamysh River. Since 1762 it is referred to as the sloboda of Kurtamyshskaya (Куртамы́шская). It was granted town status in 1956.

== Administrative and municipal status ==
Within the framework of administrative divisions, Kurtamysh serves as the administrative center of Kurtamyshsky District. As an administrative division, it is incorporated within Kurtamyshsky District as Kurtamysh Town Under District Jurisdiction. As a municipal division, Kurtamysh Town Under District Jurisdiction is incorporated within Kurtamyshsky Municipal District as Kurtamysh Urban Settlement.
