= Zhukovsky (surname) =

Zhukovsky or Zhukovski (Russian: Жуковский, Ukrainian: Жуковський, Belarusian: Жукоўскі) is an East Slavic masculine surname. Its feminine counterpart is Zhukovskaya (Russian) or Zhukovska (Ukrainian). It originates from the noun zhuk, which means beetle and is used as slang for a person with dark hair. In the past it was transliterated as Joukowski. Notable people with the surname include:

- Alexandra Zhukovskaya (1842–1899), Russian noble and lady in waiting
- Aleksey Belevsky-Zhukovsky (1871–1931), Russian nobleman
- Denis Zhukovskiy (born 1980), Russian football player
- Nikolay Zhukovsky (revolutionary) (1833–1895), Russian revolutionary
- Nikolay Zhukovsky (scientist) (1847–1921), Russian scientist
- Stanislav Zhukovsky (1875–1944), Polish-Russian impressionist painter
- Valentin Zhukovski (1858–1918), Russian orientalist
- Valery Zhukowski (born 1984), Belarusian footballer
- Vasily Zhukovsky (1783–1852), Russian poet
- Vitaly Zhukovsky (born 1984), Belarusian footballer

== See also ==
- Žukauskas, Lithuanian surname
- Żukowski, Polish surname
- Zhukovskaya, Kharovsky District, Vologda Oblast, village in Russia
