= Zhukovsky District, Kaluga Oblast =

Zhukovsky District Жуковский район (Russian)
- District
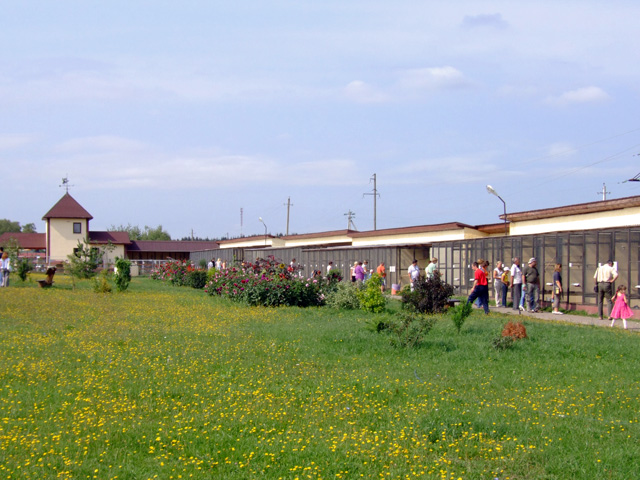
- Bird Park Vorobi, Zhukovsky District

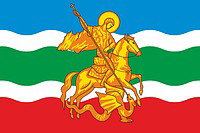
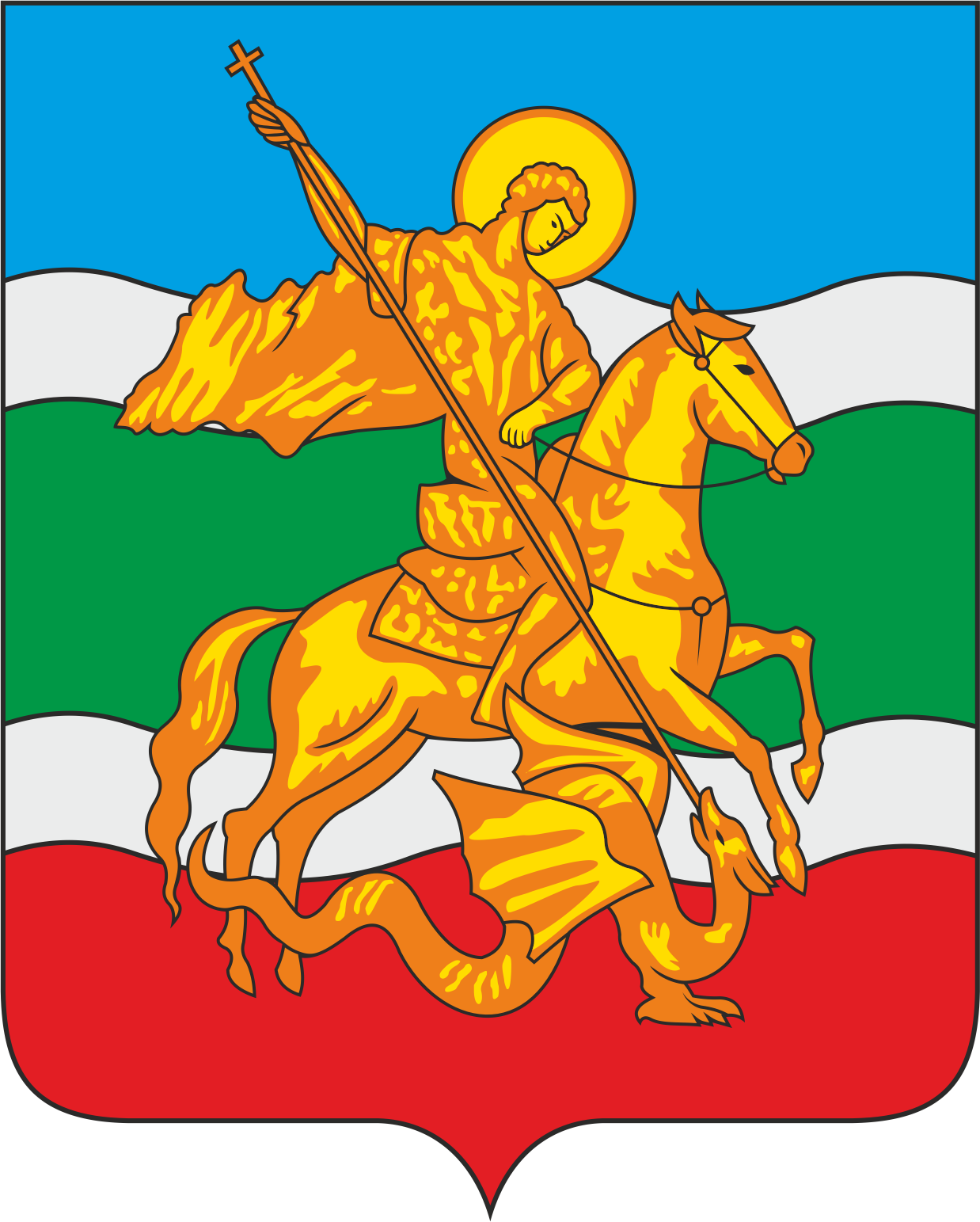
- Flag Coat of arms
- Location of Zhukovsky District in Kaluga Oblast
- Coordinates: 55°02′N 36°45′E
- Country: Russia
- Federal subject: Kaluga Oblast
- Established: 12 July 1929
- Administrative center: Zhukov

Area
  - Total: 1,360 km^{2} (530 sq mi)

Population (2010 Census)
  - Total: 48,999
  - Density: 36.0/km^{2} (93.3/sq mi)
  - Urban: 65.7%
  - Rural: 34.3%

Administrative structure
  - Inhabited localities: 3 cities/towns, 1 urban-type settlements, 170 rural localities

Municipal structure
  - Municipally incorporated as: Zhukovsky Municipal District
  - Municipal divisions: 3 urban settlements, 12 rural settlements
- Time zone: UTC+3 (MSK)
- OKTMO ID: 29613000
- Website: http://adm-zhukov.ru/

Zhukovsky District (Russian: Жуковский райо́н) is an administrative and municipal district (raion), one of the twenty-four in Kaluga Oblast, Russia. It is located in the northeast of the oblast. The area of the district is 1,360 square kilometers (530 sq mi). Its administrative center is the town of Zhukov. Population: 62,370 (2021 census); 48,999 (2010 census); 46,180 (2002 Census); 45,940 (1989 Soviet census). The population of Zhukov accounts for 26.0% of the district's total population.
