= Zhukovka, Bryansk Oblast =

Town in Bryansk Oblast, Russia

Zhukovka Жуковка
- Town
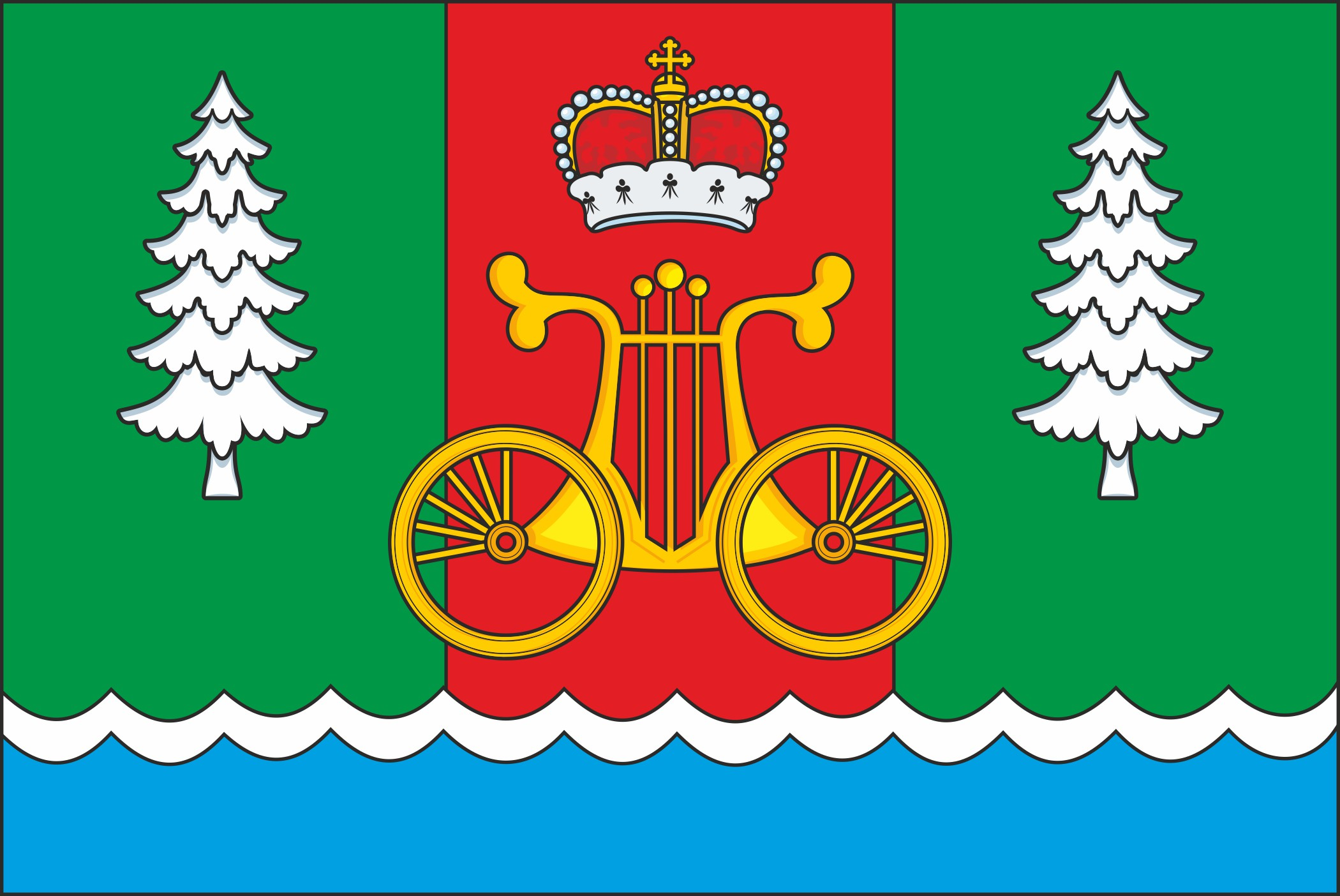
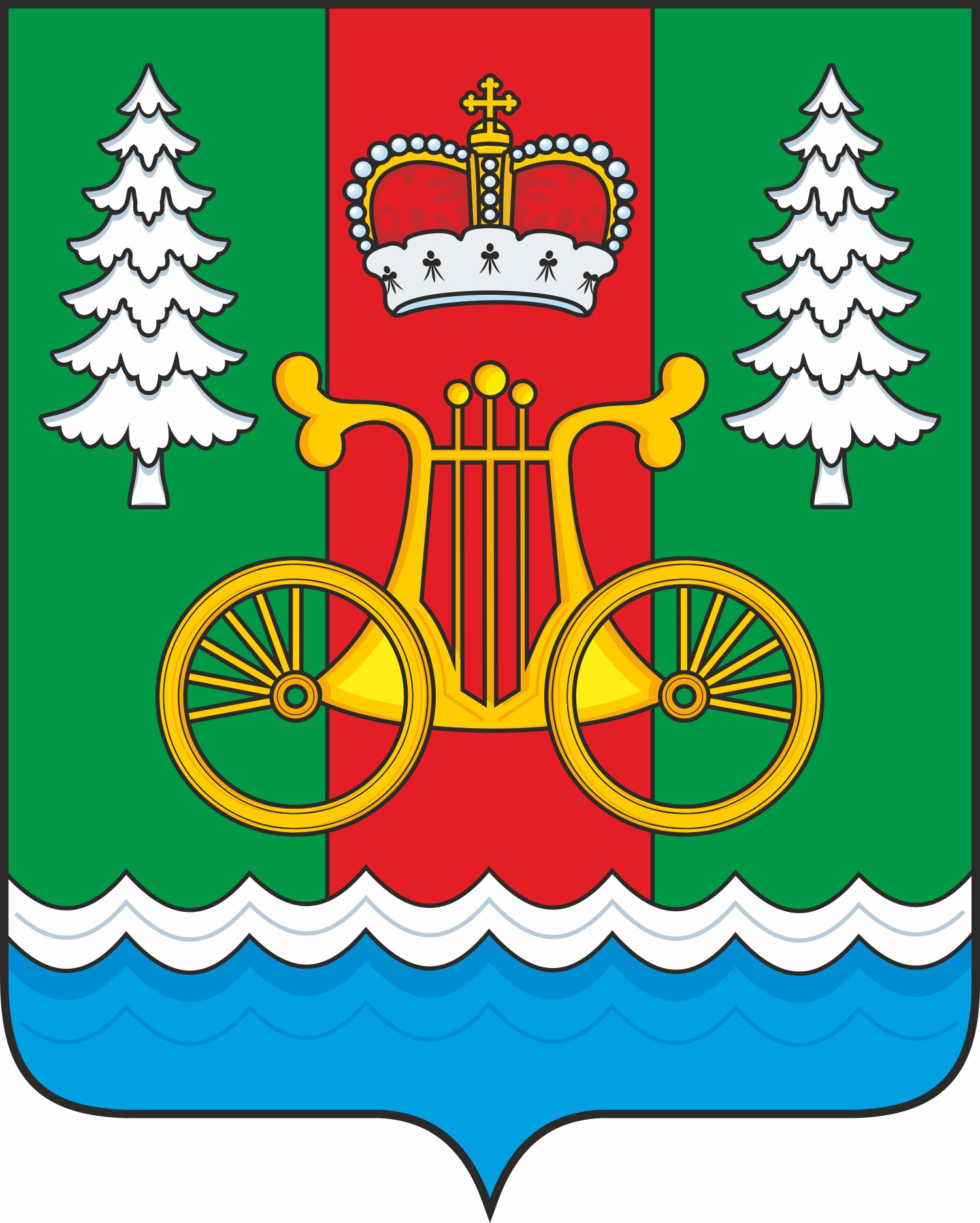
- Flag Coat of arms
- Interactive map of Zhukovka
- Location of Zhukovka Zhukovka (Bryansk Oblast)
- Coordinates: 53°32′N 33°44′E
- Country: Russia
- Federal subject: Bryansk Oblast
- Administrative district: Zhukovsky District
- Urban Administrative OkrugSelsoviet: Zhukovsky
- Founded: 1868
- Town status since: 1962
- Elevation: 170 m (560 ft)

Population (2010 Census)
  - Total: 18,269
  - Estimate (2021): 17,628 (−3.5%)

Administrative status
  - Capital of: Zhukovsky District, Zhukovsky Urban Administrative Okrug

Municipal status
  - Municipal district: Zhukovsky Municipal District
  - Urban settlement: Zhukovskoye Urban Settlement
  - Capital of: Zhukovsky Municipal District, Zhukovskoye Urban Settlement
- Time zone: UTC+3 (MSK)
- Postal code: 242700
- OKTMO ID: 15622101001

Zhukovka (Russian: Жуковка) is a town and the administrative center of Zhukovsky District in Bryansk Oblast, Russia, located on the left bank of the Desna River (Dnieper's basin) 56 kilometers (35 mi) northwest of Bryansk, the administrative center of the oblast. Population: 17,828 (2021 census); 18,269 (2010 census); 19,731 (2002 census); 19,706 (1989 Soviet census).

== History ==
It was founded in 1868 as a railway station on the Riga–Oryol railway. In the years that followed, a settlement grew around the Zhukovka station. In 1914, there were fewer than 2,000 inhabitants. During World War II, it was occupied by the Germans on August 24, 1941. Town status was granted to it in 1962.

== Administrative and municipal status ==
Within the framework of administrative divisions, Zhukovka serves as the administrative center of Zhukovsky District. As an administrative division, it is, together with seven rural localities, incorporated within Zhukovsky District as Zhukovsky Urban Administrative Okrug. As a municipal division, Zhukovsky Urban Administrative Okrug is incorporated within Zhukovsky Municipal District as Zhukovskoye Urban Settlement.

== Transportation ==
The 43-kilometer (27 mi) railway branch line leads to Kletnya.
