= Zhukovsky District, Bryansk Oblast =

Zhukovsky District Жуковский район (Russian)
- District
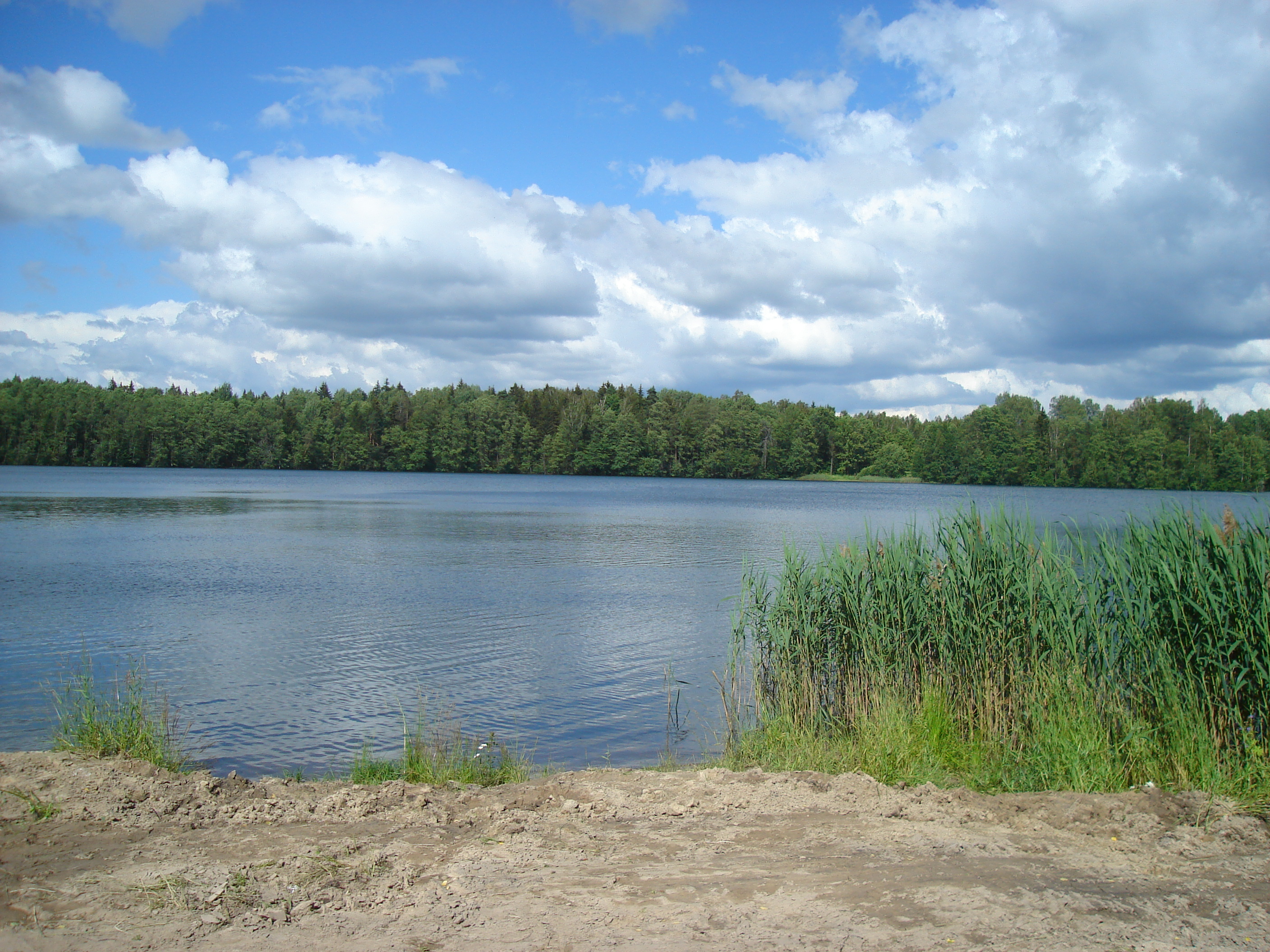
- Lake Svyatoye, a protected area of Russia in Zhukovsky District

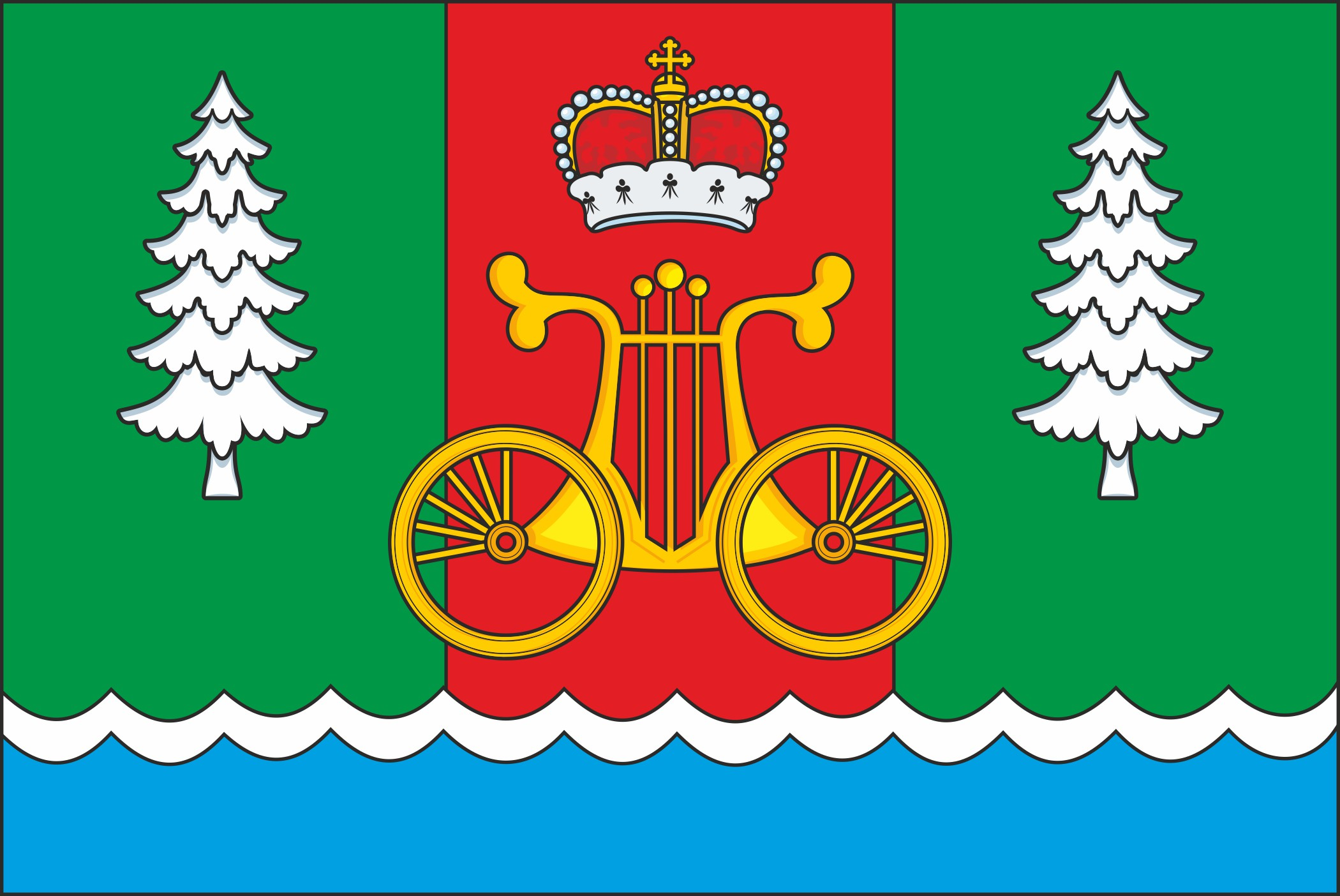
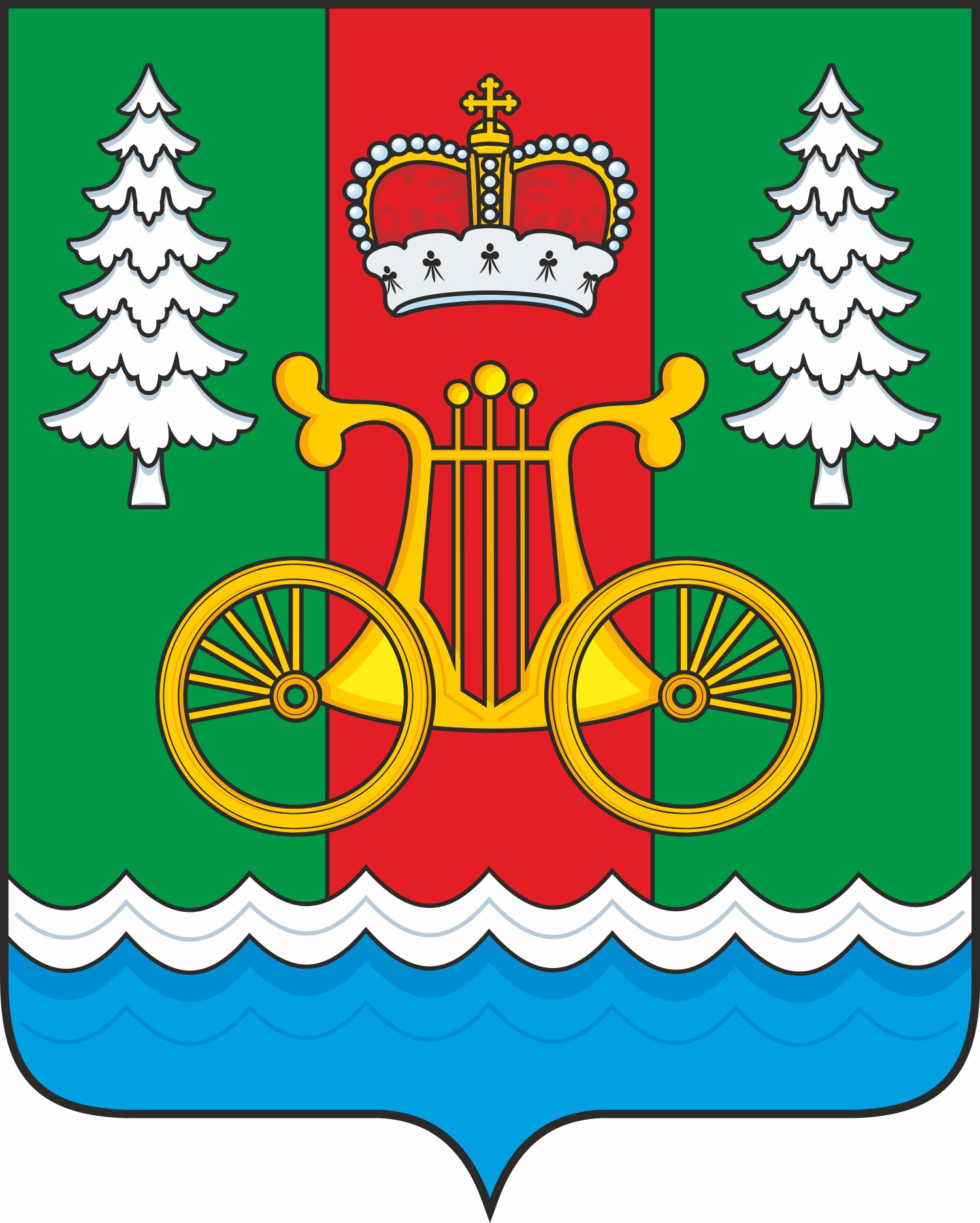
- Flag Coat of arms
- Location of Zhukovsky District in Bryansk Oblast
- Coordinates: 53°30′N 33°33′E
- Country: Russia
- Federal subject: Bryansk Oblast
- Established: June 17, 1929
- Administrative center: Zhukovka

Government
  - Type: Local government
  - Head: Vladimir Shuravko

Area
  - Total: 1,114 km^{2} (430 sq mi)

Population (2010 Census)
  - Total: 36,983
  - Density: 33.20/km^{2} (85.98/sq mi)
  - Urban: 49.4%
  - Rural: 50.6%

Administrative structure
  - Administrative divisions: 1 Urban administrative okrugs, 9 Rural administrative okrugs
  - Inhabited localities: 1 cities/towns, 85 rural localities

Municipal structure
  - Municipally incorporated as: Zhukovsky Municipal District
  - Municipal divisions: 1 urban settlements, 9 rural settlements
- Time zone: UTC+3 (MSK)
- OKTMO ID: 15622000
- Website: http://www.zh32.ru

Population of Zhukovsky District
- 2021 Census: 33,943
- 2010 Census: 36,983
- 2002 Census: 39,770
- 1989 Census: 36,812
- 1979 Census: 40,275

Zhukovsky District (Russian: Жу́ковский райо́н) is an administrative and municipal district (raion), one of the twenty-seven in Bryansk Oblast, Russia. It is located in the north of the oblast. The area of the district is 1,114 square kilometers (430 sq mi). Its administrative center is the town of Zhukovka. As of the 2021 Census, the total population of the district was 33,943, with the population of Zhukovka accounting for 52.5% of that number.

== History ==
The district was established on June 17, 1929 within Bryansk Okrug of Western Oblast.
