= Potanino =

Potanino (Russian: Потанино) is the name of several rural localities in Russia:

- Potanino, Republic of Buryatia, a settlement in Potaninsky Selsoviet of Bichursky District in the Republic of Buryatia
- Potanino, Palekhsky District, Ivanovo Oblast, a village in Palekhsky District of Ivanovo Oblast
- Potanino, Pestyakovsky District, Ivanovo Oblast, a village in Pestyakovsky District of Ivanovo Oblast
- Potanino, Leningrad Oblast, a village in Potaninskoye Settlement Municipal Formation of Volkhovsky District in Leningrad Oblast; 60°16′N 32°47′E
- Potanino, Nizhny Novgorod Oblast, a village in Shemanikhinsky Selsoviet of Krasnobakovsky District in Nizhny Novgorod Oblast; 57°19′N 45°25′E
- Potanino, Perm Krai, a village in Sivinsky District of Perm Krai
- Potanino, Sheksninsky District, Vologda Oblast, a village in Yershovsky Selsoviet of Sheksninsky District in Vologda Oblast
- Potanino, Vologodsky District, Vologda Oblast, a village in Kubensky Selsoviet of Vologodsky District in Vologda Oblast
- Potanino, Yaroslavl Oblast, a village in Glebovsky Rural Okrug of Pereslavsky District in Yaroslavl Oblast
