= Onuchevo =

Onuchevo Онучево
- Village
- Location within Ivanovo Oblast Location within Russia
- Coordinates: 56°56′N 41°57′E
- Country: Russia
- Region: Ivanovo Oblast
- District: Palekhsky District
- Time zone: UTC+3:00

Onuchevo (Russian: Онучево) is a rural locality (a village) in Palekhsky District, Ivanovo Oblast, Russia. Population: 6 (2010 census);

== Geography ==
This rural locality is located 16 kilometres (9.9 mi) from Palekh (the district's administrative centre), 61 kilometres (38 mi) from Ivanovo (capital of Ivanovo Oblast) and 294 kilometres (183 mi) from Moscow. Poddubnovo is the nearest rural locality.
