= Medvezhye, Palekhsky District, Ivanovo Oblast =

Medvezhye Медвежье
- Village
- Location within Ivanovo Oblast Location within Russia
- Coordinates: 56°42′N 41°50′E
- Country: Russia
- Region: Ivanovo Oblast
- District: Palekhsky District
- Time zone: UTC+3:00

Medvezhye (Russian: Медвежье) is a rural locality (a village) in Palekhsky District, Ivanovo Oblast, Russia. Population: 12 (2010 census);

== Geography ==
This rural locality is located 10 kilometres (6.2 mi) from Palekh (the district's administrative centre), 62 kilometres (39 mi) from Ivanovo (capital of Ivanovo Oblast) and 279 kilometres (173 mi) from Moscow. Kostyukhino is the nearest rural locality.
