= Ramenye, Palekhsky District, Ivanovo Oblast =

Ramenye Раменье
- Village
- Location within Ivanovo Oblast Location within Russia
- Coordinates: 56°49′N 41°45′E
- Country: Russia
- Region: Ivanovo Oblast
- District: Palekhsky District
- Time zone: UTC+3:00

Ramenye (Russian: Раменье) is a rural locality (a village) in Palekhsky District, Ivanovo Oblast, Russia. Population: 50 (2010 census);

== Geography ==
This rural locality is located 6 kilometres (3.7 mi) from Palekh (the district's administrative centre), 52 kilometres (32 mi) from Ivanovo (capital of Ivanovo Oblast) and 279 kilometres (173 mi) from Moscow. Ponkino is the nearest rural locality.
