= Linyovo, Ivanovo Oblast =

Linyovo Линёво
- Village
- Location within Ivanovo Oblast Location within Russia
- Coordinates: 56°49′N 42°07′E
- Country: Russia
- Region: Ivanovo Oblast
- District: Palekhsky District
- Time zone: UTC+3:00

Linyovo (Russian: Линёво) is a rural locality (a village) in Palekhsky District, Ivanovo Oblast, Russia. Population: 22 (2010 census);

== Geography ==
This rural locality is located 17 kilometres (11 mi) from Palekh (the district's administrative centre), 73 kilometres (45 mi) from Ivanovo (capital of Ivanovo Oblast) and 299 kilometres (186 mi) from Moscow. Kurilikha is the nearest rural locality.
