= Levino, Palekhsky District, Ivanovo Oblast =

Levino Левино
- Village
- Location within Ivanovo Oblast Location within Russia
- Coordinates: 56°47′N 42°04′E
- Country: Russia
- Region: Ivanovo Oblast
- District: Palekhsky District
- Time zone: UTC+3:00

Levino (Russian: Левино) is a rural locality (a village) in Palekhsky District, Ivanovo Oblast, Russia. Population: 5 (2010 census);

== Geography ==
This rural locality is located 14 kilometres (8.7 mi) from Palekh (the district's administrative centre), 72 kilometres (45 mi) from Ivanovo (capital of Ivanovo Oblast) and 295 kilometres (183 mi) from Moscow. Borodino is the nearest rural locality.
