= Shchavyevo =

Shchavyevo Щавьево
- Village
- Location within Ivanovo Oblast Location within Russia
- Coordinates: 56°55′N 41°48′E
- Country: Russia
- Region: Ivanovo Oblast
- District: Palekhsky District
- Time zone: UTC+3:00

Shchavyevo (Russian: Щавьево) is a rural locality (a village) in Palekhsky District, Ivanovo Oblast, Russia. Population: 14 (2010 census);

== Geography ==
This rural locality is located 14 kilometres (8.7 mi) from Palekh (the district's administrative centre), 51 kilometres (32 mi) from Ivanovo (capital of Ivanovo Oblast) and 285 kilometres (177 mi) from Moscow. Poddorozhnovo is the nearest rural locality.
