= Konoplyanovo =

Konoplyanovo Конопляново
- Village
- Location within Ivanovo Oblast Location within Russia
- Coordinates: 56°54′N 41°49′E
- Country: Russia
- Region: Ivanovo Oblast
- District: Palekhsky District
- Time zone: UTC+3:00

Konoplyanovo (Russian: Конопляново) is a rural locality (a village) in Palekhsky District, Ivanovo Oblast, Russia. Population: 59 (2010 census);

== Geography ==
This rural locality is located 12 kilometres (7.5 mi) from Palekh (the district's administrative centre), 53 kilometres (33 mi) from Ivanovo (capital of Ivanovo Oblast) and 286 kilometres (178 mi) from Moscow. Maydakovo is the nearest rural locality.
