= Kletino =

Kletino Клетино
- Village
- Location within Ivanovo Oblast Location within Russia
- Coordinates: 56°47′N 41°39′E
- Country: Russia
- Region: Ivanovo Oblast
- District: Palekhsky District
- Time zone: UTC+3:00

Kletino (Russian: Клетино) is a rural locality (a village) in Palekhsky District, Ivanovo Oblast, Russia. Population: 111 (2010 census);

== Geography ==
This rural locality is located 12 kilometres (7.5 mi) from Palekh (the district's administrative centre), 48 kilometres (30 mi) from Ivanovo (capital of Ivanovo Oblast) and 272 kilometres (169 mi) from Moscow. Matyukino is the nearest rural locality.
