= Melyoshino =

Melyoshino Мелёшино
- Village
- Location within Ivanovo Oblast Location within Russia
- Coordinates: 56°49′N 41°59′E
- Country: Russia
- Region: Ivanovo Oblast
- District: Palekhsky District
- Time zone: UTC+3:00

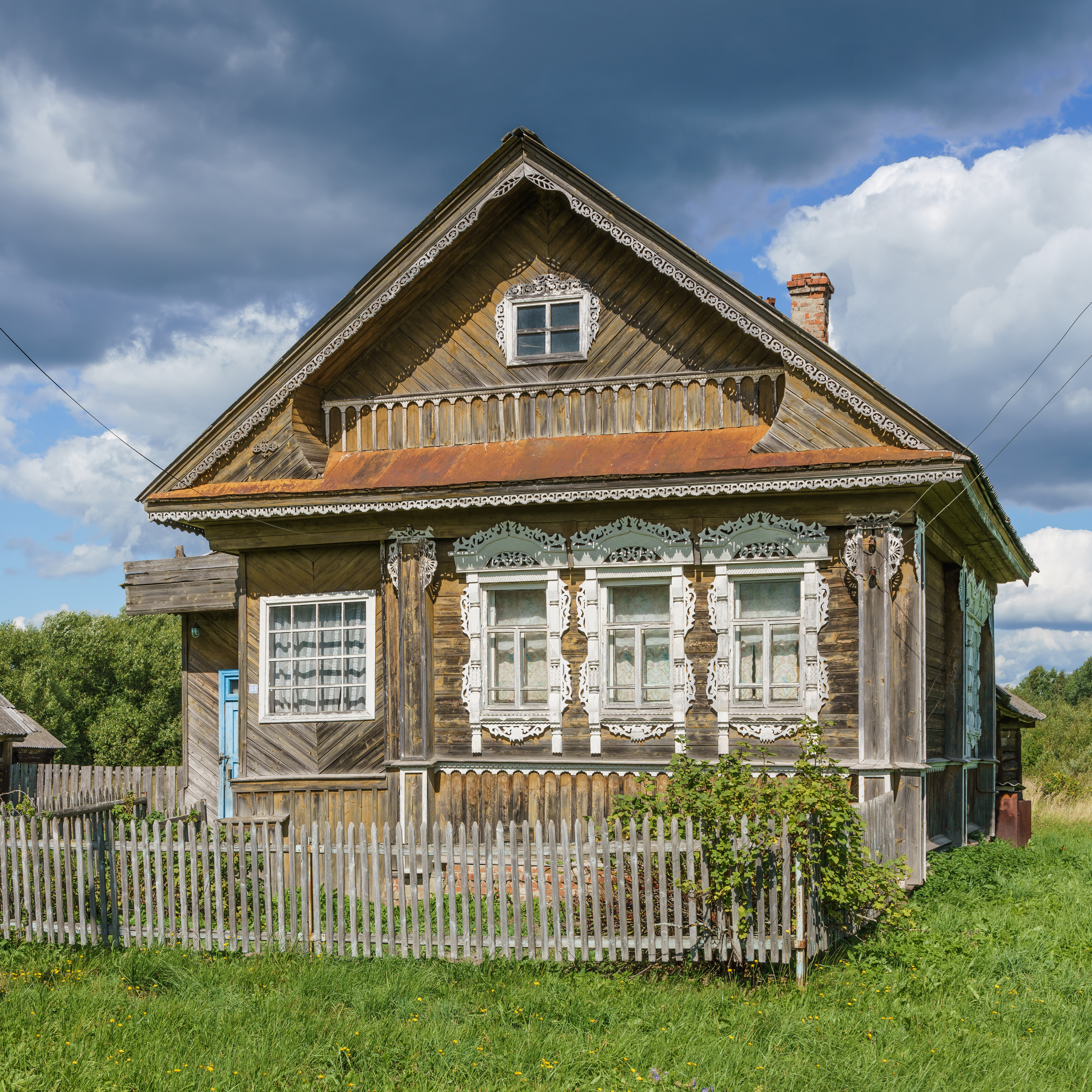
Wooden house in Melyoshino, Ivanovo Oblast, Russia.

Melyoshino (Russian: Мелёшино) is a rural locality (a selo) in Palekhsky District, Ivanovo Oblast, Russia. Population: 48 (2010 census);

== Geography ==
This rural locality is located 9 kilometres (5.6 mi) from Palekh (the district's administrative centre), 65 kilometres (40 mi) from Ivanovo (capital of Ivanovo Oblast) and 291 kilometres (181 mi) from Moscow. Baryshki is the nearest rural locality.
