= Ulyanikha, Ivanovo Oblast =

Ulyanikha Ульяниха
- Village
- Location within Ivanovo Oblast Location within Russia
- Coordinates: 56°50′N 42°09′E
- Country: Russia
- Region: Ivanovo Oblast
- District: Palekhsky District
- Time zone: UTC+3:00

Ulyanikha (Russian: Ульяниха) is a rural locality (a village) in Palekhsky District, Ivanovo Oblast, Russia. Population: 28 (2010 census);

== Geography ==
This rural locality is located 19 kilometres (12 mi) from Palekh (the district's administrative centre), 74 kilometres (46 mi) from Ivanovo (capital of Ivanovo Oblast) and 301 kilometres (187 mi) from Moscow. Linevo is the nearest rural locality.
