= Bogatishchi =

Bogatishchi Богатищи
- Village
- Location within Ivanovo Oblast Location within Russia
- Coordinates: 56°51′N 41°52′E
- Country: Russia
- Region: Ivanovo Oblast
- District: Palekhsky District
- Time zone: UTC+3:00

Bogatishchi (Russian: Богатищи) is a rural locality (a village) in Palekhsky District, Ivanovo Oblast, Russia. Population: 9 (2010 census);

== Geography ==
This rural locality is located 6 kilometres (3.7 mi) from Palekh (the district's administrative centre), 57 kilometres (35 mi) from Ivanovo (capital of Ivanovo Oblast) and 286 kilometres (178 mi) from Moscow. Lukino is the nearest rural locality.
