= Pakhotino, Ivanovo Oblast =

Pakhotino Пахотино
- Village
- Location within Ivanovo Oblast Location within Russia
- Coordinates: 56°47′N 41°40′E
- Country: Russia
- Region: Ivanovo Oblast
- District: Palekhsky District
- Time zone: UTC+3:00

Pakhotino (Russian: Пахотино) is a rural locality (a village) in Palekhsky District, Ivanovo Oblast, Russia. Population: 33 (2010 census);

== Geography ==
This rural locality is located 11 kilometres (6.8 mi) from Palekh (the district's administrative centre), 48 kilometres (30 mi) from Ivanovo (capital of Ivanovo Oblast) and 273 kilometres (170 mi) from Moscow. Kletino is the nearest rural locality.
