= Malinovo, Palekhsky District, Ivanovo Oblast =

Malinovo Малиново
- Village
- Location within Ivanovo Oblast Location within Russia
- Coordinates: 56°54′N 42°00′E
- Country: Russia
- Region: Ivanovo Oblast
- District: Palekhsky District
- Time zone: UTC+3:00

Malinovo (Russian: Малиново) is a rural locality (a village) in Palekhsky District, Ivanovo Oblast, Russia. Population: 33 (2010 census);

== Geography ==
This rural locality is located 16 kilometres (9.9 mi) from Palekh (the district's administrative centre), 64 kilometres (40 mi) from Ivanovo (capital of Ivanovo Oblast) and 296 kilometres (184 mi) from Moscow. Nikonovo is the nearest rural locality.
