= Yakovlevo, Palekhsky District, Ivanovo Oblast =

Yakovlevo Яковлево
- Village
- Location within Ivanovo Oblast Location within Russia
- Coordinates: 56°47′N 42°15′E
- Country: Russia
- Region: Ivanovo Oblast
- District: Palekhsky District
- Time zone: UTC+3:00

Yakovlevo (Russian: Яковлево) is a rural locality (a village) in Palekhsky District, Ivanovo Oblast, Russia. Population: 19 (2010 census);

== Geography ==
This rural locality is located 24 kilometres (15 mi) from Palekh (the district's administrative centre), 82 kilometres (51 mi) from Ivanovo (capital of Ivanovo Oblast) and 305 kilometres (190 mi) from Moscow. Spas-Shelutino is the nearest rural locality.
