= Ovsyanitsy, Palekhsky District, Ivanovo Oblast =

Ovsyanitsy Овсяницы
- Village
- Location within Ivanovo Oblast Location within Russia
- Coordinates: 56°47′N 41°38′E
- Country: Russia
- Region: Ivanovo Oblast
- District: Palekhsky District
- Time zone: UTC+3:00

Ovsyanitsy (Russian: Овсяницы) is a rural locality (a village) in Palekhsky District, Ivanovo Oblast, Russia. Population: 57 (2010 census);

== Geography ==
This rural locality is located 13 kilometres (8.1 mi) from Palekh (the district's administrative centre), 47 kilometres (29 mi) from Ivanovo (capital of Ivanovo Oblast) and 270 kilometres (170 mi) from Moscow. Rudilnitsy is the nearest rural locality.
