= Belikovo =

Belikovo Беликово
- Village
- Location within Ivanovo Oblast Location within Russia
- Coordinates: 56°49′N 41°56′E
- Country: Russia
- Region: Ivanovo Oblast
- District: Palekhsky District
- Time zone: UTC+3:00

Belikovo (Russian: Беликово) is a rural locality (a village) in Palekhsky District, Ivanovo Oblast, Russia. Population: 25 (2010 census);

== Geography ==
This rural locality is located 5 kilometres (3.1 mi) from Palekh (the district's administrative centre), 62 kilometres (39 mi) from Ivanovo (capital of Ivanovo Oblast) and 288 kilometres (179 mi) from Moscow. Baryshki is the nearest rural locality.
