= Ponkino =

Ponkino Понькино
- Village
- Location within Ivanovo Oblast Location within Russia
- Coordinates: 56°49′N 41°45′E
- Country: Russia
- Region: Ivanovo Oblast
- District: Palekhsky District
- Time zone: UTC+3:00

Ponkino (Russian: Понькино) is a rural locality (a village) in Palekhsky District, Ivanovo Oblast, Russia. Population: 16 (2010 census);

== Geography ==
This rural locality is located 7 kilometres (4.3 mi) from Palekh (the district's administrative centre), 51 kilometres (32 mi) from Ivanovo (capital of Ivanovo Oblast) and 279 kilometres (173 mi) from Moscow. Ramenye is the nearest rural locality.
