= Timenka, Ivanovo Oblast =

Timenka Тименка
- Village
- Location within Ivanovo Oblast Location within Russia
- Coordinates: 56°44′N 41°48′E
- Country: Russia
- Region: Ivanovo Oblast
- District: Palekhsky District
- Time zone: UTC+3:00

Timenka (Russian: Тименка) is a rural locality (a selo) in Palekhsky District, Ivanovo Oblast, Russia. Population: 153 (2010 census);

== Geography ==
This rural locality is located 7 kilometres (4.3 mi) from Palekh (the district's administrative centre), 58 kilometres (36 mi) from Ivanovo (capital of Ivanovo Oblast) and 278 kilometres (173 mi) from Moscow. Burdinka is the nearest rural locality.
