= Penki, Palekhsky District, Ivanovo Oblast =

Penki Пеньки
- Village
- Location within Ivanovo Oblast Location within Russia
- Coordinates: 56°49′N 42°13′E
- Country: Russia
- Region: Ivanovo Oblast
- District: Palekhsky District
- Time zone: UTC+3:00

Penki (Russian: Пеньки) is a rural locality (a village) in Palekhsky District, Ivanovo Oblast, Russia. Population: 431 (2010 census);

== Geography ==
This rural locality is located 22 kilometres (14 mi) from Palekh (the district's administrative centre), 79 kilometres (49 mi) from Ivanovo (capital of Ivanovo Oblast) and 304 kilometres (189 mi) from Moscow. Kolzaki is the nearest rural locality.
