= Prudovo =

Prudovo Прудово
- Village
- Location within Ivanovo Oblast Location within Russia
- Coordinates: 56°51′N 41°55′E
- Country: Russia
- Region: Ivanovo Oblast
- District: Palekhsky District
- Time zone: UTC+3:00

Prudovo (Russian: Прудово) is a rural locality (a village) in Palekhsky District, Ivanovo Oblast, Russia. Population: 8 (2010 census);

== Geography ==
This rural locality is located 7 kilometres (4.3 mi) from Palekh (the district's administrative centre), 60 kilometres (37 mi) from Ivanovo (capital of Ivanovo Oblast) and 289 kilometres (180 mi) from Moscow. Fomino is the nearest rural locality.
