= Telichnovo =

Telichnovo Теличново
- Village
- Location within Ivanovo Oblast Location within Russia
- Coordinates: 56°53′N 41°46′E
- Country: Russia
- Region: Ivanovo Oblast
- District: Palekhsky District
- Time zone: UTC+3:00

Telichnovo (Russian: Теличново) is a rural locality (a village) in Palekhsky District, Ivanovo Oblast, Russia. Population: 23 (2010 census);

== Geography ==
This rural locality is located 11 kilometres (6.8 mi) from Palekh (the district's administrative centre), 50 kilometres (31 mi) from Ivanovo (capital of Ivanovo Oblast) and 282 kilometres (175 mi) from Moscow. Teplovo is the nearest rural locality.
