= Podolino =

Podolino Подолино
- Village
- Location within Ivanovo Oblast Location within Russia
- Coordinates: 56°49′N 41°54′E
- Country: Russia
- Region: Ivanovo Oblast
- District: Palekhsky District
- Time zone: UTC+3:00

Podolino (Russian: Подолино) is a rural locality (a selo) in Palekhsky District, Ivanovo Oblast, Russia. Population: 140 (2010 census);

== Geography ==
This rural locality is located 4 kilometres (2.5 mi) from Palekh (the district's administrative centre), 61 kilometres (38 mi) from Ivanovo (capital of Ivanovo Oblast) and 287 kilometres (178 mi) from Moscow. Belikovo is the nearest rural locality.
