= Shogotovo =

Shogotovo Шоготово
- Village
- Location within Ivanovo Oblast Location within Russia
- Coordinates: 56°44′N 42°03′E
- Country: Russia
- Region: Ivanovo Oblast
- District: Palekhsky District
- Time zone: UTC+3:00

Shogotovo (Russian: Шоготово) is a rural locality (a village) in Palekhsky District, Ivanovo Oblast, Russia. Population: 11 (2010 census);

== Geography ==
This rural locality is located 14 kilometres (8.7 mi) from Palekh (the district's administrative centre), 72 kilometres (45 mi) from Ivanovo (capital of Ivanovo Oblast) and 293 kilometres (182 mi) from Moscow. Fedurikha is the nearest rural locality.
