= Dorki Bolshiye =

Dorki Bolshiye Дорки Большие
- Village
- Location within Ivanovo Oblast Location within Russia
- Coordinates: 56°50′N 41°40′E
- Country: Russia
- Region: Ivanovo Oblast
- District: Palekhsky District
- Time zone: UTC+3:00

Dorki Bolshiye (Russian: Дорки Большие) is a rural locality (a selo) in Palekhsky District, Ivanovo Oblast, Russia. Population: 8 (2010 census);

== Geography ==
This rural locality is located 12 kilometres (7.5 mi) from Palekh (the district's administrative centre), 46 kilometres (29 mi) from Ivanovo (capital of Ivanovo Oblast) and 274 kilometres (170 mi) from Moscow. Dorki Malye is the nearest rural locality.
