= Rybino, Ivanovo Oblast =

Rybino Рыбино
- Village
- Location within Ivanovo Oblast Location within Russia
- Coordinates: 56°46′N 42°13′E
- Country: Russia
- Region: Ivanovo Oblast
- District: Palekhsky District
- Time zone: UTC+3:00

Rybino (Russian: Рыбино) is a rural locality (a village) in Palekhsky District, Ivanovo Oblast, Russia. Population: 14 (2010 census);

== Geography ==
This rural locality is located 23 kilometres (14 mi) from Palekh (the district's administrative centre), 80 kilometres (50 mi) from Ivanovo (capital of Ivanovo Oblast) and 303 kilometres (188 mi) from Moscow. Yakovlevo is the nearest rural locality.
