= Dubokolikha =

Dubokolikha Дубоколиха
- Village
- Location within Ivanovo Oblast Location within Russia
- Coordinates: 56°48′N 42°03′E
- Country: Russia
- Region: Ivanovo Oblast
- District: Palekhsky District
- Time zone: UTC+3:00

Dubokolikha (Russian: Дубоколиха) is a rural locality (a village) in Palekhsky District, Ivanovo Oblast, Russia. Population: 15 (2010 census);

== Geography ==
This rural locality is located 12 kilometres (7.5 mi) from Palekh (the district's administrative centre), 69 kilometres (43 mi) from Ivanovo (capital of Ivanovo Oblast) and 294 kilometres (183 mi) from Moscow. Kazakovo is the nearest rural locality.
