= Rudilnitsy, Ivanovo Oblast =

Rudilnitsy Рудильницы
- Village
- Location within Ivanovo Oblast Location within Russia
- Coordinates: 56°47′N 41°38′E
- Country: Russia
- Region: Ivanovo Oblast
- District: Palekhsky District
- Time zone: UTC+3:00

Rudilnitsy (Russian: Рудильницы) is a rural locality (a village) in Palekhsky District, Ivanovo Oblast, Russia. Population: 14 (2010 census);

== Geography ==
This rural locality is located 13 kilometres (8.1 mi) from Palekh (the district's administrative centre), 46 kilometres (29 mi) from Ivanovo (capital of Ivanovo Oblast) and 270 kilometres (170 mi) from Moscow. Ternevo is the nearest rural locality.
