= Shalimovo, Ivanovo Oblast =

Shalimovo Шалимово
- Village
- Location within Ivanovo Oblast Location within Russia
- Coordinates: 56°47′N 41°42′E
- Country: Russia
- Region: Ivanovo Oblast
- District: Palekhsky District
- Time zone: UTC+3:00

Shalimovo (Russian: Шалимово) is a rural locality (a village) in Palekhsky District, Ivanovo Oblast, Russia. Population: 7 (2010 census);

== Geography ==
This rural locality is located 9 kilometres (5.6 mi) from Palekh (the district's administrative centre), 50 kilometres (31 mi) from Ivanovo (capital of Ivanovo Oblast) and 275 kilometres (171 mi) from Moscow. Kivernikovo is the nearest rural locality.
