= Ivanovo-Ilyino =

Ivanovo-Ilyino Иваново-Ильино
- Village
- Location within Ivanovo Oblast Location within Russia
- Coordinates: 56°45′N 41°39′E
- Country: Russia
- Region: Ivanovo Oblast
- District: Palekhsky District
- Time zone: UTC+3:00

Ivanovo-Ilyino (Russian: Иваново-Ильино) is a rural locality (a village) in Palekhsky District, Ivanovo Oblast, Russia. Population: 7 (2010 census);

== Geography ==
This rural locality is located 13 kilometres (8.1 mi) from Palekh (the district's administrative centre), 50 kilometres (31 mi) from Ivanovo (capital of Ivanovo Oblast) and 270 kilometres (170 mi) from Moscow. Khmelniki is the nearest rural locality.
