= Lodygino, Palekhsky District, Ivanovo Oblast =

Lodygino Лодыгино
- Village
- Location within Ivanovo Oblast Location within Russia
- Coordinates: 56°46′N 42°07′E
- Country: Russia
- Region: Ivanovo Oblast
- District: Palekhsky District
- Time zone: UTC+3:00

Lodygino (Russian: Лодыгино) is a rural locality (a village) in Palekhsky District, Ivanovo Oblast, Russia. Population: 11 (2010 census);

== Geography ==
This rural locality is located 17 kilometres (11 mi) from Palekh (the district's administrative centre), 75 kilometres (47 mi) from Ivanovo (capital of Ivanovo Oblast) and 297 kilometres (185 mi) from Moscow. Ugletsy is the nearest rural locality.
