= Yurkino, Palekhsky District, Ivanovo Oblast =

Yurkino Юркино
- Village
- Location within Ivanovo Oblast Location within Russia
- Coordinates: 56°48′N 42°12′E
- Country: Russia
- Region: Ivanovo Oblast
- District: Palekhsky District
- Time zone: UTC+3:00

Yurkino (Russian: Юркино) is a rural locality (a village) in Palekhsky District, Ivanovo Oblast, Russia. Population: 26 (2010 census);

== Geography ==
This rural locality is located 21 kilometres (13 mi) from Palekh (the district's administrative centre), 78 kilometres (48 mi) from Ivanovo (capital of Ivanovo Oblast) and 303 kilometres (188 mi) from Moscow. Brazhnovo is the nearest rural locality.
