= Khotyonovo =

Khotyonovo Хотёново
- Village
- Location within Ivanovo Oblast Location within Russia
- Coordinates: 56°47′N 42°05′E
- Country: Russia
- Region: Ivanovo Oblast
- District: Palekhsky District
- Time zone: UTC+3:00

Khotyonovo (Russian: Хотёново) is a rural locality (a village) in Palekhsky District, Ivanovo Oblast, Russia. Population: 83 (2010 census);

== Geography ==
This rural locality is located 15 kilometres (9.3 mi) from Palekh (the district's administrative centre), 72 kilometres (45 mi) from Ivanovo (capital of Ivanovo Oblast) and 296 kilometres (184 mi) from Moscow. Sakulino is the nearest rural locality.
