= Brazhnovo =

Brazhnovo Бражново
- Village
- Location within Ivanovo Oblast Location within Russia
- Coordinates: 56°48′N 42°12′E
- Country: Russia
- Region: Ivanovo Oblast
- District: Palekhsky District
- Time zone: UTC+3:00

Brazhnovo (Russian: Бражново) is a rural locality (a village) in Palekhsky District, Ivanovo Oblast, Russia. Population: 25 (2010 census);

== Geography ==
This rural locality is located 22 kilometres (14 mi) from Palekh (the district's administrative centre), 79 kilometres (49 mi) from Ivanovo (capital of Ivanovo Oblast) and 303 kilometres (188 mi) from Moscow. Yurkino is the nearest rural locality.
