= Khrulyovo =

Khrulyovo Хрулёво
- Village
- Location within Ivanovo Oblast Location within Russia
- Coordinates: 56°45′N 41°49′E
- Country: Russia
- Region: Ivanovo Oblast
- District: Palekhsky District
- Time zone: UTC+3:00

Khrulyovo (Russian: Хрулёво) is a rural locality (a village) in Palekhsky District, Ivanovo Oblast, Russia. Population: 16 (2010 census);

== Geography ==
This rural locality is located 6 kilometres (3.7 mi) from Palekh (the district's administrative centre), 59 kilometres (37 mi) from Ivanovo (capital of Ivanovo Oblast) and 280 kilometres (170 mi) from Moscow. Burdinka is the nearest rural locality.
