= Kostyukhino =

Kostyukhino Костюхино
- Village
- Location within Ivanovo Oblast Location within Russia
- Coordinates: 56°44′N 41°48′E
- Country: Russia
- Region: Ivanovo Oblast
- District: Palekhsky District
- Time zone: UTC+3:00

Kostyukhino (Russian: Костюхино) is a rural locality (a village) in Palekhsky District, Ivanovo Oblast, Russia. Population: 25 (2010 census);

== Geography ==
This rural locality is located 8 kilometres (5.0 mi) from Palekh (the district's administrative centre), 59 kilometres (37 mi) from Ivanovo (capital of Ivanovo Oblast) and 278 kilometres (173 mi) from Moscow. Timenka is the nearest rural locality.
