= Dorki Malye =

Dorki Malye Дорки Малые
- Village
- Location within Ivanovo Oblast Location within Russia
- Coordinates: 56°49′N 41°41′E
- Country: Russia
- Region: Ivanovo Oblast
- District: Palekhsky District
- Time zone: UTC+3:00

Dorki Malye (Russian: Дорки Малые) is a rural locality (a selo) in Palekhsky District, Ivanovo Oblast, Russia. Population: 33 (2010 census);

== Geography ==
This rural locality is located 10 kilometres (6.2 mi) from Palekh (the district's administrative centre), 48 kilometres (30 mi) from Ivanovo (capital of Ivanovo Oblast) and 275 kilometres (171 mi) from Moscow. Potanino is the nearest rural locality.
