= Osinovets, Ivanovo Oblast =

Osinovets Осиновец
- Village
- Location within Ivanovo Oblast Location within Russia
- Coordinates: 56°54′N 41°46′E
- Country: Russia
- Region: Ivanovo Oblast
- District: Palekhsky District
- Time zone: UTC+3:00

Osinovets (Russian: Осиновец) is a rural locality (a village) in Palekhsky District, Ivanovo Oblast, Russia. Population: 28 (2010 census);

== Geography ==
This rural locality is located 12 kilometres (7.5 mi) from Palekh (the district's administrative centre), 50 kilometres (31 mi) from Ivanovo (capital of Ivanovo Oblast) and 282 kilometres (175 mi) from Moscow. Telichnovo is the nearest rural locality.
