= Kovshovo, Ivanovo Oblast =

Kovshovo Ковшово
- Village
- Location within Ivanovo Oblast Location within Russia
- Coordinates: 56°48′N 41°51′E
- Country: Russia
- Region: Ivanovo Oblast
- District: Palekhsky District
- Time zone: UTC+3:00

Kovshovo (Russian: Ковшово) is a rural locality (a village) in Palekhsky District, Ivanovo Oblast, Russia. Population: 62 (2010 census);

== Geography ==
This rural locality is located 1 kilometre (0.62 mi) from Palekh (the district's administrative centre), 57 kilometres (35 mi) from Ivanovo (capital of Ivanovo Oblast) and 283 kilometres (176 mi) from Moscow. Sergeyevo is the nearest rural locality.
