= Sergeyevo, Palekhsky District, Ivanovo Oblast =

Sergeyevo Сергеево
- Village
- Location within Ivanovo Oblast Location within Russia
- Coordinates: 56°49′N 41°52′E
- Country: Russia
- Region: Ivanovo Oblast
- District: Palekhsky District
- Time zone: UTC+3:00

Sergeyevo (Russian: Сергеево) is a rural locality (a village) in Palekhsky District, Ivanovo Oblast, Russia. Population: 23 (2010 census);

== Geography ==
This rural locality is located 3 kilometres (1.9 mi) from Palekh (the district's administrative centre), 58 kilometres (36 mi) from Ivanovo (capital of Ivanovo Oblast) and 285 kilometres (177 mi) from Moscow. Kovshovo is the nearest rural locality.
