= Svergino =

Svergino Свергино
- Village
- Location within Ivanovo Oblast Location within Russia
- Coordinates: 56°47′N 41°49′E
- Country: Russia
- Region: Ivanovo Oblast
- District: Palekhsky District
- Time zone: UTC+3:00

Svergino (Russian: Свергино) is a rural locality (a village) in Palekhsky District, Ivanovo Oblast, Russia. Population: 39 (2010 census);

== Geography ==
This rural locality is located 2 kilometres (1.2 mi) from Palekh (the district's administrative centre), 57 kilometres (35 mi) from Ivanovo (capital of Ivanovo Oblast) and 281 kilometres (175 mi) from Moscow. Palekh is the nearest rural locality.
