= Pomogalovo =

Pomogalovo Помогалово
- Village
- Location within Ivanovo Oblast Location within Russia
- Coordinates: 56°45′N 42°09′E
- Country: Russia
- Region: Ivanovo Oblast
- District: Palekhsky District
- Time zone: UTC+3:00

Pomogalovo (Russian: Помогалово) is a rural locality (a selo) in Palekhsky District, Ivanovo Oblast, Russia. Population: 60 (2010 census);

== Geography ==
This rural locality is located 19 kilometres (12 mi) from Palekh (the district's administrative centre), 77 kilometres (48 mi) from Ivanovo (capital of Ivanovo Oblast) and 298 kilometres (185 mi) from Moscow. Kochkino is the nearest rural locality.
