= Kuznechikha, Palekhsky District, Ivanovo Oblast =

Kuznechikha Кузнечиха
- Village
- Location within Ivanovo Oblast Location within Russia
- Coordinates: 56°48′N 41°43′E
- Country: Russia
- Region: Ivanovo Oblast
- District: Palekhsky District
- Time zone: UTC+3:00

Kuznechikha (Russian: Кузнечиха) is a rural locality (a village) in Palekhsky District, Ivanovo Oblast, Russia. Population: 45 (2010 census);

== Geography ==
This rural locality is located 8 kilometres (5.0 mi) from Palekh (the district's administrative centre), 51 kilometres (32 mi) from Ivanovo (capital of Ivanovo Oblast) and 276 kilometres (171 mi) from Moscow. Vorobino is the nearest rural locality.
