= Dyagilevo, Palekhsky District, Ivanovo Oblast =

Dyagilevo Дягилево
- Village
- Location within Ivanovo Oblast Location within Russia
- Coordinates: 56°49′N 41°49′E
- Country: Russia
- Region: Ivanovo Oblast
- District: Palekhsky District
- Time zone: UTC+3:00

Dyagilevo (Russian: Дягилево) is a rural locality (a village) in Palekhsky District, Ivanovo Oblast, Russia. Population: 24 (2010 census);

== Geography ==
This rural locality is located 3 kilometres (1.9 mi) from Palekh (the district's administrative centre), 56 kilometres (35 mi) from Ivanovo (capital of Ivanovo Oblast) and 282 kilometres (175 mi) from Moscow. Krasnoye is the nearest rural locality.
