= Potanino, Palekhsky District, Ivanovo Oblast =

Potanino Потанино
- Village
- Location within Ivanovo Oblast Location within Russia
- Coordinates: 56°49′N 41°42′E
- Country: Russia
- Region: Ivanovo Oblast
- District: Palekhsky District
- Time zone: UTC+3:00

Potanino (Russian: Потанино) is a rural locality (a village) in Palekhsky District, Ivanovo Oblast, Russia. Population: 7 (2010 census);

== Geography ==
This rural locality is located 9 kilometres (5.6 mi) from Palekh (the district's administrative centre), 49 kilometres (30 mi) from Ivanovo (capital of Ivanovo Oblast) and 275 kilometres (171 mi) from Moscow. Dorki-Malye is the nearest rural locality.
