= Potanino, Republic of Buryatia =

Potanino Потанино
- Settlement
- Location within Republic of Buryatia Location within Russia
- Coordinates: 50°48′N 108°09′E
- Country: Russia
- Region: Republic of Buryatia
- District: Bichursky District
- Time zone: UTC+8:00

Potanino (Russian: Потанино) is a rural locality (a settlement) and the administrative centre of Potaninskoye Rural Settlement, Bichursky District, Republic of Buryatia, Russia. The population was 850 as of 2017. There are 15 streets.

== Geography ==
Potanino is located 60 km northeast of Bichura (the district's administrative centre) by road. Novaya Zardama is the nearest rural locality.
