= Potanino, Vologodsky District, Vologda Oblast =

Potanino Потанино
- Village
- Location within Vologda Oblast Location within Russia
- Coordinates: 59°24′N 39°40′E
- Country: Russia
- Region: Vologda Oblast
- District: Vologodsky District
- Time zone: UTC+3:00

Potanino (Russian: Потанино) is a rural locality (a village) in Kubenskoye Rural Settlement, Vologodsky District, Vologda Oblast, Russia. The population was 2 as of 2002.

== Geography ==
Potanino is located 29 km north of Vologda (the district's administrative centre) by road. Musino is the nearest rural locality.
