= Palekh =

Palekh Палех
- Urban-type settlement
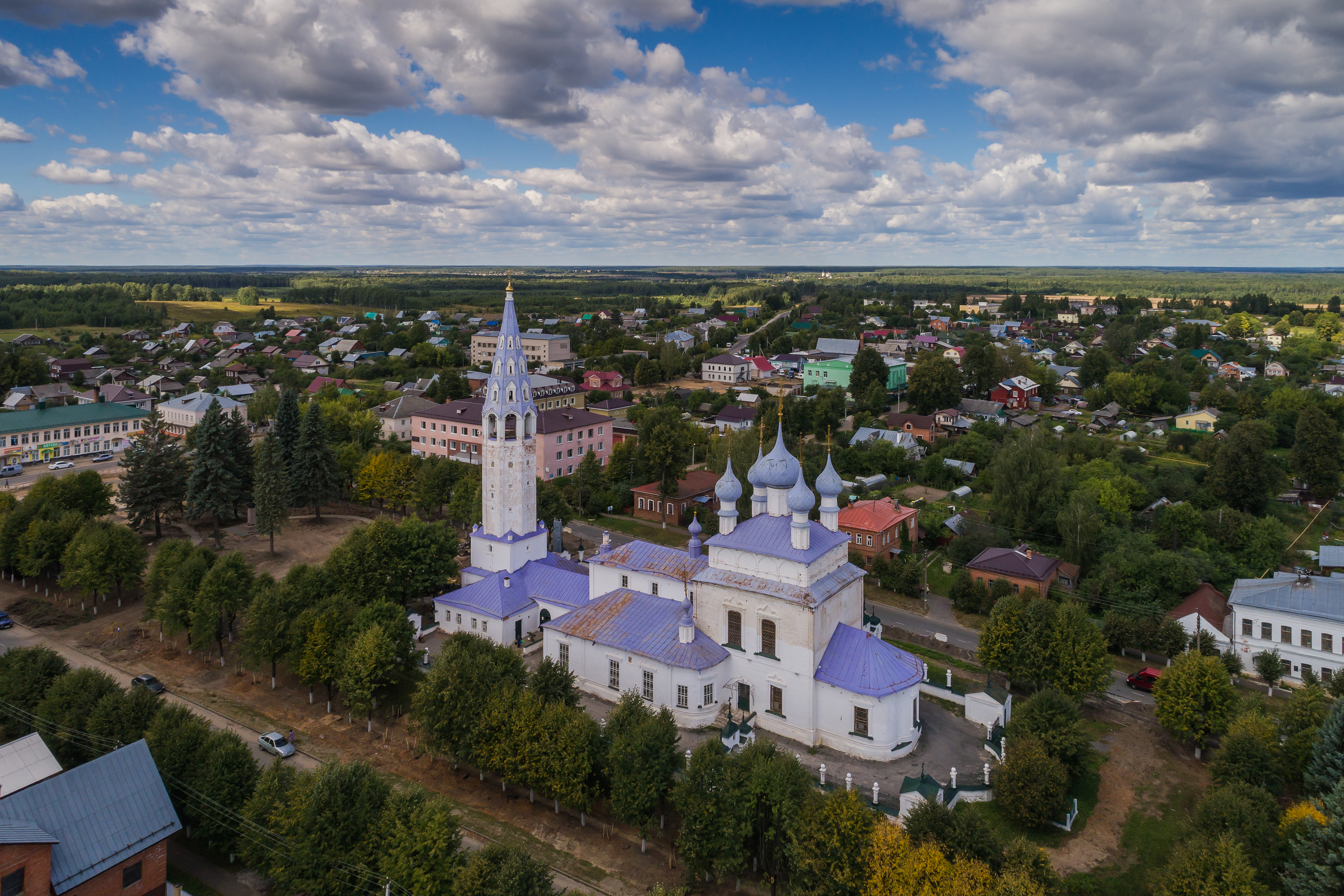
- General view of the town

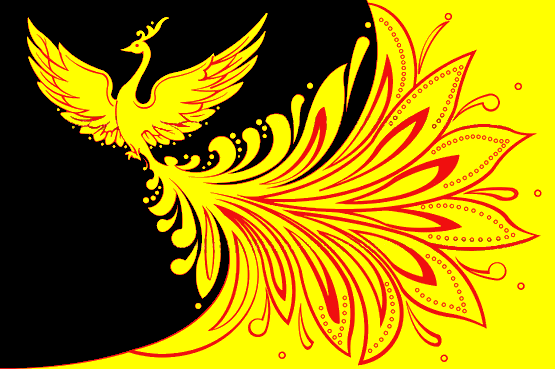
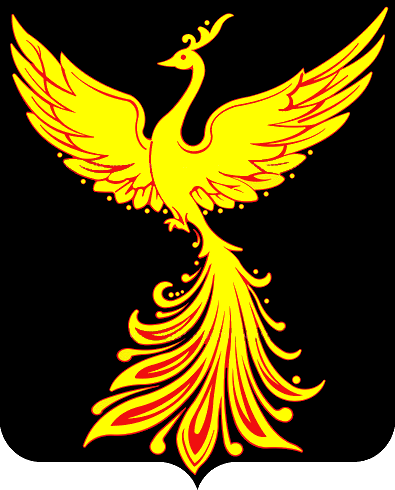
- Flag Coat of arms
- Interactive map of Palekh
- Location of Palekh Palekh (Ivanovo Oblast)
- Coordinates: 56°48′0″N 41°51′30″E
- Country: Russia
- Federal subject: Ivanovo Oblast
- Administrative district: Palekhsky District
- Elevation: 117 m (384 ft)

Population (2010 Census)
  - Total: 5,337
  - Estimate (2025): 4,368 (−18.2%)
- Time zone: UTC+3 (MSK)
- Postal code: 155620
- OKTMO ID: 24617151051

Palekh (Russian: Па́лех) is an urban locality (a settlement) and the administrative center of Palekhsky District in Ivanovo Oblast, Russia. Population: 4,633 (2021 census); 5,337 (2010 census); 5,814 (2002 census); 6,202 (1989 Soviet census).
