= Palekhsky District =

Palekhsky District Палехский район (Russian)
- District
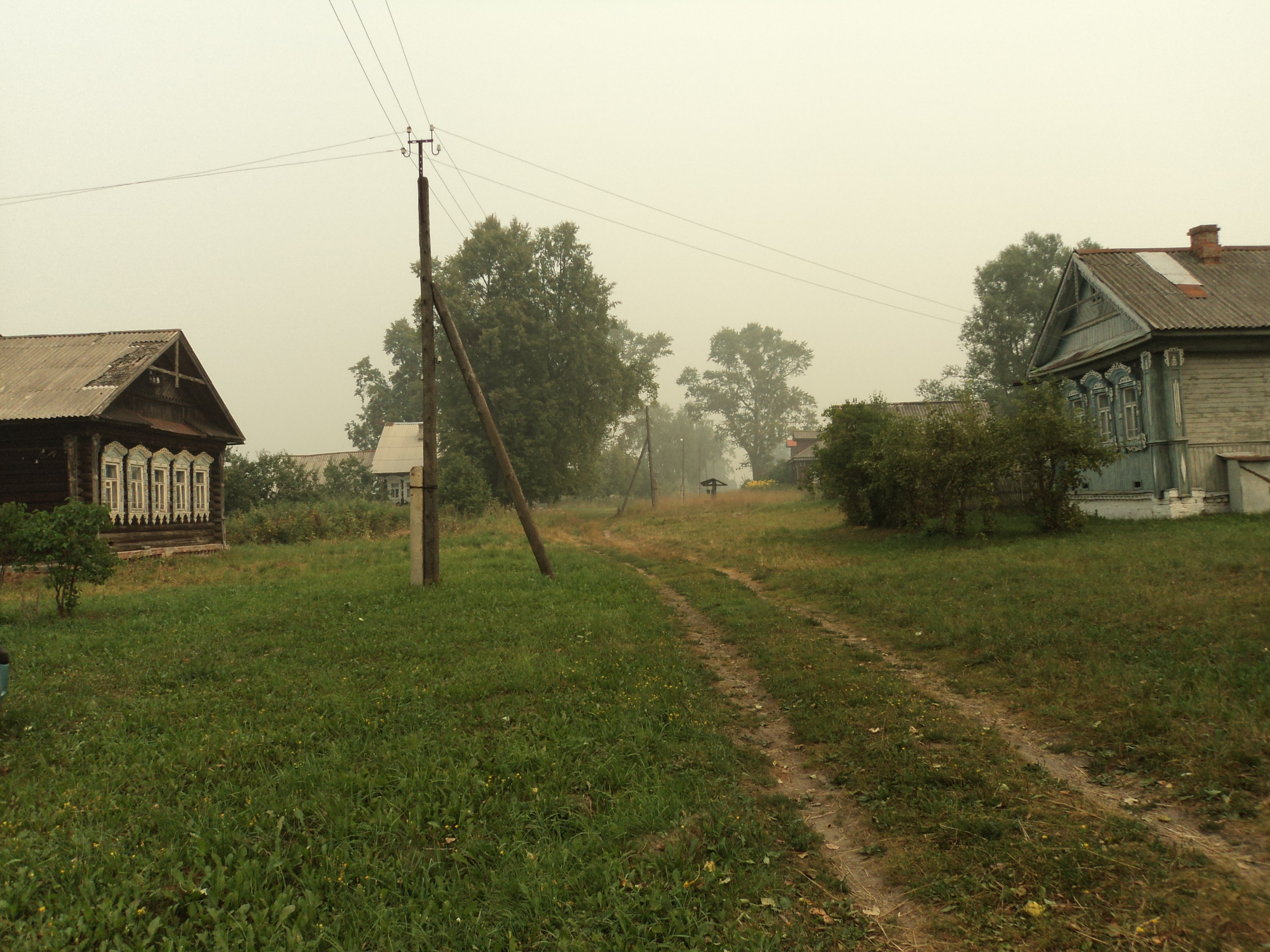
- The village of Potanino in Palekhsky District

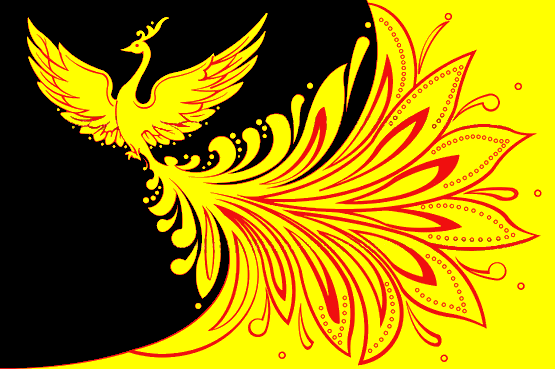
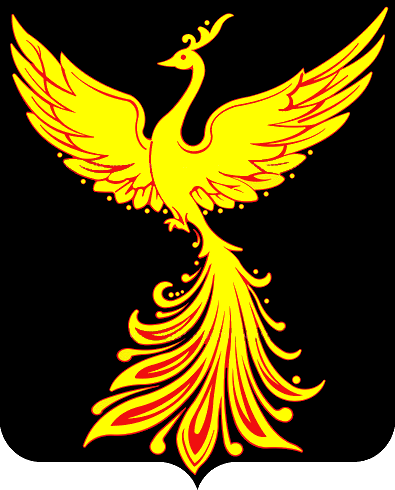
- Flag Coat of arms
- Location of Palekhsky District in Ivanovo Oblast
- Coordinates: 56°48′N 41°52′E
- Country: Russia
- Federal subject: Ivanovo Oblast
- Established: 25 January 1935
- Administrative center: Palekh

Area
  - Total: 853 km^{2} (329 sq mi)

Population (2010 Census)
  - Total: 10,884
  - Density: 12.8/km^{2} (33.0/sq mi)
  - Urban: 49.0%
  - Rural: 51.0%

Administrative structure
  - Inhabited localities: 123 rural localities

Municipal structure
  - Municipally incorporated as: Palekhsky Municipal District
  - Municipal divisions: 1 urban settlements, 3 rural settlements
- Time zone: UTC+3 (MSK)
- OKTMO ID: 24617000
- Website: http://palekhmr.ru/

Palekhsky District (Russian: Па́лехский райо́н) is an administrative and municipal district (raion), one of the twenty-one in Ivanovo Oblast, Russia. It is located in the center of the oblast. The area of the district is 853 square kilometers (329 sq mi). Its administrative center is the urban locality (a settlement) of Palekh. Population: 8,947 (2021 census); 10,884 (2010 census); 12,791 (2002 Census); 14,662 (1989 Soviet census). The population of Palekh accounts for 51.8% of the district's total population.
