= Administrative divisions of Tula Oblast =

Tula Oblast Russia
- Administrative center: Tula

Administrative structure (as of 2014)
- Districts: 23
- Cities/towns: 20
- Urban-type settlements: 11
- Rural administrations, rural okrugs, rural territories, and volosts: 351

Municipal structure (as of 2002)
- Rural settlements: 3,368 (inhabited); 284 (uninhabited)

The following is a list of Administrative divisions of Tula Oblast.

== Administrative and municipal divisions ==
  - Tula (Тула) (administrative center)
    - City districts:
      - Privokzalny (Привокзальный)
      - Proletarsky (Пролетарский)
      - Sovetsky (Советский)
      - Tsentralny (Центральный)
      - Zarechensky (Зареченский)
  - Donskoy (Донской)
  - Shchyokino (Щёкино)
    - Urban-type settlements under the town's jurisdiction:
      - Pervomaysky (Первомайский)
- Districts:
  - Aleksinsky (Алексинский)
    - Towns under the district's jurisdiction:
      - Aleksin (Алексин)
    - Urban-type settlements under the district's jurisdiction:
      - Novogurovsky (Новогуровский)
    - with 13 rural okrugs under the district's jurisdiction.
  - Arsenyevsky (Арсеньевский)
    - Urban-type settlements under the district's jurisdiction:
      - Arsenyevo (Арсеньево)
      - Slavny (Славный)
    - with 13 rural okrugs under the district's jurisdiction.
  - Belyovsky (Белёвский)
    - Towns under the district's jurisdiction:
      - Belyov (Белёв)
    - with 16 rural okrugs under the district's jurisdiction.
  - Bogoroditsky (Богородицкий)
    - Towns under the district's jurisdiction:
      - Bogoroditsk (Богородицк)
    - with 14 rural okrugs under the district's jurisdiction.
  - Chernsky (Чернский)
    - Urban-type settlements under the district's jurisdiction:
      - Chern (Чернь)
    - with 24 rural administrations under the district's jurisdiction.
  - Dubensky (Дубенский)
    - Urban-type settlements under the district's jurisdiction:
      - Dubna (Дубна)
    - with 7 rural okrugs under the district's jurisdiction.
  - Kamensky (Каменский)
    - with 10 rural okrugs under the district's jurisdiction.
  - Kimovsky (Кимовский)
    - Towns under the district's jurisdiction:
      - Kimovsk (Кимовск)
    - with 19 rural okrugs under the district's jurisdiction.
  - Kireyevsky (Киреевский)
    - Towns under the district's jurisdiction:
      - Bolokhovo (Болохово)
      - Kireyevsk (Киреевск)
      - Lipki (Липки)
    - with 12 rural okrugs under the district's jurisdiction.
  - Kurkinsky (Куркинский)
    - Urban-type settlements under the district's jurisdiction:
      - Kurkino (Куркино)
    - with 8 volosts under the district's jurisdiction.
  - Leninsky (Ленинский)
    - with 17 rural okrugs under the district's jurisdiction.
  - Novomoskovsky (Новомосковский)
    - Towns under the district's jurisdiction:
      - Novomoskovsk (Новомосковск)
      - Sokolniki (Сокольники)
    - with 13 rural okrugs under the district's jurisdiction.
  - Odoyevsky (Одоевский)
    - Urban-type settlements under the district's jurisdiction:
      - Odoyev (Одоев)
    - with 12 rural administrations under the district's jurisdiction.
  - Plavsky (Плавский)
    - Towns under the district's jurisdiction:
      - Plavsk (Плавск)
    - with 13 rural okrugs under the district's jurisdiction.
  - Shchyokinsky (Щёкинский)
    - Towns under the district's jurisdiction:
      - Sovetsk (Советск)
    - with 21 rural administrations under the district's jurisdiction.
  - Suvorovsky (Суворовский)
    - Towns under the district's jurisdiction:
      - Chekalin (Чекалин)
      - Suvorov (Суворов)
    - with 17 rural territories under the district's jurisdiction.
  - Tyoplo-Ogaryovsky (Тёпло-Огарёвский)
    - Urban-type settlements under the district's jurisdiction:
      - Tyoploye (Тёплое)
    - with 18 rural okrugs under the district's jurisdiction.
  - Uzlovsky (Узловский)
    - Towns under the district's jurisdiction:
      - Uzlovaya (Узловая)
    - with 17 rural administrations under the district's jurisdiction.
  - Venyovsky (Венёвский)
    - Towns under the district's jurisdiction:
      - Venyov (Венёв)
    - with 19 rural okrugs under the district's jurisdiction.
  - Volovsky (Воловский)
    - Urban-type settlements under the district's jurisdiction:
      - Volovo (Волово)
    - with 13 rural okrugs under the district's jurisdiction.
  - Yasnogorsky (Ясногорский)
    - Towns under the district's jurisdiction:
      - Yasnogorsk (Ясногорск)
    - with 19 rural territories under the district's jurisdiction.
  - Yefremovsky (Ефремовский)
    - Towns under the district's jurisdiction:
      - Yefremov (Ефремов)
    - with 24 rural okrugs under the district's jurisdiction.
  - Zaoksky (Заокский)
    - Urban-type settlements under the district's jurisdiction:
      - Zaoksky (Заокский)
    - with 12 rural okrugs under the district's jurisdiction.

== See also ==
- Tula Oblast
