= Novomoskovsk constituency =

Russian legislative constituency in Tula Oblast

Novomoskovsk single-member constituency
- Constituency of the Russian State Duma

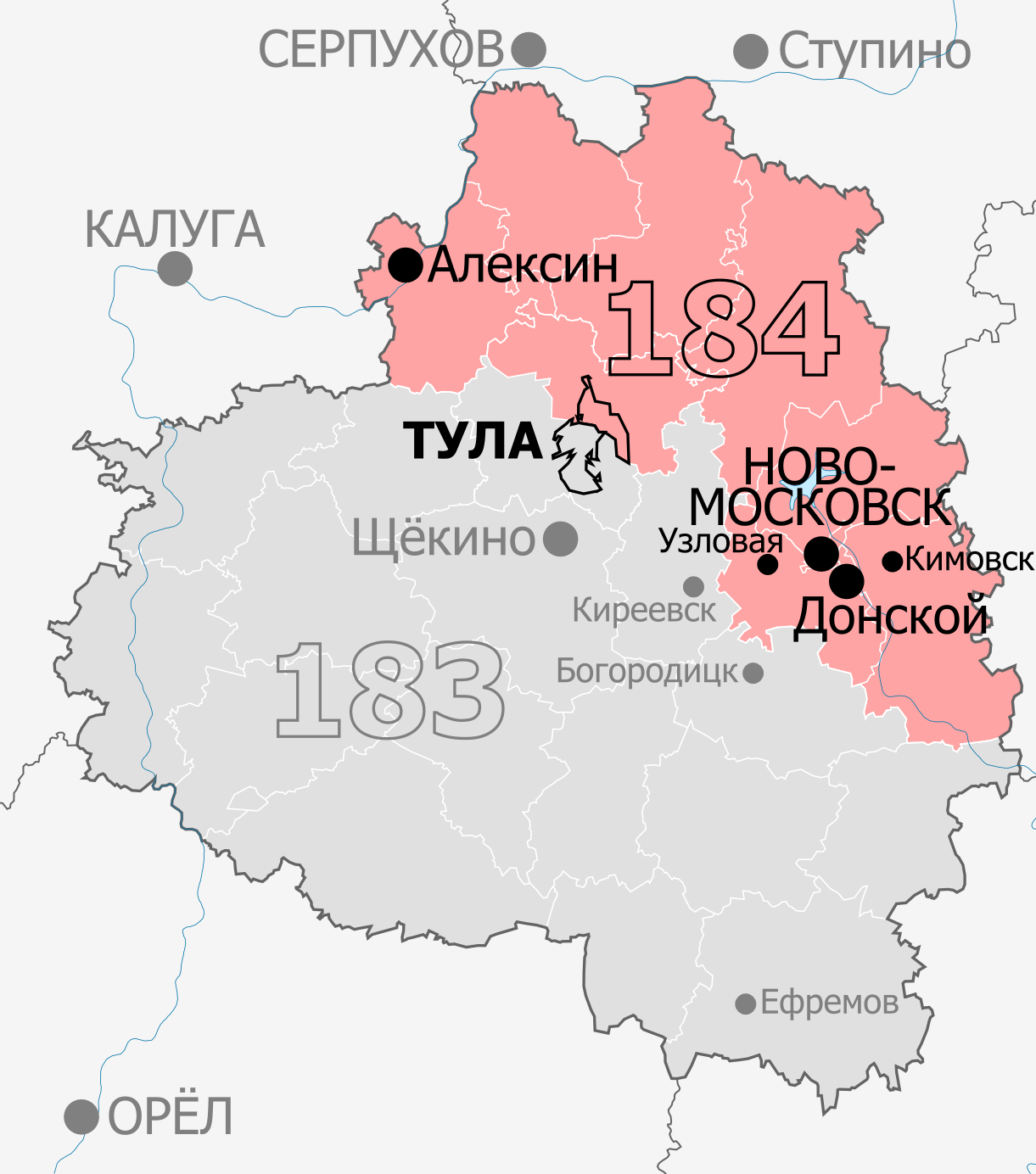
- Constituency boundaries since 2016
- Deputy: Nadezhda Shkolkina; United Russia
- Federal subject: Tula Oblast
- Districts: Aleksin, Donskoy, Kimovsky, Novogurovsky, Novomoskovsk, Tula (Proletarsky, Zarechensky), Uzlovsky, Venyovsky, Yasnogorsky, Zaoksky
- Voters: 557,765 (2026)

The Novomoskovsk constituency (No.182 (Note: No.175 in 1993-2007, No.184 in 2016–2026)) is a Russian legislative constituency in Tula Oblast. The constituency covers northern half of Tula and northern Tula Oblast, including the towns Aleksin, Donskoy, Novomoskovsk, Kimovsk and Uzlovaya.

The constituency has been represented since 2021 by United Russia deputy Nadezhda Shkolkina, former two-term State Duma member and tobacco lobbyist, who won the open seat, succeeding two-term United Russia incumbent Vladimir Afonsky.

== Boundaries ==
1993–2007: Aleksin, Aleksinsky District, Donskoy, Dubensky District, Kimovsk, Kimovsky District, Novomoskovsk, Novomoskovsky District, Uzlovaya, Uzlovsky District, Venyovsky District, Yasnogorsky District, Zaoksky District
The constituency covered northern Tula Oblast, including a major industrial city Novomoskovsk as well as towns Aleksin, Donskoy, Kimovsk and Uzlovaya.

2016–present: Aleksin, Donskoy, Kimovsky District, Novogurovsky, Novomoskovsk, Tula (Proletarsky, Zarechensky), Uzlovsky District, Venyovsky District, Yasnogorsky District, Zaoksky District
The constituency was re-created for the 2016 election and retained most of its former territory, trading only Dubensky District for northern half of Tula with Tula constituency.

== Members elected ==
Election	Member	Party
1993	Vladimir Vasilyov	Independent
1995	Zhanna Lozinskaya	Women of Russia
1999	Anatoly Artemyev	Communist Party
2003	Dmitry Savelyev	Rodina
2007	Proportional representation - no election by constituency	
2011	Proportional representation - no election by constituency	
2016	Vladimir Afonsky	United Russia
2021	Nadezhda Shkolkina	United Russia
2026	Nadezhda Shkolkina	United Russia

== Election results ==
=== 1993 ===
Summary of the 12 December 1993 Russian legislative election in the Novomoskovsk constituency
Candidate	Party	Votes	%
Vladimir Vasilyov	Independent	34,165	11.71%
Vladimir Zagorodnikov	Independent	–	8.38%
Maria Fyodorova	Independent	–	–
Valentin Gubarev	Choice of Russia	–	–
Anatoly Gurov	Agrarian Party	–	–
Viktor Krutilin	Independent	–	–
Nikolay Polishchuk	Yavlinsky–Boldyrev–Lukin	–	–
Yury Polyakov	Independent	–	–
Aleksandr Raizin	Future of Russia–New Names	–	–
Viktor Sagalayev	Independent	–	–
Aleksandr Tvirov	Independent	–	–
Nikolay Vasin	Independent	–	–
Total		291,754	100%

=== 1995 ===
Summary of the 17 December 1995 Russian legislative election in the Novomoskovsk constituency
Candidate	Party	Votes	%
Zhanna Lozinskaya	Women of Russia	53,204	16.23%
Stanislav Shedenkov	Our Home – Russia	52,038	15.87%
Viktor Krutilin	Independent	39,846	12.15%
Vyacheslav Reguzov	Communists and Working Russia - for the Soviet Union	32,367	9.87%
Aleksey Umnov	Liberal Democratic Party	28,078	8.57%
Aleksandr Berestnev	Forward, Russia!	17,246	5.26%
Vladimir Vasilyov (incumbent)	Ivan Rybkin Bloc	16,675	5.09%
Nikolay Polishchuk	Pamfilova–Gurov–Lysenko	15,719	4.80%
Vladislav Kartoshkin	People's Union	10,583	3.23%
Sergey Petrushin	Stable Russia	7,871	2.40%
Valery Bogatov	Union of Patriots	6,546	2.00%
against all		39,290	11.99%
Total		327,820	100%

=== 1999 ===
Summary of the 19 December 1999 Russian legislative election in the Novomoskovsk constituency
Candidate	Party	Votes	%
Anatoly Artemyev	Communist Party	67,742	23.95%
Aleksandr Berestnev	Union of Right Forces	18,284	6.47%
Zhanna Lozinskaya (incumbent)	Women of Russia	17,468	6.18%
Aleksandr Ivanenko	Independent	16,323	5.77%
Viktor Lebedinets	Independent	15,386	5.44%
Stanislav Shedenkov	Unity	15,021	5.31%
Vladimir Karpinsky	Independent	14,688	5.19%
Pyotr Kazachenko	Independent	14,173	5.01%
Yevgeny Mikheyev	Independent	11,543	4.08%
Oleg Khudyakov	Independent	10,071	3.56%
Vyacheslav Reguzov	Independent	8,981	3.18%
Yury Gorbunov	Peace, Labour, May	7,248	2.56%
Aleksandr Shkolny	Liberal Democratic Party	6,772	2.39%
Valery Khrustalev	Our Home – Russia	3,073	1.09%
Anatoly Siryukin	Independent	1,653	0.58%
Valery Frizen	Russian Socialist Party	875	0.31%
Vladimir Inyagin	Independent	702	0.25%
against all		45,041	15.93%
Total		282,794	100%

=== 2003 ===
Summary of the 7 December 2003 Russian legislative election in the Novomoskovsk constituency
Candidate	Party	Votes	%
Dmitry Savelyev	Rodina	52,502	23.11%
Anatoly Artemyev (incumbent)	Communist Party	47,965	21.12%
Yevgeny Mikheyev	United Russia	45,881	20.20%
Aleksey Popov	Independent	10,485	4.62%
Igor Ivantsov	Independent	9,422	4.15%
Aleksey Umnov	Liberal Democratic Party	8,973	3.95%
Mikhail Ivantsov	People's Party	6,345	2.79%
Aleksandr Berestnev	New Course — Automobile Russia	4,741	2.09%
Nikolay Miroshnik	United Russian Party Rus'	1,412	0.62%
against all		34,641	15.25%
Total		227,230	100%

=== 2016 ===
Summary of the 18 September 2016 Russian legislative election in the Novomoskovsk constituency
Candidate	Party	Votes	%
Vladimir Afonsky	United Russia	139,658	51.60%
Oleg Lebedev	Communist Party	40,754	15.06%
Aleksandr Balberov	Liberal Democratic Party	25,799	9.53%
Sergey Grebenshchikov	A Just Russia	17,740	6.55%
Ildar Abdulganiyev	Communists of Russia	7,767	2.87%
Aleksey Novgorodov	Rodina	7,721	2.85%
Anastasia Zhukova	Party of Growth	6,746	2.49%
Yelena Konovalova	Yabloko	5,984	2.21%
Roman Yefremov	People's Freedom Party	4,721	1.74%
Mikhail Seregin	The Greens	3,373	1.25%
Total		270,664	100%

=== 2021 ===
Summary of the 17-19 September 2021 Russian legislative election in the Novomoskovsk constituency
Candidate	Party	Votes	%
Nadezhda Shkolkina	United Russia	139,494	47.29%
Vladimir Isakov	Communist Party	40,521	13.74%
Sergey Grebenshchikov	A Just Russia — For Truth	29,674	10.06%
Denis Ilyukhin	Communists of Russia	15,609	5.29%
Maksim Tokayev	New People	14,483	4.91%
Nikolay Ogoltsov	Party of Pensioners	13,462	4.56%
Aleksandr Marinkov	Liberal Democratic Party	11,222	3.80%
Yulia Morozova	Yabloko	7,431	2.52%
Dmitry Shatrov	Rodina	5,582	1.89%
Aleksey Makoseyev	The Greens	5,506	1.87%
Total		294,962	100%

=== 2026 ===
Summary of the 18-20 September 2026 Russian legislative election in the Novomoskovsk constituency
Candidate	Party	Votes	%
Nadezhda Shkolkina (incumbent)	United Russia	120,890	42.60%
Vladimir Isakov	Communist Party	41,062	14.47%
Sergey Grebenshchikov	A Just Russia	29,902	10.54%
Aleksandr Balberov	Liberal Democratic Party	28,542	10.06%
Valentin Soin	New People	21,885	7.71%
Yury Moiseyev	Party of Pensioners	15,747	5.55%
Kira Kalinicheva	Yabloko	10,823	3.81%
Aleksey Grinevich	Rodina	9,381	3.31%
Total		283,808	100%
