= Kireyevsky =

Also transliterated as "Kireevsky" Kireyevsky (masculine), Kireyevskaya (feminine), or Kireyevskoye (neuter) may refer to:

- Kireyevsky District, a district of Tula Oblast, Russia
- Kireyevsky (rural locality), a rural locality (a khutor) in Volgograd Oblast, Russia
- Kireyevskoye, a rural locality (a village) in Tula Oblast, Russia
- Ivan Vasilyevich Kireyevsky (1806–1856) Russian literary critic and philosopher

== See also ==
- Kireyevsk, a town in Tula Oblast, Russia
- Kireyevskoye-Pervoye, a rural locality (a village) in Kaluga Oblast
- Kireyevskoye-Vtoroye, a rural locality (a village) in Kaluga Oblast
