= Medvenka =

Medvenka (Russian: Медвенка) is the name of several inhabited localities in Russia.

Urban localities

- Medvenka, Kursk Oblast, a work settlement in Medvensky District of Kursk Oblast

Rural localities

- Medvenka, Kireyevsky District, Tula Oblast, a village in Dedilovsky Rural Okrug of Kireyevsky District of Tula Oblast
- Medvenka, Leninsky District, Tula Oblast, a village in Medvensky Rural Okrug of Leninsky District of Tula Oblast
