= Volovsky District =

One of two districts in Russia

Location of Lipetsk Oblast in Russia

Location of Tula Oblast in Russia

Volovsky District is the name of several administrative and municipal districts in Russia.

- Volovsky District, Lipetsk Oblast, an administrative and municipal district of Lipetsk Oblast
- Volovsky District, Tula Oblast, an administrative and municipal district of Tula Oblast
