= Volovo, Russia =

Volovo (Russian: Волово) is the name of several inhabited localities in Russia.

Urban localities

- Volovo, Volovsky District, Tula Oblast, a work settlement in Volovsky District of Tula Oblast

Rural localities

- Volovo, Arkhangelsk Oblast, a village in Kenoretsky Selsoviet of Plesetsky District of Arkhangelsk Oblast
- Volovo, Lipetsk Oblast, a selo in Volovsky Selsoviet of Volovsky District of Lipetsk Oblast
- Volovo, Moscow Oblast, a village in Pyshlitskoye Rural Settlement of Shatursky District of Moscow Oblast
- Volovo, Novosibirsk Oblast, a village in Tatarsky District of Novosibirsk Oblast
- Volovo, Ryazan Oblast, a village in Beregovskoy Rural Okrug of Putyatinsky District of Ryazan Oblast
- Volovo, Sadovy Rural Okrug, Volovsky District, Tula Oblast, a selo in Sadovy Rural Okrug of Volovsky District of Tula Oblast
- Volovo, Tver Oblast, a village in Oleninsky District of Tver Oblast
