= Sokolniki, Russia =

Sokolniki (Russian: Сокольники) is the name of several rural localities in Russia.

== Modern localities ==
- Sokolniki, Gvardeysky District, Kaliningrad Oblast, a settlement in Slavinsky Rural Okrug of Gvardeysky District in Kaliningrad Oblast
- Sokolniki, Zelenogradsky District, Kaliningrad Oblast, a settlement in Kovrovsky Rural Okrug of Zelenogradsky District in Kaliningrad Oblast
- Sokolniki, Kemerovo Oblast, a settlement in Proskokovskaya Rural Territory of Yurginsky District in Kemerovo Oblast; 55°52′N 84°38′E
- Sokolniki, Kurgan Oblast, a village in Suleymanovsky Selsoviet of Safakulevsky District in Kurgan Oblast; 54°49′N 62°37′E
- Sokolniki, Leningrad Oblast, a village in Oredezhskoye Settlement Municipal Formation of Luzhsky District in Leningrad Oblast; 58°48′N 30°18′E
- Sokolniki, Dmitrovsky District, Moscow Oblast, a village in Gabovskoye Rural Settlement of Dmitrovsky District in Moscow Oblast; 56°12′N 37°21′E
- Sokolniki, Istrinsky District, Moscow Oblast, a village in Yermolinskoye Rural Settlement of Istrinsky District in Moscow Oblast; 55°57′N 36°54′E
- Sokolniki, Smolensk Oblast, a village in Molkovskoye Rural Settlement of Kardymovsky District in Smolensk Oblast
- Sokolniki, Tambov Oblast, a selo in Kryukovsky Selsoviet of Morshansky District in Tambov Oblast
- Sokolniki, Tver Oblast, a settlement in Sokolnicheskoye Rural Settlement of Kuvshinovsky District in Tver Oblast
- Sokolniki, Vologda Oblast, a village in Nikolo-Ramensky Selsoviet of Cherepovetsky District in Vologda Oblast

== Abolished localities ==
- Sokolniki, Tula Oblast, a former town in Novomoskovsky District of Tula Oblast; merged into the town of Novomoskovsk in October 2008

== Alternative names ==
- Sokolniki, alternative name of Sokolnikovo, a village under the administrative jurisdiction of Domodedovo Town Under Oblast Jurisdiction in Moscow Oblast; 55°9′N 37°37′E
- Sokolniki, alternative name of Sokolnikovo, a selo in Yurlovskoye Rural Settlement of Mozhaysky District in Moscow Oblast; 55°21′N 35°48′E
