= Kimovsky District =

Kimovsky District Кимовский район (Russian)
- District
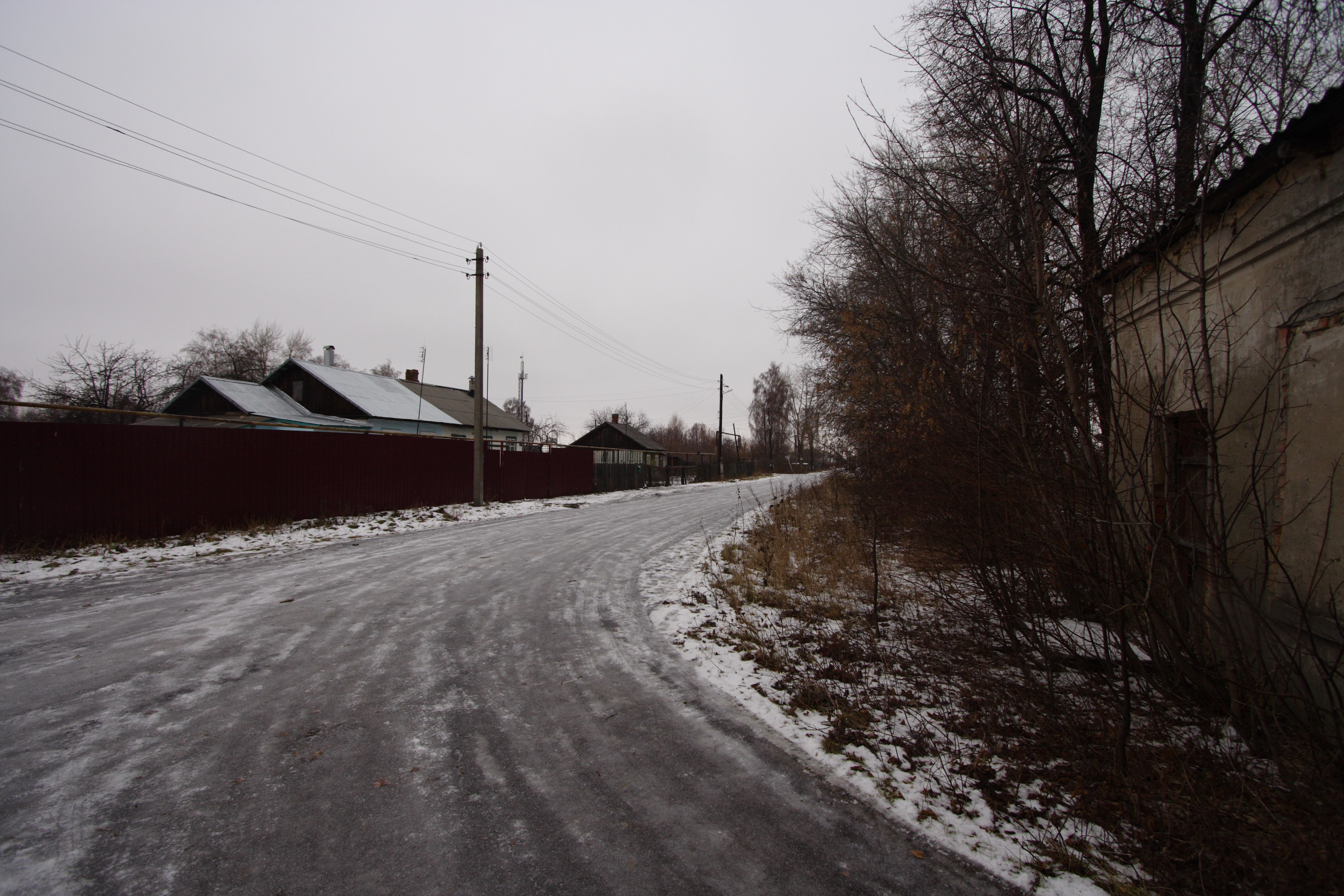
- The settlement of Novolvovsk in Kimovsky District

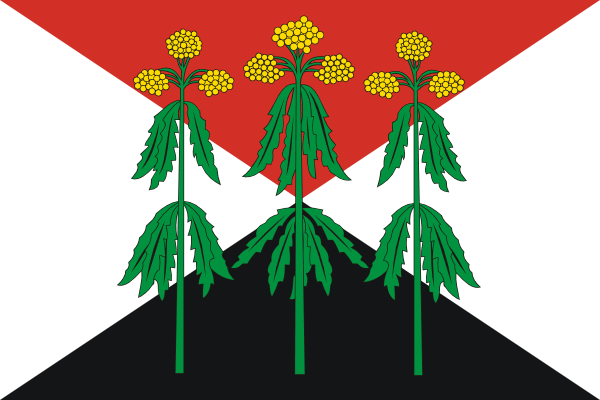
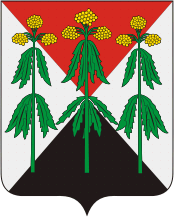
- Flag Coat of arms
- Location of Kimovsky District in Tula Oblast
- Coordinates: 53°58′00″N 38°32′00″E
- Country: Russia
- Federal subject: Tula Oblast
- Established: 21 March 1924
- Administrative center: Kimovsk

Area
  - Total: 1,112 km^{2} (429 sq mi)

Population (2010 Census)
  - Total: 42,853
  - Density: 38.54/km^{2} (99.81/sq mi)
  - Urban: 75.7%
  - Rural: 24.3%

Administrative structure
  - Administrative divisions: 1 Towns under district jurisdiction, 19 Rural okrugs
  - Inhabited localities: 1 cities/towns, 150 rural localities

Municipal structure
  - Municipally incorporated as: Kimovsky Municipal District
  - Municipal divisions: 1 urban settlements, 2 rural settlements
- Time zone: UTC+3 (MSK)
- OKTMO ID: 70626000
- Website: http://www.admkimovsk.ru/

Kimovsky District (Russian: Ки́мовский райо́н) is an administrative district (raion), one of the twenty-three in Tula Oblast, Russia. As a municipal division, it is incorporated as Kimovsky Municipal District. It is located in the east of the oblast. The area of the district is 1,112 square kilometers (429 sq mi). Its administrative center is the town of Kimovsk. Population: 42,853 (2010 Census); 17,116 (2002 census); 20,480 (1989 Soviet census). The population of Kimovsk accounts for 66.5% of the district's total population.

== Geography ==
Kimovsky District is located in the east of Tula Oblast, bordering Ryazan Oblast to the east. It is on hilly terrain in the central Russian Plain. The upper reaches of the Don River (Russia) run along the Kimovsky's western border (the headwaters of the Don are immediately to the northwest). The district is 77 km east of the city of Tula, and about 200 km south of Moscow. The elevation ranges from 100 meters in the river valleys to 234 meters in the heights. The area is in the transition zone between the steppe vegetation and climate to the south, and the forest-steppe vegetation to the north; 4% of the district is forested. The area measures 45 km (north-south), and 20 km (west-east). The administrative center is the town of Kimovsk.

The district is bordered on the north by Novomoskovsky District, on the east by Mikhaylovsky District (Ryazan Oblast) and Skopinsky District (Ryazan Oblast), on the south by Kurkinsky District and Uzlovsky District, and on the west by Bogoroditsky District.
