= Bolokhovo =

Town in Tula Oblast, Russia

Bolokhovo Болохово
- Town
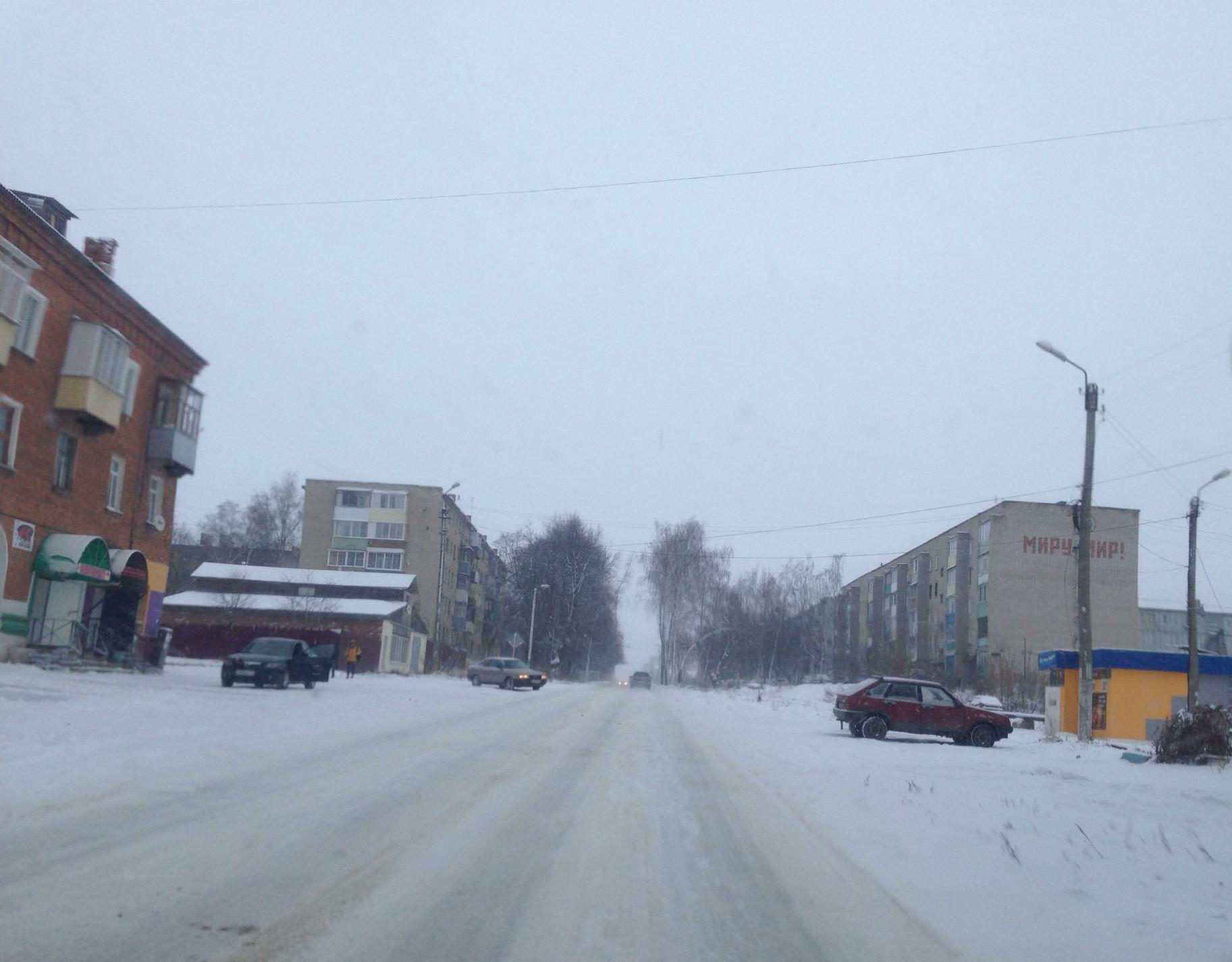
- Bolokhovo in 2016

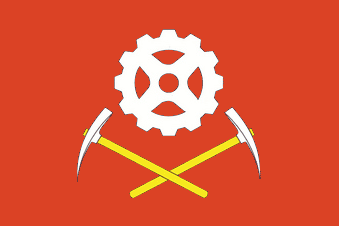
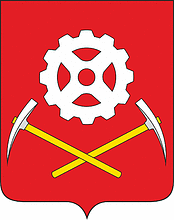
- Flag Coat of arms
- Interactive map of Bolokhovo
- Location of Bolokhovo Bolokhovo (Tula Oblast)
- Coordinates: 54°05′N 37°50′E
- Country: Russia
- Federal subject: Tula Oblast
- Administrative district: Kireyevsky District
- Town under district jurisdictionSelsoviet: Bolokhovo
- Town status since: 1943
- Elevation: 210 m (690 ft)

Population (2010 Census)
  - Total: 9,622
  - Estimate (2021): 9,339 (−2.9%)

Administrative status
  - Capital of: Bolokhovo Town Under District Jurisdiction

Municipal status
  - Municipal district: Kireyevsky Municipal District
  - Urban settlement: Bolokhovo Urban Settlement
  - Capital of: Bolokhovo Urban Settlement
- Time zone: UTC+3 (MSK)
- Postal code: 301280
- OKTMO ID: 70628108001

Bolokhovo (Russian: Бо́лохово) is a town in Kireyevsky District of Tula Oblast, Russia, located on the Olen River (Oka's basin), 20 kilometers (12 mi) southeast of Tula, the administrative center of the oblast. Population: 9,622 (2010 census); 10,364 (2002 census); 11,787 (1989 Soviet census).

== History ==
Bolokhovo was granted town status in 1943.

== Local government ==
The representative body of local self-government is the assembly of deputies. It consists of 10 deputies elected in municipal elections in single-mandate constituencies for a term of three years. According to the results of the elections on 9 September 2018, 9 mandates were occupied by members of the United Russia party, 1 by the Liberal Democratic Party of Russia, 1 by the Cossack Party of the Russian Federation, and 1 refused powers. In the last main elections the turnout was 30%. The meeting of deputies is headed by the head of the municipality, who is elected by deputies from among its members, also for a period of three years. Since 20 September 2018, the head of the municipality has been Yelena Nikolayevna Nefedova.

== Administrative and municipal status ==
Within the framework of administrative divisions, it is incorporated within Kireyevsky District as Bolokhovo Town Under District Jurisdiction. As a municipal division, Bolokhovo Town Under District Jurisdiction is incorporated within Kireyevsky Municipal District as Bolokhovo Urban Settlement.
