= Volovo =

Volovo may refer to:

- Volovo, Bulgaria, an inhabited locality in Borovo Municipality of Ruse Province, Bulgaria
- Volovo, Russia, name of several inhabited localities in Russia
