= Pervomaysky, Tula Oblast =

Pervomaysky Первомайский
- Urban-type settlement
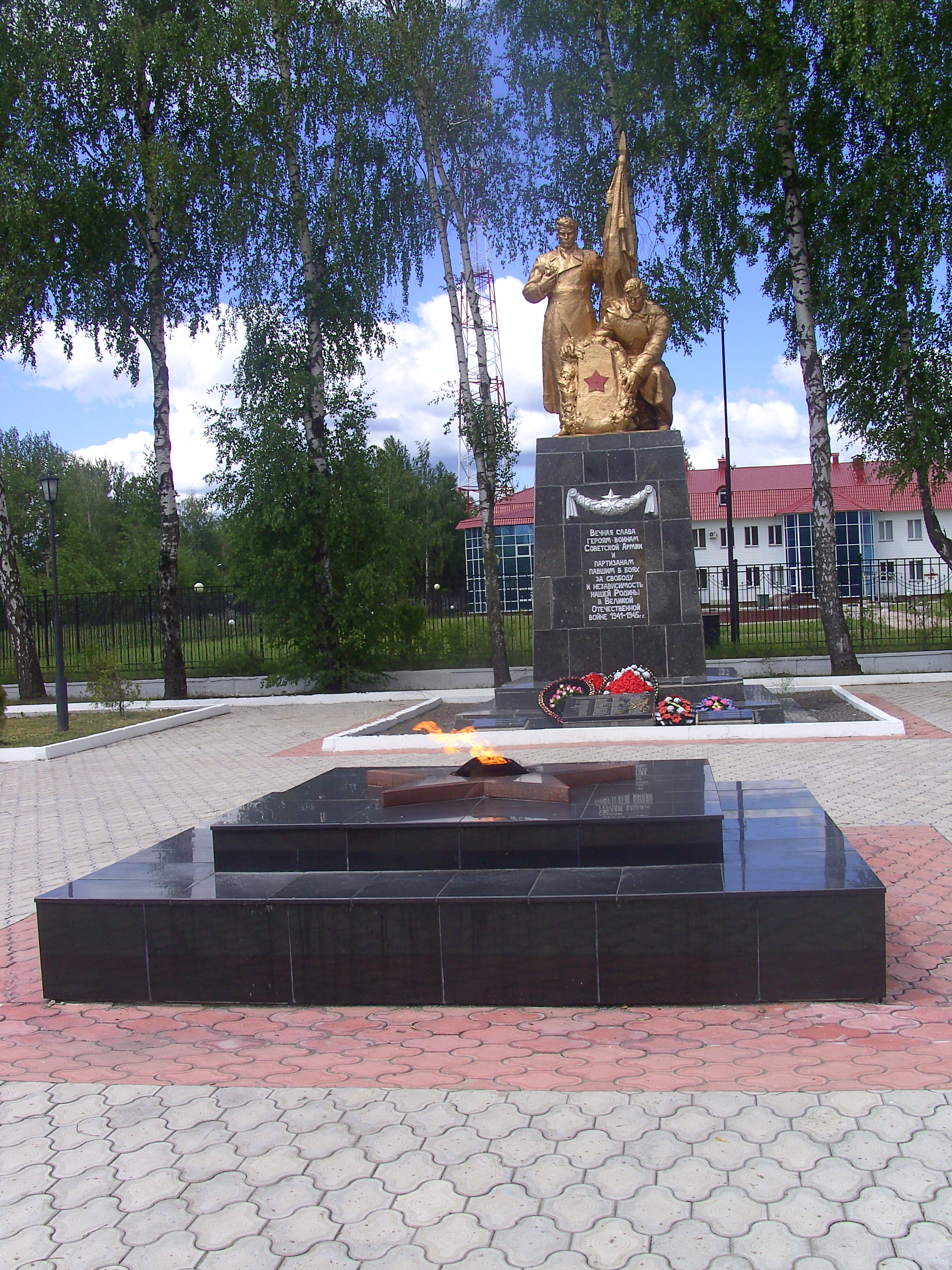

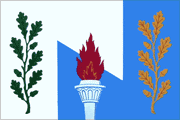
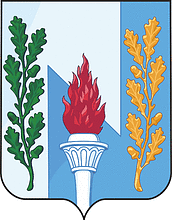
- Flag Coat of arms
- Interactive map of Pervomaysky
- Location of Pervomaysky Pervomaysky (Tula Oblast)
- Coordinates: 54.0381°N 37.5074°E
- Country: Russia
- Federal subject: Tula Oblast
- Administrative district: Shchyokinsky District
- Founded: 1946
- Elevation: 240 m (790 ft)

Population (2010 Census)
  - Total: 10,058
  - Estimate (2021): 10,234 (+1.7%)
- Time zone: UTC+3 (MSK)
- Postal code: 301212
- OKTMO ID: 70648154051

Pervomaysky (Russian: Первомайский) is an urban locality (an urban-type settlement) in Shchyokinsky District of Tula Oblast, Russia. Population: 10,058 (2010 census); 11,264 (2002 census); 12,536 (1989 Soviet census).
