= Nadezhda Shkolkina =

Russian politician

- Надежда Школкина
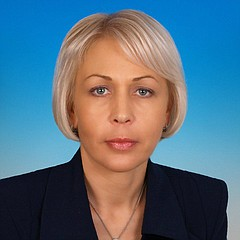

Member of the State Duma for Tula Oblast
- Incumbent
- Assumed office 12 October 2021
- Preceded by: Vladimir Afonsky
- Constituency: Novomoskovsk (No. 184)

Member of the State Duma (Party List Seat)
- In office 24 December 2007 – 5 October 2016

Personal details
- Born: 12 May 1970 (age 56) Saransk, Mordovian ASSR, Russian SFSR, USSR
- Party: United Russia
- Education: Russian University of Cooperation

Nadezhda Vasilievna Shkolkina (Russian: Надежда Васильевна Школкина; 12 May 1970, Saransk) is a Russian political figure and deputy of the 5th, 6th, and 8th State Dumas. In 2010, she was granted a Candidate of Sciences in Economics degree.

From 1992 to 1998, Shkolkina worked in various commercial enterprises. In 2006-2010, she headed Public Council under the Ministry of Agriculture. From 2010 to 2011, she was a member of the Civic Chamber of the Russian Federation. In 2007, she joined the United Russia. In 2007, 2011, and 2021, Shkolkina was elected deputy of the 5th, 6th, and 8th State Dumas, respectively.

In 2013, Dissernet accused Shkolkina of plagiarizing parts of her Candidate of Sciences dissertation.

== Sanctions ==
She was sanctioned by the UK government in 2022 in relation to the Russo-Ukrainian War.
