= Sokolniki =

Sokolniki is the name of the following places:

== Poland ==
- Gmina Sokolniki, a gmina in Łódź Voivodeship
- Sokolniki, Dzierżoniów County, Lower Silesian Voivodeship, a village in southwestern Poland
- Sokolniki, Gmina Udanin, Środa County, Lower Silesian Voivodeship, a village in southwestern Poland
- Sokolniki, Wrocław County, Lower Silesian Voivodeship, a village in southwestern Poland
- Sokolniki, Wieruszów County in Łódź Voivodeship (central Poland)
- Sokolniki, Zgierz County in Łódź Voivodeship (central Poland)
- Sokolniki, Podkarpackie Voivodeship (southeast Poland)
- Sokolniki, Garwolin County in Masovian Voivodeship (east-central Poland)
- Sokolniki, Płock County in Masovian Voivodeship (east-central Poland)
- Sokolniki, Gniezno County in Greater Poland Voivodeship (west-central Poland)
- Sokolniki, Września County in Greater Poland Voivodeship (west-central Poland)
- Sokolniki, Silesian Voivodeship (south Poland)
- Sokolniki, Opole Voivodeship (southwest Poland)
- Sokolniki, Goleniów County in West Pomeranian Voivodeship (northwest Poland)
- Sokolniki, Pyrzyce County in West Pomeranian Voivodeship (northwest Poland)

== Russia ==
- Sokolniki District, a district of Eastern Administrative Okrug in the federal city of Moscow
- Sokolniki, Russia, several rural localities
- Sokolniki Arena, an indoor sporting facility in Moscow
- Sokolniki Park, a park in northeastern Moscow
- Sokolniki (Sokolnicheskaya line), a station on the Sokolnicheskaya Line of the Moscow Metro
- Sokolniki (Bolshaya Koltsevaya line), a prospective station of the Moscow Metro, Line 11
