= Dubensky District, Tula Oblast =

Dubensky District Дубенский район (Russian)
- District
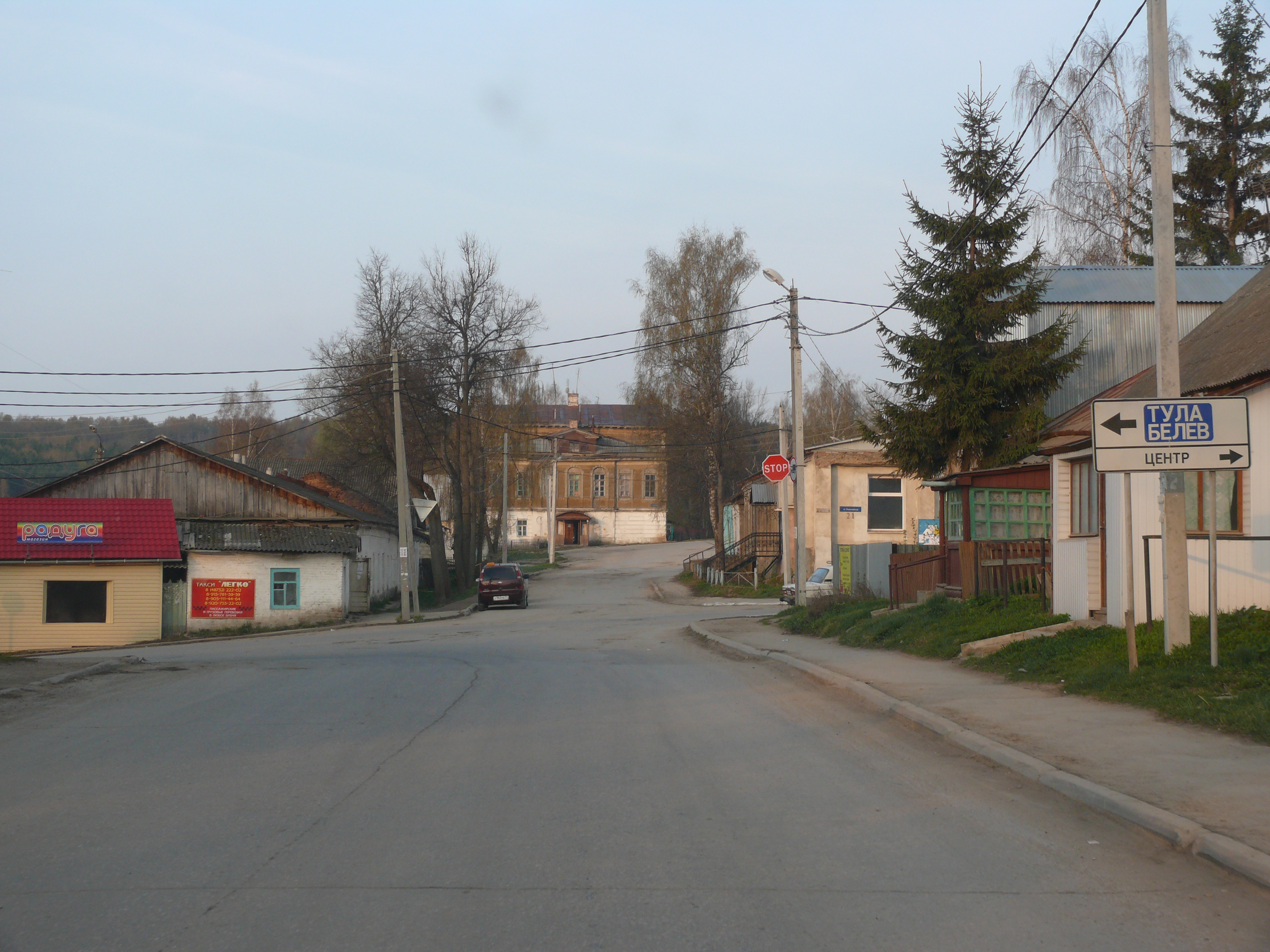
- Village of Dubna, Dubensky District

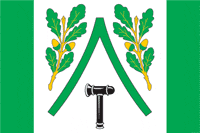
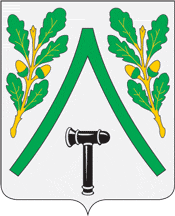
- Flag Coat of arms
- Location of Dubensky District in Tula Oblast
- Coordinates: 54°09′23″N 36°57′27″E
- Country: Russia
- Federal subject: Tula Oblast
- Established: 1924
- Administrative center: Dubna

Area
  - Total: 799 km^{2} (308 sq mi)

Population (2010 Census)
  - Total: 14,618
  - Density: 18.3/km^{2} (47.4/sq mi)
  - Urban: 40.9%
  - Rural: 59.1%

Administrative structure
  - Administrative divisions: 1 Urban-type settlements, 7 Rural okrugs
  - Inhabited localities: 1 urban-type settlements, 84 rural localities

Municipal structure
  - Municipally incorporated as: Dubensky Municipal District
  - Municipal divisions: 1 urban settlements, 2 rural settlements
- Time zone: UTC+3 (MSK)
- OKTMO ID: 70618000
- Website: http://dubna.tulobl.ru/

Dubensky District (Russian: Дубе́нский райо́н) is an administrative district (raion), one of the twenty-three in Tula Oblast, Russia. Within the framework of municipal divisions, it is incorporated as Dubensky Municipal District. It is located northwest of the oblast. The area of the district is 799 square kilometers (308 sq mi). Its administrative center is the urban locality (a work settlement) of Dubna. Population: 14,618 (2010 Census); 15,011 (2002 census); 15,130 (1989 Soviet census). The population of Dubna accounts for 40.9% of the district's total population.
