= List of chairmen of the Tula Oblast Duma =

Below is a list of office-holders in the Tula Oblast Duma:

Name	Took office	Left office
Viktor Derevyanko	1993	1996
Igor Ivanov	1996	2000
Oleg Lukichev	2000	2004
Oleg Tatarinov	2004	?
Igor Panchenko	2009	Present

== Sources ==
- Duma website
