= Tyoplo-Ogaryovsky District =

Tyoplo-Ogaryovsky District Тёпло-Огарёвский район (Russian)
- District
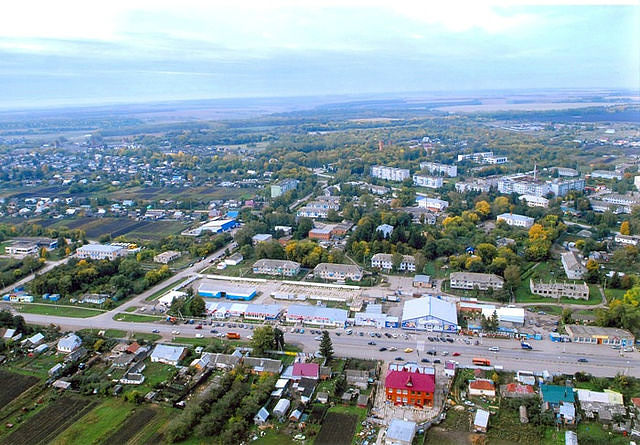
- View of Teploye, Tyoplo-Ogaryovsky District

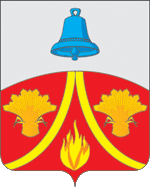
- Flag Coat of arms
- Location of Tyoplo-Ogaryovsky District in Tula Oblast
- Coordinates: 53°36′39″N 37°35′39″E
- Country: Russia
- Federal subject: Tula Oblast
- Established: 23 July 1924
- Administrative center: Tyoploye

Area
  - Total: 1,014 km^{2} (392 sq mi)

Population (2010 Census)
  - Total: 12,705
  - Density: 12.53/km^{2} (32.45/sq mi)
  - Urban: 40.3%
  - Rural: 59.7%

Administrative structure
  - Administrative divisions: 1 Urban-type settlements, 18 Rural okrugs
  - Inhabited localities: 1 urban-type settlements, 111 rural localities

Municipal structure
  - Municipally incorporated as: Tyoplo-Ogaryovsky Municipal District
  - Municipal divisions: 1 urban settlements, 2 rural settlements
- Time zone: UTC+3 (MSK)
- OKTMO ID: 70642000
- Website: https://teploe.tularegion.ru/

Tyoplo-Ogaryovsky District (Russian: Тёпло-Огарёвский райо́н) is an administrative district (raion), one of the twenty-three in Tula Oblast, Russia. As a municipal division, it is incorporated as Tyoplo-Ogaryovsky Municipal District. It is located in the south of the oblast. The area of the district is 1,014 square kilometers (392 sq mi). Its administrative center is the urban locality (a work settlement) of Tyoploye. Population: 12,705 (2010 Census); 14,111 (2002 census); 15,493 (1989 Soviet census). The population of Tyoploye accounts for 40.3% of the district's total population.
