= Yasnogorsk, Tula Oblast =

Town in Tula Oblast, Russia

Yasnogorsk Ясногоpск
- Town
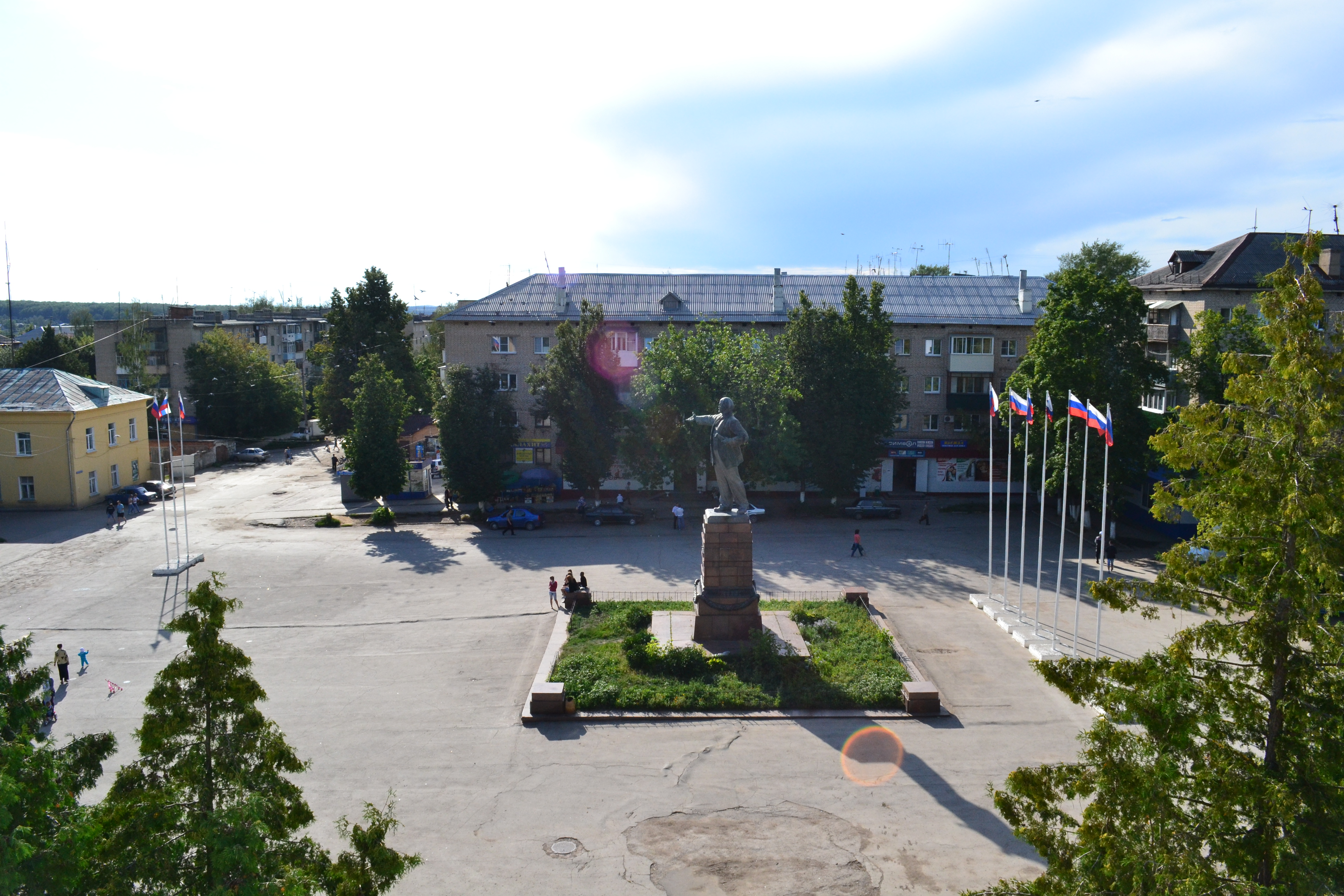
- Lenina Square in Yasnogorsk

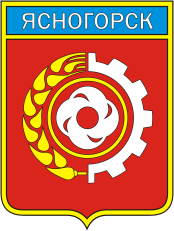
- Coat of arms
- Interactive map of Yasnogorsk
- Location of Yasnogorsk Yasnogorsk (Tula Oblast)
- Coordinates: 54°30′N 37°40′E
- Country: Russia
- Federal subject: Tula Oblast
- Administrative district: Yasnogorsky District
- Town under district jurisdictionSelsoviet: Yasnogorsk (Note: Law #954-ZTO defines a town under district jurisdiction as a town which is a part of one of the districts of the oblast. OKATO lists the town of Yasnogorsk as a part of Yasnogorsky District and separately from other administrative divisions of the district.)
- Known since: 1578-1579
- Town status since: 1958
- Elevation: 240 m (790 ft)

Population (2010 Census)
  - Total: 16,795
  - Estimate (2021): 15,269 (−9.1%)

Administrative status
  - Capital of: Yasnogorsky District, Yasnogorsk Town Under District Jurisdiction

Municipal status
  - Municipal district: Yasnogorsky Municipal District
  - Urban settlement: Yasnogorsk Urban Settlement
  - Capital of: Yasnogorsky Municipal District, Yasnogorsk Urban Settlement
- Time zone: UTC+3 (MSK)
- Postal code: 301030–301032
- Dialing code: +7 48766
- OKTMO ID: 70650101001

Yasnogorsk (Russian: Ясного́рск) is a town and the administrative center of Yasnogorsky District in Tula Oblast, Russia, located on the Vashana River (Oka's tributary), 35 kilometers (22 mi) north of Tula, the administrative center of the oblast. Population: 16,795 (2010 census); 18,588 (2002 census); 21,292 (1989 Soviet census).

== History ==
The village of Laptevo (Ла́птево) has been known since 1578–1579. It was granted urban-type settlement status in 1938 and town status in 1958. It was given its present name in 1965.

== Administrative and municipal status ==
Within the framework of administrative divisions, Yasnogorsk serves as the administrative center of Yasnogorsky District. As an administrative division, it is incorporated within Yasnogorsky District as Yasnogorsk Town Under District Jurisdiction. As a municipal division, Yasnogorsk Town Under District Jurisdiction is incorporated within Yasnogorsky Municipal District as Yasnogorsk Urban Settlement.

=== Local government ===
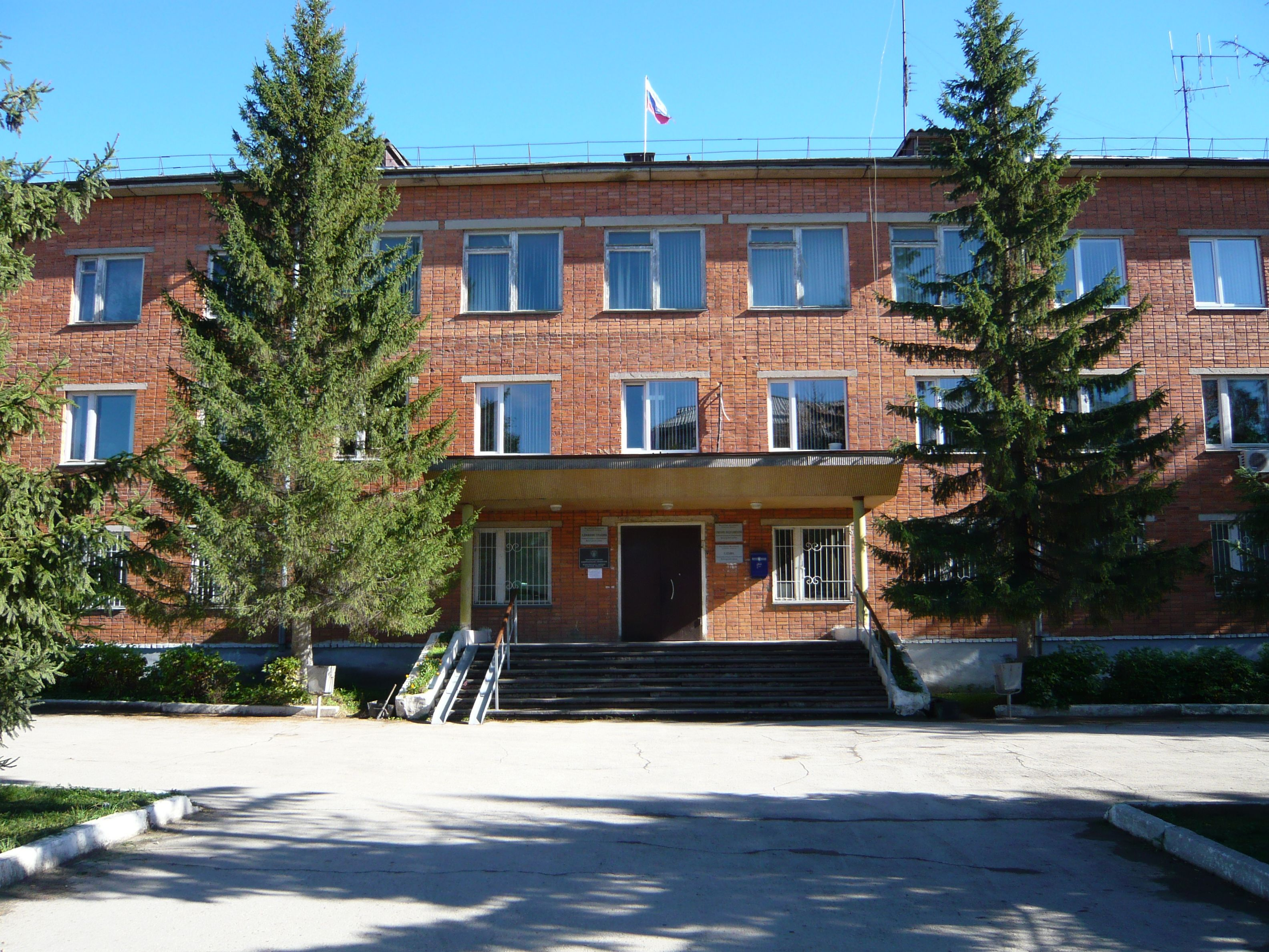
Administration building

Local self-government is based on the charter adopted at a local referendum on 23 March 1997.

The structure of local government bodies of the city of Yasnogorsk is:

- the representative body of the municipal formation is the Assembly of Deputies of the municipal formation "City of Yasnogorsk";
- the highest elected official of the municipal formation is the head of the municipal formation "City of Yasnogorsk";
- the executive and administrative body of the municipal formation is the administration of the municipal formation "City of Yasnogorsk";
- the control body of the municipal formation is the audit commission of the municipal formation "City of Yasnogorsk".

The representative body of local self-government, the Assembly of Deputies, has been operating since 2006. As a result of the elections on 1 March 2009, the second convocation of 15 deputies was elected (9 from United Russia, 1 from the Communist Party of the Russian Federation, 1 from A Just Russia, 4 self-nominated candidates). Following the results of the 2023 elections, a representative of the Yabloko party was elected to the council.

Since 3 April 2009, the Head of the municipal formation "City of Yasnogorsk" has been Alexander Mikhailovich Dorogov. The position of Head of Administration of the municipal formation "City of Yasnogorsk" is occupied by Kharalampy Vasilyevich Mavrapulo (since 30 April 2009).

== Economy ==
The Yasnogorsk Machine-Building Factory builds parts for wagons, pumps, and locomotives for Russia's mining industry. The factory opened in 1895; along with jobs, the factory provided social services; in 1991 the factory owners gradually cut back on these services. In 2009, fewer than 280 workers were employed, from a peak of 7,000.

The town lags behind other urban centers of the oblast both economically and socially and its population has been steadily declining.
