= Sokolniki, Tula Oblast =

Coordinates: 54°04′N 38°29′E

Sokolniki (Russian: Соко́льники) was a town in Novomoskovsky District of Tula Oblast, Russia, located 83 kilometers (52 mi) east of Tula. On October 24, 2008, it was merged with the town of Novomoskovsk, with its territory re-organized as a microdistrict. Population: 11,142 (2002 census); 12,219 (1989 Soviet census).

== History ==
The village of Sokolniki had existed in the region since at least the 19th century. The name originates from the last name Sokolnikov.

It was formed as a settlement in 1949, and was granted urban-type settlement status in 1954. Town status was granted to it in 1958.

Brown coal was mined in the town until the 1990s.
