= Kurkinsky District =

Kurkinsky District Куркинский район (Russian)
- District
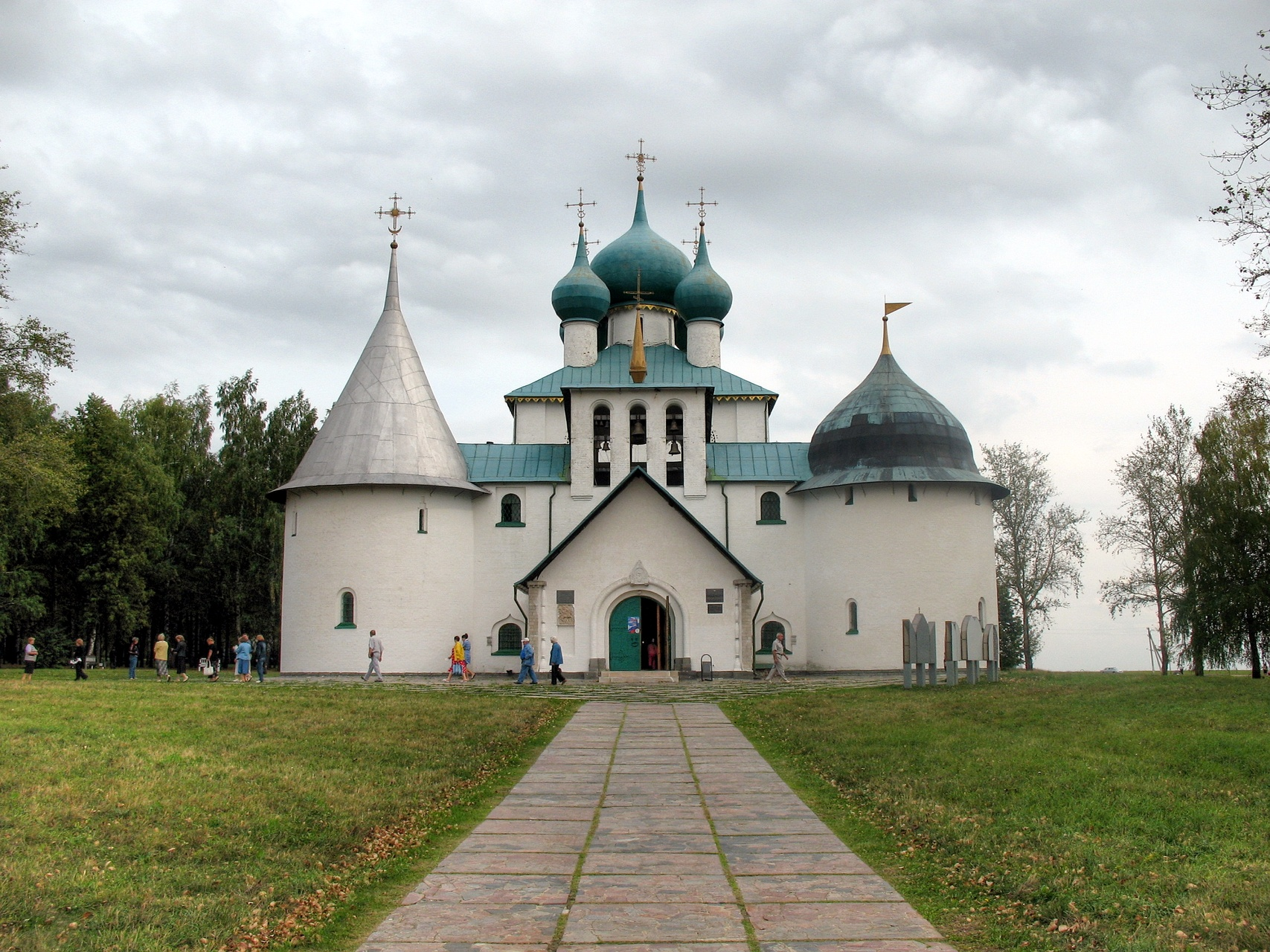
- Kulikovo Field Church of Saint Sergius of Radonezh, Kurkinsky District

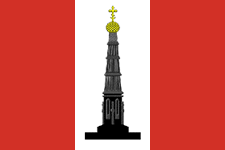
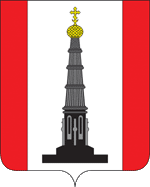
- Flag Coat of arms
- Location of Kurkinsky District in Tula Oblast
- Coordinates: 53°26′12″N 38°40′11″E
- Country: Russia
- Federal subject: Tula Oblast
- Established: 8 July 1924
- Administrative center: Kurkino

Area
  - Total: 949.25 km^{2} (366.51 sq mi)

Population (2010 Census)
  - Total: 10,830
  - Density: 11.41/km^{2} (29.55/sq mi)
  - Urban: 50.0%
  - Rural: 50.0%

Administrative structure
  - Administrative divisions: 1 Urban-type settlements, 8 Volosts
  - Inhabited localities: 1 urban-type settlements, 118 rural localities

Municipal structure
  - Municipally incorporated as: Kurkinsky Municipal District
  - Municipal divisions: 1 urban settlements, 3 rural settlements
- Time zone: UTC+3 (MSK)
- OKTMO ID: 70630000
- Website: http://kurkino.tulobl.ru/

Kurkinsky District (Russian: Ку́ркинский райо́н) is an administrative district (raion), one of the twenty-three in Tula Oblast, Russia. As a municipal division, it is incorporated as Kurkinsky Municipal District. It is located in the southeast of the oblast. The area of the district is 949.25 square kilometers (366.51 sq mi). Its administrative center is the urban locality (a work settlement) of Kurkino. Population: 10,830 (2010 Census); 13,077 (2002 census); 15,457 (1989 Soviet census). The population of Kurkino accounts for 50.0% of the district's total population.
