= Kurkino, Tula Oblast =

Kurkino Куркино
- Urban-type settlement
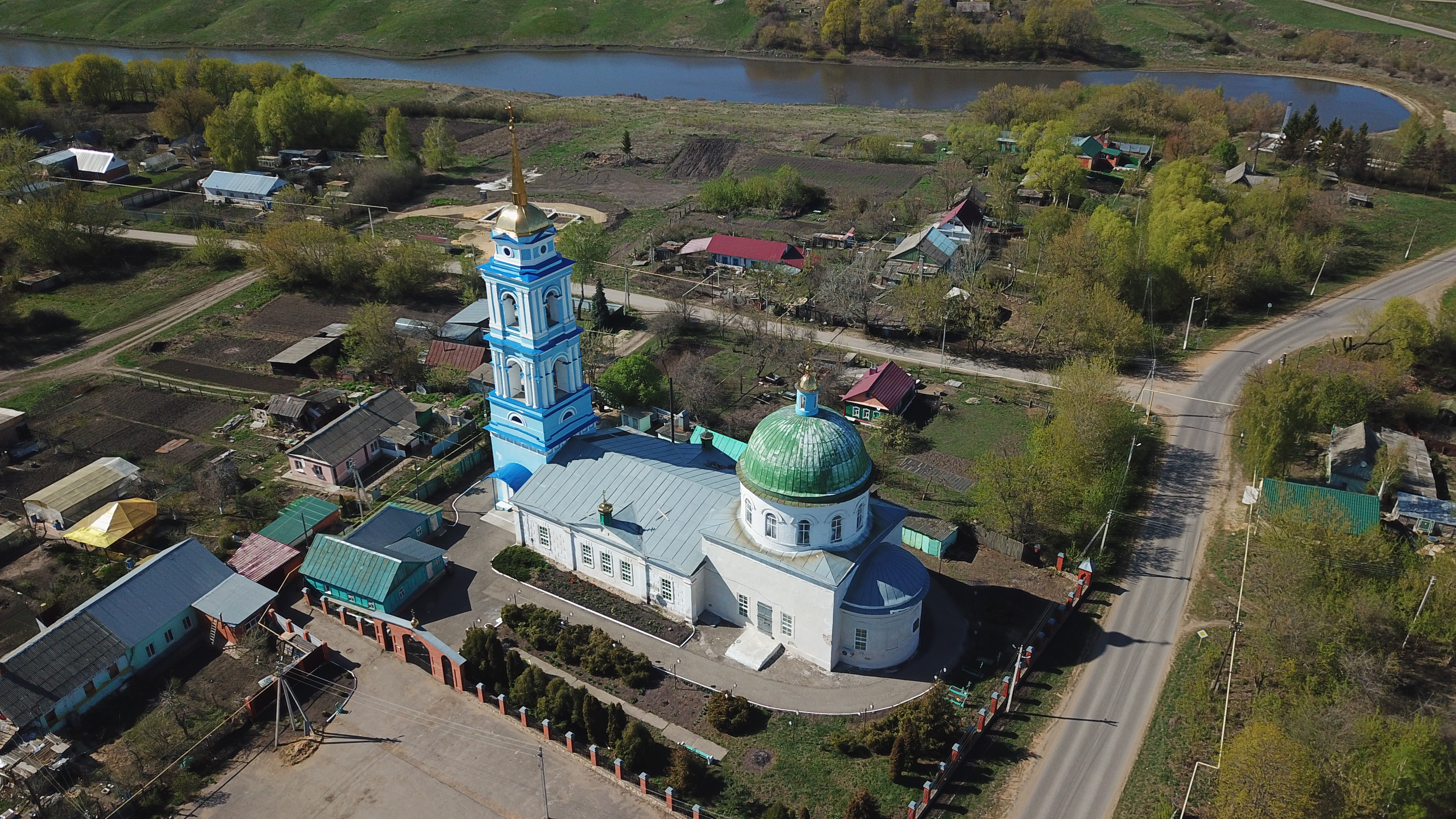
- Interactive map of Kurkino
- Location of Kurkino Kurkino (Tula Oblast)
- Coordinates: 53.4248°N 38.6571°E
- Country: Russia
- Federal subject: Tula Oblast
- Administrative district: Kurkinsky District

Population (2010 Census)
  - Total: 5,411
  - Estimate (2021): 5,457 (+0.9%)
- Time zone: UTC+3 (MSK)
- Postal code: 301940
- OKTMO ID: 70630151051

Kurkino (Russian: Ку́ркино) is an urban locality (an urban-type settlement) in Kurkinsky District of Tula Oblast, Russia. Population: 5,411 (2010 census); 6,117 (2002 census); 6,991 (1989 Soviet census).
