= Yasnogorsky District =

Yasnogorsky District Ясногорский район (Russian)
- District
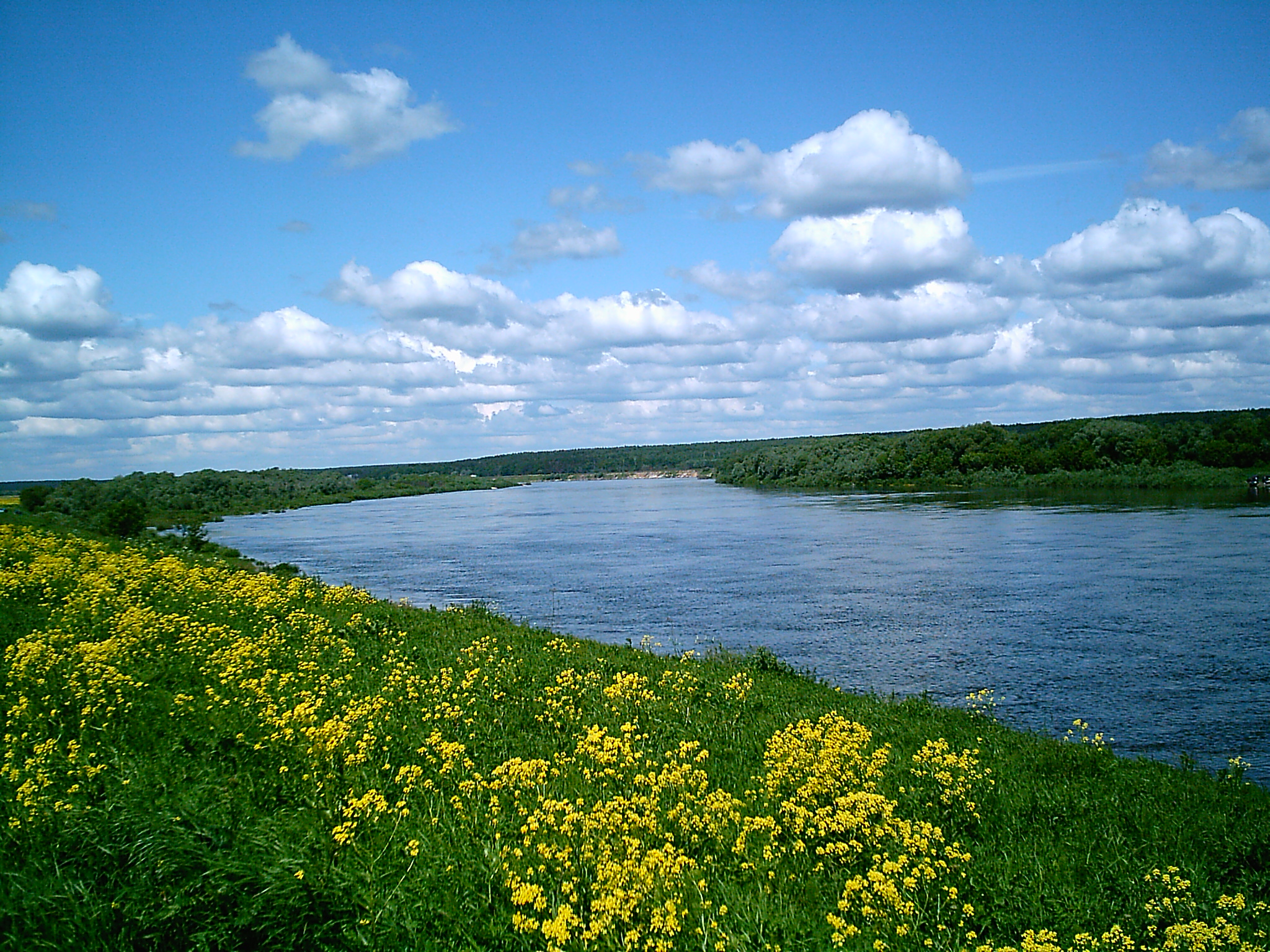
- View of the Oka, Yasnogorsky District

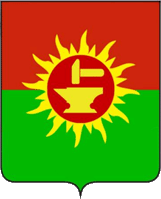
- Coat of arms
- Location of Yasnogorsky District in Tula Oblast
- Coordinates: 54°28′46″N 37°41′36″E
- Country: Russia
- Federal subject: Tula Oblast
- Established: 20 June 1924
- Administrative center: Yasnogorsk

Area
  - Total: 1,299.7 km^{2} (501.8 sq mi)

Population (2010 Census)
  - Total: 31,152
  - Density: 23.969/km^{2} (62.078/sq mi)
  - Urban: 63.4%
  - Rural: 36.6%

Administrative structure
  - Administrative divisions: 1 Towns under district jurisdiction, 1 Urban-type settlements, 19 Rural territories
  - Inhabited localities: 1 cities/towns, 1 urban-type settlements, 164 rural localities

Municipal structure
  - Municipally incorporated as: Yasnogorsky Municipal District
  - Municipal divisions: 2 urban settlements, 4 rural settlements
- Time zone: UTC+3 (MSK)
- OKTMO ID: 70650000
- Website: Discover

Yasnogorsky District (Russian: Ясного́рский райо́н) is an administrative district (raion), one of the twenty-three in Tula Oblast, Russia. Within the framework of municipal divisions, it is incorporated as Yasnogorsky Municipal District. It is located in the north of the oblast. The area of the district is 1,299.7 square kilometers (501.8 sq mi). Its administrative center is the town of Yasnogorsk. Population: 31,152 (2010 Census); 34,926 (2002 census); 39,606 (1989 Soviet census). The population of Yasnogorsk accounts for 53.9% of the district's total population.
