= Tyoploye, Tyoplo-Ogaryovsky District, Tula Oblast =

Tyoploye Тёплое
- Urban-type settlement
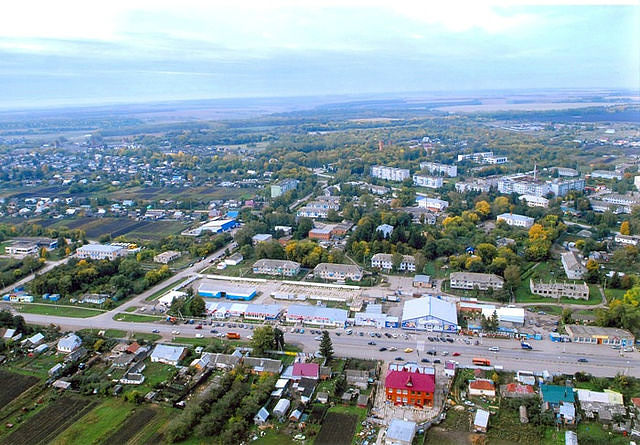
- View of the town
- Interactive map of Tyoploye
- Location of Tyoploye Tyoploye (Tula Oblast)
- Coordinates: 53.6228°N 37.5912°E
- Country: Russia
- Federal subject: Tula Oblast
- Administrative district: Tyoplo-Ogaryovsky District

Population (2010 Census)
  - Total: 5,115
  - Estimate (2021): 4,846 (−5.3%)
- Time zone: UTC+3 (MSK)
- Postal code: 301900
- OKTMO ID: 70642151051

Tyoploye (Russian: Тёплое) is an urban locality (an urban-type settlement) in Tyoplo-Ogaryovsky District of Tula Oblast, Russia. Population: 5,115 (2010 census); 5,457 (2002 census); 5,740 (1989 Soviet census).
