= Dubna, Dubensky District, Tula Oblast =

Dubna Дубна
- Urban-type settlement
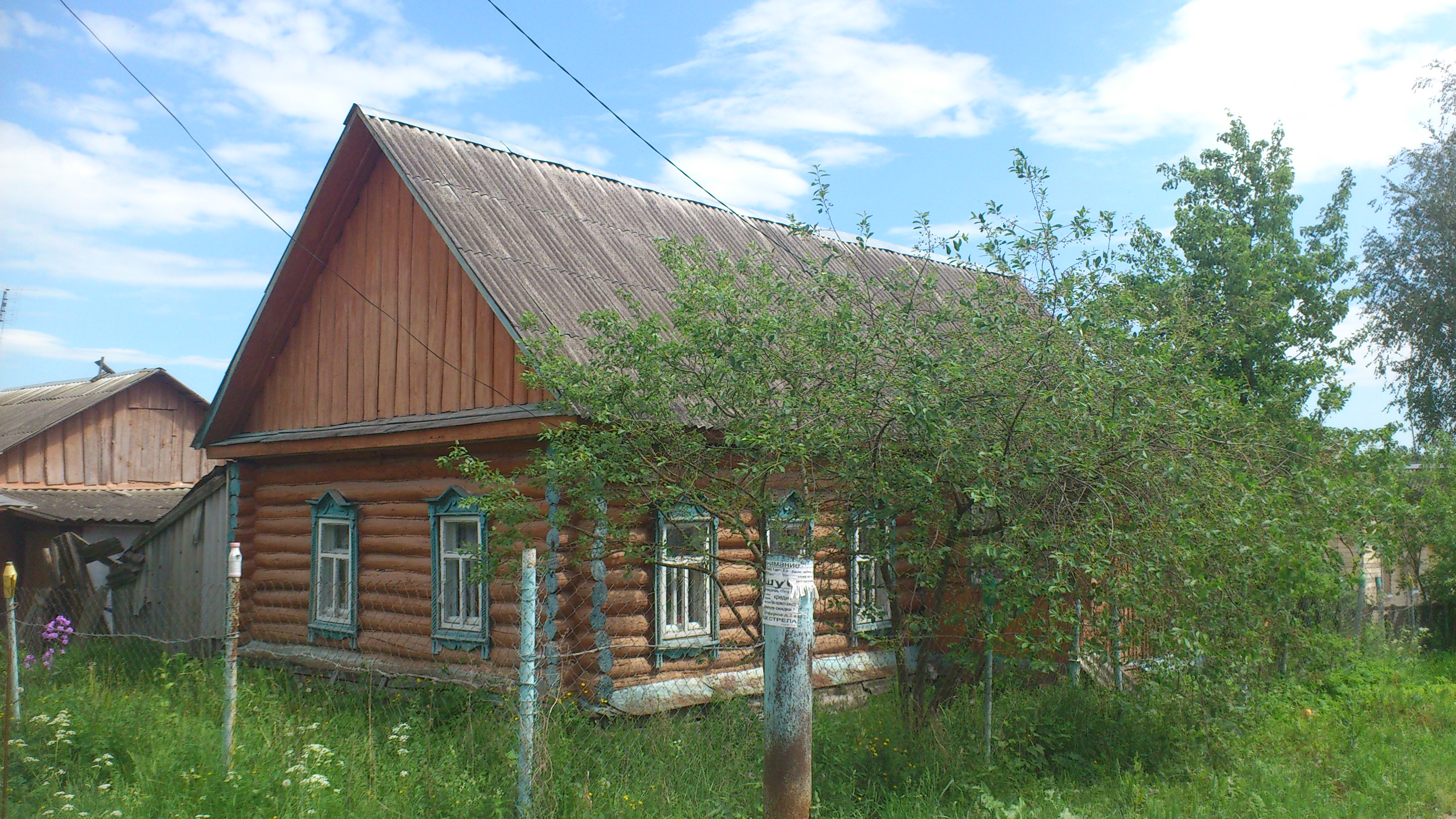
- Interactive map of Dubna
- Location of Dubna Dubna (Tula Oblast)
- Coordinates: 54.1534°N 36.9616°E
- Country: Russia
- Federal subject: Tula Oblast
- Administrative district: Dubensky District

Population (2010 Census)
  - Total: 5,980
  - Estimate (2021): 5,972 (−0.1%)
- Time zone: UTC+3 (MSK)
- Postal code: 301160
- OKTMO ID: 70618151051

Dubna (Russian: Дубна) is an urban locality (an urban-type settlement) in Dubensky District of Tula Oblast, Russia. Population: 5,980 (2010 census); 6,194 (2002 census); 6,199 (1989 Soviet census).
