= Shchekino =

Town in Tula Oblast, Russia

Shchekino Щёкино
- Town
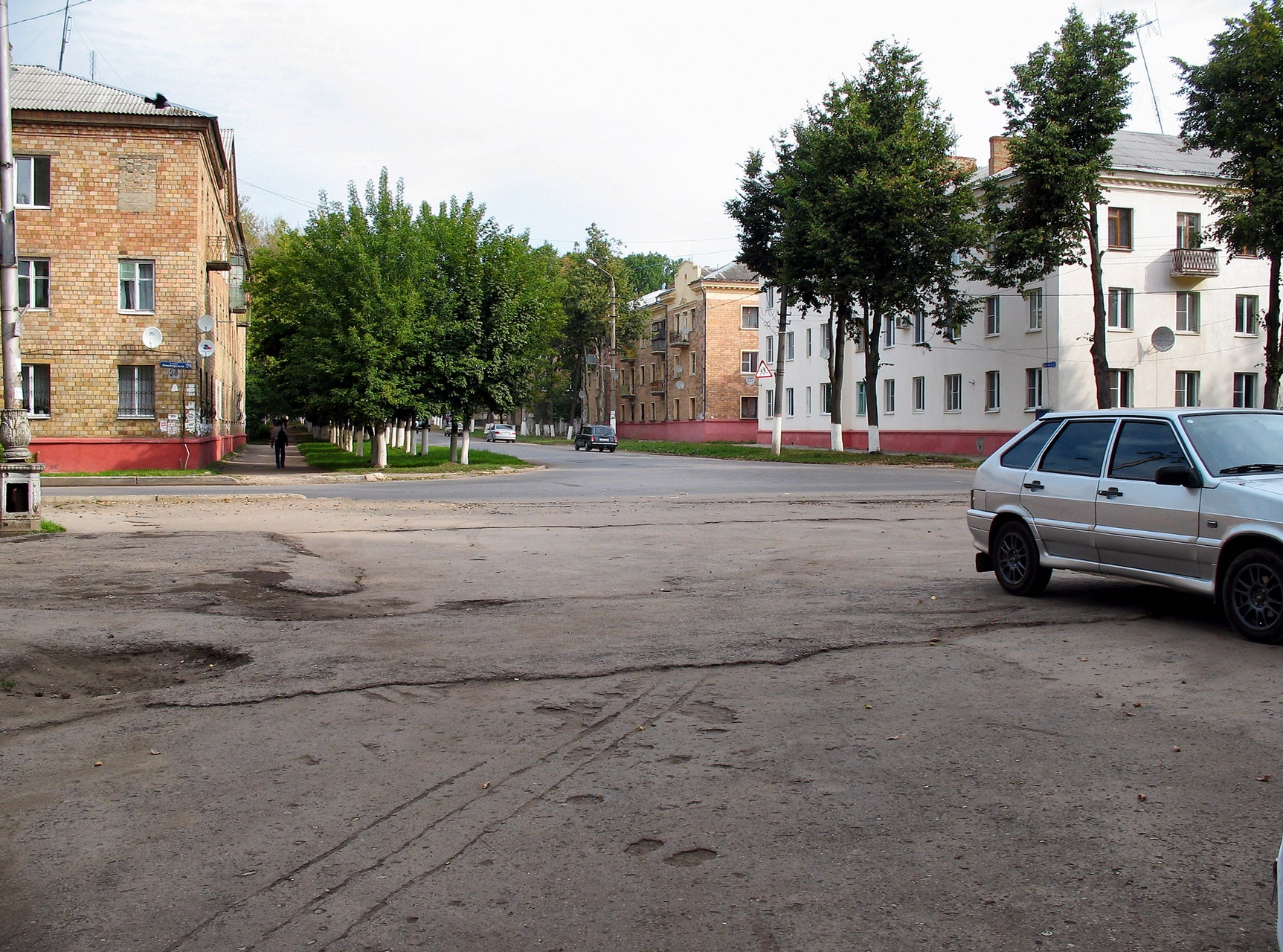
- In Shchekino

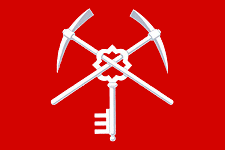
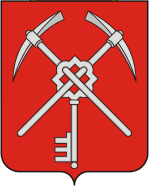
- Flag Coat of arms
- Interactive map of Shchekino
- Location of Shchekino Shchekino (Tula Oblast)
- Coordinates: 54°00′N 37°31′E
- Country: Russia
- Federal subject: Tula Oblast
- Administrative district: Shchyokinsky District
- Town under district jurisdictionSelsoviet: Shchekino
- Founded: 1871
- Town status since: 1938
- Elevation: 240 m (790 ft)

Population (2010 Census)
  - Total: 58,139
  - Estimate (2025): 52,177 (−10.3%)

Administrative status
  - Capital of: Shchyokinsky District, Shchekino Town Under District Jurisdiction

Municipal status
  - Municipal district: Shchyokinsky Municipal District
  - Urban settlement: Shchekino Urban Settlement
  - Capital of: Shchyokinsky Municipal District, Shchekino Urban Settlement
- Time zone: UTC+3 (MSK)
- Postal codes: 301240, 301241, 301243–301249, 301259
- OKTMO ID: 70648101001

Shchekino (Russian: Щёкино), also romanized Shchyokino, is a town and the administrative center of Shchyokinsky District in Tula Oblast, Russia, located on the Moscow—Simferopol highway (M2), 25 kilometers (16 mi) south of Tula, the administrative center of the oblast. Population: 58,139 (2010 census); 61,588 (2002 census); 69,251 (1989 Soviet census); 72,000 (1977).

== History ==
It was founded in 1871 in connection with the development of brown coal deposits and soon supplanted Krapivna as the main settlement in the district. It was granted town status in 1938.

== Administrative and municipal status ==
Within the framework of administrative divisions, Shchekino serves as the administrative center of Shchyokinsky District. As an administrative division, it is incorporated within Shchyokinsky District as Shchekino Town Under District Jurisdiction. As a municipal division, Shchekino Town Under District Jurisdiction is incorporated within Shchyokinsky Municipal District as Shchekino Urban Settlement.

== Notable people ==
- Daria Abramova (born 1990) amateur boxer (2019 European Games featherweight women's bronze medalist)
