= Shchyokinsky District =

Shchyokinsky District Щёкинский район (Russian)
- District
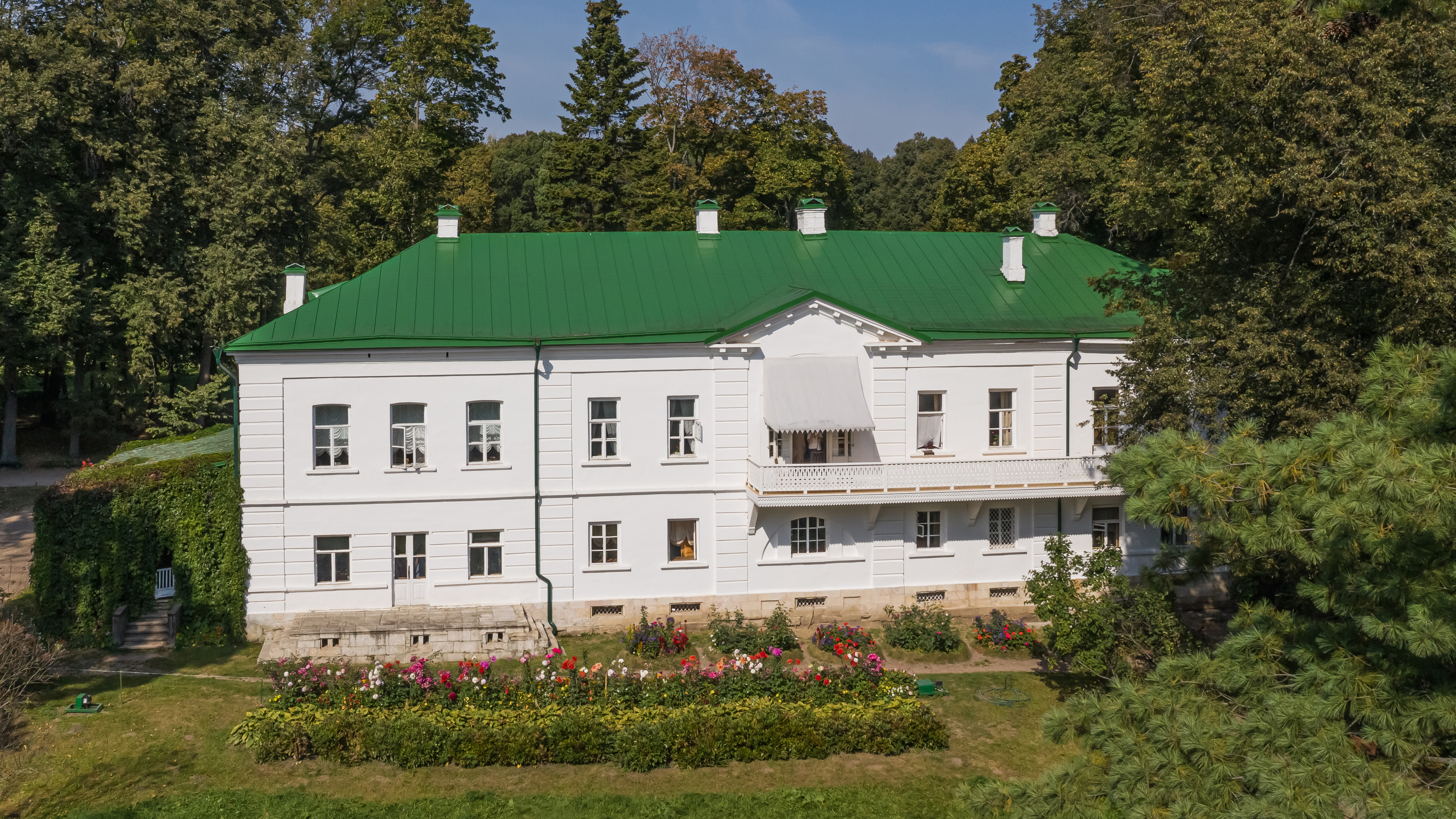
- Yasnaya Polyana, Home of Leo Tolstoy, Shchyokinsky District

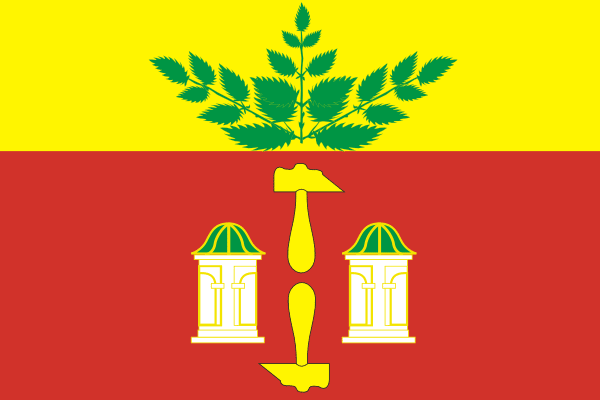
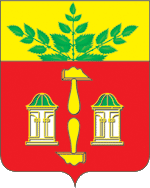
- Flag Coat of arms
- Location of Shchyokinsky District in Tula Oblast
- Coordinates: 54°00′32″N 37°30′01″E
- Country: Russia
- Federal subject: Tula Oblast
- Established: 1 July 1924
- Administrative center: Shchyokino

Area
  - Total: 1,393.4 km^{2} (538.0 sq mi)

Population (2010 Census)
  - Total: 106,595
  - Density: 76.500/km^{2} (198.13/sq mi)
  - Urban: 73.6%
  - Rural: 26.4%

Administrative structure
  - Administrative divisions: 2 Towns under district jurisdiction, 2 Urban-type settlements, 21 Rural administrations
  - Inhabited localities: 2 cities/towns, 2 urban-type settlements, 247 rural localities

Municipal structure
  - Municipally incorporated as: Shchyokinsky Municipal District
  - Municipal divisions: 4 urban settlements, 5 rural settlements
- Time zone: UTC+3 (MSK)
- OKTMO ID: 70648000
- Website: http://www.schekino.ru/

Shchyokinsky District (Russian: Щёкинский райо́н, Ščjokinskij rajón) is an administrative district (raion), one of the twenty-three in Tula Oblast, Russia. Within the framework of municipal divisions, it is incorporated as Shchyokinsky Municipal District. It is located in the center of the oblast. The area of the district is 1,393.4 square kilometers (538.0 sq mi). Its administrative center is the town of Shchyokino. Population: 106,595 (2010 Census); 43,064 (2002 census); 48,434 (1989 Soviet census). The population of the administrative center accounts for 54.5% of the district's total population.
