= Kireyevsky (rural locality) =

Kireyevsky Киреевский
- Khutor
- Location within Volgograd Oblast Location within Russia
- Coordinates: 49°45′N 42°56′E
- Country: Russia
- Region: Volgograd Oblast
- District: Serafimovichsky District
- Time zone: UTC+4:00

Kireyevsky (Russian: Киреевский) is a rural locality (a khutor) in Tryasinovskoye Rural Settlement, Serafimovichsky District, Volgograd Oblast, Russia. The population was 6 as of 2010. There are 2 streets.

== Geography ==
Kireyevsky is located 30 km northeast of Serafimovich (the district's administrative centre) by road. Tryasinovsky is the nearest rural locality.
