= Volovsky District, Tula Oblast =

Volovsky District Воловский район (Russian)
- District
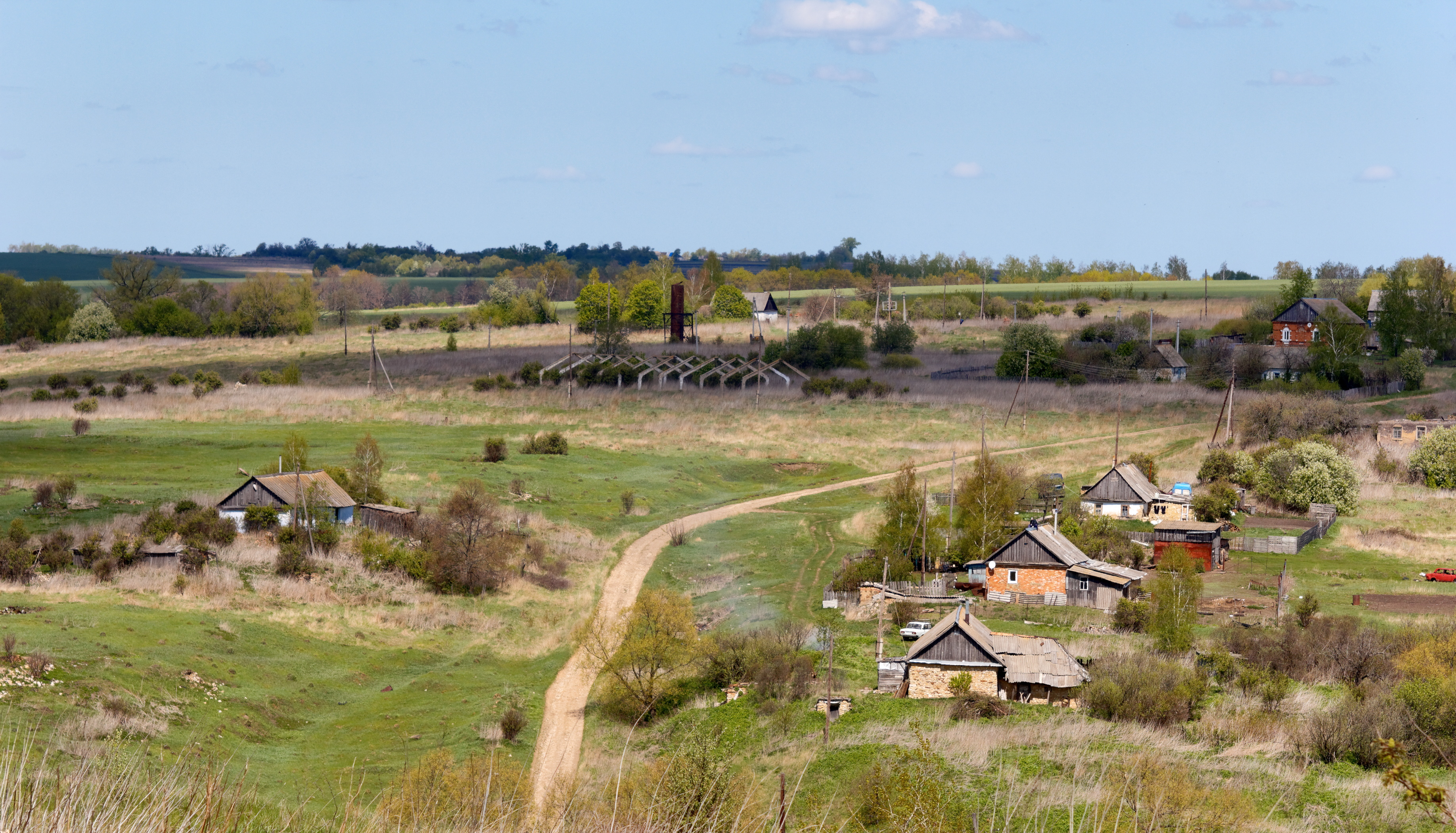
- Village Nikitskoye, Volovsky District

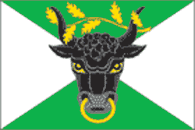
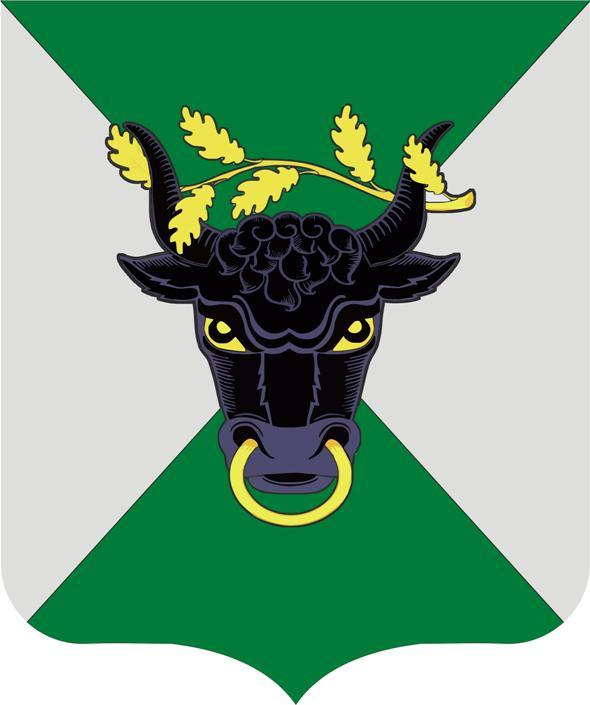
- Flag Coat of arms
- Location of Volovsky District in Tula Oblast
- Coordinates: 53°33′20″N 38°01′20″E
- Country: Russia
- Federal subject: Tula Oblast
- Established: 13 May 1924
- Administrative center: Volovo

Area
  - Total: 1,080 km^{2} (420 sq mi)

Population (2010 Census)
  - Total: 13,596
  - Density: 12.6/km^{2} (32.6/sq mi)
  - Urban: 28.3%
  - Rural: 71.7%

Administrative structure
  - Administrative divisions: 1 Urban-type settlements, 12 Rural okrugs
  - Inhabited localities: 1 urban-type settlements, 118 rural localities

Municipal structure
  - Municipally incorporated as: Volovsky Municipal District
  - Municipal divisions: 1 urban settlements, 2 rural settlements
- Time zone: UTC+3 (MSK)
- OKTMO ID: 70616000
- Website: http://volovo.tularegion.ru/

Volovsky District (Russian: Воло́вский райо́н) is an administrative district (raion), one of the twenty-three in Tula Oblast, Russia. As a municipal division, it is incorporated as Volovsky Municipal District. It is located in the southeast of the oblast. The area of the district is 1,080 square kilometers (420 sq mi). Its administrative center is the urban locality (a work settlement) of Volovo. Population: 13,596 (2010 Census); 15,957 (2002 census); 18,419 (1989 Soviet census). The population of Volovo accounts for 28.3% of the district's total population.
