= Volovo, Volovsky District, Tula Oblast =

Volovo Волово
- Urban-type settlement
- Interactive map of Volovo
- Location of Volovo Volovo (Tula Oblast)
- Coordinates: 53.5535°N 38.0084°E
- Country: Russia
- Federal subject: Tula Oblast
- Administrative district: Volovsky District

Population (2010 Census)
  - Total: 3,853
  - Estimate (2021): 3,570 (−7.3%)
- Time zone: UTC+3 (MSK)
- Postal code: 301570
- OKTMO ID: 70616151051

Volovo (Russian: Воло́во) is an urban locality (an urban-type settlement) in Volovsky District of Tula Oblast, Russia. Population: 3,853 (2010 census); 4,208 (2002 census); 4,331 (1989 Soviet census).
