= Donskoy, Tula Oblast =

Town in Tula Oblast, Russia

Donskoy Донской
- Town
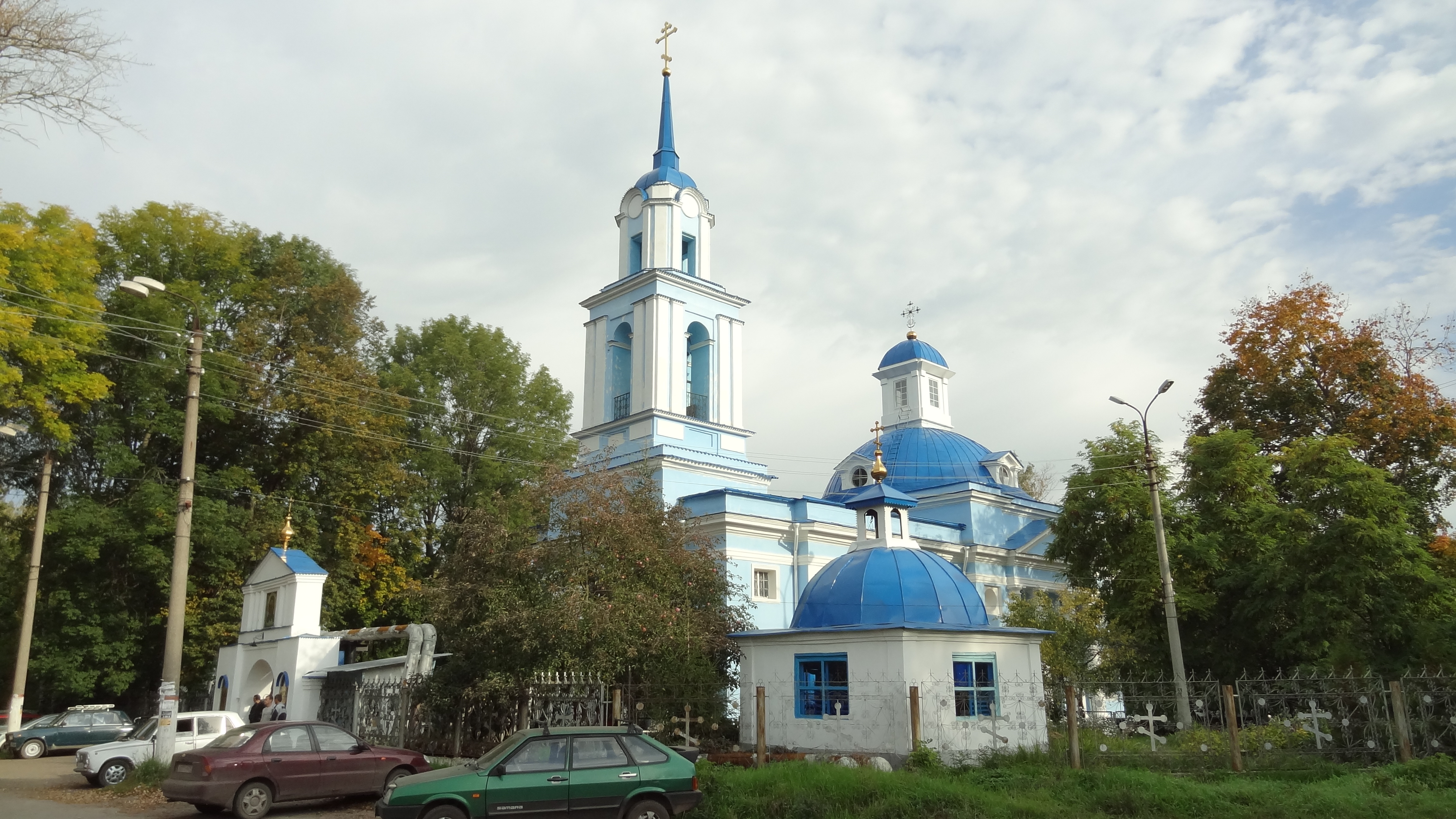

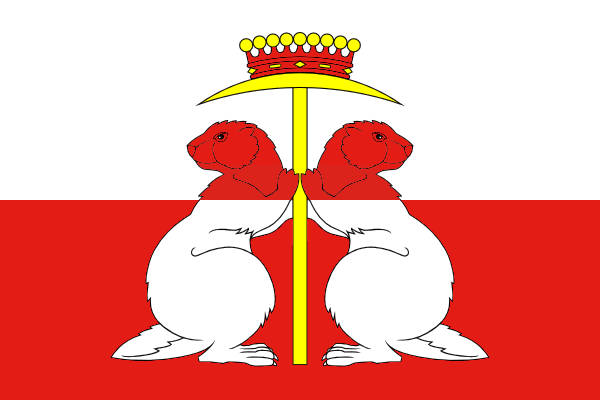
- Flag Coat of arms
- Interactive map of Donskoy
- Location of Donskoy Donskoy (Tula Oblast)
- Coordinates: 53°57′57″N 38°19′29″E
- Country: Russia
- Federal subject: Tula Oblast
- Founded: 1773
- Town status since: 1939
- Elevation: 210 m (690 ft)

Population (2010 Census)
  - Total: 64,552
  - Estimate (2025): 61,740 (−4.4%)
  - Rank: 244th in 2010

Administrative status
  - Subordinated to: Donskoy Town Under Oblast Jurisdiction
  - Capital of: Donskoy Town Under Oblast Jurisdiction

Municipal status
  - Urban okrug: Donskoy Urban Okrug
  - Capital of: Donskoy Urban Okrug
- Time zone: UTC+3 (MSK)
- Postal code: 301760
- OKTMO ID: 70712000001
- Website: donskoy.tularegion.ru

Donskoy (Russian: Донско́й) is a town in Tula Oblast, Russia, located in the upper streams of the Don River, 65 kilometers (40 mi) southeast of Tula. Population: 61,477 (2021 census); 64,552 (2010 census); 32,745 (2002 census); 36,158 (1989 Soviet census).

== History ==
Donskoy was granted town status in 1939.

== Administrative and municipal status ==
Within the framework of administrative divisions, it is, together with two rural localities, incorporated as Donskoy Town Under Oblast Jurisdiction—an administrative unit with the status equal to that of the districts. As a municipal division, Donskoy Town Under Oblast Jurisdiction is incorporated as Donskoy Urban Okrug.

== Notable people ==
- Yuliya Snigir
- Irina Saltykova
