= Kireyevsk =

Town in Tula Oblast, Russia

Kireyevsk Киреевск
- Town
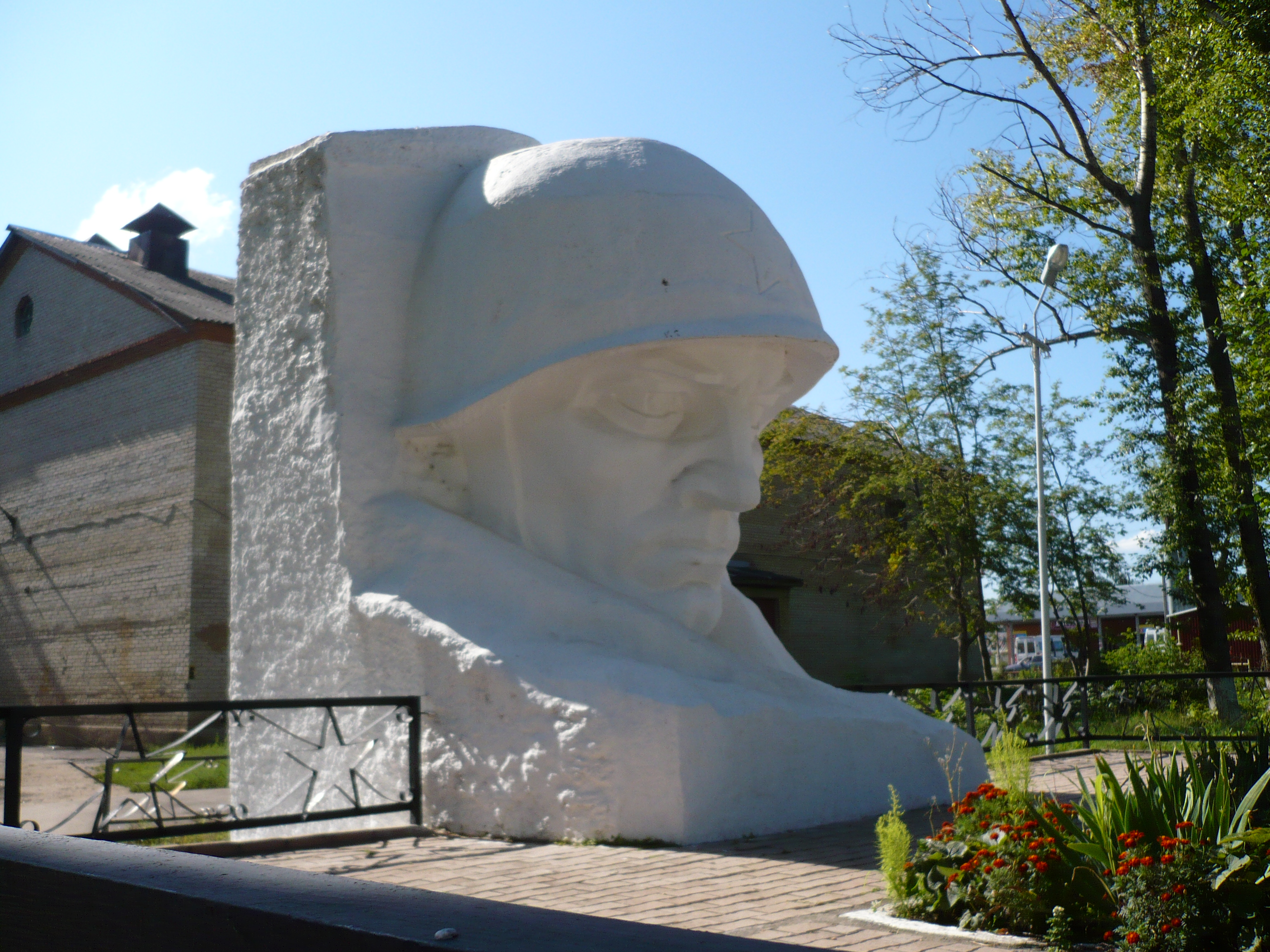

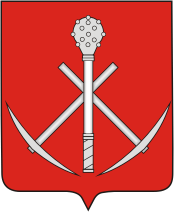
- Coat of arms
- Interactive map of Kireyevsk
- Location of Kireyevsk Kireyevsk (Tula Oblast)
- Coordinates: 53°56′N 37°56′E
- Country: Russia
- Federal subject: Tula Oblast
- Administrative district: Kireyevsky District
- Town under district jurisdictionSelsoviet: Kireyevsk
- Known since: second half of the 18th century
- Town status since: 1956
- Elevation: 210 m (690 ft)

Population (2010 Census)
  - Total: 25,557
  - Estimate (2021): 25,560 (+0%)

Administrative status
  - Capital of: Kireyevsky District, Kireyevsk Town Under District Jurisdiction

Municipal status
  - Municipal district: Kireyevsky Municipal District
  - Urban settlement: Kireyevsk Urban Settlement
  - Capital of: Kireyevsky Municipal District, Kireyevsk Urban Settlement
- Time zone: UTC+3 (MSK)
- Postal code: 301260–301262
- OKTMO ID: 70628101001

Kireyevsk (Russian: Кире́евск) is a town and the administrative center of Kireyevsky District in Tula Oblast, Russia, located on the Olen River, 40 kilometers (25 mi) southeast of Tula, the administrative center of the oblast. Population: 25,557 (2010 census); 26,284 (2002 census); 30,503 (1989 Soviet census).

== History ==
It has been known since the second half of the 18th century as the Cossack village of Kireyevskaya (Кире́евская). Iron ore deposits started to be developed in the 19th century. During the Soviet times, the village was granted urban-type settlement status and renamed Kireyevka (Кире́евка). It was granted town status and renamed Kireyevsk in 1956.

== Administrative and municipal status ==
Within the framework of administrative divisions, Kireyevsk serves as the administrative center of Kireyevsky District. As an administrative division, it is incorporated within Kireyevsky District as Kireyevsk Town Under District Jurisdiction. As a municipal division, Kireyevsk Town Under District Jurisdiction, together with Oktyabrsky Rural Okrug of Kireyevsky District (which comprises three rural localities), is incorporated within Kireyevsky Municipal District as Kireyevsk Urban Settlement.
