= Kimovsk =

Town in Tula Oblast, Russia

Kimovsk Кимовск
- Town
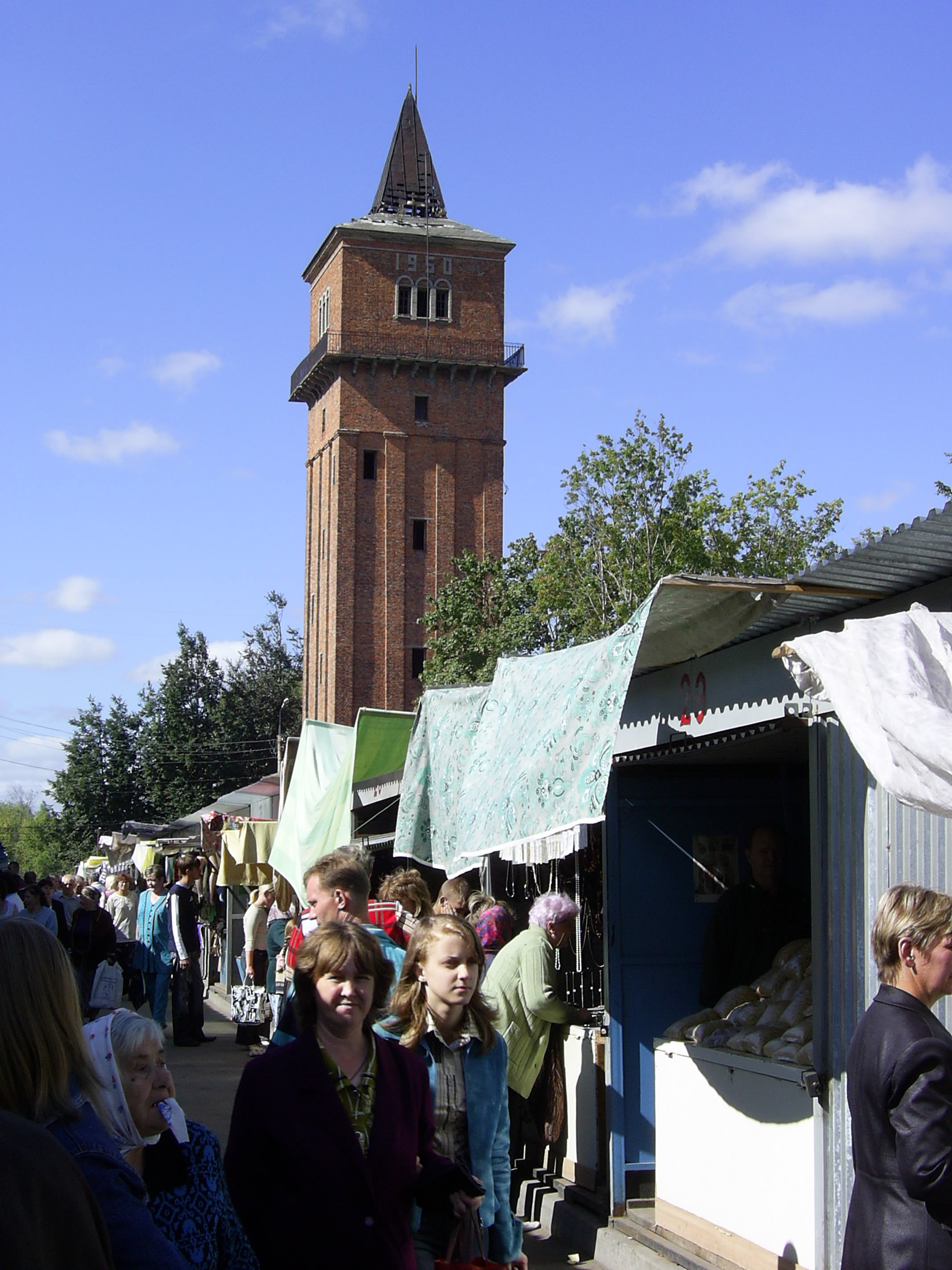
- Market in Kimovsk, 2005

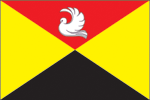
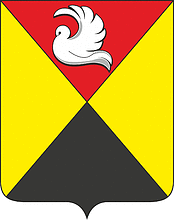
- Flag Coat of arms
- Interactive map of Kimovsk
- Location of Kimovsk Kimovsk (Tula Oblast)
- Coordinates: 53°58′N 38°32′E
- Country: Russia
- Federal subject: Tula Oblast
- Administrative district: Kimovsky District
- Town under district jurisdictionSelsoviet: Kimovsk
- Known since: 17th century
- Town status since: 1952
- Elevation: 210 m (690 ft)

Population (2010 Census)
  - Total: 28,485
  - Estimate (2021): 26,475 (−7.1%)

Administrative status
  - Capital of: Kimovsky District, Kimovsk Town Under District Jurisdiction

Municipal status
  - Municipal district: Kimovsky Municipal District
  - Urban settlement: Kimovsk Urban Settlement
  - Capital of: Kimovsky Municipal District, Kimovsk Urban Settlement
- Time zone: UTC+3 (MSK)
- Postal code: 301720–301723
- Dialing code: +7 48735
- OKTMO ID: 70626101001

Kimovsk (Russian: Ки́мовск) is a town and the administrative center of Kimovsky District in Tula Oblast, Russia, located at the watershed of the Don and Volga Rivers, 77 kilometers (48 mi) southeast of Tula, the administrative center of the oblast. Population: 28,485 (2010 census); 33,169 (2002 census); 38,294 (1989 Soviet census).

== History ==
The village of Mikhaylovka (Михайловка) has been known since the 17th century. It developed during the Great Patriotic War of 1941 to 1945 in connection with intensive coal exploitation at the Moscow Coal Basin. The Soviets built numerous mines on the lands of a kolkhoz called Young Communist International (Russian: Коммунистический интернационал молодёжи, abbreviated as Russian: КИМ, or KIM) and a habitat for miners. It was granted work-settlement status and given its present name in 1948; town status was granted to it in 1952.

== Administrative and municipal status ==
Within the framework of administrative divisions, Kimovsk serves as the administrative center of Kimovsky District. As an administrative division, it is incorporated within Kimovsky District as Kimovsk Town Under District Jurisdiction. As a municipal division, Kimovsk Town Under District Jurisdiction is incorporated within Kimovsky Municipal District as Kimovsk Urban Settlement.

== Transportation ==
Bus station and railway station share a building. Bus routes originating from Kimovsk include Moscow, Tula, Ryazan, Novomoskovsk, Uzlovaya, and other destinations.

== Culture ==
There is a museum of local lore in Kimovsk. The Memorial of the Great Patriotic War is located on the outskirts of Karachevsky forest.
