= Kireyevsky District =

Kireyevsky District Киреевский район (Russian)
- District
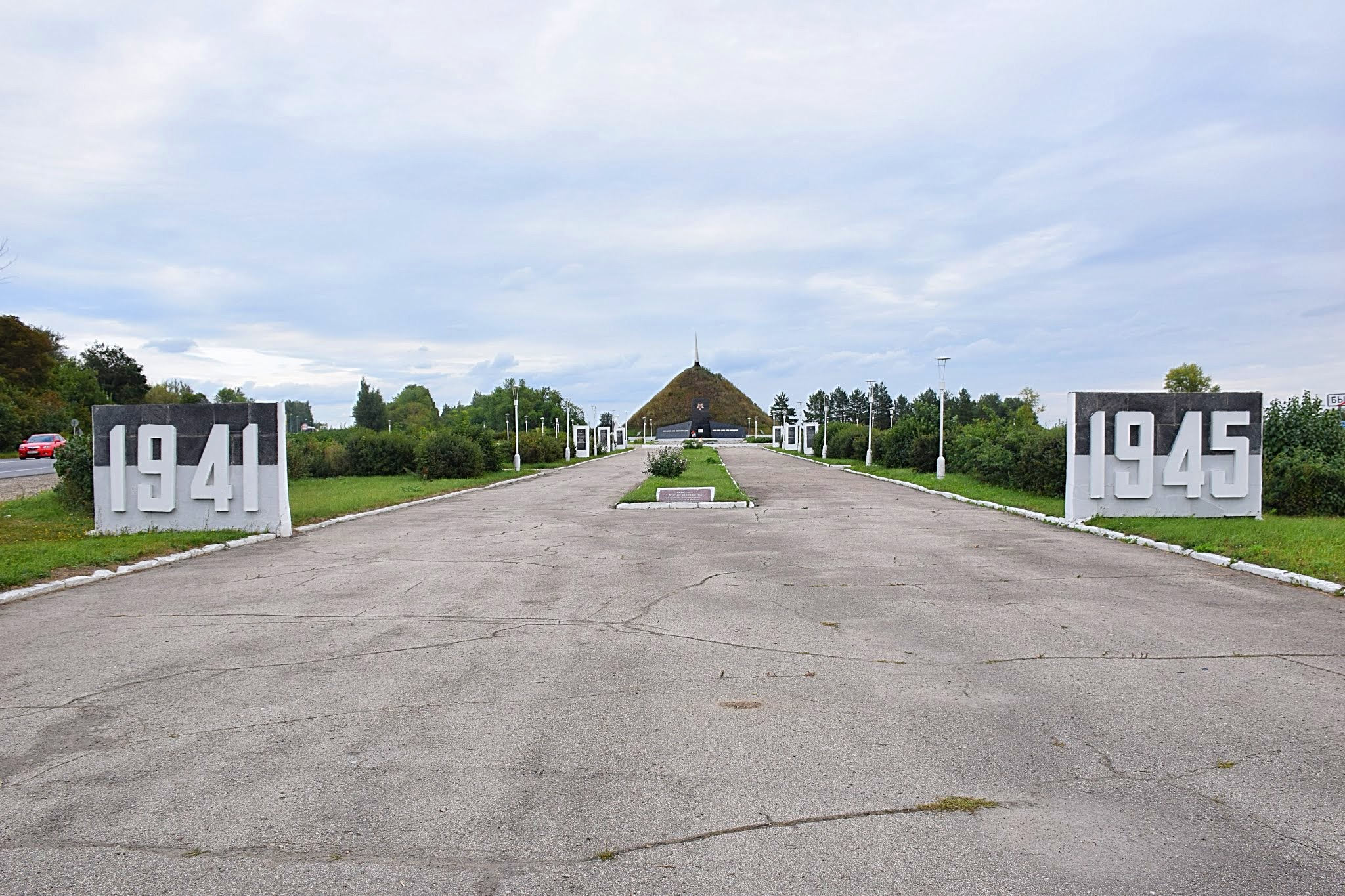
- Barrow of Immortality, Kireyevsky District

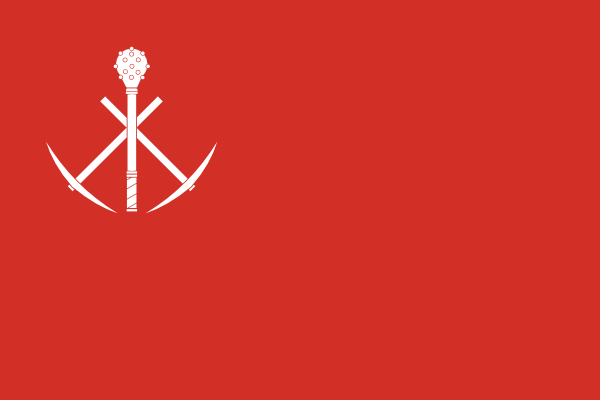
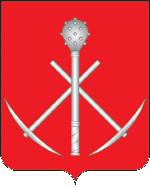
- Flag Coat of arms
- Location of Kireyevsky District in Tula Oblast
- Coordinates: 53°56′08″N 37°55′21″E
- Country: Russia
- Federal subject: Tula Oblast
- Established: 12 January 1965
- Administrative center: Kireyevsk

Area
  - Total: 931 km^{2} (359 sq mi)

Population (2010 Census)
  - Total: 75,142
  - Density: 80.7/km^{2} (209/sq mi)
  - Urban: 73.1%
  - Rural: 26.9%

Administrative structure
  - Administrative divisions: 3 Towns under district jurisdiction, 2 Urban-type settlements, 12 Rural okrugs
  - Inhabited localities: 3 cities/towns, 2 urban-type settlements, 176 rural localities

Municipal structure
  - Municipally incorporated as: Kireyevsky Municipal District
  - Municipal divisions: 5 urban settlements, 6 rural settlements
- Time zone: UTC+3 (MSK)
- OKTMO ID: 70628000
- Website: https://kireevsk.tularegion.ru/

Kireyevsky District (Russian: Киреевский район) is an administrative district (raion), one of the twenty-three in Tula Oblast, Russia. Within the framework of municipal divisions, it is incorporated as Kireyevsky Municipal District. It is located in the center of the oblast. The area of the district is 931 square kilometers (359 sq mi). Its administrative center is the town of Kireyevsk. Population: 75,142 (2010 Census); 79,142 (2002 census); 93,073 (1989 Soviet census). The population of Kireyevsk accounts for 34.0% of the district's total population.
