= Novomoskovsky District =

Novomoskovsky District Новомосковский район (Russian)
- District
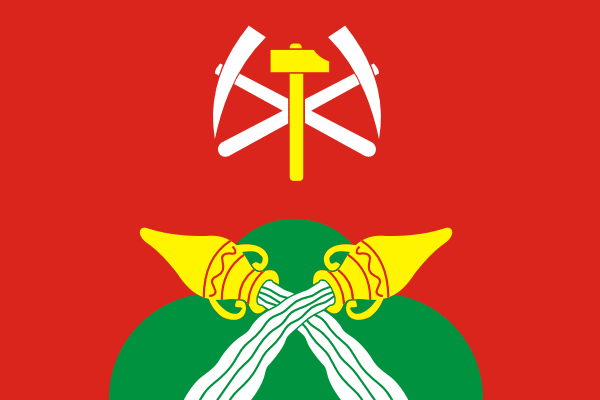
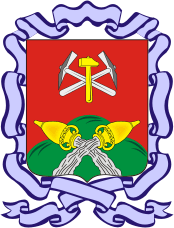
- Flag Coat of arms
- Location of Novomoskovsky District in Tula Oblast
- Coordinates: 54°01′39″N 38°17′48″E
- Country: Russia
- Federal subject: Tula Oblast
- Established: 1 August 1958
- Administrative center: Novomoskovsk

Area
  - Total: 906 km^{2} (350 sq mi)

Population (2010 Census)
  - Total: 143,848
  - Density: 159/km^{2} (411/sq mi)
  - Urban: 91.3%
  - Rural: 8.7%

Administrative structure
  - Administrative divisions: 1 Towns under district jurisdiction, 13 Rural okrugs
  - Inhabited localities: 1 cities/towns, 97 rural localities

Municipal structure
  - Municipally incorporated as: Novomoskovsk Urban Okrug
- Time zone: UTC+3 (MSK)
- OKTMO ID: 70724000
- Website: http://www.nmosk.ru/

Novomoskovsky District (Russian: Новомоско́вский райо́н) is an administrative district (raion), one of the twenty-three in Tula Oblast, Russia. Within the framework of municipal divisions, it is incorporated as Novomoskovsk Urban Okrug. It is located in the east of the oblast. The area of the district is 906 square kilometers (350 sq mi). Its administrative center is the city of Novomoskovsk. Population: 143,848 (2010 Census); 25,211 (2002 census); 26,289 (1989 Soviet census). The population of Novomoskovsk accounts for 91.3% of the district's total population.
