= Tula Oblast =

First-level administrative division of Russia

Tula Oblast Тульская область (Russian)
- Oblast
- Flag Coat of arms

- Coordinates: 53°55′N 37°35′E
- Country: Russia
- Federal district: Central
- Economic region: Central
- Established: 26 September 1937
- Administrative center: Tula

Government
  - Body: Oblast Duma
  - Governor: Dmitry Milyaev

Area
  - Total: 25,679 km^{2} (9,915 sq mi)
  - Rank: 69th

Population (2021 census)
  - Total: 1,501,214
  - Estimate (2018): 1,491,855
  - Rank: 31st
  - Density: 58.461/km^{2} (151.41/sq mi)
  - Urban: 73.3%
  - Rural: 26.7%

GDP (nominal, 2024)
  - Total: ₽1.31 trillion (US$15.31 billion)
  - Per capita: ₽891,344 (US$10,459.21)
- Time zone: UTC+3 (MSK)
- ISO 3166 code: RU-TUL
- License plates: 71
- OKTMO ID: 70000000
- Official languages: Russian
- Website: https://www.tula.ru

Tula Oblast (Russian: Ту́льская о́бласть, romanized: Tulʹskaya oblastʹ) is a federal subject (an oblast) of Russia. It is geographically located in European Russia and is administratively part of the Central Federal District, covering an area of 25,700 square kilometers (9,900 sq mi). It has a population of 1,553,925 (2010 census). Tula is the largest city and the administrative center of the oblast.

Tula Oblast borders Moscow Oblast in the north, Ryazan in the east, Lipetsk in the southeast, Oryol in the southwest, and Kaluga in the west. Tula Oblast is one of the most developed and urbanized territories in Russia, and the majority of the territory forms the Tula-Novomoskovsk Agglomeration, an urban area with a population of over 1 million.

== History ==
The Tula Oblast area has been inhabited since the Stone Age, as shown by the discoveries of burial mounds (kurgans) and old settlements. By the eighth century, these lands were occupied by the Vyatichi, an East Slavic tribe who cultivated the land, traded, and worked at crafts, confirmed by records in property registers which mention an "ancient settlement" located at the confluence of the Upa River and Tulitsa River. The first mention of the city of Tula in 1146 is found in the Nikon Chronicle, in reference to the campaign of Prince Svyatoslav Olgovich of Chernigov. At the time the lands belonged to the Ryazan Principality, and Prince Sviatoslav passed through a number of settlements, including Tula, while heading for Ryazan.

== Geography ==
Tula Oblast is located in Russia's Central Federal District and borders Moscow, Ryazan, Lipetsk, Oryol, and Kaluga Oblasts.

=== Rivers ===
Tula Oblast contains more than 1,600 rivers and streams. Major rivers include:

- Don River
- Oka River
- Upa River

=== Natural resources ===
The oblast is rich in iron ore, clay, limestone, and deposits of lignite (coal). The lignite deposit is part of the Moscow coal basin.

=== Climate ===
Tula Oblast has a moderate continental climate, with warm summers and cold winters. Average January temperature is −10 °C (14 °F) in the north and −9 °C (16 °F) in the south. Average July temperature is about +19 °C (66 °F) to +20 °C (68 °F). Annual precipitation is 470 millimetres (19 in) in the southeast and 575 millimetres (22.6 in) in the northwest.

== Politics ==
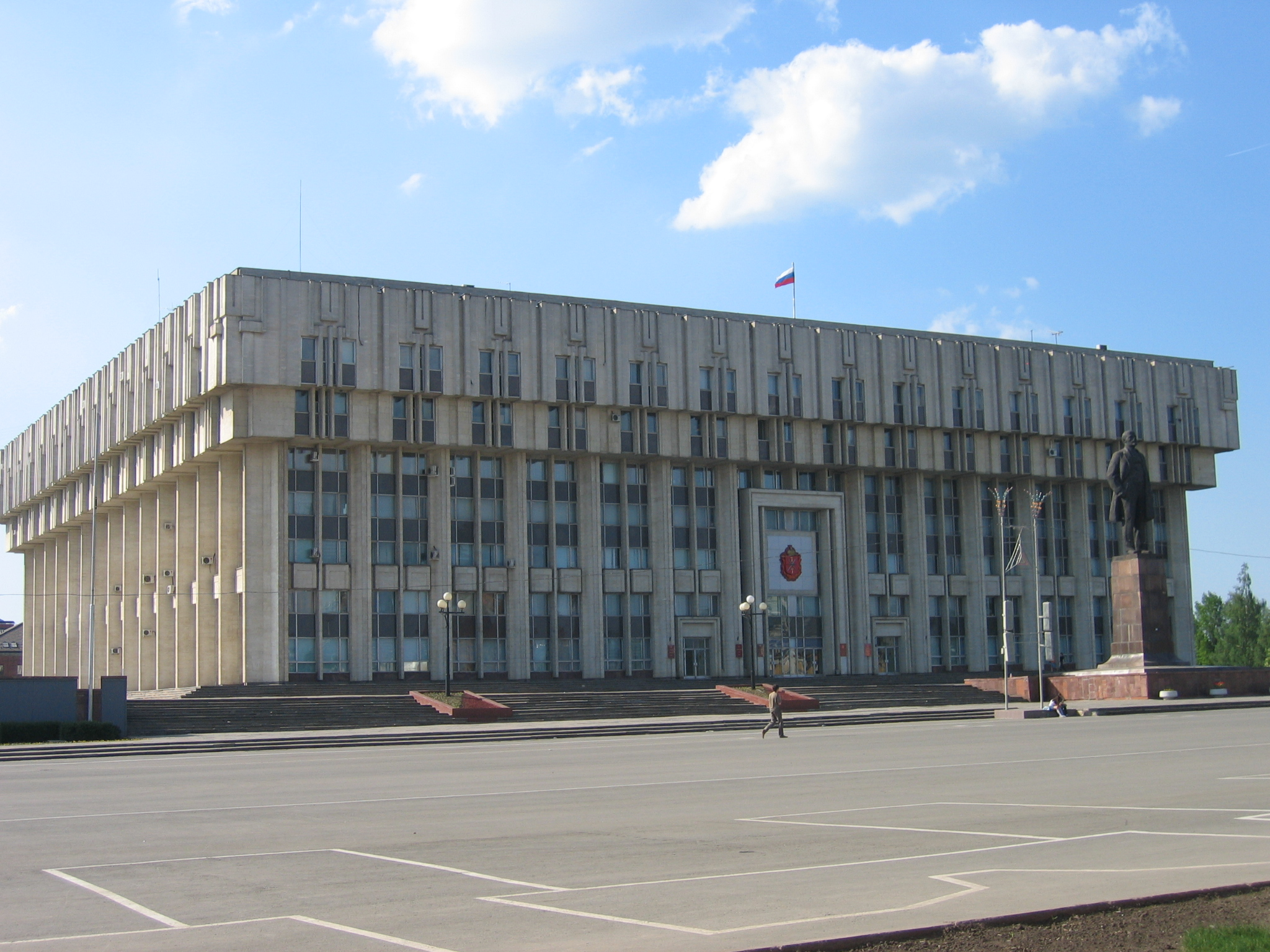
Oblast administration building

During the Soviet period, the high authority in the oblast was shared between three persons: The first secretary of the Tula CPSU Committee (who in reality had the biggest authority), the chairman of the oblast Soviet (legislative power), and the Chairman of the oblast Executive Committee (executive power). Since 1991, CPSU lost all the power, and the head of the Oblast administration, and eventually the governor was appointed/elected alongside elected regional parliament.

The Charter of Tula Oblast is the fundamental law of the region. The Tula Oblast Duma is the province's standing legislative (representative) body. The Oblast Duma exercises its authority by passing laws, resolutions, and other legal acts and by supervising the implementation and observance of the laws and other legal acts passed by it. The highest executive body is the Oblast Government, which includes territorial executive bodies such as district administrations, committees, and commissions that facilitate development and run the day to day matters of the province. The Oblast administration supports the activities of the Governor who is the highest official and acts as guarantor of the observance of the oblast Charter in accordance with the Constitution of Russia.

=== Local government ===
Representative bodies of urban and rural settlements and urban districts consist of deputies elected in municipal elections. The representative body of the municipal district consists of the heads of settlements that are part of the municipal district, and of deputies of the representative bodies of these settlements, elected by the representative bodies of the settlements from among their members in accordance with the same norm of representation, regardless of the population of the settlement. The term of office of representative bodies of cities, rural settlements, city districts, and municipal districts is 5 years, with some exceptions when the term is 3 years. Local government bodies in the Tula Oblast are headed by 103 heads of municipalities and 84 heads of municipal administrations.

In accordance with the regional law of 2017, village elders carry out activities to organize interaction between local government bodies and residents of rural settlements when resolving issues of local importance. As of 1 November 2022, 1,071 village elders operate in 23 municipal districts and urban districts. Their powers extend to the territory of more than 1,700 settlements, home to about 160,000 inhabitants.

In the Tula Oblast, regional branches of dozens of political parties are registered, the largest in terms of membership being United Russia, the Communist Party of the Russian Federation (CPRF), the Liberal Democratic Party of Russia (LDPR), Patriots of Russia, the Party of Growth, A Just Russia – For Truth, Yabloko, and the Party of Pensioners of Russia.

Since 2011, the "People's Budget" project has been implemented in the Tula Oblast, aimed at identifying and solving socially significant problems in the territories of the region’s municipalities. Project activities are financed from the budget of the Tula Oblast, the budgets of municipalities, and personal funds of residents and sponsors. The target orientation of the "People's Budget" project is to enhance the participation of residents of the Tula Oblast in solving local problems, creating comfortable living conditions, and supporting the initiatives of residents.

In 2022, an annual survey of the population was conducted in the Tula Oblast on the effectiveness of the activities of heads of local government bodies and enterprises operating at the regional and municipal levels, in which 20,141 people participated. Efficiency assessment was carried out according to the following criteria: population satisfaction with the organization of transport services and the quality of roads, housing, and communal services. The overall percentage of satisfaction in municipal areas and urban districts was 88.13% (2020 – 81.01%, 2021 – 83.14%). The highest overall satisfaction rate in the municipalities is Kamensky District – 99.75, Tyoplo-Ogaryovsky District – 99.65%, Chernsky District – 99.12%, Donskoy city – 98.86%. Low satisfaction rates were noted in the municipalities of Kireyevsky District – 73.15%, Zaoksky District – 76.34%, Shchyokinsky District – 77.19%, Tula Urban Okrug – 77.29%, Aleksin city – 77.63%.

== Demographics ==
Population: 1,501,214 (2021 census); 1,553,925 (2010 census); 1,675,758 (2002 census); 1,867,013 (1989 Soviet census).

=== Settlements ===
Largest cities or towns in Tula Oblast 2010 Russian Census
Rank		Administrative Division	Pop.
1	Tula	City of oblast significance of Tula	501,169
2	Novomoskovsk	Novomoskovsky District	131,386
3	Donskoy	Town of oblast significance of Donskoy	64,552
4	Aleksin	Aleksinsky District	61,732
5	Shchyokino	Shchyokinsky District	58,139
6	Uzlovaya	Uzlovsky District	55,282
7	Yefremov	Yefremovsky District	42,350
8	Bogoroditsk	Bogoroditsky District	31,897
9	Kimovsk	Kimovsky District	28,485
10	Kireyevsk	Kireyevsky District	25,557

Historical population
Year	Pop.	±%
1897	1,419,456	—
1926	1,505,263	+6.0%
1959	1,920,308	+27.6%
1970	1,952,467	+1.7%
1979	1,906,176	−2.4%
1989	1,867,013	−2.1%
2002	1,675,758	−10.2%
2010	1,553,925	−7.3%
2021	1,501,214	−3.4%
Source: Census data

Vital statistics for 2024:

- Births: 8,851 (6.0 per 1,000)
- Deaths: 22,324 (15.2 per 1,000)

Total fertility rate (2024):
1.14 children per woman

Life expectancy (2021):
Total — 68.97 years (male — 64.05, female — 73.85)

Ethnic composition (2010):

- Russians – 95.3%
- Ukrainians – 1%
- Armenians – 0.6%
- Tatars – 0.5%
- Azeris – 0.4%
- Romani people – 0.3%
- Belarusians – 0.2%
- Germans – 0.2%
- Others – 1.5%
- 19,778 people were registered from administrative databases, and could not declare an ethnicity. It is estimated that the proportion of ethnicities in this group is the same as that of the declared group.

=== Religion ===
Religion in Tula Oblast as of 2012 (Sreda Arena Atlas)
Russian Orthodoxy	62%
Other Christians	2.3%
Islam	1%
Spiritual but not religious	19%
Atheism and irreligion	13.3%
Other and undeclared	2.4%

According to a 2012 survey 62% of the population of Tula Oblast adheres to the Russian Orthodox Church, 2% are unaffiliated generic Christians, and 1% are Muslims. In addition, 19% of the population are "spiritual but not religious", 13% are atheists, and 3% follow other religions or did not give an answer to the question.

== Economy ==
Tula Oblast is part of the Central economic region. It is a prominent industrial center with metalworking, engineering, coalmining, and chemical industries. Major industrial cities include Novomoskovsk and Aleksin. Historical industries, such as firearm, samovar, and accordion manufacturing, still play an important role in the region.

The oblast also has a developed agricultural sector, which ranks 33rd in Russia in agricultural production. The sector includes farming grain (wheat and rye), potatoes, sugar beets, and vegetable growing, livestock raising, and dairying.

== Culture ==
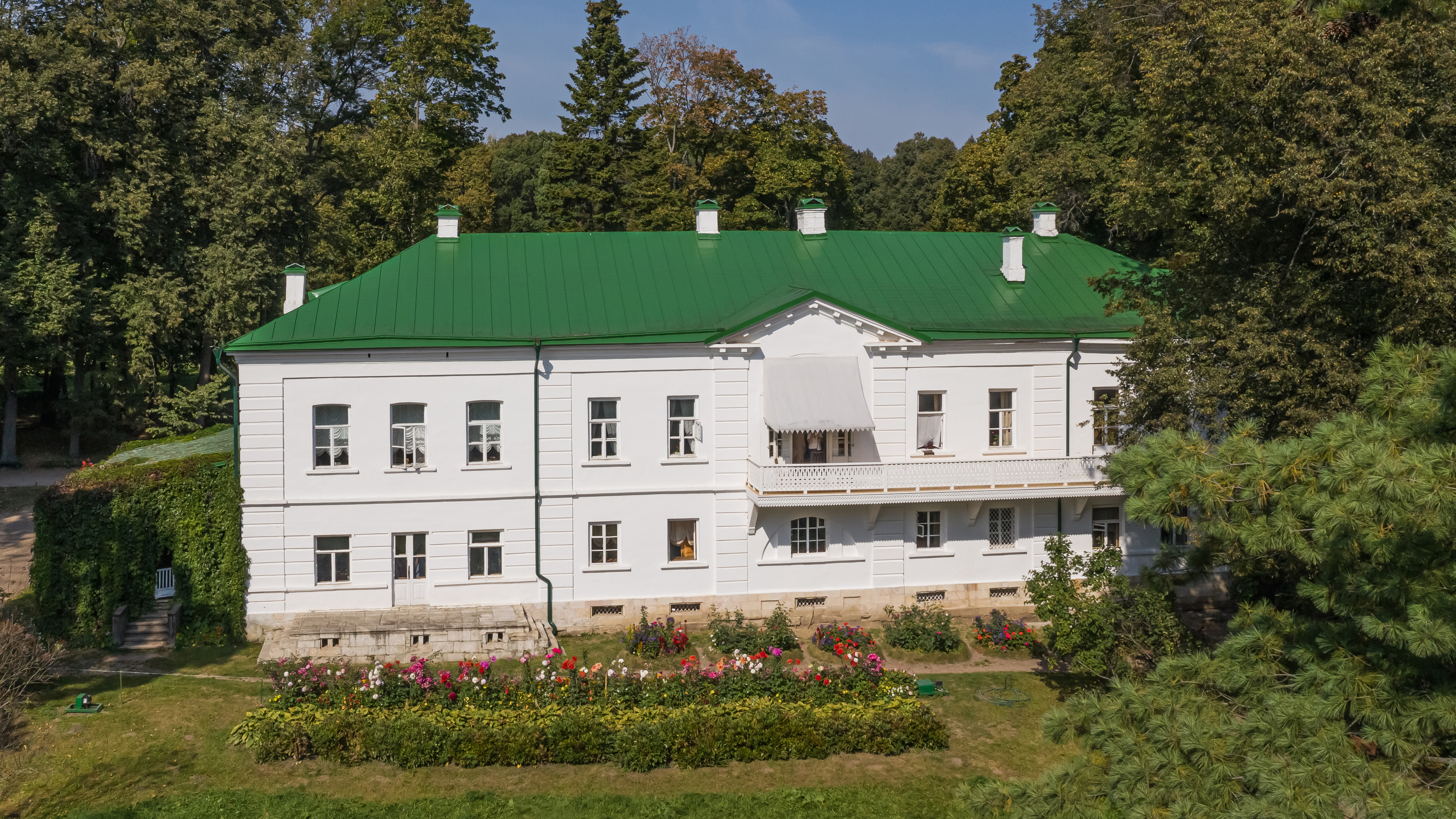
Leo Tolstoy's estate in Yasnaya Polyana

Tula Oblast has more than 100 museums. Several are located in the administrative center of the oblast, the city of Tula, notably the Tula State Arms Museum, the Tula Kremlin, and the Tula Samovar Museum. Another important cultural tourist attractions is the home and country estate of Leo Tolstoy, Yasnaya Polyana, located 12 kilometres (7.5 miles) outside of the city of Tula.

The oblast also has four professional theaters, a philharmonic orchestra, and a circus.

The cuisine of Tula Oblast use the same ingredients as Russian cuisine. Tula pryanik is the most famous dish from the oblast.

== See also ==
- List of Chairmen of the Tula Oblast Duma
- 2005 Moscow power blackouts
- Tula Arms Plant
- Tula Governorate
- Battle of Tula
