= Alexander Akimov (general) =

Soviet military commander

Alexander Ivanovich Akimov
- Born: 12 March 1895; Ivitsy village, Odoyevsky Uyezd, Tula Governorate, Russian Empire
- Died: 2 February 1965 (aged 69) Moscow, Soviet Union
- Allegiance: Russian Empire; Russian SFSR; Soviet Union
- Branch: Imperial Russian Army; Red Army (later Soviet Army
- Service years: 1915–1917; 1918–1955
- Rank: Lieutenant general
- Commands: 73rd Rifle Division; 82nd Motor Rifle Division (became 3rd Guards Motor Rifle Division and 6th Guards Mechanized Corps; 78th Rifle Corps; 73rd Rifle Corps
- Conflicts: World War I; Russian Civil War; Polish–Soviet War; World War II
- Awards: Order of Lenin; Order of the Red Banner (5); Order of Suvorov, 2nd class (2); Order of Kutuzov, 2nd class (2); Order of Bogdan Khmelnitsky, 2nd class

Alexander Ivanovich Akimov (Russian: Александр Иванович Акимов; 12 March 1895 – 2 February 1965) was a Soviet Army lieutenant general.

Akimov fought in World War I and ended the war as an ensign before joining the Red Army, where he rose to battalion commander before the end of the Russian Civil War. During the interwar period, he served in both command and staff positions and commanded the 73rd Rifle Division when Operation Barbarossa began. Akimov was wounded and trapped behind German lines, but escaped after several months. He commanded the 82nd Motor Rifle Division, which became the 3rd Guards Motor Rifle Division and the 6th Guards Mechanized Corps, between 1942 and 1944, and ended the war as commander of the 78th Rifle Corps. Akimov held corps command and military district staff postings postwar before retiring in the 1950s.

== Early life, World War I, and Russian Civil War ==
Akimov was born on 12 March 1895 in the village of Ivitsy, Odoyevsky Uyezd, Tula Governorate. He was drafted into the Imperial Russian Army in August 1915 during World War I and sent to the 201st Infantry Regiment. From October 1916 he fought against Austrian and German troops as a junior commander, and later as a platoon commander with the 36th Siberian Rifle Regiment. After transferring to the 218th Infantry Regiment in March 1917, he briefly served as a platoon commander before becoming a junker at the Tiflis Military School between May and August. Upon completion of an accelerated course there, Akimov received the rank of praporshchik and was appointed a platoon commander in the 77th Infantry Regiment, stationed in Tula. He was later elected chief of the regimental training command.

Akimov joined the Red Guards in December 1917 and became assistant chief of a food detachment. He fought in the suppression of anti-Soviet uprisings in Krapivensky Uyezd, Novosilsky Uyezd, and Bogoroditsky Uyezd. In April 1918 he was transferred to the Red Army and became a battalion commander with the 48th Rifle Regiment, which became part of the 16th Rifle Division in October of that year. Between April and June 1919 he served as a battalion commander of the Tula Regiment and instructor and company commander of the Tula Governorate Communist Battalion of the Moscow Military District before returning to the 16th Division. He fought in battles against the Don Army and from June 1920 was chief of the training detachment of the 47th Rifle Brigade of the division, fighting on the Western Front during the Polish–Soviet War.

== Interwar period ==
In November 1920, Akimov became deputy battalion commander of the Tula Governorate Special Purpose Regiment, later serving as a company and battalion commander. From October 1922 he was a company commander in the 216th Rifle Regiment and Tula Territorial Battalion, then served as assistant commander and commander of the 113th Special Purpose Battalion. Transferred to the 84th Rifle Division in June 1924, he served as an assistant battalion commander of the 251st Rifle Regiment and as commander of the 1st and 2nd Separate Guard Companies for the protection of arms factories of the district. In November 1926 he took command of the 43rd Separate Local Rifle Company, and from December 1927 was adjutant of the 1st category and acting chief of staff of the Separate Territorial Reserve Rifle Battalion of the Ryazan Territorial District.

He became assistant chief of staff of the 144th Rifle Regiment in December 1929 and in November 1930 entered the Vystrel course. After graduating from the latter in April 1931, he was appointed chief of the 4th Staff Department of the 81st Rifle Division of the same district, and in June of that year transferred to the 29th Rifle Regiment of the Leningrad Military District, where he served as chief of the regimental school and assistant regimental commander for personnel.

Akimov was transferred to the Leningrad Infantry School in February 1933, serving as a tactics leader, acting company commander, acting chief of material and technical support of the school, and tactics instructor. In December 1937 he became acting assistant chief of the school for material and technical support. Akimov was transferred became assistant commander of the 104th Mountain Rifle Division of the district in July 1939, and fought with it in the Winter War, receiving the Order of the Red Banner for his actions. From March 1940 he served as chief of infantry of the 48th Rifle Division of the Kalinin Military District, and in July took command of the 73rd Rifle Division of the Moscow Military District as a colonel. He completed three courses at the night school faculty of the Frunze Military Academy in 1941.

== World War II ==
After Operation Barbarossa began, Akimov led the division in defensive battles as part of the 20th Army of the Western Front near Borisov, Orsha, and Smolensk during the Battle of Smolensk. In August 1941 he was wounded and was trapped in German-held territory in Vyazemsky District, Smolensk Oblast. After recovering, he formed a partisan detachment and reached Soviet lines in the sector of the 33rd Army of the Western Front. He became commander of the 82nd Motor Rifle Division (the 3rd Guards Motor Rifle Division from March) in February 1942 as part of the 29th and later the 5th Armies of the Western Front. Akimov was promoted to major general on 21 May 1942 and to lieutenant general on 15 December 1943. In July 1943 the division was converted into the 6th Guards Mechanized Corps and joined the 4th Tank Army. Under the command of Akimov, the corps fought in the Battle of Kursk, the Proskurov–Chernovitsy Offensive and the Lvov–Sandomierz Offensive, during which it captured Kamenets-Podolsky, Peremyshlyany, Lvov, and Komarno. From 22 January 1945 to the end of the war, Akimov commanded the 78th Rifle Corps of the 52nd Army of the 1st Ukrainian Front. He led it in the Sandomierz–Silesian Offensive, the Lower Silesian Offensive, the Berlin Offensive, and the Prague Offensive. For his "heroism and courage" in the crossing of the Oder and "skillful command" of the corps, Akimov was awarded the Order of Kutuzov, 2nd class and the Order of Suvorov, 2nd class.

== Postwar ==
After the end of the war, Akimov became commander of the 73rd Rifle Corps of the Carpathian Military District in July 1946. Sent to study at the Higher Academic Courses of the Voroshilov Higher Military Academy in June 1948, he was appointed assistant commander of the 5th Army of the Primorsky Military District upon graduation in April 1949. Appointed assistant commander for higher educational institutions of the Odessa Military District in November 1951, he transferred to serve in the same post with the Volga Military District in July 1953. After retiring in October 1955, Akimov lived in Moscow, where he died on 2 February 1965.

== Awards and honors ==
Akimov was a recipient of the following decorations:

- Order of Lenin
- Order of the Red Banner (5)
- Order of Suvorov, 2nd class (2)
- Order of Kutuzov, 2nd class (2)
- Order of Bogdan Khmelnitsky, 2nd class
