= Andrey Bolotov =

Russian memoirist and agriculturalist

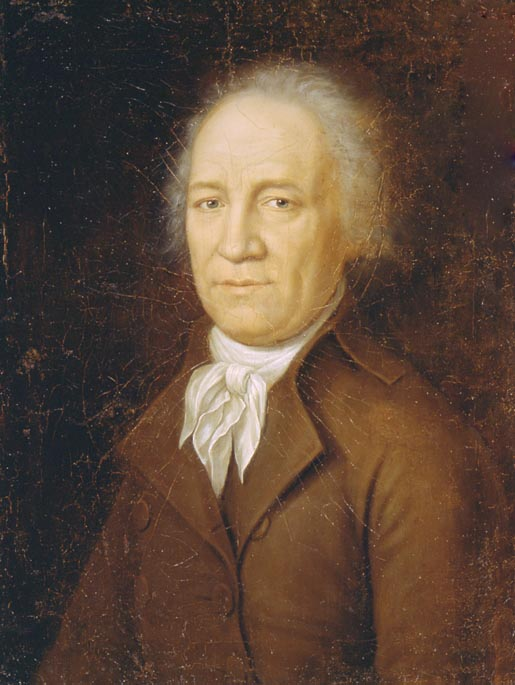
- Andrey Bolotov
- Born: 18 October 1738; Dvoryaninovo, Kashirsky Uyezd, Tula Governorate, Russian Empire
- Died: 16 October 1833 (aged 94); Dvoryaninovo, Aleksinsky Uyezd, Tula Governorate, Russian Empire
- Scientific career
- Fields: Philosophy, Agriculture

Andrey Timofeyevich Bolotov (Russian: Андрей Тимофеевич Болотов; 18 October 1738 – 16 October 1833) was the most prolific memoirist and the most distinguished agriculturist of the 18th-century Russian Empire.

Bolotov was born and spent most of his adult life in the family estate of Dvoryaninovo, in the Tula region to the south of Moscow. He was brought up by his parents in Livland, where his father's regiment was stationed. After taking part in the Seven Years' War he settled into retirement in Dvoryaninovo.

During his life there, he brought out a pioneering manual on crop rotation and elaborated an innovative system of pomology which included more than 600 cultivars of apple and pear. Always interested in plant breeding, Bolotov discovered dichogamy of apple-trees and pointed out to the advantages of cross-pollination.

Bolotov's works brought him to the attention of Count Orlov, who asked him to manage the neighbouring estate of Bobriki, where Catherine II's illegitimate son, Count Bobrinsky, was being raised. Bolotov turned Bobriki into the most up-to-date agricultural estate in provincial Russia and ensured the keen interest which later Counts Bobrinsky would take in agriculture.

Bolotov was also active in the Free Economic Society, which published his treatise on forestry. Together with Nikolay Novikov, he edited the journals The Village Resident (1778–79) and The Magazine of Economics (1780–89), which brought him the income of 400 roubles a year, a very considerable sum for the time. His extensive memoirs, entitled Life and Adventures of Andrei Bolotov, in 26 parts and written between 1789 and 1816, went through several editions and were translated into English. Bolotov died in Dvoryaninovo aged 94. Thomas Newlin wrote of him:

Andrey Timofeevich Bolotov stands out as the most prolific writer that Russia has ever produced, penning, by one estimate, the equivalent of some 350 volumes of written material—memoirs, diaries, letters, poems, plays, criticism, and translations, as well as a vast array of other works of literary, philosophical, religious, didactic, scientific, agricultural, and historical natures—over the course of his long and quietly astonishing career. During his lifetime Bolotov achieved a modest measure of recognition as a writer on agricultural and horticultural issues; he is best known today, however, for his massive [memoirs]. Because only a relatively small portion of what he wrote found its way into print[...] Bolotov, despite his phenomenal productivity and his considerable originality as a writer, ended up having virtually no influence on the development of Russian belle-lettres.
