= Alexander Voznesensky =

Soviet economist

Alexander Alexeyevich Voznesensky (Russian: Александр Алексеевич Вознесенский) (March 5, 1898 – October 28, 1950) was a Soviet statesman, economist and brother of Nikolai Voznesensky.

== Biography ==
Born in the village of Golovkino in Novosilsky Uyezd of Tula Governorate (now in Oryol Oblast), he spent his childhood in Chern. His father, Alexey Dmitrievich Voznesensky, worked in a timber yard. His mother, Lyubov Georgievna, was a housewife. He had three younger siblings Maria, Nikolai and Valentine).

In 1917, he enrolled at the Petrograd Institute of History and Philology; in 1921, he joined the Social Sciences Faculty of Petrograd University, graduating in 1923, and soon began to teach. He joined the All-Union Communist Party (b) in 1927.

His younger brother Nikolai Voznesensky, also an economist, was appointed to the Politburo of the Communist Party of the Soviet Union in February 1941, becoming responsible for much of the planning of the Soviet economy and twice holding the directorship of Gosplan.

Alexander served as the rector of Leningrad State University from 1941 to 1948 and in the spring of 1942 he organized the evacuation of the university to Saratov. In 1947, Voznesensky was elected to the Supreme Soviet of the Soviet Union and in 1948 was appointed Minister of Education of the Russian SFSR.

As his brother fell from favour with Joseph Stalin, in the wake of the Leningrad affair, Alexander was also arrested and tortured in August 1949. Although Nikolai Bulganin (Minister for Defense) was friends with Alexander, he could not risk helping him, in case he would also be implicated.

On August 19, 1949, he was arrested on charges of treason, participation in a counterrevolutionary organization, and anti-Soviet agitation (the Leningrad Affair). He was convicted and executed in 1950. He was rehabilitated on May 14, 1954.
