= Gritsovsky =

Gritsovsky Грицовский
- Urban-type settlement
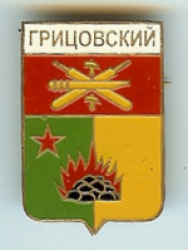
- Coat of arms
- Location of Gritsovsky
- Location of Gritsovsky Gritsovsky (Tula Oblast)
- Coordinates: 54°08′15″N 38°09′38″E
- Country: Russia
- Federal subject: Tula Oblast
- Administrative district: Venyovsky District
- Urban-Type Settlement: Gritsovsky
- Founded: 1954
- Urban-type settlement status since: 1965

Area
  - Total: 1.52 km^{2} (0.59 sq mi)

Population (2010 Census)
  - Total: 6,192
  - Density: 4,100/km^{2} (11,000/sq mi)

Administrative status
  - Capital of: Gritsovsky Urban-Type Settlement

Municipal status
  - Municipal district: Venyovsky Municipal District
  - Urban settlement: Gritsovsky Urban Settlement
  - Capital of: Gritsovsky Urban Settlement
- Time zone: UTC+3 (MSK)
- Postal code(s): 301318
- OKTMO ID: 70612420101

Gritsovsky population
- 2010 Census: 6,192
- 2002 Census: 6,759
- 1989 Census: 7,720
- 1979 Census: 7,174

Gritsovsky (Russian: Грицо́вский) is an urban locality (an urban-type settlement) in Venyovsky District of Tula Oblast, Russia, located 40 kilometers (25 mi) north of Venyov, the administrative center of the district, and 25 kilometers (16 mi) north of Novomoskovsk. As of the 2010 Census, its population was 6,192.

== History ==
It was founded in 1954 as a village to house the miners at the Gryzlov lignite mine. Its name derives from that of the Gritsovo railway station which lies 1 kilometer (0.62 mi) to the east. In 1965, Gritsovsky was granted urban-type settlement status.

Gritsovsky reached its peak population of about 9,000 before the dissolution of the Soviet Union. Subsequently, the mines were privatized, followed by decreased demand for lignite, with the result that the last mine in the area closed in 2009.

A regional hospital was built in Gritsovsky in 1995, and in the 2000s a refrigerator factory (PZH, Podolsk) was built.

== Administrative and municipal status ==
Within the framework of administrative divisions, the urban-type settlement of Gritsovsky is incorporated within Venyovsky District as Venyovsky Urban-Type Settlement. As a municipal division, Gritsovsky Urban-Type Settlement is incorporated within Venyovsky Municipal District as Gritsovsky Urban Settlement.
