= Praskovya Ivanovskaya =

Russian revolutionary

- Прасковья Ивановская
- Born: Praskovya Semyonovna Ivanovskaya; Праско́вья Семёновна Ивано́вская; 3 November 1852; Sokovnino, Chernsky Uyezd, Tula Governorate, Russian Empire
- Died: 19 September 1935 (aged 82); Poltava, Ukraine
- Relatives: Vladimir Korolenko (brother-in-law)

Praskovya Ivanovskaya (Russian: Праско́вья Ивано́вская; 3 November 1852 – 19 September 1935) was a Russian revolutionary, typist, Narodnik and member of Narodnaya Volya and the Socialist-Revolutionary Party.

== Early life ==
Praskovya Semyonovna Ivanovskaya (Russian: Праско́вья Семёновна Ивано́вская was born on 3 November [o.s. 15] 1852 in the village of Sokovnino, Russian Empire (present-day Russia). Ivanovskaya was the daughter of an Orthodox village priest. and her mother died when she was young. Ivanovskaya had 5 siblings including the revolutionaries Alexandra Semyonovna Ivanovskaya, Evdokia Ivanovskaya and Vasily Ivanovsky.

Ivanovskaya was educated at a church boarding school. In 1873, Praskovya moved to St. Petersburg and enrolled in the Alarchinksy classes.

== Revolutionary life ==
After finishing her studies, Praskovya moved to Odessa where she immediately made contact with other radicals living in the city. She worked distributing socialist propaganda to factory workers by day while providing literacy lessons in the evening.

In the summer of 1876, Ivanovskaya found work as a farm labourer in Ukraine, with intentions to spreading information on the Zemlya i volya (Land and liberty) movement. However, this did not quite work out as she had hoped, for she was so exhausted by the end of the day's work that she had little energy for propaganda work.

After the split of "Zemlya i volya", she became a member of the more radical break away faction, Narodnaya Volya (the Peoples Will), which favoured a policy of terrorism.

She was then briefly imprisoned, and after her release lived in an émigré colony of Russian radicals in Romania.

Later in 1880, Ivanovskaya returned to Russia where she worked in an underground printing plant producing propaganda for Narodnaya Volya, one job having been to print leaflets explaining why they had assassinated Emperor Alexander II of Russia.

Following the assassination of Alexander II, several members of Narodnaya Volya were arrested and on 3 April 1881, and many were subsequently hanged.

Ivanovskaya was arrested and charged with involvement in the assassination. She was sentenced to death, with the sentence being reduced to life, hard labour.

After fifteen years she was released from prison, but was sent to Siberia. In 1903, she escaped and went into hiding, joining the Socialist Revolutionary Party and became involved with the SR Combat Organisation. In 1904, she helped the organisation in the assassination of the Minister of Interior, Vyacheslav Plehve.

Ivanovskaya became one of many revolutionaries to be betrayed by Evno Azef, which led to her arrest and imprisonment, however was granted amnesty as part of Nicholas II concessions following the 1905 revolution.

In 1925, Ivanovskaya published her autobiography.

== Personal life ==
Ivanovskaya was married to Innokenty Voloshenko. Through her sister Evdokiya, Ivanovskaya was the aunt of Sofia Korolenko and sister-in-law of Vladimir Korolenko.
