= Plava =

Plava may refer to:

== Places ==
- Plava (Russia), a tributary of the Upa river in Tula Oblast, Russia
- Plava River (Kosovo), a river flowing through Dragash, Kosovo, and parts of Albania
- Plav, Montenegro, a town in Montenegro, known as Plava in Albanian and some English sources
- Plave, Kanal (Italian: Plava), a settlement in Slovenia

== Other uses ==
- Plava, Jewish sponge cake
