= Ivan Pavlov (artist) =

- Иван Павлов
- Born: 5 March 1872; Pavlovka, Kashirsky Uyezd, Russian Empire
- Died: 30 August 1951 (aged 79); Moscow, Russian SFSR, Soviet Union
- Resting place: Novodevichy Cemetery, Moscow
- Education: Moscow School of Painting, Sculpture and Architecture
- Known for: Woodcuts and linocuts

Ivan Nikolaevich Pavlov (Russian: Иван Николаевич Павлов; March 5, 1872 – August 30, 1951) was a Russian draughtsman and printmaker during the Modernist period, active in Moscow, best known for his woodcuts and linocuts.

== Biography ==
Born on March 5 (17), 1872, in the village of Popovka (now Kashirsky District, Moscow Oblast) to a cantonist family who worked as a prison paramedic and, from 1877, as a guard at the Cathedral of Christ the Saviour for 15 years.

He studied at the Stieglitz Central School of Technical Drawing and the Drawing School of the Society for the Encouragement of the Arts, the workshop of Vasily Mate (1891–1892) in St. Petersburg.

He was one of the first full members of the USSR Academy of Arts (since 1947). He held the title People's Artist of the RSFSR and was a laureate of the Stalin Prize, second degree (both in 1943).

He taught at the Stroganov School of Art and Design (1907–1914), the Art School at the I. D. Sytin Printing and Lithography Company (from 1915), and the Free Art Workshops (Vkhutemas) (1917–1922) in Moscow. Pavlov's students include Vladimir Sokolov, Mikhail Matorin, Olga Tayozhnaya.

He was a member of the Association of Artists of the Revolutionary Russia since 1925. He was a full member of the Academy of Arts of the USSR since 1947.

== Awards ==
- People's Artist of the RSFSR (1943)
- Stalin Prize, Second Degree (1943) – for long-term outstanding achievements in the field of art.
- Order of the Red Banner of Labour (1943)
