= Nikolai Voznesensky =

Soviet politician and economist (1903–1950)

- Николай Вознесенский
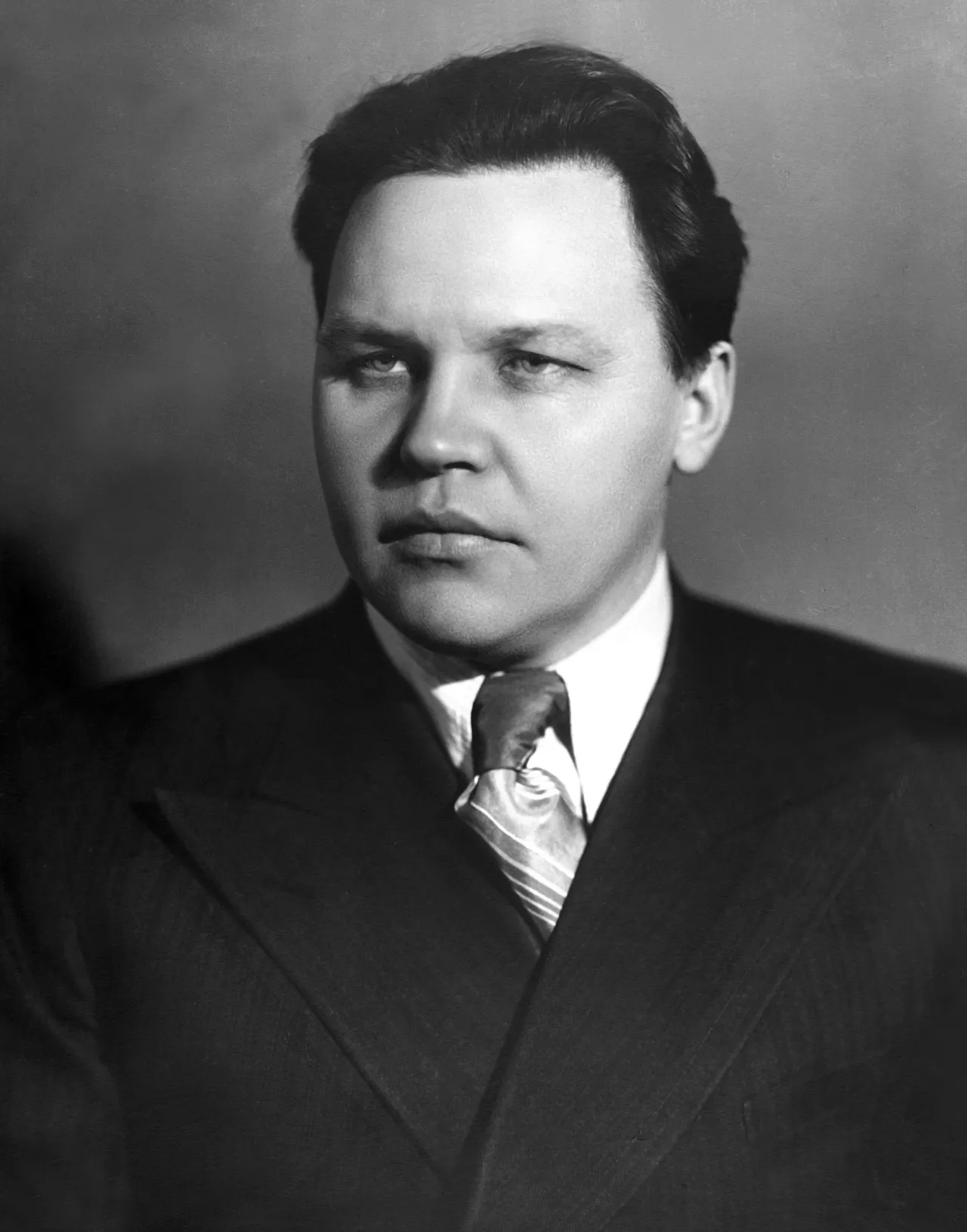

Chairman of the State Planning Committee of the Soviet Union
- In office 8 December 1942 – 5 March 1949
- Premier: Joseph Stalin
- Preceded by: Maksim Saburov
- Succeeded by: Maksim Saburov
- In office 19 January 1938 – 10 March 1941
- Premier: Vyacheslav Molotov
- Preceded by: Valery Mezhlauk
- Succeeded by: Maksim Saburov

First Deputy Chairman of the Council of People's Commissars of the Soviet Union
- In office 10 March 1941 – 15 March 1946
- Premier: Vyacheslav Molotov; Joseph Stalin
- Preceded by: Valerian Kuybyshev
- Succeeded by: Vyacheslav Molotov

Full member of the 18th Politburo
- In office 26 February 1947 – 7 March 1949

Candidate member of the 18th Politburo
- In office 21 February 1941 – 26 February 1947

Personal details
- Born: 1 December [O.S. 18 November] 1903 Tula Governorate, Russian Empire
- Died: 1 October 1950 (aged 46) Leningrad, Russian SFSR, Soviet Union
- Citizenship: Soviet
- Party: Russian Communist Party (Bolsheviks) (1919–1949)
- Relations: Alexander Voznesensky (brother)

Nikolai Alekseevich Voznesensky (Russian: Никола́й Алексе́евич Вознесе́нский, 1 December [O.S. 18 November] 1903 – 1 October 1950) was a Soviet politician and economic planner who oversaw the running of Gosplan (the USSR's State Planning Committee) during the German–Soviet War of 1941–1945. A protégé of Andrei Zhdanov, Voznesensky was appointed Deputy Premier in May 1940. He became directly involved in the recovery of production associated with the evacuation of industry eastwards after the start of the war. His 1947 work The Economy of the USSR during World War II (Russian: Военная экономика СССР в период Отечественной войны, lit. 'The war economy of the USSR in the time of the Patriotic War') records those years.

Following the war, Voznesensky was persecuted during the 1949–1950 Leningrad affair. In a secret trial, he was found guilty of treason, sentenced to death and executed immediately. The Military Collegium of the Supreme Court of the Soviet Union rehabilitated him in 1954.

Voznesensky was a close associate of Alexei Kosygin and of Mikhail Rodionov.

== Biography ==
=== Early life ===
Nikolai Voznesensky was born in Tula in the family of a clerk of a forestry office. He was the younger brother of Alexander Voznesensky. His first job was as an apprentice locksmith.

Voznesensky joined the Komsomol in 1919 and quickly rose through its ranks becoming the editor in chief of the Kommunar newspaper which was the official organ of the Tula Komsomol District in 1925.

After graduating from the Sverdlov Communist University he was sent to study at the economic faculty of the Institute of Red Professors in 1928 and later himself became a professor of the institute from 1931. In 1935 he was awarded the academic degree of Doctor of Economics.

=== Rise to power and World War II ===
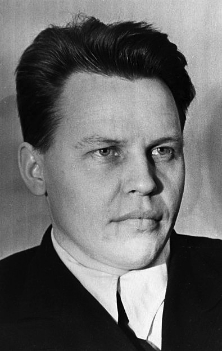
Voznesensky in 1938

Voznesensky was quickly rising through the ranks of the party with the help of his mentor Andrei Zhdanov. In 1934 he became a member of the Central Control Commission and was the representative of the party control commission in Donetsk. From 1935 to 1937 he was the head of the Leningrad Control Commission, after which he enjoyed rapid promotion during the Great Purge, when mass arrests opened up vacancies at the most senior level. In November 1937 he was appointed deputy head of the State Planning Committee (Gosplan), of which he was then appointed chairman in 1938 after the previous incumbent, Valery Mezhlauk had been arrested.

In March 1941 Voznesensky gave up the chairmanship of Gosplan, but he was elected as a candidate member of the Politburo of the VKP (b), and he received the newly created post of Deputy Chairman of the Council of People's Commissars (Sovnarkom, roughly the Soviet Union's Cabinet of Ministers), making him of the most powerful men in the Soviet Union at the age of thirty eight.

During the German-Soviet War he was responsible for putting the economy on a war footing. In 1942, he was co-opted onto the State Defense Committee, and was again chairman of Gosplan, 1942–49. On 20 August 1945, after the Atomic bombings of Hiroshima and Nagasaki, he was appointed to the Special Committee on the use of Atomic Energy, which was responsible for developing a Soviet atomic bomb.

=== Post World War II ===
After the war, Voznesensky resumed his position as a Deputy Chairman of the Council of Ministers. In March 1946, he presented the first post-war Five Year Plan. In October 1946, in an incident that later formed part of Nikita Khrushchev's seminal Secret Speech to the 20th party congress, Voznesensky was co-opted onto the 'Politburo Commission for Foreign Affairs' whose remit was being expanded to include 'internal construction and domestic policy' The implication is that Stalin created this committee as a way of excluding certain members of the Politburo from the decision-making process, including his eventual successor, Georgy Malenkov, who was temporarily out of favour.

From February 28, 1947, to March 7, 1949, Voznesensky was a full member of the Politburo of the All-Union Communist Party.

In December 1947, he published his major work, The Wartime Economy of the USSR during the Great Patriotic War, which won him a Stalin Prize, and 200,000 ruble prize. In it, he forecast that as a result of the absorbing of Eastern Europe into the Soviet sphere of influence "the general crisis of capitalism has become more acute", that the high level of productivity achieved in the USA during the war would be followed by "a new devastating economic crisis and chronic unemployment" and that "having waxed fat on the people's blood during the Second World War, monopoly capitalism of the USA stands now at the head the anti-democratic camp ... and has become the instigator of imperialist expansion everywhere."

The book was a refutation of the views of the Hungarian economist, Eugen Varga, who forecast a softening of some of the harsher features of capitalism, and argued that the East European countries occupied by the Red Army did not amount to a huge loss to world capitalism. Varga was not an important figure like Voznesensky, but was allowed to defend himself, implying that he had powerful protection. Historians such as Robert Conquest and Gavriel Ra'anan have interpreted the debate as part of a power struggle between Zhdanov and his main rivals in the Politburo, Malenkov and Lavrentiy Beria.

== The Leningrad Affair ==
Deprived of the protection of Andrei Zhdanov, who died in August 1948, Voznesensky was the loser in a power struggle with Lavrentiy Beria and Georgy Malenkov. On March 7, 1949, he was removed from the post of deputy chairman of the Council of Ministers of the USSR and from the Politburo, and was replaced as chairman of Gosplan by Maksim Saburov, a protege of Malenkov. According to Khrushchev:

For a period, after Voznesensky was put on ice, he still used to come to dinner at Stalin's. He was a changed man. He wasn't the same bright, self-assured, tough-minded Voznesensky I'd known earlier. In fact, it was precisely these virtues which had been his undoing. While chairman of state planning, he was brave enough to tangle with Beria. He had sought to redistribute the country's economic resources more evenly, and this meant taking money away from certain commissariats which enjoyed Beria's patronage ... Voznesensky dared to cross Beria's path, and before Beria finished with him, Voznesensky was just a shadow of his former self.

In a resolution adopted by the Central Committee, Voznesensky was accused of being purposefully responsible for "...the disappearance of secret documents in the USSR State Planning Committee". He was arrested on October 27, 1949, and was sentenced to death on the night of September 30, 1950. He is believed to have been shot shortly after the verdict was announced.

Voznesensky was posthumously rehabilitated by the Military Collegium of the Supreme Court of the Soviet Union on April 30, 1954, and his membership was reinstated in the Communist Party of the Soviet Union.

== Honours and awards ==
- Two Orders of Lenin
- Stalin Prize – 1947
