= Mikhail Kuznetsov (pilot) =

Soviet flying ace during the Second World War (1913-1989)

Mikhail Vasilyevich Kuznetsov
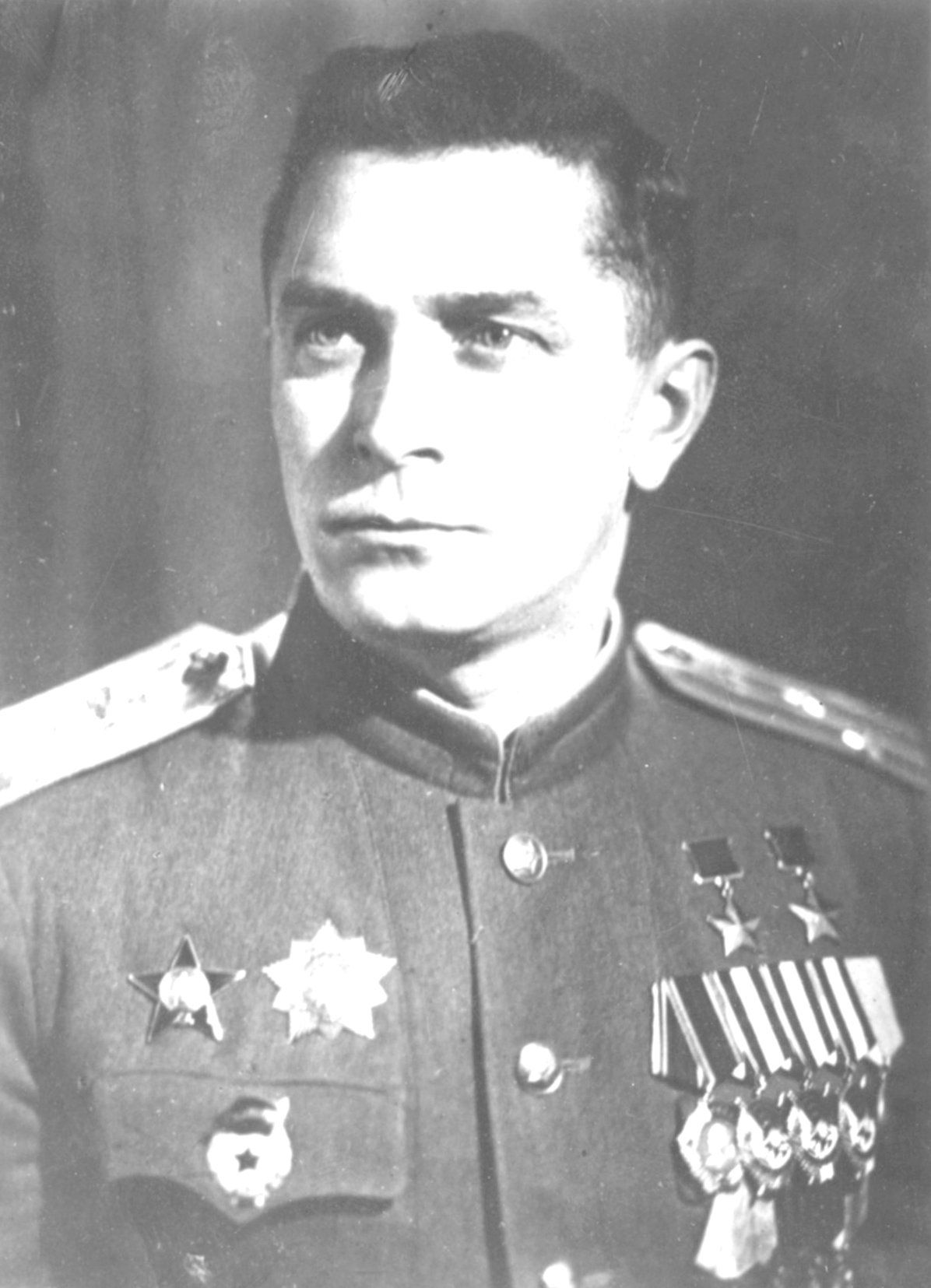
- Native name: Михаил Васильевич Кузнецов
- Born: 7 November [O.S. 25 October] 1913; Village Agarino, Kashirsky Uyezd, Tula Governorate, Russian Empire
- Died: 15 December 1989 (aged 76) Moscow, Soviet Union
- Allegiance: Soviet Union
- Branch: Soviet Air Force
- Service years: 1933–1974
- Rank: General-major of Aviation
- Commands: 106th Guards Fighter Aviation Regiment
- Conflicts: World War II; Invasion of Poland; Winter War; Eastern Front
- Awards: Hero of the Soviet Union (twice)

Mikhail Vasilyevich Kuznetsov (Russian: Михаи́л Васи́льевич Кузнецо́в; 7 November [O.S. 25 October] 1913 – 15 December 1989) was a regimental commander flying ace in the Soviet Air Forces during the Second World War who was twice awarded the title Hero of the Soviet Union. After the war he became a general-major.

== Early life ==
Kuznetsov was born on 7 November [O.S. 25 October] 1913 to a Russian family in Agarino village, located within the present-day borders of the Moscow oblast. Having moved to the city of Moscow in 1921, he went on to complete his seventh grade of school in 1930, after which he worked as an electrician at a tannery until 1932. From then until he entering the military in mid 1933 he worked for the Komsomol of Kirovsky district of the city, serving as deputy chairman of a bureau of young pioneers, secretary of a university Komsomol committee, and secretary of a factory Komsomol committee. After graduating from the Yeisk Military School of Marine and Observer Pilots in December 1934 he was assigned to the 6th Light Bomber Aviation Squadron as a pilot. Later he transferred to the 106th Fighter Aviation Squadron, and in August 1938 he became adjutant and assistant squadron commander in the 15th Fighter Aviation Regiment. In that position he saw combat during the Soviet invasion of Poland and later the Winter War with Finland, during which he flew sorties on the I-153. After leaving the warfront he attended training for squadron commanders in Lipetsk.

== World War II ==
Almost immediately after completing training to become a squadron commander in June 1941 he was deployed with his previous regiment to combat the German invasion of the Soviet Union; before leaving the unit in March 1942 he had been promoted to navigator; after briefly serving as deputy commander of the 1st Reserve Fighter Aviation Regiment he took command of the 814th Fighter Aviation Regiment in June that year. Despite holding the high post of regimental commander he frequently flew combat sorties and participated in aerial battles, resulting him tallying enough shootdowns of enemy to be nominated for the title Hero of the Soviet Union on 2 August 1943 for having totaled 245 sorties, entered 53 dogfights, and gained 17 solo aerial victories. That month his regiment was awarded the guards designation and renamed as the 106th Guards Fighter Aviation Regiment. Later in the war on 22 February 1945 he and his comrades flying in a group of six Yak-1s participated in an intense aerial battle with a large group of German FW-190s; during the engagement Kuznetsov personally shot down two of them. In April he was nominated for a second gold star, which was awarded after the surrender of Nazi Germany.

Throughout the war he fought on the Northwest, Leningrad, Kalinin, West, Southwest, 1st Ukrainian, and 3rd Ukrainian fronts, participating in the battles for Leningrad, the Baltics, Kursk, Lviv, Silesia, Berlin, and Prague. During the conflict his unit was one of the highest-performing fighter regiments in the Soviet Air Forces, tallying 296 enemy aircraft shot down in addition to 18 destroyed on the ground. By the end of the war he totaled 344 sorties, participating in 73 aerial battles, tallying 19 solo and one shared shootdown while flying the MiG-3, Yak-1, and Yak-9. (Note: Kuznetsov also flew the I-153 and Hawker Hurricane during the war, but did not gain any aerial victories in them.)

== Postwar ==
Kuznetsov remained in command of the 106th Guards Fighter Aviation Regiment until July 1945. From then until February 1946 he served as the deputy commander of the 11th Guards Fighter Aviation Division; afterwards he attended the Air Force Academy in Monino. Upon graduation from the academy in 1951 he headed the Chernigov Military Aviation School of Pilots until December 1955, for the next four years afterwards he headed the 10th Military Aviation School. Earlier in 1959 he had been promoted to the rank of general-major. From December 1959 to October 1961 he was deputy commander of 69th Air Army, after which he became deputy commander of the 37th Reserve Air Force (Note: Renamed as the 4th Reserve Air Force in April 1968.) where he remained until December 1969. He then served as deputy commander of the Air Force of the Moscow Military District until he retired from the military in February 1974; in 1972 he was featured in the Soviet magazine "Aviation and Cosmonautics" in an article about his wartime exploits as well as his status as a general. After retiring from the air force he worked as a senior engineer, sector head, and eventually lead engineer at the Scientific Experimental Center for Air Traffic Control Automation. Having retired in 1988, he lived in Moscow, where he died on 15 December 1989 and was buried in the Troyekurovskoye Cemetery.

== Awards ==
- Twice Hero of the Soviet Union (8 September 1943 and 27 June 1945)
- Order of Lenin (8 September 1943)
- Four Orders of the Red Banner (26 February 1942, 28 February 1943, 24 April 1945, and 3 November 1953)
- Order of Bogdan Khmelnitsky, 2nd class (23 September 1943)
- Order of the Patriotic War, 1st class (11 March 1985)
- Two Orders of the Red Star (3 December 1941 and 20 June 1949)
- Order of the Red Banner of Labour (22 February 1968)
