= Chern (disambiguation) =

Chern may refer to:

- Shiing-Shen Chern (1911–2004), Chinese-American mathematician
  - Chern class, a type of characteristics class associated to complex vector bundles; named after Shiing-Shen Chern
- Chern, Russia, several inhabited localities in Russia
- Chern, medieval fortress on the modern location of Chernivtsi, Ukraine
