= Chern, Russia =

Chern (Russian: Чернь) is the name of several inhabited localities in Russia.

Urban localities

- Chern, Tula Oblast, a work settlement in Chernsky District of Tula Oblast

Rural localities

- Chern, Oryol Oblast, a selo in Lomovetsky Selsoviet of Trosnyansky District of Oryol Oblast
- Chern, Smolensk Oblast, a village in Slobodskoye Rural Settlement of Ugransky District of Smolensk Oblast
