= Venyovsky Uyezd =

Venyovsky Uyezd (Венёвский уезд) was one of the subdivisions of the Tula Governorate of the Russian Empire. It was situated in the northeastern part of the governorate. Its administrative centre was Venyov.

== Demographics ==
At the time of the Russian Empire Census of 1897, Venyovsky Uyezd had a population of 104,228. Of these, 99.9% spoke Russian as their native language.
