= Yepifansky Uyezd =

Yepifansky Uyezd (Епифанский уезд) was one of the subdivisions of the Tula Governorate of the Russian Empire. It was situated in the eastern part of the governorate. Its administrative centre was Yepifan.

== Demographics ==
At the time of the Russian Empire Census of 1897, Yepifansky Uyezd had a population of 114,670. Of these, 99.9% spoke Russian as their native language.
