= General Kuznetsov =

General Kuznetsov may refer to:

- Fyodor Kuznetsov (1898–1961), Soviet Army colonel general
- Mikhail Kuznetsov (pilot) (1913–1989), Soviet Air Force major general
- Vasily Kuznetsov (general) (1894–1964), Soviet Army colonel general
- Yuri Viktorovich Kuznetsov (1946–2020), Russian Airborne Forces major general
