= Krapivna, Tula Oblast =

Rural locality in Shchyokinsky District, Tula Oblast, Russia

Coordinates: 53°56′N 37°10′E

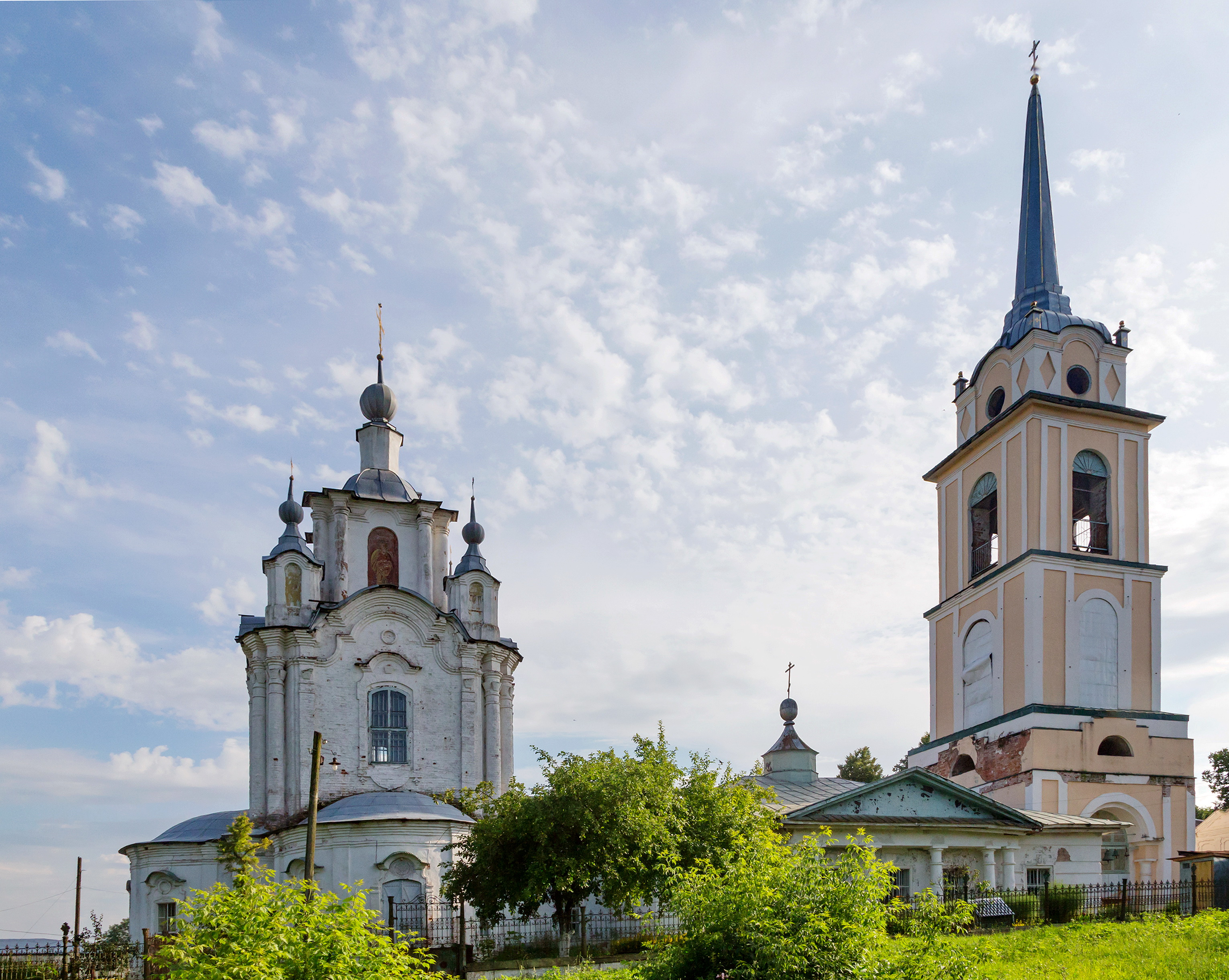
The cathedral of St Nicholas

Krapivna (Russian: Крапивна) is a rural locality (a selo) in Shchyokinsky District of Tula Oblast, Russia, located on the Plava River near its confluence with the Upa River. It has about 2,500 inhabitants.

The town of Kropivna was first documented in the 1389 testament of Dmitry Donskoy and remained the seat of an uyezd until the October Revolution. It was relocated several times, sacked by Ivan Zarutsky in 1613, and occupied by other rebels during the Time of Troubles. Places of interest include the ruins of the Trinity Monastery and an Orthodox cathedral dating from the mid-18th century.
