= 90th Guards Tank Division (1985–1997) =

Armored division of the Soviet Army

82nd Rifle Division 82nd Motorized Rifle Division 3rd Guards Motorized Rifle Division 6th Guards Mechanized Corps 6th Guards Mechanized Division 6th Guards Motor Rifle Division 90th Guards Tank Division
- Guards insignia
- Active: 1932–2001
- Country: Soviet Union
- Branch: Red Army, Soviet Army
- Type: Infantry, Armour
- Size: division
- Garrison/HQ: (final) Chernorech'e
- Engagements: Operation Mars; Operation Kutuzov; Battle of Berlin

The 90th Guards Tank Division was a division of the Soviet Army, and then of the Russian Ground Forces.

== Interwar period ==
The division traced its history back to the formation of the 82nd Territorial Rifle Division in 1932 from personnel of the 57th Rifle Division's 169th Rifle Regiment, which had relocated to the Transbaikal region. Formed in the Perm area, the 82nd relocated to the Ural Military District in May 1935. In May 1939, the 82nd Rifle was mobilized and sent to the Transbaikal. From July, it fought in the Battles of Khalkhin Gol against Japanese troops. After the end of the fighting, the 82nd was stationed at Bayantümen. For their actions, the 601st Rifle and 82nd Artillery Regiments of the division were awarded the Order of the Red Banner on 17 November.

By a directive of the People's Commissariat of Defense of 15 January 1940, the division was converted into the 82nd Motor Rifle Division with 12,000 men. Its 82nd Red Banner Artillery Regiment was formed from the 82nd Red Banner Howitzer Artillery Regiment and the 82nd Light Artillery Regiment. It included the 210th, 289th, and 601st Motor Rifle Regiments in addition to the artillery regiment. Then-Colonel Ivan Fedyuninsky commanded the division before the war. On 1 November 1940, the division included 11,755 men and 240 BT tanks. In March 1941, the 82nd was converted into the 82nd Motorized Division, joining the 29th Mechanized Corps. It included the 210th and 601st Motorized Regiments as well as the 123rd Tank and 82nd Artillery Regiments. However, this assignment proved to be brief, as the corps disbanded in May and the division became a separate unit of the 17th Army. On 1 June, it included 200 BT and T-26 tanks and seventeen T-37, T-38, and T-40 amphibious tanks for a total of 217 tanks.

== World War II ==
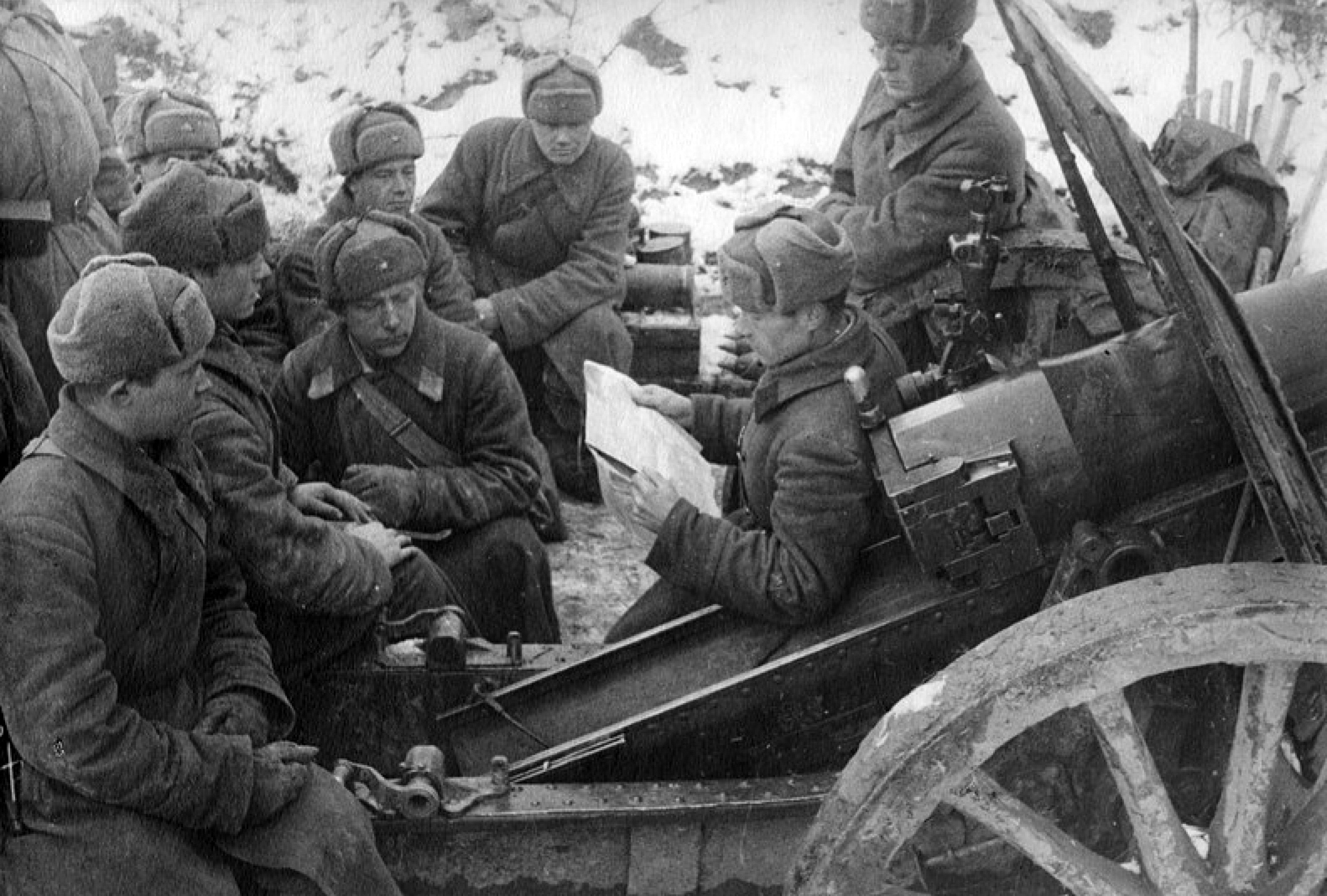
Politruk Panteleymon Afanasyevich Bykov reads the text of Stalin's speech of 6 November 1941, which ended with the words "Our cause is just, victory will be ours!," to Lieutenant Aleksandr Zhibrov's assembled howitzer battery of the division's 82nd Artillery Regiment, November 1941

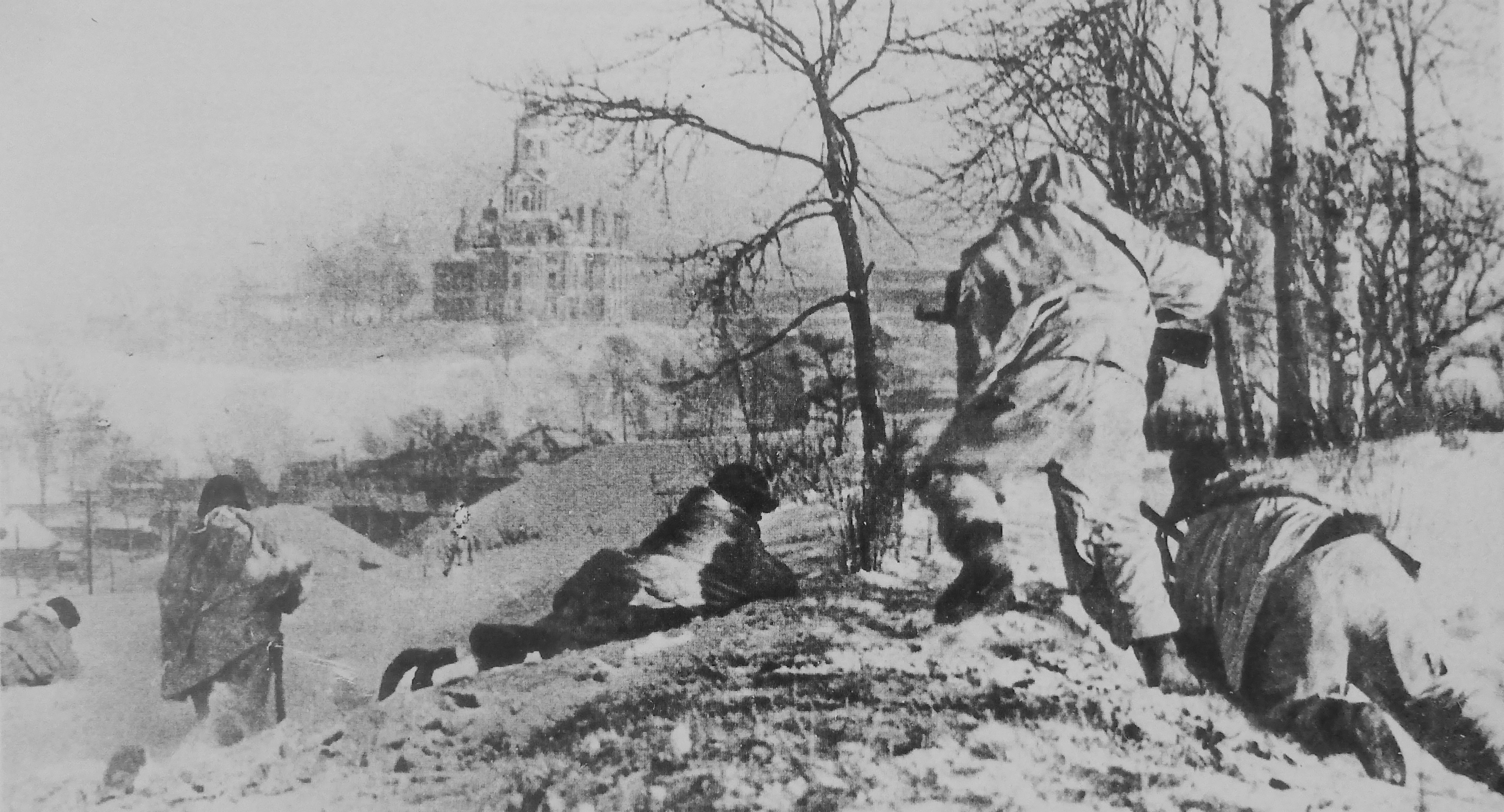
Soldiers of the 601st Rifle Regiment of the 82nd Motor Rifle Division attacking on the outskirts of Mozhaysk, January 1942

In July and August, the division was reorganized into the 82nd Motor Rifle Division again. Its 123rd Tank Regiment was used to form the 111th Tank Division, leaving the 82nd with the 210th, 250th, and 601st Motor Rifle Regiments and the 82nd Artillery Regiment. As a result of German advances following the beginning of their invasion of the Soviet Union, Operation Barbarossa, on 22 June, the 82nd was sent to the Western Front in October. It departed the Far East on 7 October and arrived at the front on 25 October. It was reinforced with the 27th Separate Tank Battalion, and fought in the Battle of Moscow as part of the 5th Army. The 82nd fought in fighting at Dorokhovo and in the capture of Mozhaysk. For its actions, the division was made an elite Guards unit, the 3rd Guards Motor Rifle Division, on 17 March 1942, and received the Order of the Red Banner.

It took part in the summer battles of 1942 with the Western Front and the failed Operation Mars in November/December 1942. After moving back into Stavka Reserves in June 1943, it was reorganized into the 6th Guards Mechanized Corps on 28 June 1943, being merged with the 49th Mechanised Brigade. The new corps included the 17th Guards Mechanised Brigade.

The new Corps, under the command of Lieutenant General Alexander Akimov, became part of the 4th Tank Army under Lieutenant General Vasily Badanov. Its first action was at Orel, the counterattack (Operation Kutuzov) on the northern side of the Kursk bulge after the German defeat at the Battle of Kursk proper. John Erickson writes that '..at 1100 on 26 July, two of Badanov's corps (11th Tank and 6th Guards Mechanised) put in a ragged attack towards Bolkhov. For the next few hours, under the very gaze of Bagramyan [commander of 11th Guards Army, whose sector 4th Tank was attacking through] and Badanov, both corps were heavily battered by the concealed German tanks and assault guns.' For the remainder of 1943, it was in reserve. It took part in the winter battles in Ukraine in 1944 (Proskurov-Chernovitsy), then the Lvov-Sandomierz Operation in the summer. It then participated in the Lower Silesia, Upper Silesia, Berlin, and Prague operations. In August 1944 it was given the honorific 'Lvov' for its part in the liberation of that city.

== Cold War ==
The Corps then became the 6th Guards Mechanised Division (1945–57) and then 6th Guards Motor Rifle Division (17 May 1957 – 1982, GSFG). The division was based at Bernau and was part of the 20th Guards Army. In May 1958, the division was reorganized. The 930th Guards Artillery Regiment moved to the 11th Guards Motor Rifle Division and was replaced by the 400th Artillery Regiment. The 1106th Guards Anti-Aircraft Artillery Regiment and 22nd Separate Guards Sapper Battalion were also transferred to the 11th Guards and replaced by that division's 288th Guards Anti-Aircraft Artillery Regiment and 122nd Separate Guards Sapper Battalion. The 351st Separate Missile Battalion was activated in 1961. On 19 February 1962, the 32nd Separate Equipment Maintenance and Recovery Battalion was activated. In May, the 10th Separate Tank Battalion was formed. The 122nd Separate Guards Sapper Battalion became an engineer-sapper battalion in 1968 and the 465th Separate Anti-Tank Artillery Battalion was activated. The chemical defence company became the 120th Separate Chemical Defence Battalion in 1972. The 686th Separate Motor Transport Battalion became the 1122nd Separate Material Supply Battalion in 1980.

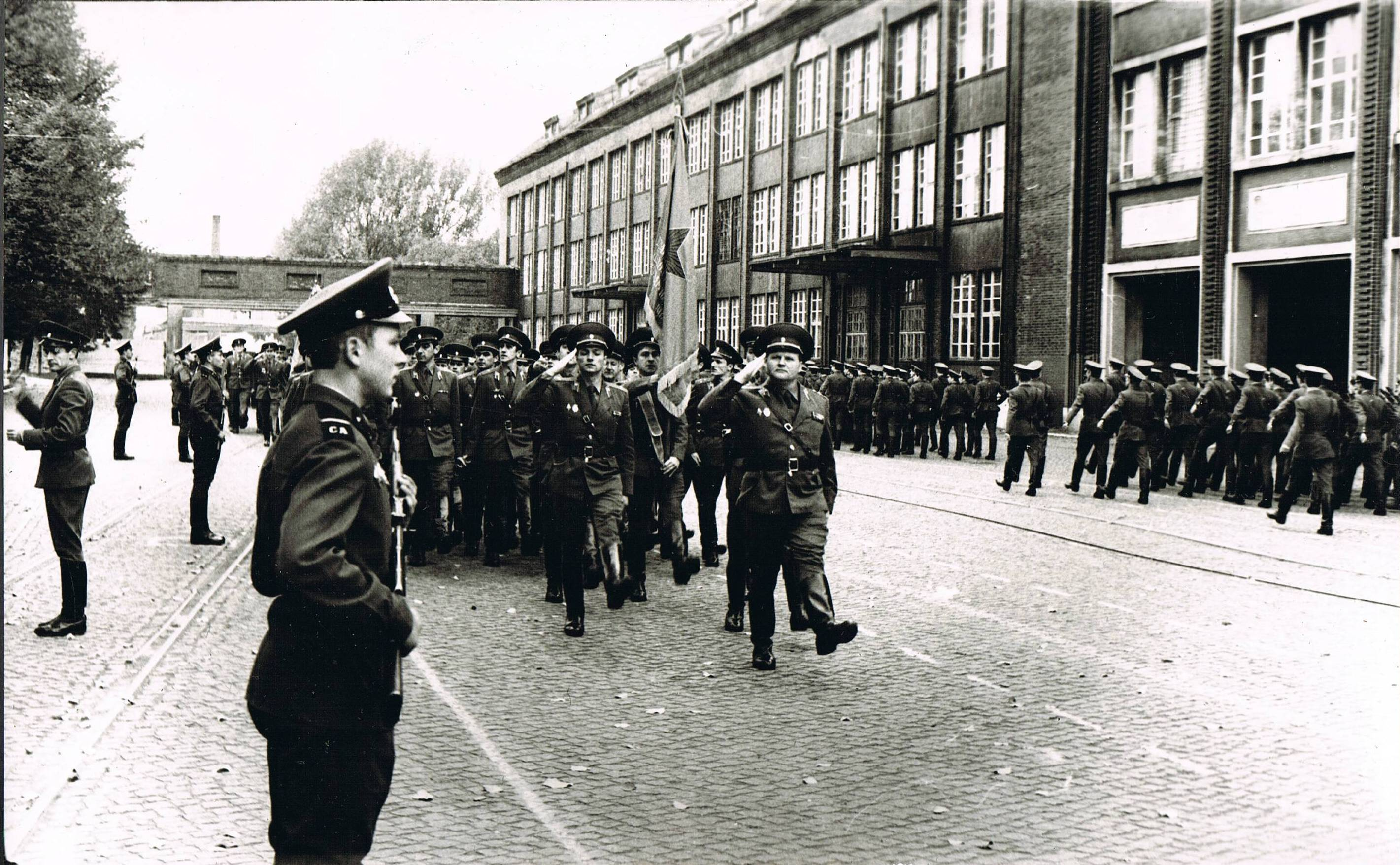
Troops of the 6th Guards Motor Rifle Division on parade in Bernau, 1985

On 8 February 1985, the 6th Guards Motor Rifle Division became the 90th Guards Tank Division. A new 6th Guards Motor Rifle Division was formed from the previous 90th Guards Tank Division in Poland. The new 90th Guards Tank Division's 16th Guards Motor Rifle Regiment became the 6th Guards Tank Regiment. Its 82nd Guards Motor Rifle Regiment was transferred to the new 6th Guards in Poland and replaced by that division's 215th Guards Tank Regiment. The 10th Separate Tank Battalion was disbanded, and the 465th Separate Anti-Tank Artillery Battalion transferred to the new 6th Guards. On 28 August 1988, the 351st Separate Missile Battalion was transferred to the 464th Missile Brigade. On 1 July 1989, the 215th Guards Tank Regiment was moved to the 25th Tank Division and replaced by that division's 803rd Motor Rifle Regiment.

During its last years in Germany the Division consisted of the 6th and 68th Guards Tank Regiments, the 81st Guards Motor Rifle Regiment, and the 803rd Motor Rifle Regiment . Also part of the Division were the 400th SP Artillery Regiment, the 288th Air defence Missile Regiment, and smaller supporting units. In January 1991, the 803rd Motor Rifle Regiment transferred back to the Soviet Union and was replaced by the 35th Motor Rifle Division's 69th Motor Rifle Regiment. The division became part of the 2nd Guards Tank Army in May.

== Russian service ==
In August 1992, the division moved to Chernorechye (now Roshchinsky) in Samara Oblast, becoming part of the Volga Military District, declining to a very low strength. In 1993, the 69th Motor Rifle Regiment became the 169th Tank Regiment. Between December 1993 and May 1998, the division was part of the 2nd Guards Army. Between 14 December 1994 and 9 April 1995 the 81st Guards Motor Rifle Regiment fought in the First Chechen War.

In December 1997 (or on September 1, 1997), the division became the 5968th Guards Weapons and Equipment Storage Base (Tank Troops) (5968-ю гв. Базу хранения вооружения и техники (танковых войск)). The 68th Guards Tank Regiment became the 2nd department for storing weapons and equipment (tank troops) (without the rank of “Guards”, without banners and orders for them). The 81st Guards Motor Rifle Regiment was sent to the 27th Guards Motor Rifle Division.

A Russian media report on 14 July 2001 said the 5968th Base was to be broken up to reinforce the 27th Motor Rifle Division and other units. The base disbanded in 2005.

Its final division honorifics were: Lvov, Order of the Red Banner, Order of Lenin, Order of Suvorov (Russian: Львовская краснознаменная, орденов Ленина, Суворова).

== Regiments, 1980s ==
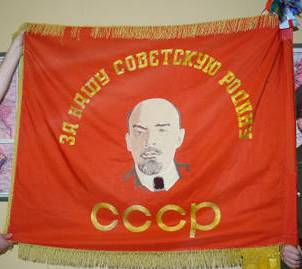
Reverse of banner of the 68th Guards Tank Regiment, Central Museum of the Armed Forces, Moscow.

Source: https://web.archive.org/web/20110516125726/http://orbat.com/phpBB2/viewtopic.php?=&p=57

- 6th Guards "Lvovskiy" order of Lenin Red Banner orders of Suvorov, Kutuzov and Bogdan Khmelnitskiy Tank Regiment
- 68th Guards "Zhitomirsko-Berlinskiy" Red Banner orders of Suvorov, Kutuzov, Bogdan Khmelnitskiy and Aleksandr Nevskiy Tank Regiment
- 81st Guards "Petrokovskiy" twice Red Banner orders of Suvorov, Kutuzov and Bogdan Khmelnitskiy Tank Regiment
- 803rd Motorized Rifle Regiment (1989 from the 25th Tank Division; replaced the 215th Guards "Kamenesk-Podolskiy" Guards Tank Regiment
- 400th "Transilvanskiy" Red Banner order of Bogdan Khmelnitskiy Motorized Artillery Regiment
- 288th Guards Anti-Aircraft Missile Regiment (originally directly subordinated to the 1st Ukrainian Front)
- 339th Mechanized regiment (Originally deployed at the Saratov district )

== Commanders ==
The following commanded the division:

- Kombrig Fedot Fyodorovich Pos (July–August 1939)
- Major Vasily Mikhailovich Alekseyev (August 1939–February 1940)
- Colonel Ivan Fedyuninsky (29 February–28 November 1940)
- Colonel Georgy Karamyshev (November 1940–10 January 1942)
- Major General Nikolay Ivanovich Orlov (11 January–10 February 1942)
- Major General Aleksandr Akimov (11 February 1942–6 December 1944, promoted lieutenant general 15 December 1943)
- Colonel Vasily Fyodorovich Orlov (7 December 1944–18 March 1945)
- Colonel Vasily Ignatyevich Koretsky (19 March–30 April 1945)
- Colonel Sergey Filippovich Pushkaryov (30 April 1945–31 August 1948, MG 27 June 1945)
- Colonel Yevgraf Andreyevich Novikov (31 August 1948–24 February 1950)
- Colonel Roman Yevdokimovich Mikhaylov (24 February 1950–5 May 1953)
- Colonel Kirill Stepanovich Udovichenko (5 May 1953–18 May 1955, MG 31 May 1954)
- Colonel Konstantin Rodionovich Moskvin (18 May 1955–10 August 1960, MG 27 August 1957)
- Colonel Vasily Bachilo (10 August 1960–3 April 1963, MG 27 April 1962)
- Colonel Georgy Ivanovich Pisarev (3 April 1963–5 July 1968, MG 16 June 1965)
- Colonel Vasily Aleksandrovich Makartsev (August 1968–11 December 1971, MG 29 April 1970)
- Colonel Anatoly Dmitrievich Fomin (11 December 1971–September 1974, MG 15 December 1972)
- Colonel Mikhail Mikhailovich Sotskov (September 1974–September 1975, MG 25 April 1975)
- Colonel Ilya Veldzhanov (September 1975–1978)
- Colonel Nikolay Madudov (1979–1981)
- Colonel Beda (1981–1983)
- Colonel Aleksandr Anatolyevich Dorofeyev (9 May 1983–6 June 1985)
- Colonel Yury Yakubov (June 1985–January 1987)
- Colonel Nikolay Petrovich Gusev (January 1987–June 1989)
- Colonel Sergey Dokuchayev (1989–1991)
- Colonel Nikolay Dmitriyevich Suryadny (1991–1995)
