= Yefremovsky Uyezd =

Yefremovsky Uyezd (Ефремовский уезд) was one of the subdivisions of the Tula Governorate of the Russian Empire. It was situated in the southeastern part of the governorate. Its administrative centre was Yefremov.

== Demographics ==
At the time of the Russian Empire census of 1897, Yefremovsky Uyezd had a population of 171,081. Of these, 99.8% spoke Russian and 0.1% Yiddish as their native language.
