= 73rd Rifle Division =

- Active: 1st Formation; 2nd Formation; 3rd Formation Oct 1942 – 1993
- Country: Soviet Union
- Branch: Red Army (1942-1946); Soviet Army (1946-1991); Russian Ground Forces (1991-1993)
- Type: Infantry
- Engagements: Operation Kutuzov; Battle of the Dnieper; Gomel-Rechitsa Offensive; Operation Bagration; Bobruysk Offensive; East Prussian Offensive
- Battle honours: Order of the Red Banner; Order of Lenin; Order of Suvorov

The 73rd Rifle Division was a formation of the Great Patriotic War Soviet Army. The division began assigned to the 20th Army at the beginning of the war and was destroyed and rebuilt twice before the war ended.

According to research in the Soviet archives published by Michael Avanzini and Craig Crofoot, the division was formed five times from 1930 to the late 1940s. Its first formation was established at Omsk in the Siberian Military District in 1930, and reformed a second time in September 1939 after serving as the cadre for the 109th Rifle Division and the 194th Rifle Division. Disbanded for unknown reasons in October 1939.

== Third Formation ==
Established Omsk in Jul 1940. Assigned to the newly formed 20th Army formed in June 1941 in the Orel Military District, under the command of Colonel Alexander Akimov. Wiped out in October 1941 near Vyazma during the opening stages of the Battle of Moscow.

== Fourth Formation ==
Rebuilt in February 1942 at Ordzhonikidze, Ukraine. Destroyed sometime prior to October 1942.

== Fifth Formation ==
Formed on 15 October 1942 from the 122nd Rifle Brigade in the city of Livny, Orel Oblast.

In January–February 1943 the division participated in the Voronezh-Kastornoye and Maloarkhangelsk Offensive operations. In early April 1943 the division took up defensive positions on the right flank of the 48th Army.

On 20 July 1943 the division participated in the counteroffensive after the Battle of Kursk. The division participated in the Liberation of Novozybkov. By October 1943 the division was located southwest of Gomel. On 11 November 1943 the division participated in the Gomel-Rechitsa Offensive and by the end of the month was in defensive position 10 km south of Zhlobin. By the end of December 1943 the division had advanced to the right bank of the Berezina River south of Parichi and repelled enemy counterattacks.

The division spent the next several months in defensive positions south of Parichi.

On 23 June 1944 as part of Operation Bagration the division deployed to the western bank of the Berezina River and reached the approaches of Babruysk and later participated in the capture of the city. The division then advanced in the general direction of Warsaw.

In September 1944 the division was in the 2nd echelon of the 48th Army protecting the army's right flank during its advance. The division entered battle between the 217th Rifle Division and 399th Rifle Division, 42nd Rifle Corps and captured a bridgehead over the Narew River. The bridgehead was gradually expanded through October 1944.

From January 1945 until the end of the war, the division participated in the Mlawa-Elbing Offensive and ended the war on the Baltic Coast at Frisches Haff.

Gained the honorifics 'Novozybkov Order of Lenin Red Banner Order of Suvorov'.

Postwar, the 73rd Rifle Division was relocated to the Kuban Military District with the 29th Rifle Corps and was based at Novorossiysk. It became the 39th Rifle Brigade and was redesignated the 73rd Mountain Rifle Division on 23 July 1949. In 1954 it became a rifle division again. On 10 June 1957 it became the 73rd Motor Rifle Division. In June 1968 the division transferred to Komsomolsk-on-Amur and became part of the 15th Army. On 29 October 1989 it became the 5505th Weapons and Equipment Storage Base. The base was disbanded in 1993.

== Subordinate Units ==
- 3rd Formation
  - 392nd Rifle Regiment
  - 413th Rifle Regiment
  - 471st Rifle Regiment
  - 11th Artillery Regiment
  - 148th Separate Antitank Battalion

== Commanders ==
- Colonel Dimitri Ivanovich Smirnov (15 Oct 42 - 12 May 1943), from 18 May 1943 Major General
- Colonel Peter Spiridonov (12 Jun 1943 - 29 Jul 1943)
- Colonel Vasily Ivanovich Matronin (21 Jul 1944 - 2 Nov 1944)
- Colonel Ilya Pashkov (3 Nov 1944 - 9 May 1945) from 5 May 1945 Major General

== Notes ==
- Feskov, V.I.; Golikov, V.I.; Kalashnikov, K.A.; Slugin, S.A. (2013). Вооруженные силы СССР после Второй Мировой войны: от Красной Армии к Советской [The Armed Forces of the USSR after World War II: From the Red Army to the Soviet: Part 1 Land Forces] (in Russian). Tomsk: Scientific and Technical Literature Publishing. ISBN 9785895035306.
