= Krapivensky Uyezd =

Uyezd of Tula Governorate

Krapivensky Uyezd (Russian: Крапивенский уезд) was one of the subdivisions of the Tula Governorate of the Russian Empire. It was situated in the central part of the governorate. Its administrative center was Krapivna.

== Demographics ==
At the time of the Russian Empire Census of 1897, Krapivensky Uyezd had a population of 102,926. Of these, 99.8% spoke Russian as their native language. Its administrative center, Krapivna, had a population of 6,146.
