= Chernsky Uyezd =

Subdivision of the Tula Governorate of the Russian Empire

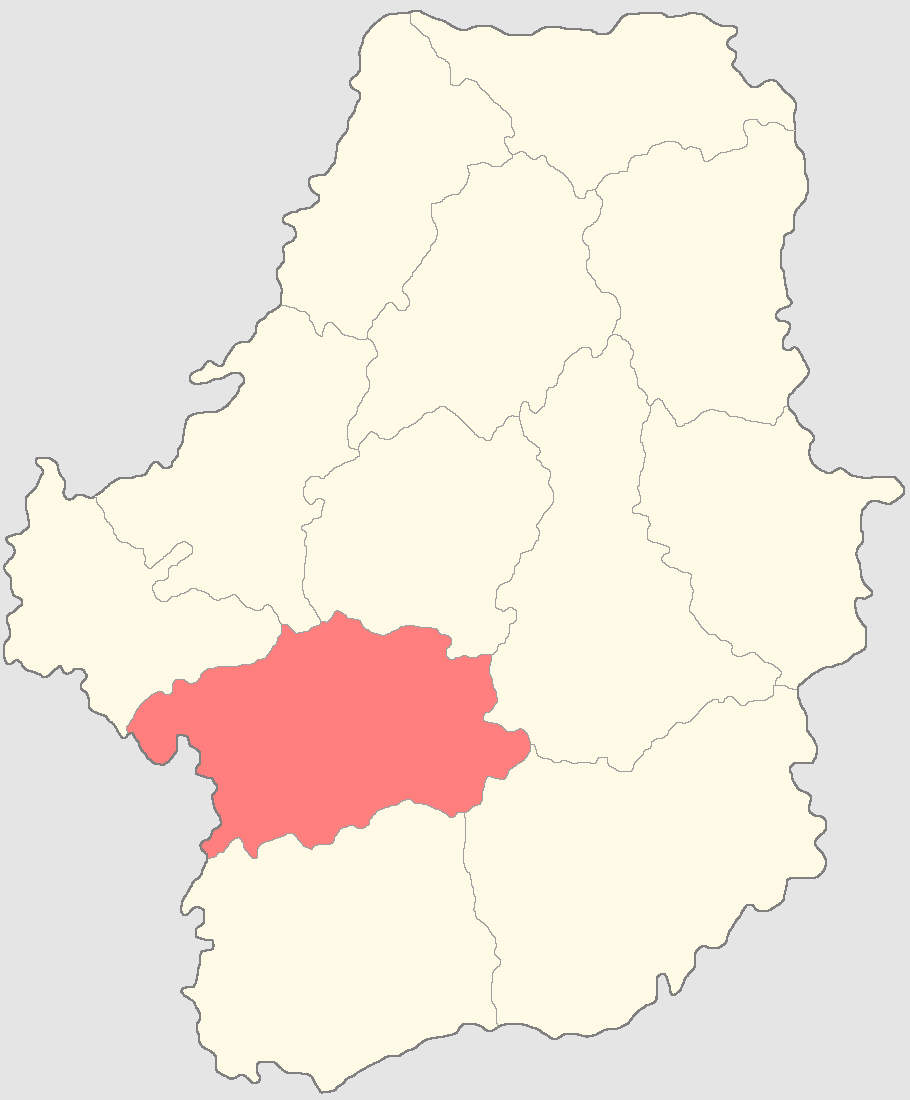
Map with Chernsky Uyezd marked as light red

Chernsky Uyezd (Че́рнский уе́зд) was one of the subdivisions of the Tula Governorate of the Russian Empire. It was situated in the southwestern part of the governorate. Its administrative centre was Chern.

== Demographics ==
At the time of the Russian Empire Census of 1897, Chernsky Uyezd had a population of 107,806. Of these, 99.8% spoke Russian as their native language.
