= Tulsky Uyezd =

Subdivision of the Tula Governorate of the Russian Empire

Tulsky Uyezd (Тульский уезд) was one of the subdivisions of the Tula Governorate of the Russian Empire. It was situated in the northern part of the governorate. Its administrative centre was Tula.

== Demographics ==
At the time of the Russian Empire Census of 1897, Tulsky Uyezd had a population of 211,059. Of these, 97.7% spoke Russian, 1.1% Yiddish, 0.5% Ukrainian, 0.3% Polish, 0.2% German and 0.1% Tatar as their native language.
