= Vasily Bachilo =

Soviet Army major general

Vasily Yakovlevich Bachilo
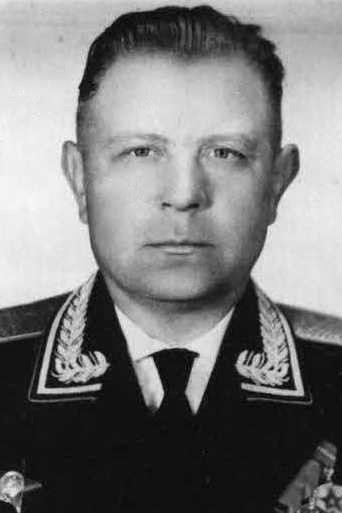
- Bachilo after his 1962 promotion to major general
- Born: 18 January 1918; Leshnitsa village (now in Pukhavichy District, Minsk Oblast)
- Died: 1 May 1989 (aged 71)
- Allegiance: Soviet Union
- Branch: Red Army (later Soviet Army)
- Service years: 1938–1973
- Rank: General-mayor
- Commands: 8th Guards Motor Rifle Division; 6th Guards Motor Rifle Division
- Conflicts: Battles of Khalkhin Gol; World War II
- Awards: Order of the Red Banner

Vasily Yakovlevich Bachilo (Russian: Василий Яковлевич Бачило; 18 January 1918 – 1 May 1989) was a Soviet Army major general who held divisional command during the Cold War.

Conscripted into the Red Army before World War II, Bachilo began the war as a platoon commander. Twice wounded during fighting on the Eastern Front, Bachilo was repeatedly decorated and rose to regimental command. Continuing his military service postwar, Bachilo commanded the 6th Guards Motor Rifle Division in East Germany during the early 1960s.

== Early life and prewar service ==
A Belarusian, Vasily Yakovlevich Bachilo was born on 18 January 1918 in the village of Leshnitsa, Perezhersky rural council, Rudensky District, Minsk Oblast. Before conscription into the Red Army on 13 October 1938, he worked as a technician for the repair of steam engines in Osipovichi. Bachilo was dispatched to Atkarsk to serve as a Red Army man in the Territorial Ski Rifle Regiment stationed there. After completing two months of training at the military district's school for corpsmen at Kazan in June 1939, Bachilo became commander of the sanitary department of the 42nd Separate Medical-Sanitary Battalion, part of the 36th Motor Rifle Division stationed at Ayolan-Sain in Mongolia. In this capacity he fought in the Battles of Khalkhin Gol. After the end of the fighting, Bachilo was selected for officer training and became a cadet of the Omsk Infantry School in October 1939. After graduation from the year-long course on 10 October 1940 as a junior lieutenant, Bachilo was posted as a platoon commander to the 266th Rifle Regiment of the 93rd Rifle Division, stationed at Chita in the Transbaikal Military District.

== World War II ==
After the German invasion of the Soviet Union began on 22 June 1941, Bachilo continued to serve with the division covering the Manchurian border. In July he was promoted to regimental adjutant. The division was rushed west for the Battle of Moscow and went into action on 26 October, counterattacking to stop the German advance towards Moscow along the Warsaw Highway at the Nara, on the approaches to Podolsk. Bachilo distinguished himself immediately and on 27 October was recommended for the Order of the Red Banner, which was awarded on 10 December. The recommendation read:

He displayed valor and himself personally guided the battalion into battle, and on the death of the battalion commander was appointed battalion commander...Five enemy attacks were heroically repulsed...In a trench, he personally stabbed to death six Fascists during the attack.

Bachilo became assistant chief of staff of the regiment on 4 November with a simultaneous promotion to senior lieutenant. In the fighting he was wounded on 14 November and evacuated to the rear, being treated at Evacuation Hospital No. 2981 in the village of Pokrovka, Orenburg Oblast. Discharged from the hospital on 14 March 1942 he arrived to the newly forming 152nd Rifle Brigade a week later. With the latter he took command of a battalion on 7 May. After the brigade was reorganized as the new 118th Rifle Division in June 1943, Bachilo was promoted to chief of staff of the 398th Rifle Regiment by 2 August. Ten days later, he took command of the division's 463rd Rifle Regiment. In recognition of Bachilo's performance during the Mius offensive and Donbas strategic offensive deputy commander Colonel Aleksey Zazhigalov recommended him for the Order of the Red Banner, which was awarded on 23 September. The recommendation read:

On 30 July 1943, durning the enemy's offensive on the height with two kurgans, Captain Bachilo, being chief of staff of the 398th Rifle Regiment, was directly in the combat formations of the regiment. organized the battle with superior enemy forces, and held the old positions. With these actions he ensued the transfer of the defense to new units.

On 27 August 1943 elements of the division dislodged the enemy from the strongly fortified line in the vicinity of Gulyanevka and Avilo-Fyodorovka, Rostov Oblast, and went into pursuit of the retreating enemy. A responsible combat objective was placed on Captain Bachilo: command of the motorized detachment for the pursuit of the enemy towards Novo-Maryevka, where the detachment entered combat. Under the detachment's energetic offensive actions the enemy retreated, suffering significant losses in personnel and equipment. Dozens of corpses of enemy soldiers and officers were left on the battlefield.

In the offensive operations for the capture of Hill 102.2, Captain Bachilo, as regimental commander, on 3 September 1943, ensued and secured fine results. Through skillful direction and close cooperation with attached artillery units, the regiment overcame strong enemy resistance, capturing the height and thus ensuing the division's further advance. During the repulse of the last two enemy counterattacks two tanks were knocked out, more than a company of enemy infantry was destroyed, and trophies taken.

He commanded the regiment during the Melitopol offensive, during which it took part in the liberation of Melitopol. Being wounded a second time on 5 October, Bachilo was recommended for the title Hero of the Soviet Union by division commander Colonel Fyodor Dobrovolsky on 27 October, but this was downgraded to the Order of Suvorov, 3rd class, awarded on 9 December. The recommendation read:

Before the entry into command of Major Bachilo the 463rd Rifle Regiment did not distinguish itself in combat operations by comparison with the other regiments. Taking command of the regiment Major Bachilo made the regiment leading in all offensive actions of the division.

During the period of the breakthrough of strong fortified enemy defenses from 30 September to 17 October 1943 the regiment of Major Bachilo was located on the main axis of advance. Under his leadership the regiment was the first to force a crossing of the Molochnaya river and barely passable swamps, and with a rapid onslaught, breaking the determined resistance of the enemy, took the anti-tank ditch, holding under strong artillery, mortar, and machine gun fire, and also under systematic mass airstrikes of enemy ground attack aircraft.

Developing the success, his regiment was the first to burst onto Hill 30, from which the enemy observed the terrain below, and held it under strong fire. The enemy launched seven to eight counterattacks that day, but the regiment under the command of Major Bachilo repulsed all counterattacks of the enemy, inflicting heavy losses, and pursuing on his heels reached a line a hundred meters east of the railway connecting Melitopol with Crimea. During this period Major Bachilo's regiment destroyed more than 900 enemy soldiers and officers and captured thirty. 30 machine guns, eight mortars, seven field guns, six vehicles, and three tanks were destroyed, and fifteen machine guns, two mortars, a field gun, 104 rifles and other weapons were captured.

On 9 October Major Bachilo fell strongly ill, but did not leave his combat post and commanded the regiment from a stretcher. He was evacuated to the medical-sanitary battalion only after the arrival of his deputy.

Bachilo was evacuated to a hospital in Novocherkassk in January 1944. Bachilo returned to the 118th upon recovery in February, serving as acting commander of its 527th Rifle Regiment. He completed the Vystrel course between April and October 1944. Returning to the front, he was posted to the 26th Guards Rifle Division as chief of staff of its 79th Guards Rifle Regiment. In January 1945 Bachilo and his division fought in the East Prussian offensive. In recognition of Bachilo's performance in the latter, regimental commander Lieutenant Colonel Sergey Shelkovy recommended him for the Order of the Patriotic War on 25 January, which was awarded on 24 February. The recommendation read:

During his service with the regiment Comrade V. Ya. Bachilo proved himself to be honorable, disciplined, demanding to himself and to subordinates, and well acquainted with staff work.

During the period of offensive battles, Comrade V. Ya. Bachilo finely organized the work of the staff as a whole, and every section individually. Thanks to the carefully arranged scheme of coordination of the regiment and attached units worked out by the regimental staff under the leadership of Comrade V. Ya. Bachilo, the regimental commander successfully directed the battle.

During the offensive on the town of Aulowoenen on 20 January 1945, Comrade V. Ya. Bachilo personally coordinated the operations of rifle battalions and attached engineering units and thanks to the well developed plan of the offensive, the town was taken.

The exact work of reconnaissance, signals and sapper units ensued the rapid progress of the regiment and fulfillment of the objectives.

Personal bravery, courage, knowledge of his work, loyalty to the cause of the Party of Lenin and Stalin, are the distinguishing characteristics of Guards Major Bachilo.

For courage, valor, and skillful leadership of combat operations, displayed in battle with the German invaders, Comrade V. Ya. Bachilo is worthy of the award of the Order of the Patriotic War, 1st class.

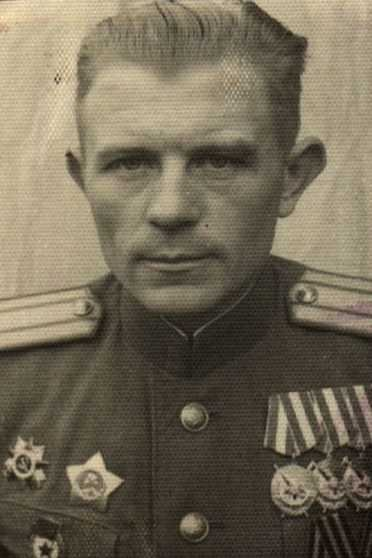
Bachilo, 1945

The regiment went on to fight in the Battle of Königsberg in April. In recognition of Bachilo's performance, Shelkovy recommended him for the Order of the Red Banner on 7 April, which was awarded eight days later. The recommendation read:

During the offensive on Koenigsberg, on 6 April 1945, Comrade V. Ya. Bachilo personally coordinated the operations of the rifle battalions and attached engineering units and thanks to the well developed plan of the offensive, the enemy defense was broken through in all sectors of the offensive of the regiment. For courage, valor, and skillful leadership of combat operations, displayed in battle with the German invaders, Comrade V. Ya. Bachilo is worthy of the award of the Order of the Red Banner.

== Postwar ==
Shortly after the end of the war, Bachilo was transferred to serve as chief of staff of the 33rd Guards Rifle Regiment of the 11th Guards Rifle Division. In October he was promoted to chief of the division operations section while it was stationed at Palminkhen, East Prussia in the Special Military District. From 30 August 1946 Bachilo served in Kaliningrad as chief of staff of the 169th Guards Rifle Regiment of the 1st Guards Rifle Division. He was selected for further officer training at the Frunze Military Academy, entering in October 1950. Upon graduation in October 1953, Bachilo was appointed commander of the 331st Rifle Regiment of the 96th Rifle Division. After completing the yearlong Higher Academic Courses at the Frunze Military Academy in November 1956, he was appointed chief of staff of the 3rd Guards Rifle Division of the Baltic Military District. Bachilo continued in this post after the division was converted to a motor rifle division in June 1957 and in October of that year became division deputy commander. He took command of the 8th Guards Motor Rifle Division on 19 May 1959, but his command was disbanded during conventional force reductions in May 1960. Bachilo transferred to command the 6th Guards Motor Rifle Division of the Group of Soviet Forces in Germany on 10 August of that year. Promoted to general-mayor on 27 April 1962, he was appointed first deputy chief of the Combat Training Directorate of the Group of Soviet Forces in Germany on 3 April 1963. In September 1966 Bachilo returned to the Baltic Military District as chief of its Civil Defense Department and district deputy commander for civil defense, holding this post until his retirement on 23 November 1973. Bachilo died on 1 May 1989.

== Awards ==
- Order of the Red Banner (8 December 1941, 23 September 1943, 15 April 1945)
- Order of Suvorov, 3rd class (9 December 1943)
- Order of the Patriotic War, 1st class (24 February 1945, 6 April 1985)

== Dates of rank ==
- Junior Lieutenant (8 October 1940)
- Senior Lieutenant (4 November 1941)
- Captain (22 February 1943)
- Major (28 September 1943)
- Lieutenant Colonel (28 February 1948)
- Colonel (30 October 1953)
- General-mayor (27 April 1962)
