= Venyovsky District =

Venyovsky District Венёвский район (Russian)
- District
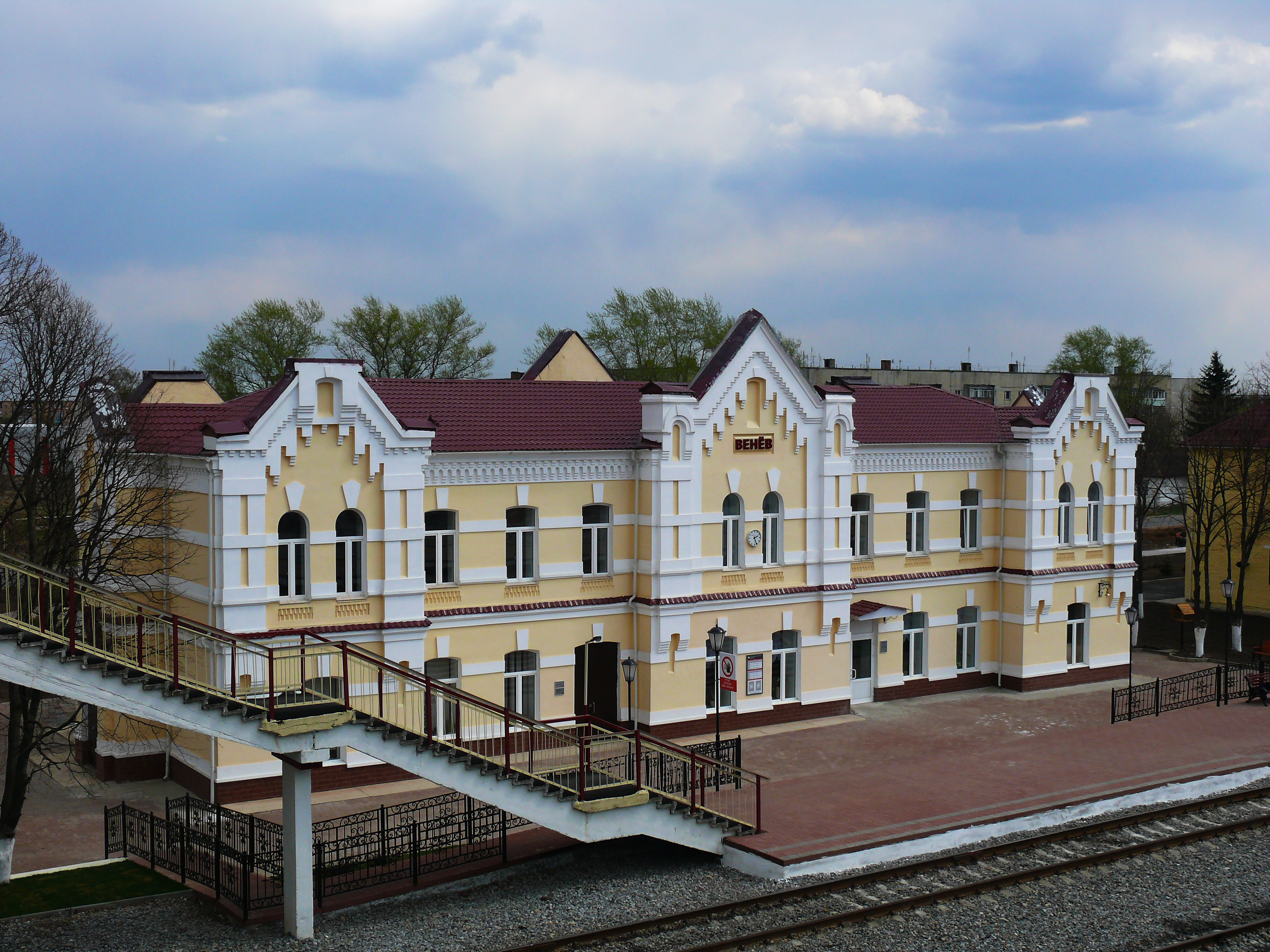
- Railway Station, Venyov, Venyovsky District

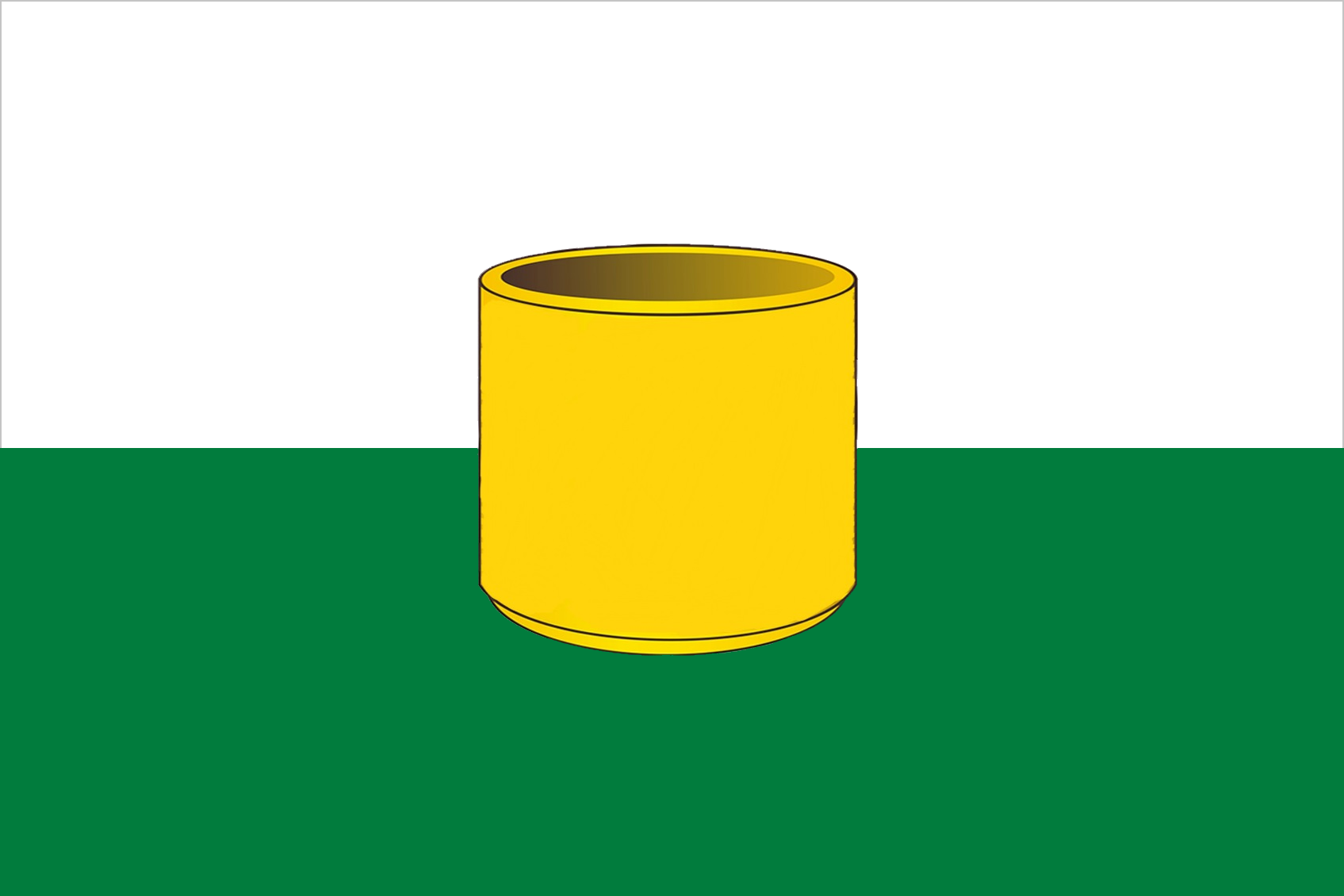
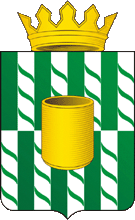
- Flag Coat of arms
- Location of Venyovsky District in Tula Oblast
- Coordinates: 54°21′N 38°16′E
- Country: Russia
- Federal subject: Tula Oblast
- Established: 20 June 1924
- Administrative center: Venyov

Area
  - Total: 1,620 km^{2} (630 sq mi)

Population (2010 Census)
  - Total: 33,940
  - Density: 21.0/km^{2} (54.3/sq mi)
  - Urban: 63.1%
  - Rural: 36.9%

Administrative structure
  - Administrative divisions: 1 Towns under district jurisdiction, 1 Urban-type settlements, 19 Rural okrugs
  - Inhabited localities: 1 cities/towns, 1 urban-type settlements, 206 rural localities

Municipal structure
  - Municipally incorporated as: Venyovsky Municipal District
  - Municipal divisions: 2 urban settlements, 4 rural settlements
- Time zone: UTC+3 (MSK)
- OKTMO ID: 70612000
- Website: http://venev71.ru/

Venyovsky District (Russian: Венёвский райо́н) is an administrative district (raion), one of the twenty-three in Tula Oblast, Russia. Within the framework of municipal divisions, it is incorporated as Venyovsky Municipal District. It is located in the northeast of the oblast. The area of the district is 1,620 square kilometers (630 sq mi). Its administrative center is the town of Venyov. Population: 33,940 (2010 Census); 37,612 (2002 census); 38,527 (1989 Soviet census). The population of Venyov accounts for 44.9% of the district's total population.
