= Plavë (river) =

River in Kosovo and Albania

The Plavë, also known as Zapllugha or Orgjost Creek, is a river flowing through the municipality of Dragash, Kosovo, and in parts of Albania. The Plava originates at an altitude of 1,400 m on the slopes of Black Peak in the Sharr Mountains, and it flows for 21 km. The river collects around 40 streams flowing from the regions of Opolje and Gora, among the most famous of these being the Brod River and the Restelica River. Both farmland and native vegetation surround its banks in a densely populated basin at 58 inhabitants per km^{2}. A Mediterranean climate prevails with an average temperature of 6°C, ranging from an average of 19°C in July down to an average of -7°C in January; the average annual rainfall is 1,160 mm, ranging from a 133 mm average in the wettest month of November to the 34 mm average in the driest month of August.
