= Bogoroditsky Uyezd =

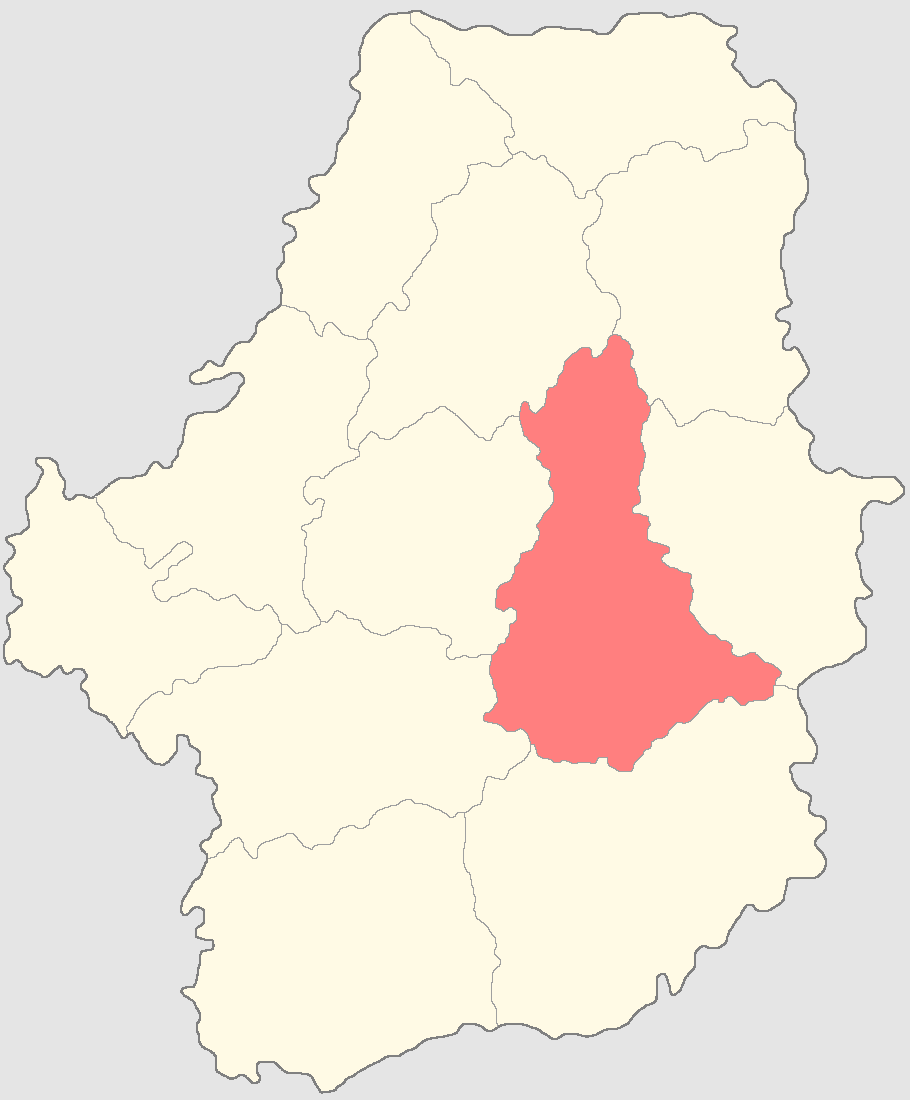

Bogoroditsky Uyezd (Богородицкий уезд) was one of the subdivisions of the Tula Governorate of the Russian Empire. It was situated in the central part of the governorate. Its administrative centre was Bogoroditsk.

== Demographics ==
At the time of the Russian Empire Census of 1897, Bogoroditsky Uyezd had a population of 155,403. Of these, 99.8% spoke Russian, 0.1% Polish and 0.1% Yiddish as their native language.
