= Odoyevsky Uyezd =

Odoyevsky Uyezd (Одоевский уезд) was one of the subdivisions of the Tula Governorate of the Russian Empire. It was situated in the western part of the governorate. Its administrative centre was Odoyev.

== Demographics ==
At the time of the Russian Empire Census of 1897, Odoyevsky Uyezd had a population of 91,166. Of these, 99.9% spoke Russian as their native language.
