= Aleksinsky Uyezd =

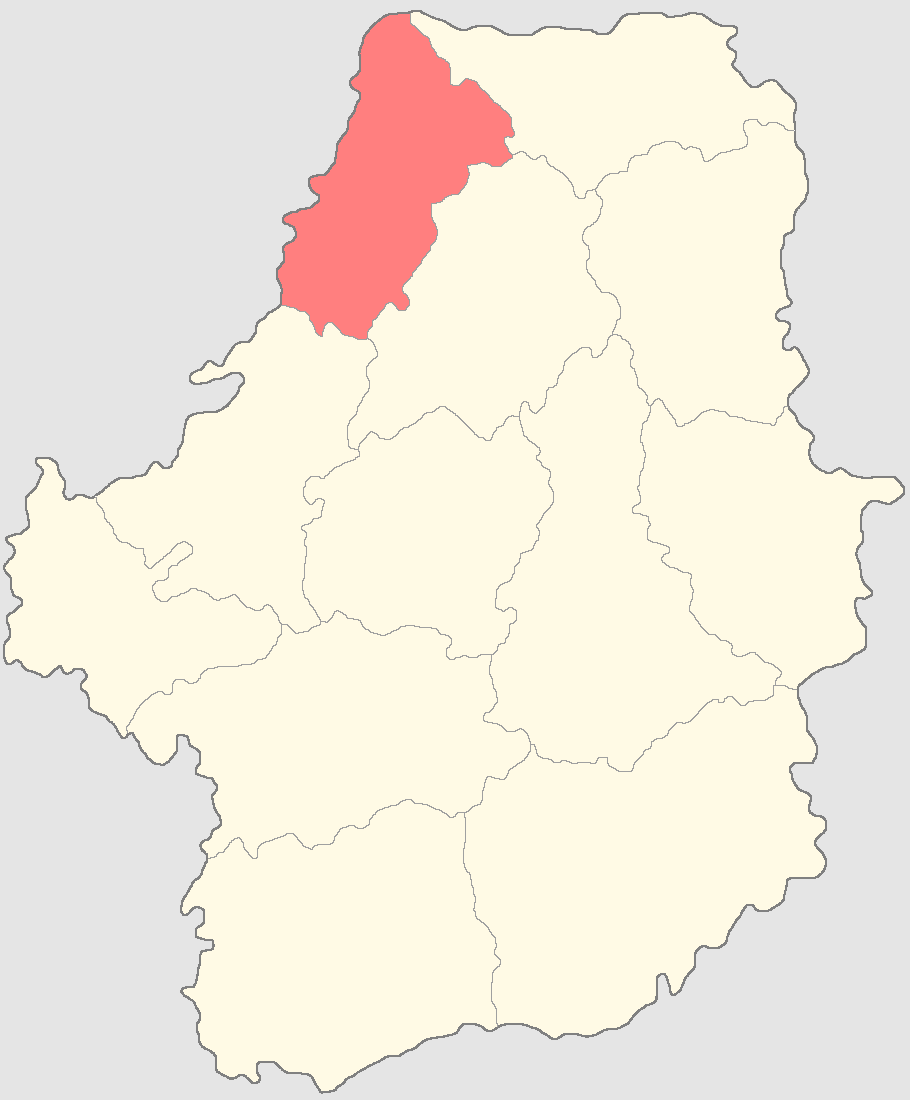
Map of subdivision

Aleksinsky Uyezd (Алексинский уезд) was one of the subdivisions of the Tula Governorate of the Russian Empire. It was situated in the northwestern part of the governorate. Its administrative centre was Aleksin.

== Demographics ==
At the time of the Russian Empire Census of 1897, Aleksinsky Uyezd had a population of 73,001. Of these, 99.8% spoke Russian and 0.1% Yiddish as their native language.
