= Upa (river) =

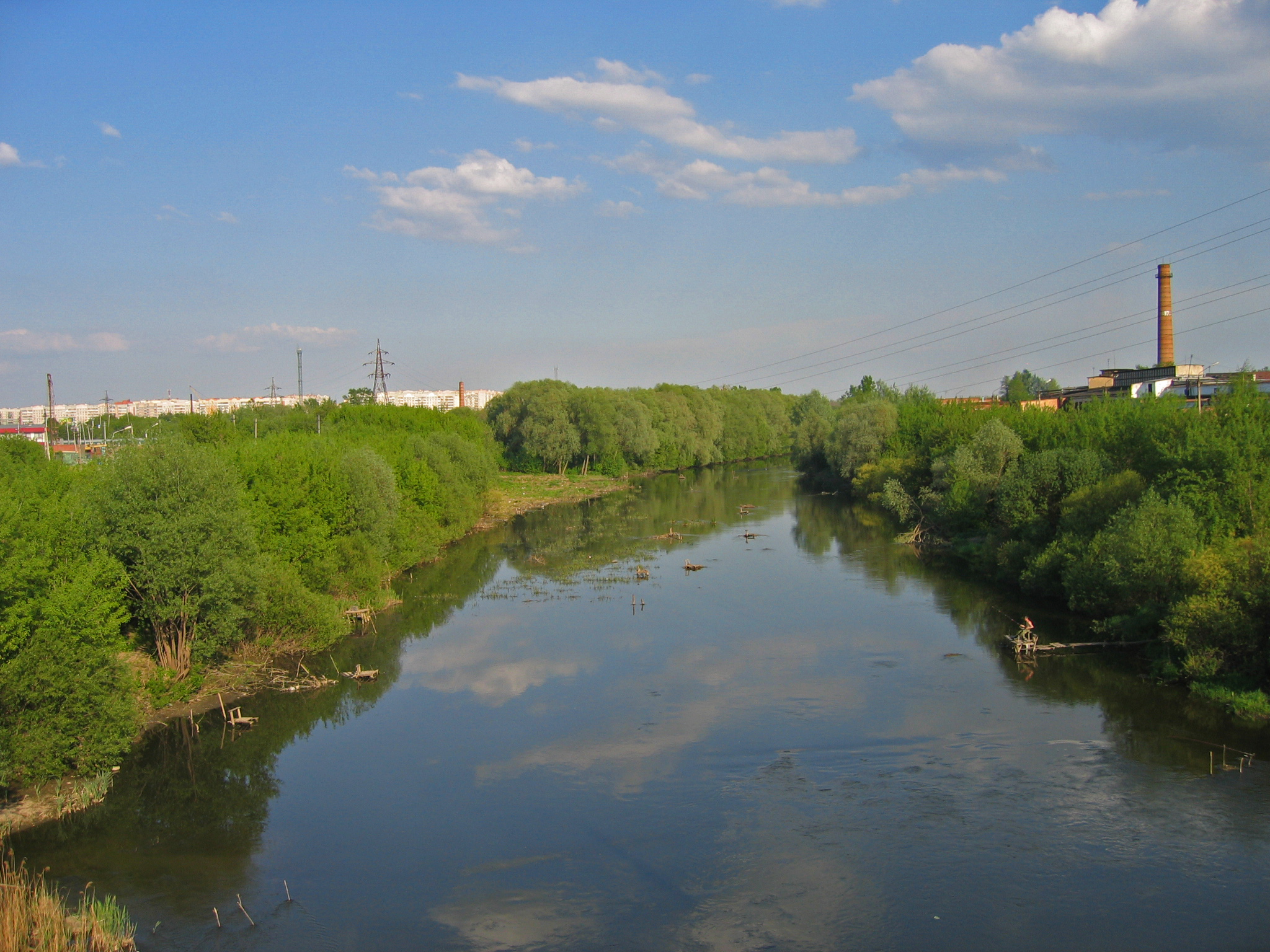
- Upa river in Tula
- Native name: Упа (Russian)

Location
- Country: Russia

Physical characteristics
- Mouth: Oka
  - coordinates: 54°02′07″N 36°20′03″E
- Length: 345 km (214 mi)
- Basin size: 9,510 km^{2} (3,670 sq mi)

Basin features
- Progression: Oka→ Volga→ Caspian Sea
- Tributaries
  - right: Plava

The Upa (Russian: Упа́, Russian pronunciation: [ʊˈpa]) is a river in Tula Oblast, Russia, and one of the main tributaries of the Oka.

The river is 345 kilometres (214 mi) long, and has a drainage basin of 9,510 square kilometres (3,670 sq mi). The city of Tula is situated on its banks. The name of the river is of Baltic origin. This is probably one of the oldest baltic hydronims. Lithuanian word "upė", latvian word "upe" in English means "river", in russian means "река";
