= Chernsky District =

Chernsky District Чернский район (Russian)
- District
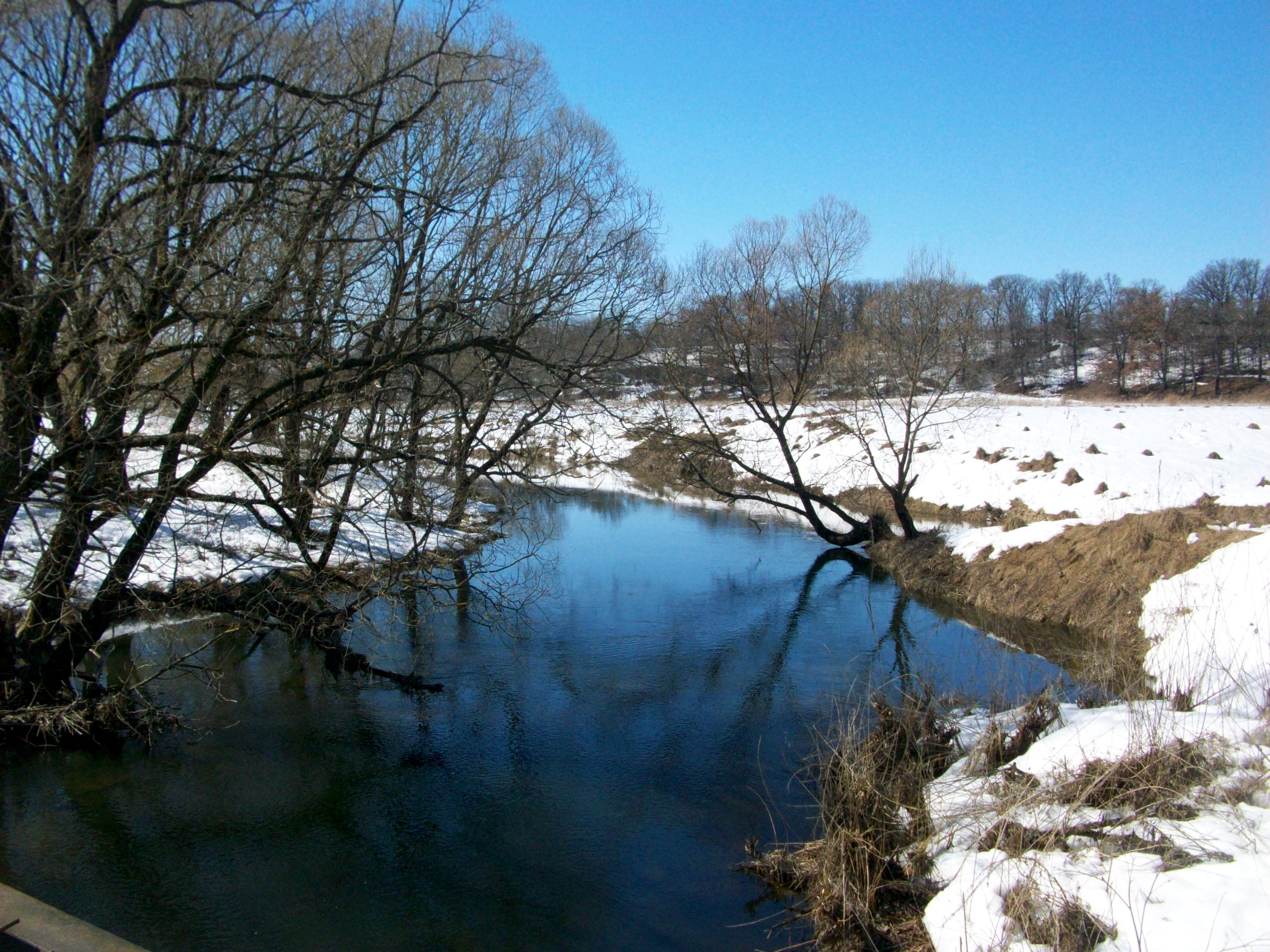
- Bezhin Meadow, Chernsky District

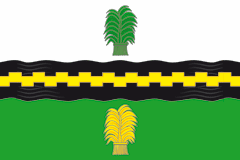
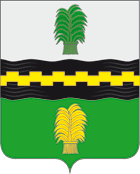
- Flag Coat of arms
- Location of Chernsky District in Tula Oblast
- Coordinates: 53°27′00″N 36°54′36″E
- Country: Russia
- Federal subject: Tula Oblast
- Established: 15 July 1924
- Administrative center: Chern

Area
  - Total: 1,614 km^{2} (623 sq mi)

Population (2010 Census)
  - Total: 20,476
  - Density: 12.69/km^{2} (32.86/sq mi)
  - Urban: 36.8%
  - Rural: 63.2%

Administrative structure
  - Administrative divisions: 2 Urban-type settlements, 24 Rural administrations
  - Inhabited localities: 2 urban-type settlements, 266 rural localities

Municipal structure
  - Municipally incorporated as: Chernsky Municipal District
  - Municipal divisions: 2 urban settlements, 6 rural settlements
- Time zone: UTC+3 (MSK)
- OKTMO ID: 70646000
- Website: https://chern.tularegion.ru/

Chernsky District (Russian: Че́рнский райо́н) is an administrative district (raion), one of the twenty-three in Tula Oblast, Russia. As a municipal division, it is incorporated as Chernsky Municipal District. It is located in the southwest of the oblast. The area of the district is 1,614 square kilometers (623 sq mi). Its administrative center is the urban locality (a work settlement) of Chern. Population: 20,476 (2010 Census); 23,006 (2002 census); 22,605 (1989 Soviet census). The population of Chern accounts for 31.3% of the district's total population.
