= Tula Governorate =

1796–1929 unit of Russia

Coordinates: 54.2000°N 37.6167°E

Tula Governorate Тульская губерния
- Governorate of Russian Empire (1796–1917), Russian Republic, and RSFSR (1917–1929)
- 1796–1929
- Coat of arms

- Location in the Russian Empire
- Capital: Tula
- Area
- 30,960.3 km^{2} (11,953.8 sq mi)
- Population
  - 1897: 1,419,456
- History
  - Established: 1796
  - Disestablished: 1929
Preceded by	Succeeded by
Tula Viceroyalty	Central Industrial Oblast

Tula Governorate (Russian: Тульская губерния, romanized: Tul'skaya guberniya) was an administrative-territorial unit (guberniya) of the Russian Empire and the Russian SFSR. The governate existed from 1796 to 1929; its seat was in the city of Tula. It was divided into 12 districts. The main towns were Alexin, Bogoroditsk, Byelev, Chern, Epifan, Efremov, Kashira, Krapivna, Novosil, Odoyev, Tula, and Venev.

== Administrative division ==
Ufa Governorate consisted of the following uyezds (administrative centres in parentheses):

- Aleksinsky Uyezd (Aleksin)
- Belyovsky Uyezd (Belyov)
- Bogoroditsky Uyezd (Bogoroditsk)
- Venyovsky Uyezd (Venyov)
- Yepifansky Uyezd (Yepifan)
- Yefremovsky Uyezd (Yefremov)
- Kashirsky Uyezd (Kashira)
- Krapivensky Uyezd (Krapivna)
- Novosilsky Uyezd (Novosil)
- Odoyevsky Uyezd (Odoyev)
- Tulsky Uyezd (Tula)
- Chernsky Uyezd (Chern)

== See also ==
- Tula Oblast
