= Plava (Russia) =

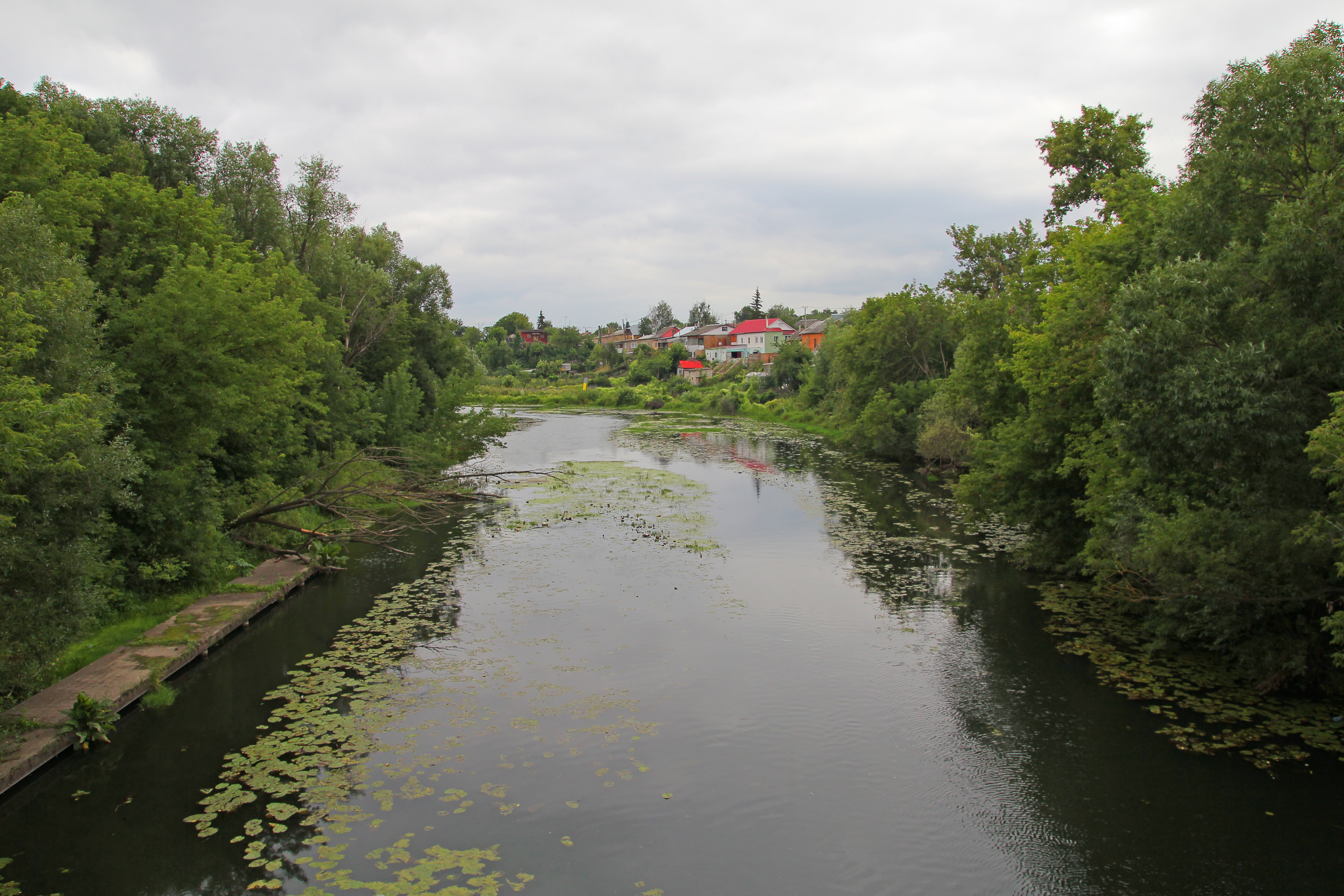
- The river in the town of Plavsk
- Native name: Плава (Russian)

Location
- Country: Russia

Physical characteristics
- Mouth: Upa
  - coordinates: 53°57′14″N 37°10′11″E
- Length: 89 km (55 mi)
- Basin size: 1,880 km^{2} (730 sq mi)

Basin features
- Progression: Upa→ Oka→ Volga→ Caspian Sea

The Plava (Russian: Плава) is a river in Tula Oblast, Russia, a right tributary of the Upa. It is 89 kilometres (55 mi) long, and has a drainage basin of 1,880 square kilometres (730 sq mi). The town of Plavsk is situated on the Plava.
