= Novosilsky Uyezd =

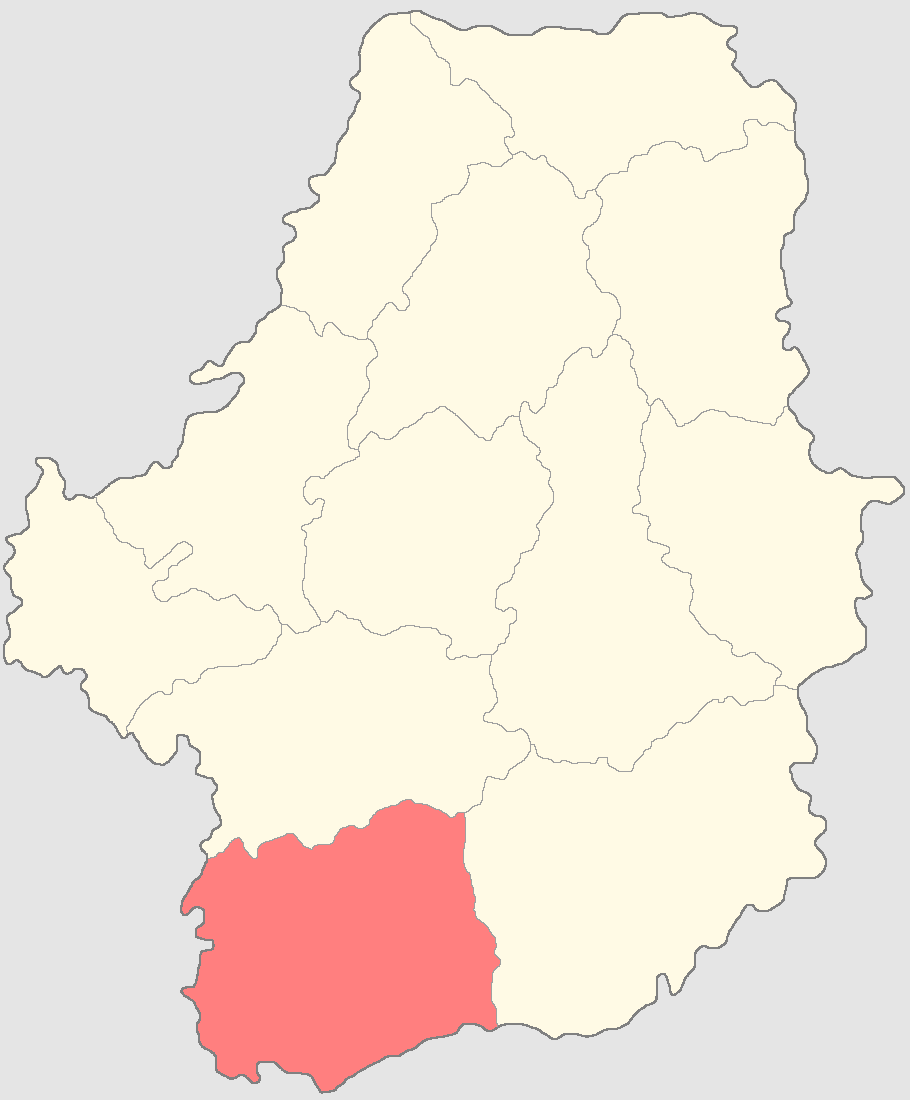
Novosilsky District on the map of Tula Governorate

Novosilsky Uyezd (Новосильский уезд) was one of the subdivisions of the Tula Governorate of the Russian Empire. It was situated in the southwestern part of the governorate. Its administrative centre was Novosil.

== Demographics ==
At the time of the Russian Empire Census of 1897, Novosilsky Uyezd had a population of 143,292. Of these, 99.9% spoke Russian as their native language.
