= Yepifan =

Coordinates: 53°48′56″N 38°33′45″E

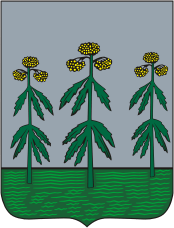
The coat of arms of Yepifan (1778) shows three stalks of cannabis

Yepifan (Russian: Епифань) is an urban locality (a work settlement) in Kimovsky District of Tula Oblast, Russia, located on the left bank of the Don River about 16 kilometers (9.9 mi) southeast of Kimovsk and 78 kilometers (48 mi) southeast of Tula, in the proximity of the Kulikovo Field. Population: 2,237 (2010 census); 2,377 (2002 census); 2,457 (1989 Soviet census).

Yepifan was founded by Knyaz Ivan Mstislavsky (Ivan the Terrible's cousin) as a fort (Yepifan Fortress) against the Crimean Tatars (see Great Abatis Border). The people of Yepifan supported Ivan Bolotnikov during the Time of Troubles. The town was ravaged by Ivan Zarutsky and the Tatars on several occasions. The last Tatar raid on Yepifan was recorded in 1659.

Peter the Great intended to connect the Volga and the Don rivers through a system of waterways and sluices centered on Yepifan. It soon became clear that the projected Ivanovsky Canal was not suitable for navigation, and the project of the Yepifan Admiralty was abandoned. Andrei Platonov wrote a novella, Yepifan Sluices (1927) on the subject.

In the 19th century, Yepifan was the center of an uyezd famed for its annual fair. The Neoclassical cathedral of St. Nicholas was consecrated in 1850 and remains the settlement's most important landmark.
