= Kashirsky Uyezd =

Kashirsky Uyezd (Каши́рский уе́зд) was one of the subdivisions of the Tula Governorate of the Russian Empire. It was situated in the northern part of the governorate. Its administrative centre was Kashira.

== Demographics ==
At the time of the Russian Empire Census of 1897, Kashirsky Uyezd had a population of 66,535. Of these, 99.9% spoke Russian and 0.1% German as their native language.
