= Venyov =

Town in Tula Oblast, Russia

Venyov Венёв
- Town
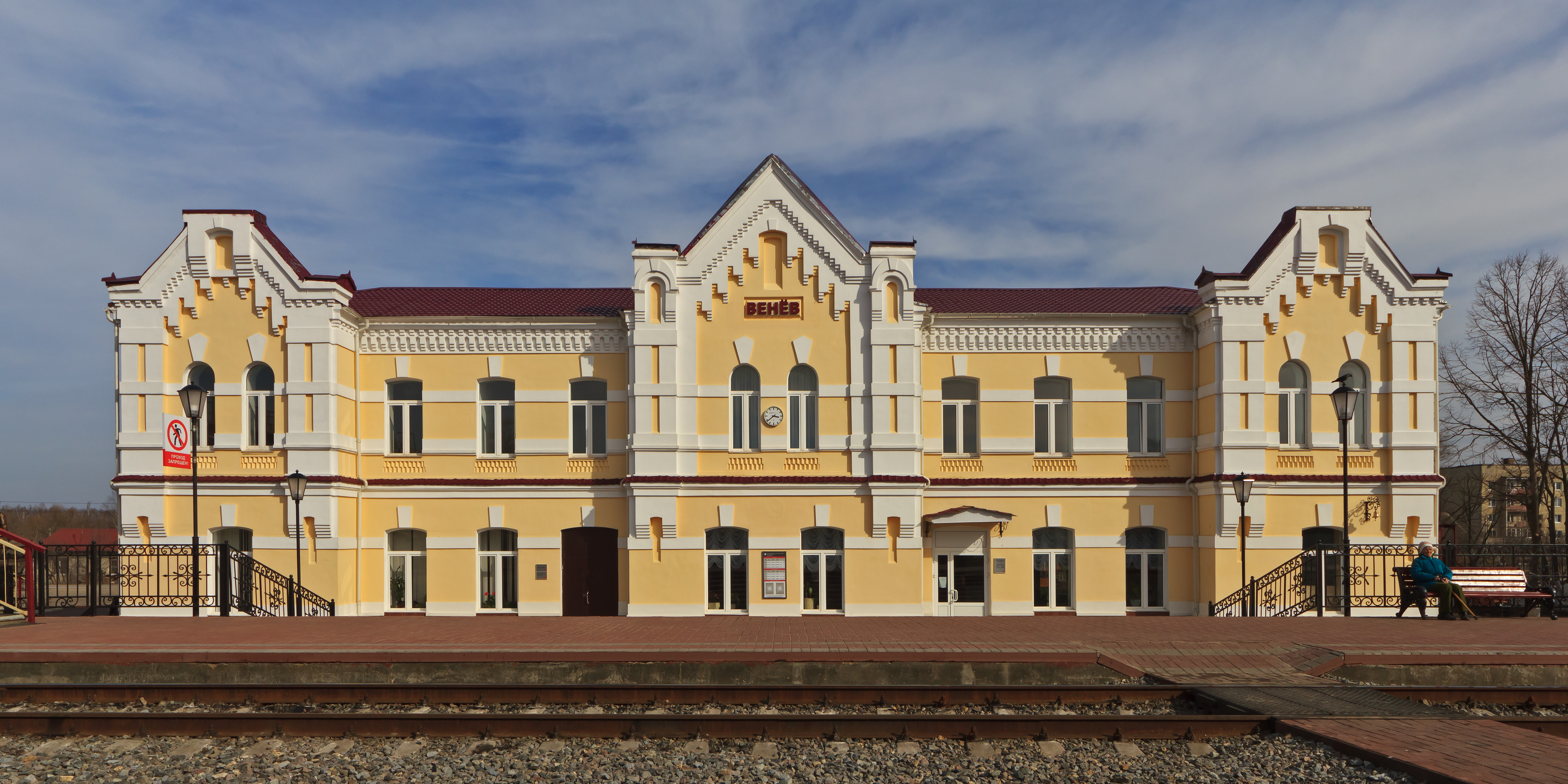
- Venyov railway station

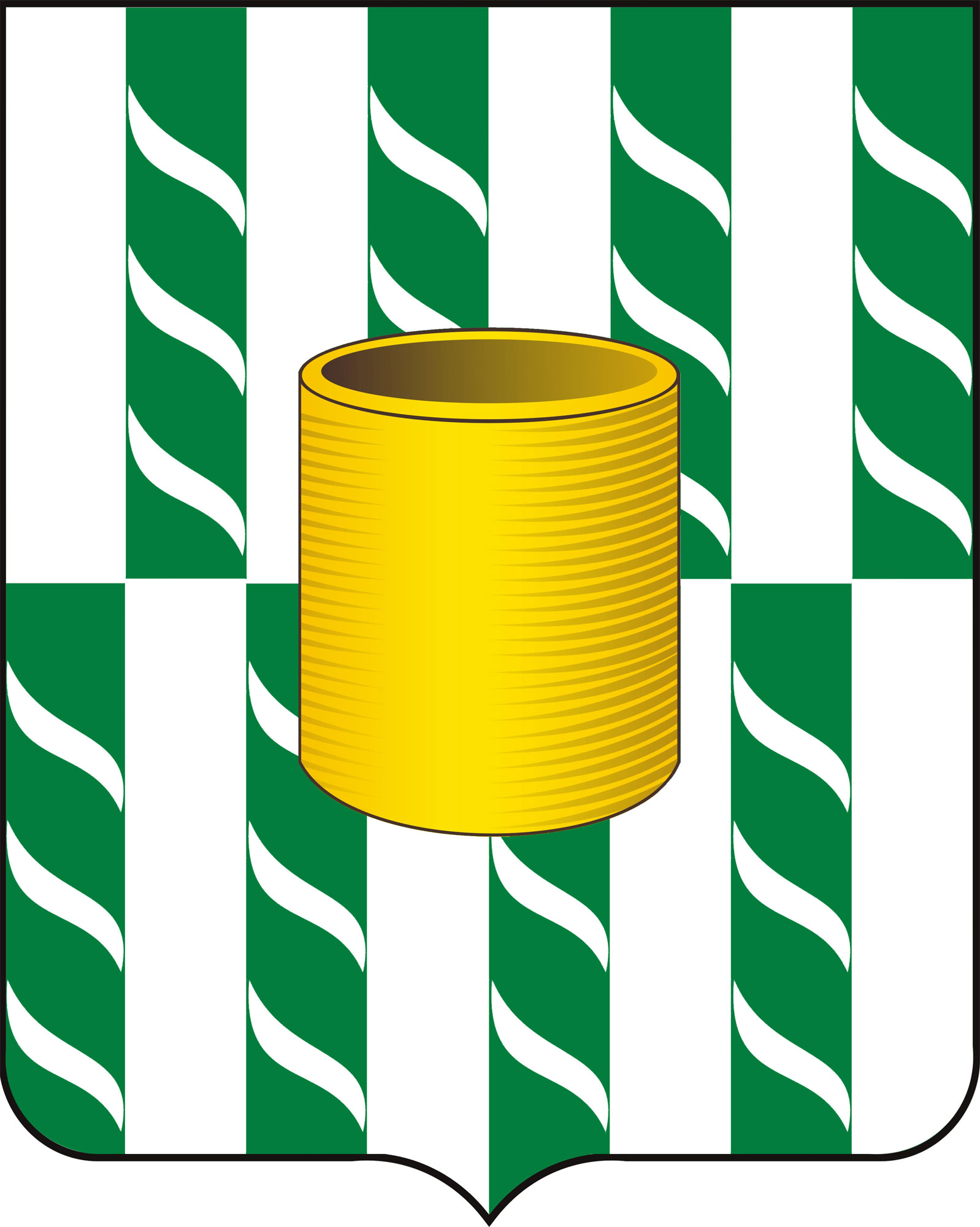
- Coat of arms
- Interactive map of Venyov
- Location of Venyov Venyov (Tula Oblast)
- Coordinates: 54°21′N 38°16′E
- Country: Russia
- Federal subject: Tula Oblast
- Administrative district: Venyovsky District
- Town under district jurisdictionSelsoviet: Venyov
- Founded: 12th century
- Town status since: 1777
- Elevation: 200 m (660 ft)

Population (2010 Census)
  - Total: 15,224
  - Estimate (2021): 12,668 (−16.8%)

Administrative status
  - Capital of: Venyovsky District, Venyov Town Under District Jurisdiction

Municipal status
  - Municipal district: Venyovsky Municipal District
  - Urban settlement: Venyov Urban Settlement
  - Capital of: Venyovsky Municipal District, Venyov Urban Settlement
- Time zone: UTC+3 (MSK)
- Postal codes: 301320, 301321
- OKTMO ID: 70612101001

Venyov (Russian: Венёв) is a town and the administrative center of Venyovsky District in Tula Oblast, Russia, located on the Venyovka River, 52 kilometers (32 mi) east of Tula, the administrative center of the oblast. Population: 15,224 (2010 census); 16,167 (2002 census); 13,243 (1989 Soviet census).

== History ==
It was founded in the 12th century approximately 7 kilometers (4.3 mi) from its present location. It was granted town status in 1777. During the Battle of Moscow in 1941, the town fell to the 2nd Panzer Group under Heinz Guderian on 24 November 1941. The short German occupation lasted until 9 December 1941, when Venyov was liberated by troops of the Western Front of the Red Army.

== Administrative and municipal status ==
Within the framework of administrative divisions, Venyov serves as the administrative center of Venyovsky District. As an administrative division, it is incorporated within Venyovsky District as Venyov Town Under District Jurisdiction. As a municipal division, Venyov Town Under District Jurisdiction is incorporated within Venyovsky Municipal District as Venyov Urban Settlement.
