= Chern, Tula Oblast =

Chern Чернь
- Urban-type settlement
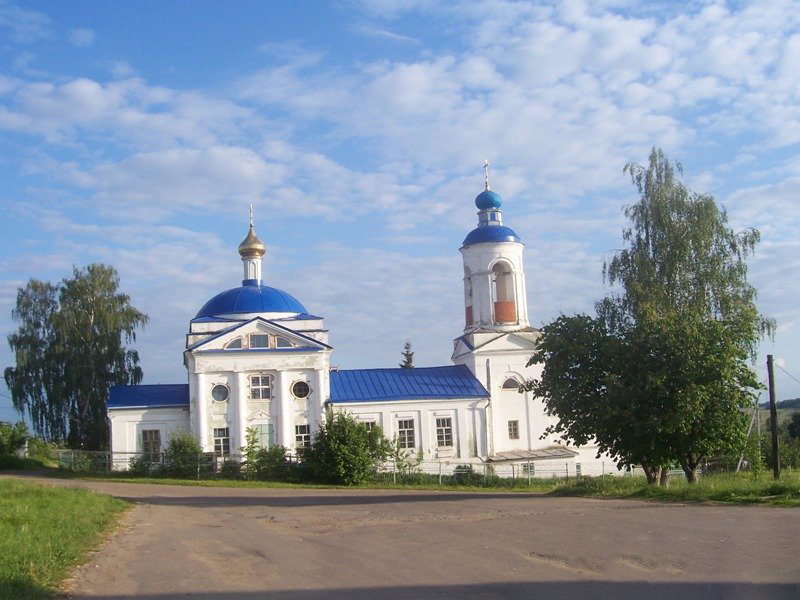

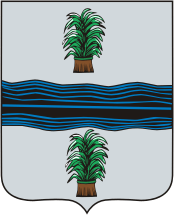
- Coat of arms
- Interactive map of Chern
- Location of Chern Chern (Tula Oblast)
- Coordinates: 53.4509°N 36.9103°E
- Country: Russia
- Federal subject: Tula Oblast
- Administrative district: Chernsky District
- Founded: 1566 (Julian)
- Elevation: 240 m (790 ft)

Population (2010 Census)
  - Total: 6,405
  - Estimate (2021): 6,156 (−3.9%)
- Time zone: UTC+3 (MSK)
- Postal code: 301090
- OKTMO ID: 70646151051

Chern (Russian: Чернь) is an urban locality (an urban-type settlement) in Chernsky District of Tula Oblast, Russia. Population: 6,405 (2010 census); 6,883 (2002 census); 6,184 (1989 Soviet census).
