= Yefremov =

Yefremov or Efremov (Russian: Ефремов) and Yefremova or Efremova (Ефремова; feminine) is a common Russian surname. It is derived from the male given name Yefrem and literally means Yefrem's. Yefrem is the Russian form of the Hebrew name Ephraim, first used by the Israelite patriarch of that name. In Hebrew, the name means "fruitful, fertile and productive". The following individuals refer to Yefremov.

- Aleksandr Yefremov:
  - Aleksandr Illarionovich Yefremov (1904–1951), Soviet politician, head of Moscow from 1938 to 1939
  - Alexander P. Yefremov (born 1945), Russian physicist
- Andriy Yefremov (born 1993), Ukrainian footballer
- Dmitry Yefremov:
  - Dmitry Yefremov (born 1974), Russian football player and coach
  - Dmitry Yefremov (born 1991), Russian football player
  - Dmitry Yefremov (born 1995), Russian football player
- Iliyan Efremov (born 1970), Bulgarian pole vaulter
- Ivan Yefremov (1907–1972), Soviet science fiction writer and paleontologist
- Ksenia Efremova (born 2009), French tennis player
- Mikhail Yefremov:
  - Mikhail Grigoryevich Yefremov (1897–1942), Soviet military commander
  - Mikhail Olegovich Yefremov (born 1963), Soviet and Russian actor, son of Oleg Yefremov
  - Mikhail Timofeyevich Yefremov (1911–2000), Soviet politician and diplomat
- Oleg Yefremov (1927–2000), Soviet and Russian actor
- Oleksandr Yefremov:
  - Oleksandr Yefremov (born 1954), Ukrainian politician
  - Oleksandr Yefremov (functionary) (born 1948), Ukrainian football functionary
- Pyotr Yefremov (1830–1908), Russian literary historian and publisher
- Serhiy Yefremov (1876–1939), Ukrainian literary journalist and political activist
- Svetlana Efremova (born 1970), Soviet-born American actress
- Yevgeni Yefremov:
  - Yevgeni Borisovich Yefremov (born 1970), retired Russian footballer
  - Yevgeni Gennadyevich Yefremov (born 1979), Russian footballer
- Yevhen Yefremov (born 1994), Ukrainian footballer
- Vasily Yefremov (1915–1990), Soviet ace, double Hero of the Soviet Union

as well as:

- Antonina Yefremova (born 1981), Ukrainian sprinter
- Lilia Vaygina-Efremova (born 1975), Ukrainian biathlete
- Nelli Yefremova (1962–2019), Soviet sprint canoer
