= Yefremov (disambiguation) =

Yefremov (fem. Yefremova) is a Russian surname.

Yefremov (masculine) or Yefremova (feminine) may also refer to:

- Yefremov Urban Okrug, a municipal formation which Yefremovsky District in Tula Oblast, Russia is incorporated as
- Yefremov (town), a town in Tula Oblast, Russia
- Yefremov air base, a military airfield near Yefremov, Russia
- 12975 Efremov, a main-belt asteroid

== See also ==
- Yefremovo (disambiguation)
- Yefremovsky (disambiguation)
- Ephraim (disambiguation)
