= Ephraim (disambiguation) =

Ephraim was a Biblical patriarch.

Ephraim or Efraim may also refer to:

== People and fictional characters ==
- Tribe of Ephraim
- Ephraim (given name), a list of people and fictional characters named Ephraim or Efraim
- Ephraim (surname)
- Efraim (footballer), Brazilian footballer Efraim Gomes Júnior (1942–2017)

== Places ==
- the northern Kingdom of Israel (Samaria), sometimes referred to as "Ephraim" in the Nevi'im (Prophets)
- Ephraim in the wilderness or Ephraim, a city or village in Judea mentioned in the New Testament (John 11)
- Ephraim, Utah, United States, a city
- Ephraim, Wisconsin, United States, a village
- Mount Ephraim (Vermont), a mountain in Springfield, Vermont, United States

== See also ==
- Wood of Ephraim, a place mentioned in the Bible
- Mount Ephraim (disambiguation)
- Old Ephraim, a grizzly bear
- Ephrem (name)
- Yefremov (disambiguation)
- The Book of Ephraim, a 1976 poem by James Merrill in his 1982 trilogy The Changing Light at Sandover
