= Ephraim (given name) =

Ephraim (also Efraim) is a masculine given name of Hebrew and Aramaic origin, first used by the Israelite patriarch of that name. In the modern English language, it is typically pronounced /'i:f.rəm/. In Hebrew, the name means "fruitful, fertile and productive".

Alternative spellings include Ephrem, Efrem, Efreom, Ephraem, Efren, or Efrén.

== People ==
=== Ephraim ===
- Ephraim the Syrian (c. 306–373), Syrian Christian theologian, writer, hymnographer, and saint
- Ephraim of Antioch (died 545), Greek Orthodox Patriarch of Antioch and saint
- Ephrem Mtsire (died 1101), also known as Ephraim the Lesser, Georgian Orthodox monk and saint
- Ephraim the Neomartyr (1384–1426), Greek Orthodox martyr and saint
- Ephraim Amu (1899–1995), Ghanaian composer
- Ephraim Anderson (1911–2006), British bacteriologist
- Ephraim Wales Bull (1806-1895), creator of the Concord grape
- Ephraim Willard Burr (1809–1894), American politician
- Ephraim Chambers (1680–1740), English writer
- Ephraim Clarke (1846–1921), Australian politician
- Ephraim Curzon (1883–?), English rugby league footballer
- Ephraim Ellis (born 1985), Canadian actor
- Ephraim Emerton (1851–1935), American medievalist historian
- Ephraim Evron (1920–1995), Israeli diplomat
- Ephraim P. Felt (1868–1943), American entomologist
- Ephraim S. Fisher (1815–1876), American judge
- Ephie Fitzgerald (born 1961), Irish Gaelic footballer and manager
- Ephraim Grizzard (died 1892), American lynching victim
- Ephraim Hanson (1872–1952), justice of the Utah Supreme Court
- Ephraim Hart (1747–1825), American merchant
- Ephraim P. Holmes (1908–1997), American admiral
- Ephraim Jones (1750–1812), Canadian judge and politician
- Ephraim Katz (1932–1992), Israeli-born American film historian
- Ephraim Katzir (1916–2009), Israeli politician
- Ephraim Keyser (1850–1937), American sculptor
- Ephraim Kishon (1924–2005), Israeli writer
- Ephraim Lederer (1862–1925), American lawyer
- Ephraim Lewis (1968–1994), English singer-songwriter
- Ephraim Lipson (1888–1960), British economic historian
- Ephraim McDowell (1771–1830), American physician
- Ephraim Morse (1823–1906), American businessman
- Ephraim Oshry (1914–2003), Lithuanian-born American rabbi
- Ephraim G. Peyton (1802–after 1876), American judge
- Ephraim Salaam (born 1976), American football player
- Ephraim Serrette (born 1957), Trinidad and Tobago sprinter
- Ephraim Shay (1839–1916), American inventor
- Ephraim Sidon (born 1946), Israeli author
- Ephraim Sklyansky (1892–1925), Russian revolutionary
- Ephraim M. Sparrow (1928–2019), American engineering professor
- Ephraim Stern (1934–2018), Israeli archaeologist
- Ephraim Titler (1800–?), Liberian politician
- Ephraim Williams (1715–1755), American soldier
- Ephraim King Wilson (1771–1834), American politician
- Ephraim K. Wilson II (1821–1891), American politician

=== Efraim ===
- Efraim (footballer), Brazilian footballer Efraim Gomes Júnior (1942–2017)
- Efraim Allsalu (1929–2006), Estonian painter
- Efraim Amira, Israeli football player
- Efi Arazi (1937–2013), Israeli businessman
- Effi Birnbaum (born 1954), Israeli basketball coach
- Efraím Cardozo (1877–1951), Paraguayan politician and historian
- Efraim Diveroli, American arms dealer
- Effi Eitam (born 1952), Israeli politician
- Efraim Gur (born 1955), Israeli politician
- Efraim Halevy (born 1934), Israeli lawyer and intelligence officer
- Efraim Karsh (born 1953), Israeli historian
- Efraim Leo (born 1997), Swedish singer and songwriter
- Efraim Margolin, Israeli-American businessman and philanthropist
- Efraim Medina Reyes (born 1967), Colombian writer
- Efraim Racker (1913–1991), Austrian biochemist
- Efraím Rico (born 1967), Colombian cyclist
- Efraim Sevela (1928–2010), Russian writer, Soviet dissident
- Efraim Shalom (1934–2017), Israeli politician
- Efraim Sneh (born 1944), Israeli politician, physician and military commander
- Efraim Taburi (1900–1957), Israeli Zionist activist and politician
- Effi Wizen (born 1956), Israeli computer animator and visual effects specialist
- Efraim Zuroff (born 1948), Israeli historian and Nazi hunter

=== Efraím ===
- Efraím Basílio Krevey (1928–2012), Ukrainian Greek Catholic bishop in Brazil

== Fictional characters ==
- Ephraim Black, in the Twilight series
- Ephraim Brown, in the TV series Everwood
- Ephraim Cabot, in the play Desire Under the Elms by Eugene O'Neill, as well as a 1958 film adaptation
- Ephraim Goodweather, in the 2009 horror novel The Strain by Guillermo del Toro
- Ephraim Lapham, in the 1943 novel Johnny Tremain by Esther Forbes
- Ephraim Tutt, in the novels of Arthur Train
- Prince Ephraim, one of the two main characters of the 2004 video game Fire Emblem: The Sacred Stones
- Ephraim Winslow, in the 2019 film The Lighthouse
