= Ephrem (name) =

Ephrem is a masculine given name, a variant spelling of Ephraim (also spelled Efrem, Efreom, Ephraem, Efren or Efrén). It is the name of biblical Ephraim, a son of Joseph and ancestor of the Tribe of Ephraim.

== People ==
=== First name ===
==== Pre-Modern ====
- Saint Ephrem, one of the Hieromartyrs of Cherson (died c. 310)
- Saint Ephrem the Syrian (306–373)
- Ephrem Mtsire, Georgian monk (died 1101)

==== Modern ====
- Ignatius Aphrem I Barsoum, Syriac Orthodox Patriarch of Antioch (1887–1957)
- Ignatius Ephrem II Rahmani, Syriac Catholic Patriarch of Antioch (1848–1929)
- Ignatius Aphrem II, Syriac Orthodox Patriarch of Antioch (born 1965)
- Efrem Forni, Italian Cardinal (1889–1976)
- Efrem Hill, American football player (born 1983)
- Efrem Kurtz, Russian conductor (1900–1995)
- Ephrem M'Bom, Cameroonian football player (1954–2020)
- Efrim Menuck, Canadian musician (born 1970)
- Efrem Partible, American animator (born 1971)
- Efrem Schulz, American musician (born 1975)
- Efrem Winters, American basketball player (1963–2025)
- Efrem Zimbalist, Russian-born American violinist (1890–1985)
- Efrem Zimbalist Jr., American actor (1918–2014)

=== Surname ===
- Georgios Efrem, Cypriot football player (b. 1989)
- Mérovée Ephrem, French figure skater (b. 1990)
- Sebhat Ephrem, Eritrean general and politician (b. 1951)

== See also ==
- Efrem, Bulgaria, a village
- Ephraim (disambiguation)
