= Yefremov railway station =

Railway station in Yefremov, Russia

Coordinates: 53.1484°N 38.1248°E

Yefremov
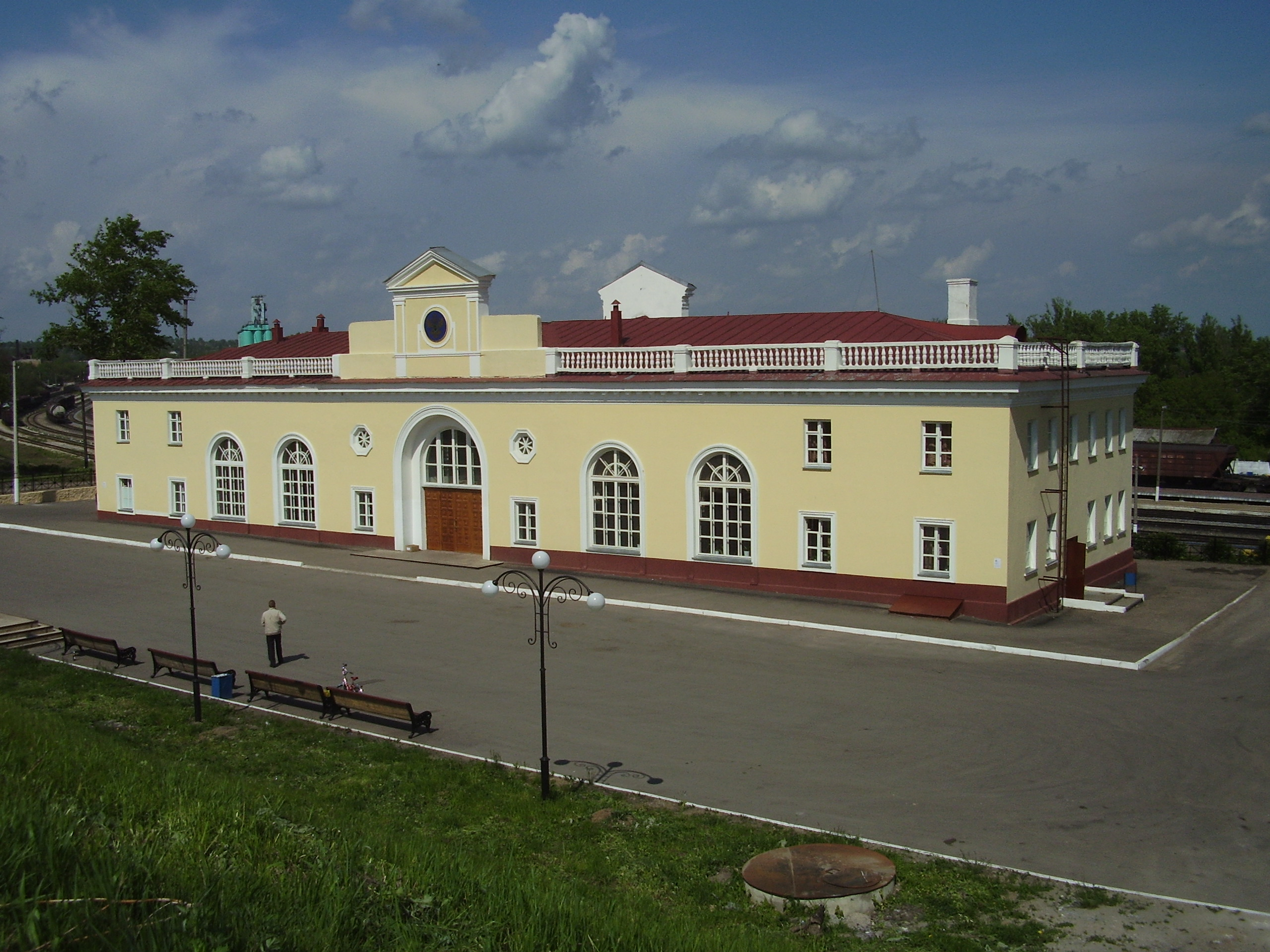

General information
- Location: Uspensky Street and Lenin Street; Yefremov, Tula Oblast; Russia
- Operator: Russian Railways: Moscow Railway (for trains between Moscow and Yefremov)
- Platforms: 2
- Tracks: 10

Other information
- Station code: 225300 (Unified Network Layout); 2000250 (Express-3)

History
- Opened: 1874

Services
Preceding station	Russian Railways	Following station
Malaya Andreyevka towards Moscow Paveletsky	Paveletsky Suburban	Stanovaya towards Uzunovo
through to Paveletsky suburban	Yefremov–Valuyki	Stanovaya towards Valuyki
Location

Yefremov is a station of the Moscow Railway. It is located in the city of Yefremov, Tula Region.

== Summary ==
It is part of the Tula Center for the Organization of the Work of Railway Stations DCS-4 of the Moscow Directorate of Traffic Control. In terms of the main nature of the work, it is a freight one, in terms of the volume of work, it is assigned to class 3. One of the largest stations on the non-electrified Ozherelye - Yelets section. Several access roads depart from the station.

It is a connection between the Moscow and South-Eastern railways. The border between the two railways passes south of the station, behind the railway bridge over the Krasivaya Mecha River, the line to Yelets belongs to the Belgorod region of the South Eastern Railway.

The station building is located on a hill, and the platforms are located between the middle tracks of the station. Access to them is possible only by a pedestrian bridge or decking.

The station was opened in 1874 on the branch of the Ryazhsko-Vyazma railway from Uzlovaya to Yelets. An important role in this was played by D. D. Obolensky. In 1931, the station was rebuilt, in 1954 a two-story station was built. In October 1919, M. I. Kalinin came on a propaganda train to Yefremov, where he made a fiery speech to the Yefremov workers.

On the occasion of the 140th anniversary of the birth of the writer Ivan Bunin, a monument in his honor was erected on the observation deck near the station in 2013. The author of the monument is Alexander Burganov.

== Passenger traffic ==
All suburban and long-distance trains stop at the station. Suburban traffic is served by CSPC trains. Suburban traffic connects Yefremov with the cities of the Tula region: Bogoroditsk, Uzlovaya, Novomoskovsk.

== Gallery ==
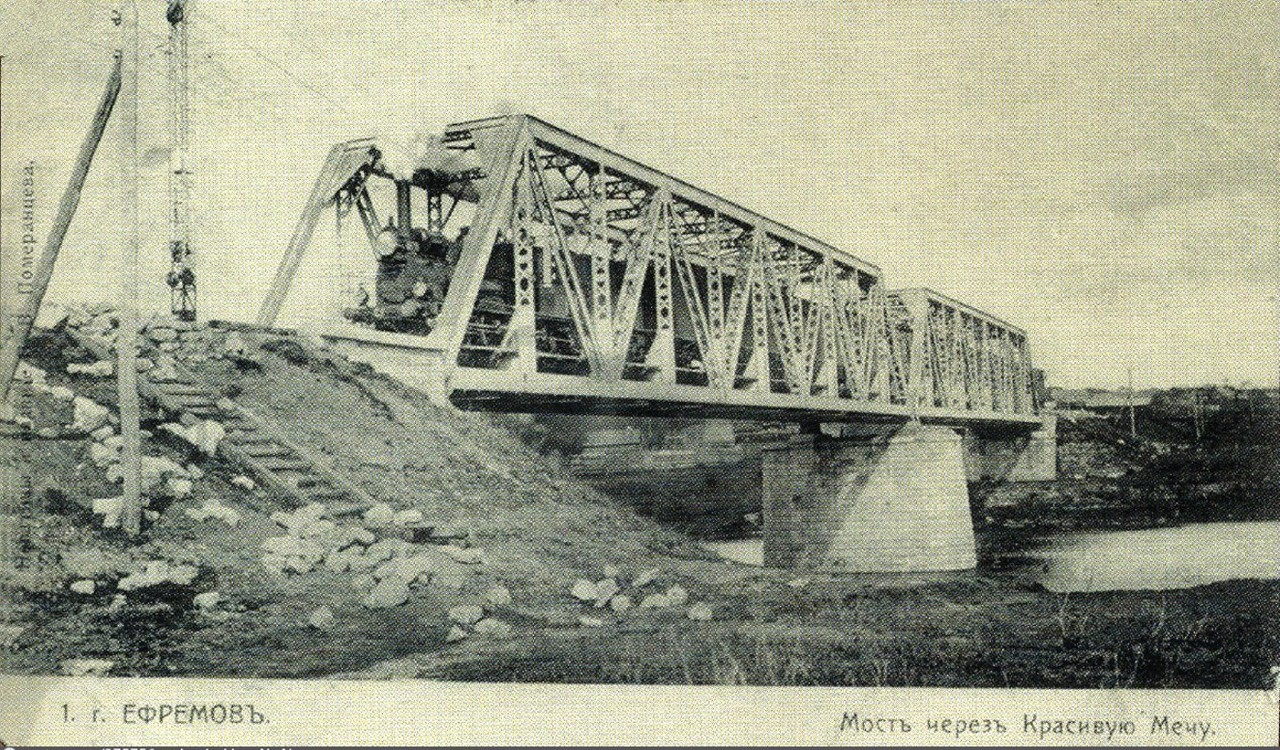
Bridge over the Krasivaya Mecha (c. 1900)

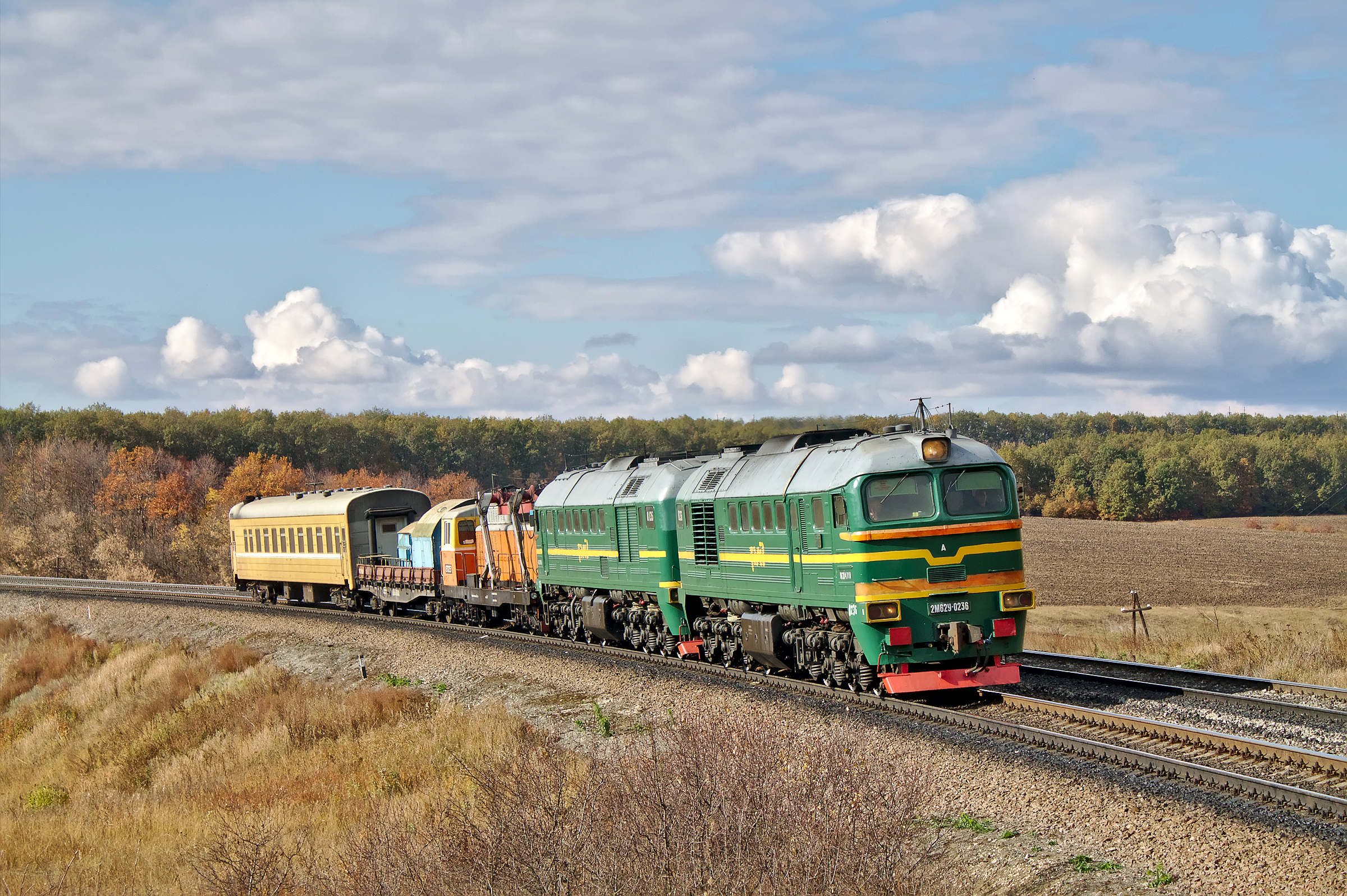
On the Malaya Andreevka - Yefremov stretch

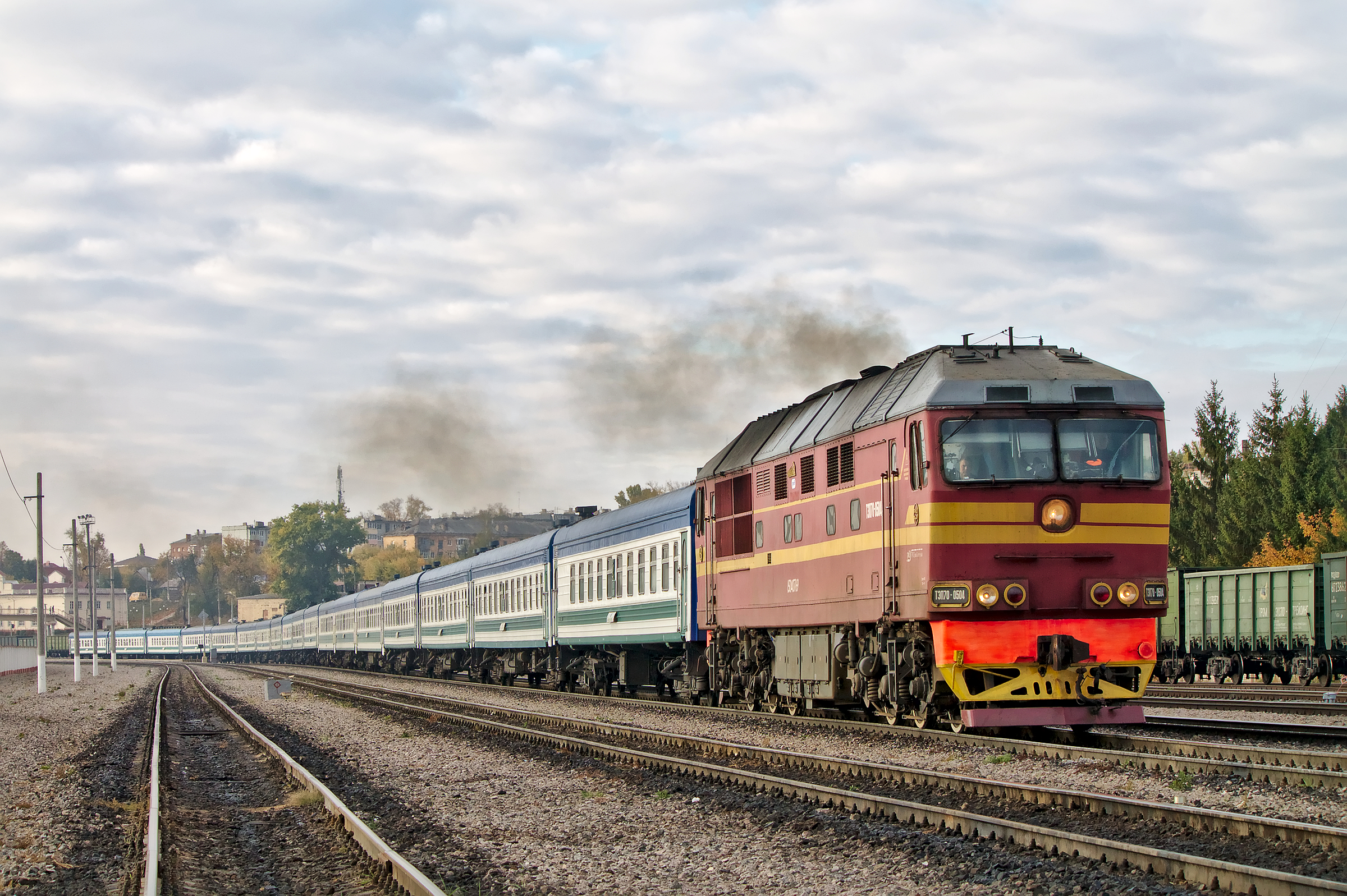
Tashkent — St. Petersburg train at Yefremov station

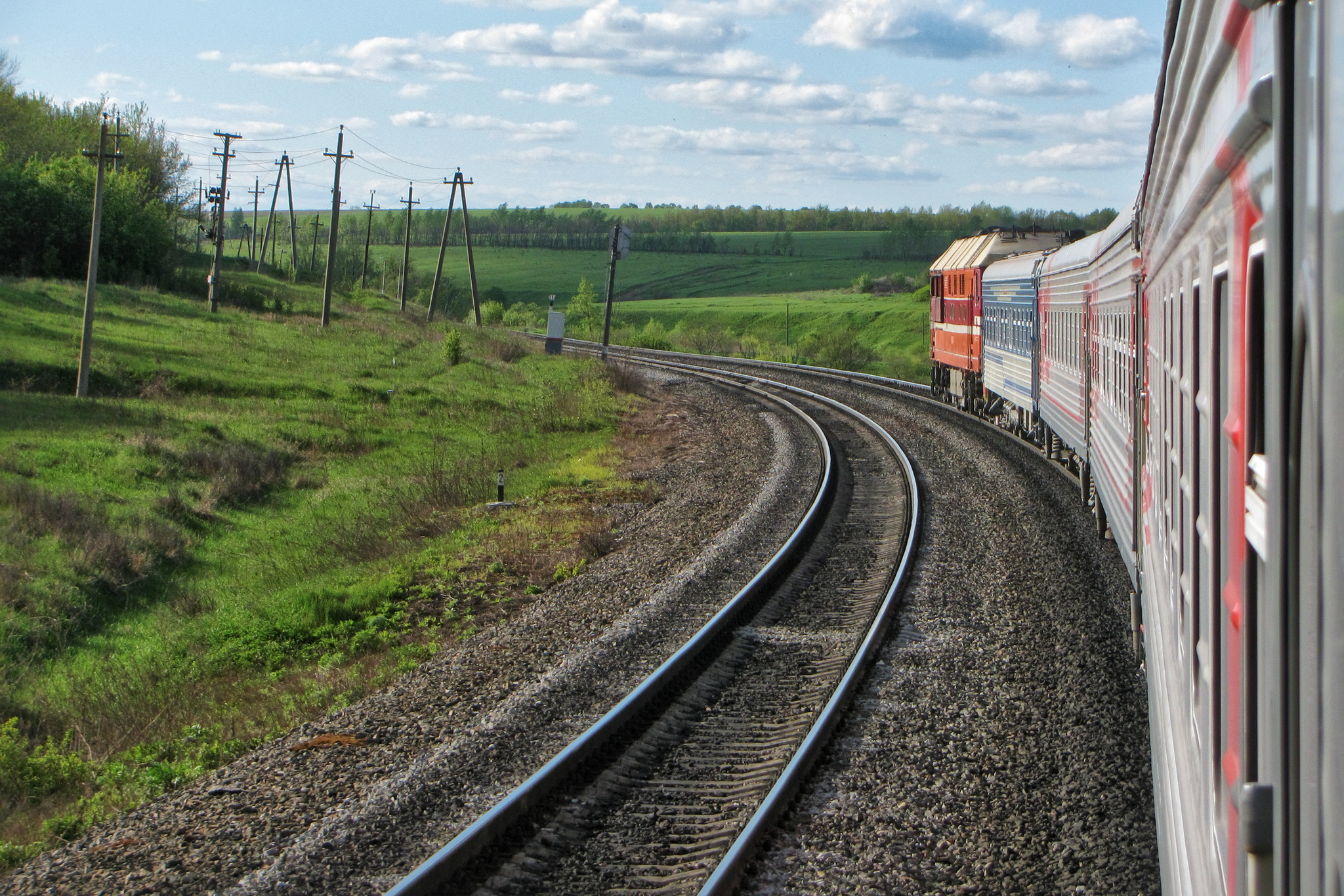
On the way between Yefremov and Uzlovaya
