= Yefremovsky =

Yefremovsky (masculine), Yefremovskaya (feminine), or Yefremovskoye (neuter) may refer to:

- Yefremovsky District, a district of Tula Oblast, Russia
- Yefremovsky (rural locality) (Yefremovskaya, Yefremovskoye), several rural localities in Russia
