= Dmitry Yefremov =

Dmitry Yefremov may refer to:

- Dmitry Yefremov (footballer, born 1974), Russian football player and coach
- Dmitry Yefremov (footballer, born 1991), Russian football player
- Dmitry Yefremov (footballer, born 1995), Russian football player
