= Fountains in Moscow =

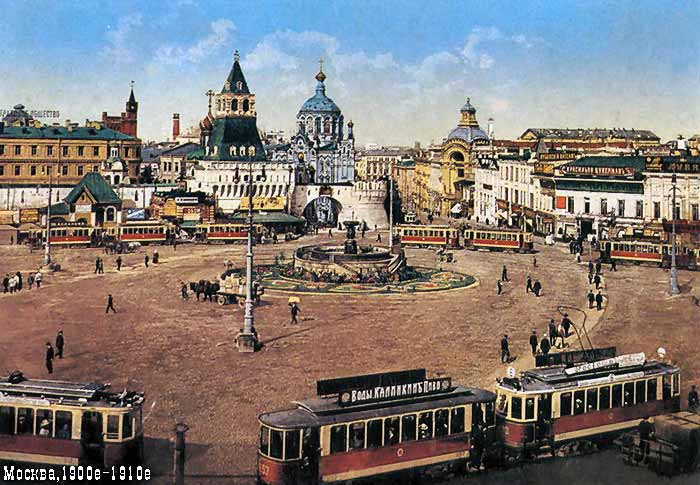
The Nikolayevsky Fountain on Lubyanka Square (about 1910). Built in 1835, the fountain was replaced by a statue of KGB founder Felix Dzherzhinsky in Soviet times

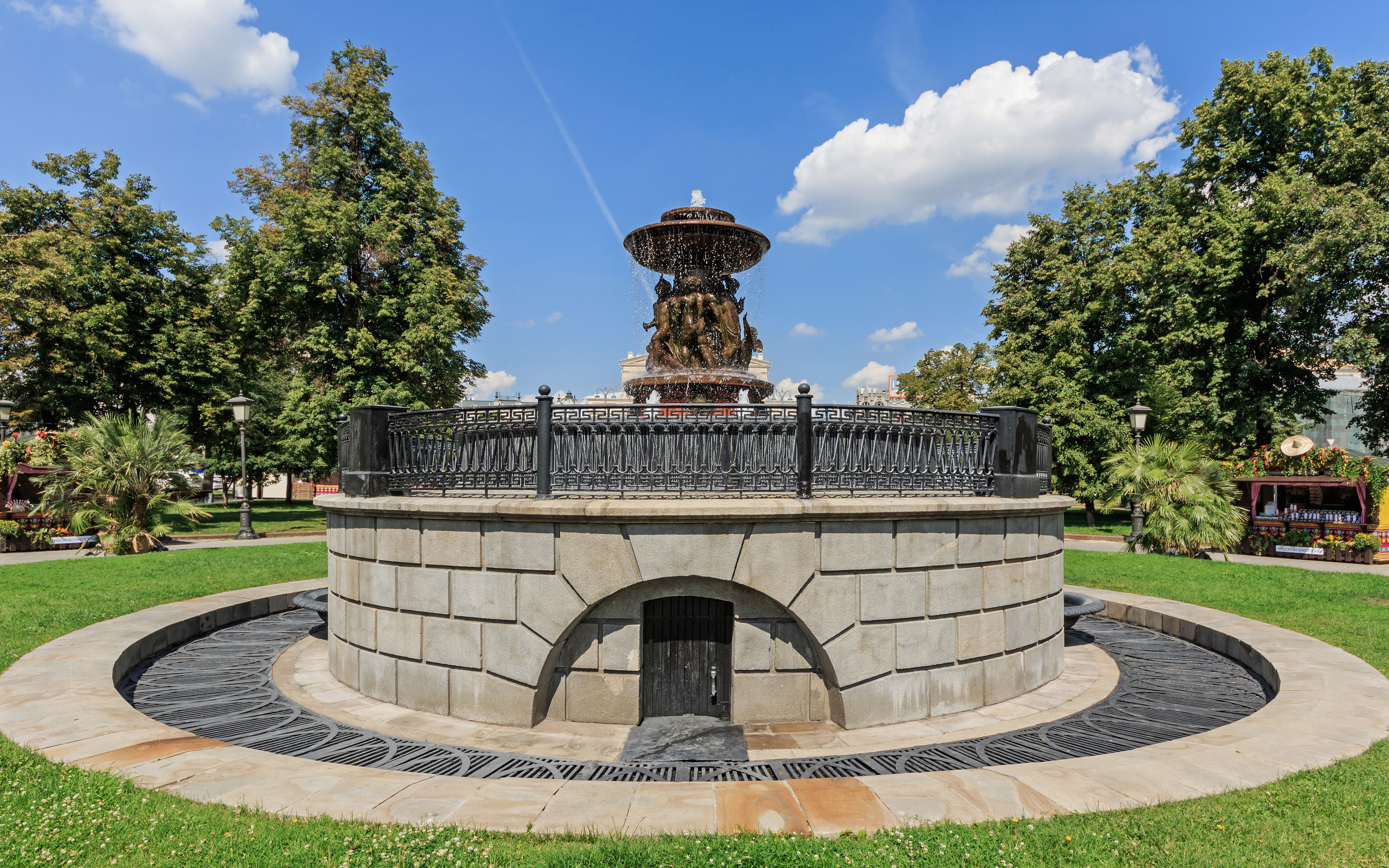
The Petrovskiy Fountain on Theater Square in front of the Bolshoi Theater (1835), the oldest existing fountain in Moscow

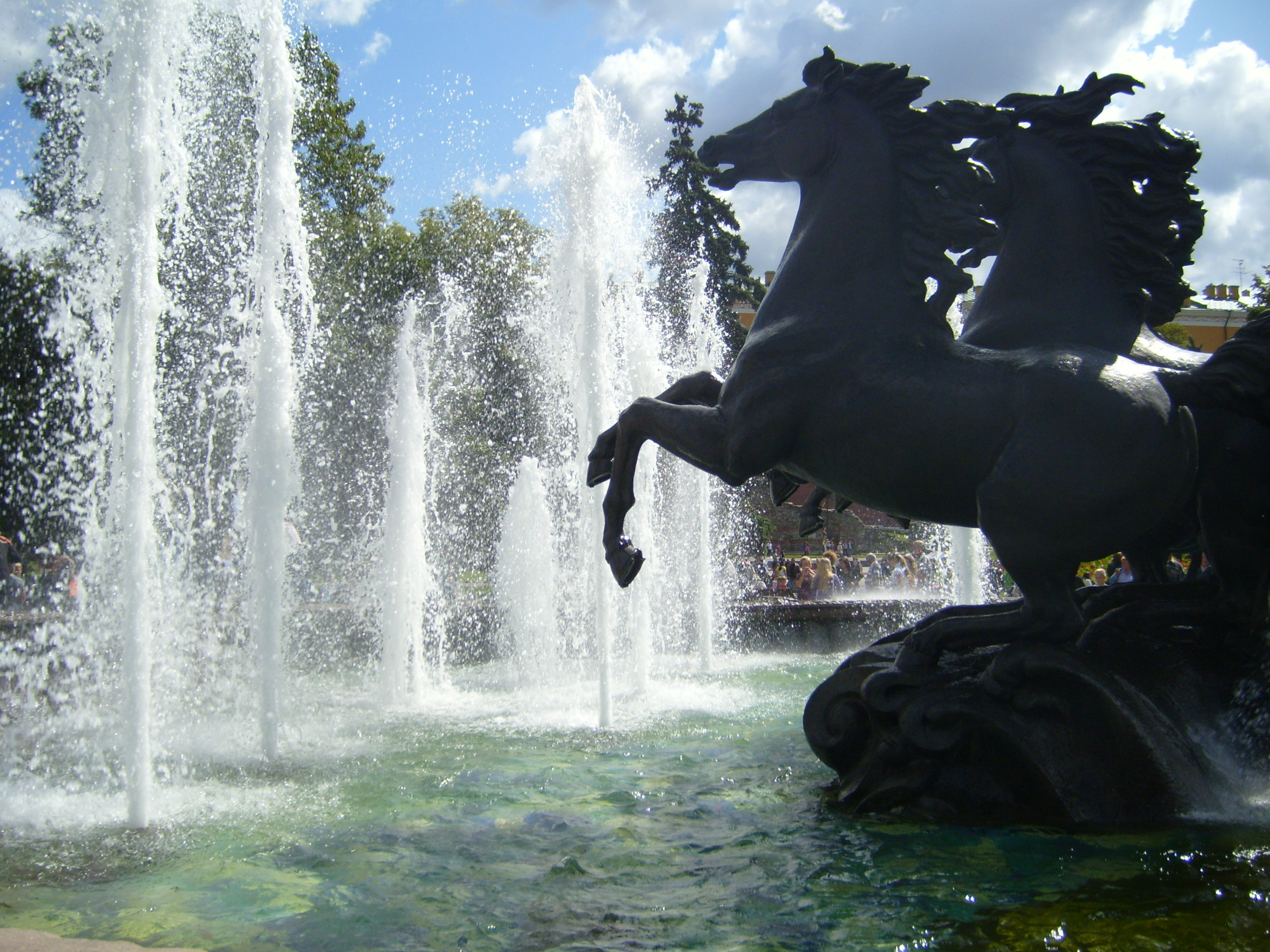
Fountain by Zurab Tsereteli in Alexander Garden, (1996)

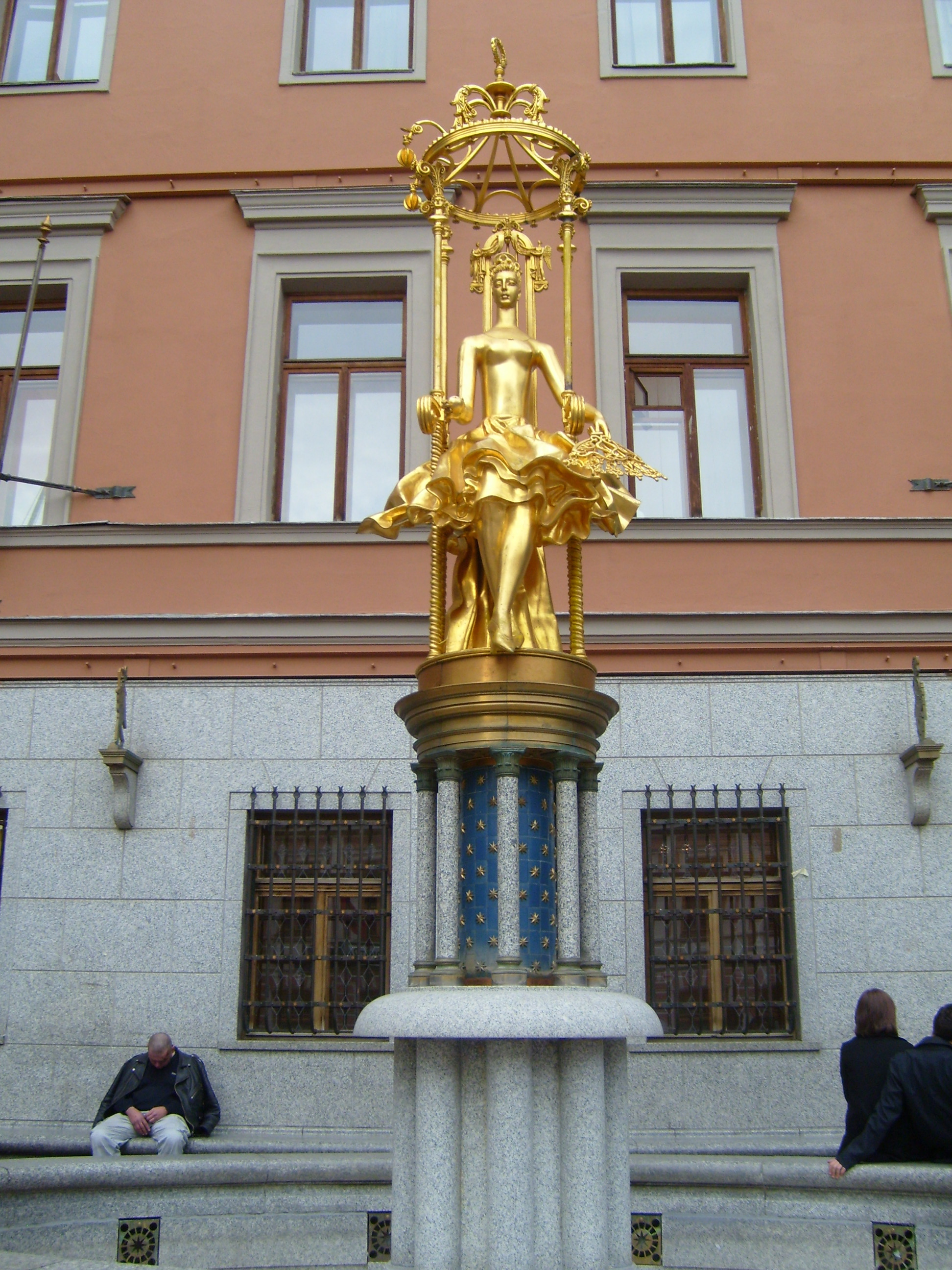
Princess Turandot Fountain, Old Arbat Street, by Alexander Bourganov (1997)

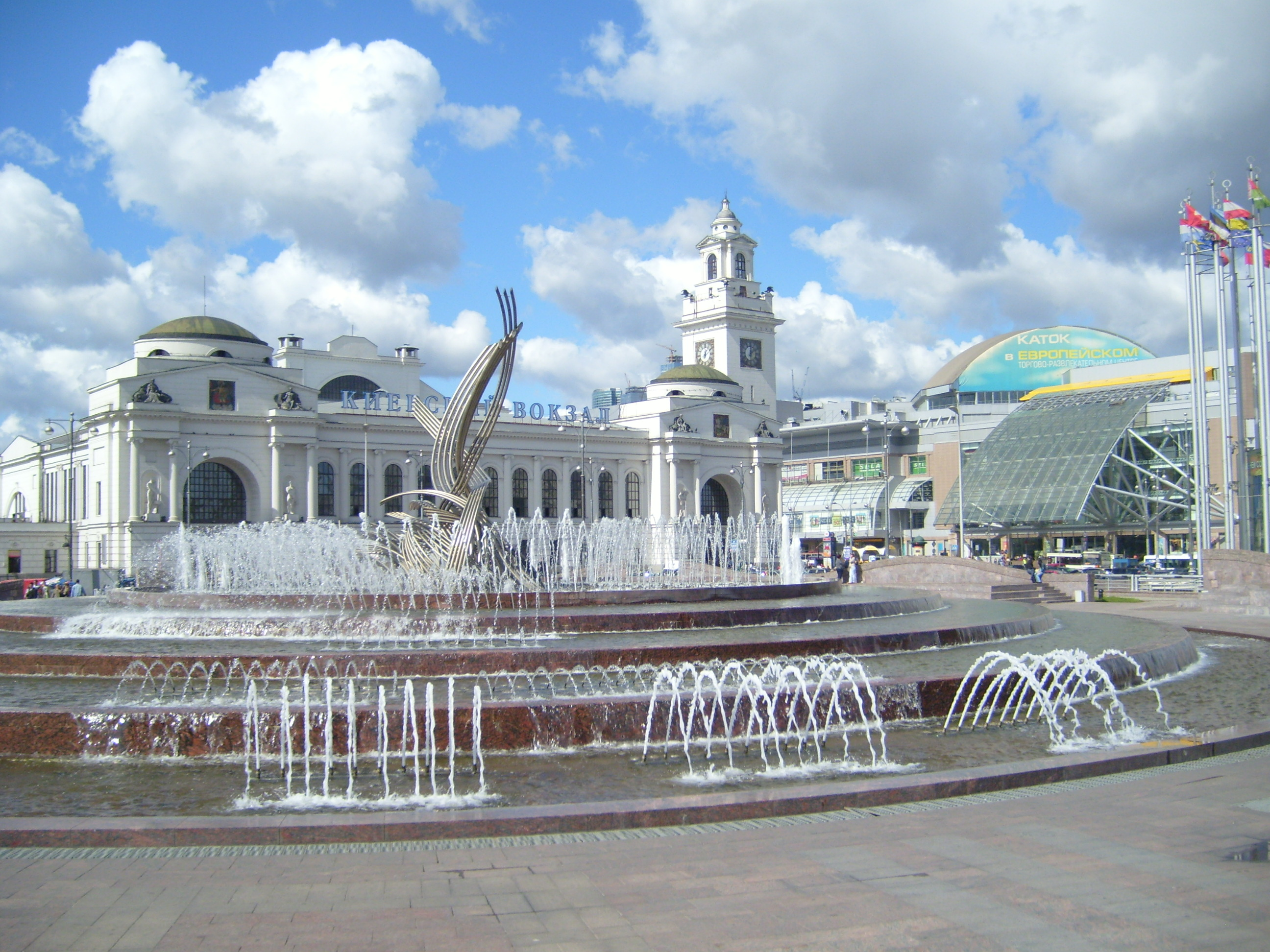
"Abduction of Europa" Fountain, by Belgian sculptor Olivier Strebelle, Europe Square (2002)

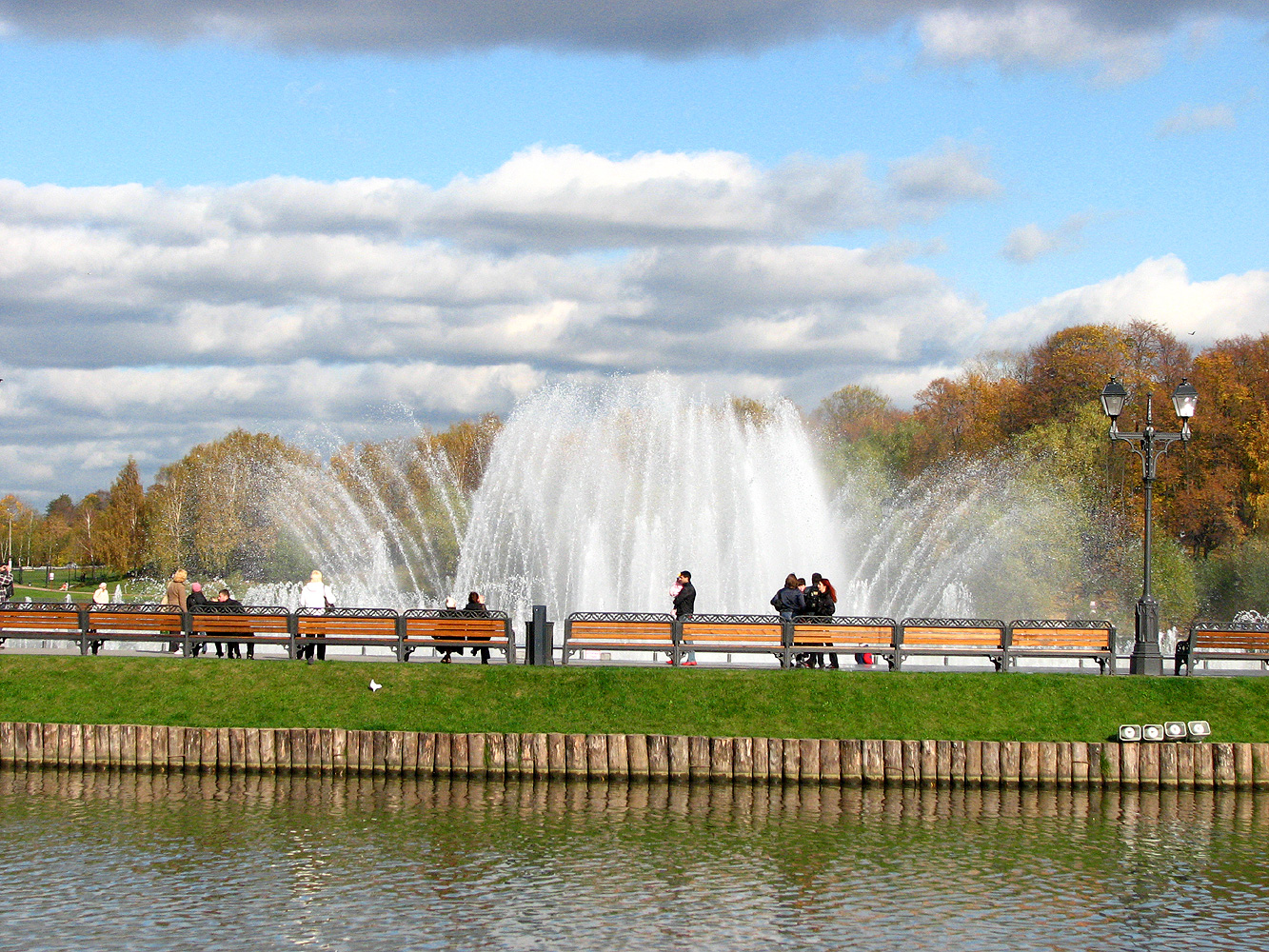
Musical fountain at Tsaritsino (2007)

The Fountains in Moscow once provided drinking water to Muscovites, and now decorate many of the city's squares and parks. Only one fountain built before the 1917 Revolution, the Petrovskiy Fountain in front of the Bolshoi Theater, still remains on its original site. Few fountains were built in Soviet times, but many new fountains were built in the 1990s and first decade of the 21st century during the city's post-Soviet economic boom. Because of the cold climate, the fountains only operate in the warm season, usually from May 1 until October 1.

== Moscow Fountains in the Czarist Era ==
The first fountains in Moscow were built in the early 19th century, after the completion of the Mitischinskovo aqueduct, which brought clean drinking water to the center of the city. The first fountain in Moscow was located on Trubnaya Square, near the Roshdestvenskovo Monastery. Several fountains were built along the Neglinnaya River.

Between 1830 and 1835 five new fountains were constructed in Moscow; the Sheremeteskiy Fountain near the Sukhareva Tower; the Nikolayevskiy Fountain on Lubyanka Square; the Petrovskiy Fountain on Theater Square, in front of the Bolshoi Theater; the Voskresenskiy Fountain near the entrance to the Alexander Garden, and the Varvarskiy on Kulishkakh Fountain, near Varvarskaya and Slavyanskaya Squares. The Sheremetevskiy and Nikolayevskiy Fountains were later demolished. The Varvarskiy on Kulikakh Fountain was moved in 1932 to Leninsky Prospect, in front of the building of the Academy of Sciences. Only a part remains from the Voskresenskiy Fountain at Alexander Garden, hidden by a metal covering. Only the Petrovskiy Fountain remains in its original site separated from the Bolshoi Theater by the Monument to Karl Marx.

In 1851-53, following the construction of a new water main between at the Babyetgorodskiy Dam and the Krasnoholmskiy Bridge, the city engineer Maksimov built new fountains for supplying drinking water on Arbat Square and Tverskaya Square (now Pushkin Square), at the Pashkov mansion near the Kremlin; on Zatsep Square, Serpukhovskaya Square, Kaluzhskaya Square, Pyatnitskaya Street and Polyanka Street. Decorative fountains were placed on Sobachaya Square, the corner of Mokhovaya Street and Znamenka Street and other locations around the city.

The Nikolayevskiy Fountain and Petrovskiy Fountain, both built in 1835, were embellished with bronze statues of the muses of theater, made by the I.P. Vitali. Water-porters carried drinking water from these fountains to local residents. The Petrovskiy Fountain on Theater Square also had a two basins providing drinking water for horses.

== Moscow Fountains of the Soviet Era ==
During the reconstruction of Moscow carried out by Joseph Stalin beginning in the 1930s, all the old fountains, with the exception of the Petrovskiy Fountain in front of the Bolshoi Theater, were demolished. A few new fountains were built to take their place; in 1941 the architect V.A. Vlasov constructed a new fountain on Sovyetskaya Square (now Tverskaya Square). Between 1940 and 1950 other new fountains were built on Arbat Square; Pushkin Square; Repin Square (now Bolotnaya Square); on Second Peschanaya Street; and in Sokolniki Park; and on Kaluzhsaya Square.

The most imposing fountains of the Soviet era were begun in 1954 in the new Park of Soviet Economic Achievements, or VDNKh. They included the Colossus Fountain, the Stone Flower Fountain, and the largest of all, Friendship of the Peoples Fountain, an enormous basin decorated with statues representing the different nationalities and Republics of the Soviet Union. This fountain was the work of architects K.G. Topuradze, G.D. Konstantinovskiy, and sculptors Joseph Chaikov, E.V.Bazhenova, P.I. Dobrynin and others. The basin of water had an area of 3700 square meters, holding 4000 cubic meters of water. The water was shot upwards from some 800 spouts, and the highest spout jetted upward 24 meters. The fountains were lit by 4525 lamps and projectors.

Later, different color lights were added to older fountains. In 1975 the Bolotnaya Square fountain became the first musical fountain in Moscow with light synchronized with recorded music. It was the last fountain built in Moscow in the Soviet Era.

== Moscow Fountains of the Post-Soviet period ==
The first fountain built in Moscow after the breakup of the Soviet Union in 1991 was the fountain in the memorial complex on Poklonnaya Hill, built in 1995 to commemorate the 50th anniversary of the end of World War II. To mark the 850th anniversary of the city of Moscow, a number of old Moscow fountains were rebuilt restored; notably at Pushkin Square, where the fountain was rebuilt atop the Metro Station; the Petrovskiy Fountain at Theater Square, which was restored, and the Colossus Fountain in the old Park of Soviet Economic Achievements.

In the 1990s and first decade of the 21st century, Yuri Luzhkov, Mayor of Moscow from 1992 through 2010, commissioned several Moscow sculptors, including Zurab Tsereteli and Alexander Bourganov, to build fountains in the city's squares. Tsereteli built a complex of twelve fountains in Manezhnaya Square, next to the Alexandrovskiy Garden. The main fountain is called The Geyser. Other fountains are the Four Seasons, symbolized by bronze horses; The Curtain (Ru: Zavesa), and Heroes of Fairy Tales, an array of canals with statues illustrating the fairy tales of Ivan Krylov. Bourganov built the Turandot Fountain next to the Vakhtangov Theater on the Old Arbat. It represents the heroine of the play which was the signature work of the Vakhtangov Theater in Soviet times.

In 2007, the ruined palace of Catherine the Great in Tsaritsyno Park was "completed" as it might have been intended to look, with many imaginative additions, and a large musical fountain, with music coordinated with the rise of fall of the fountain, was built in the lake in the center of the park near the palace.

== Gallery of Moscow Fountains ==
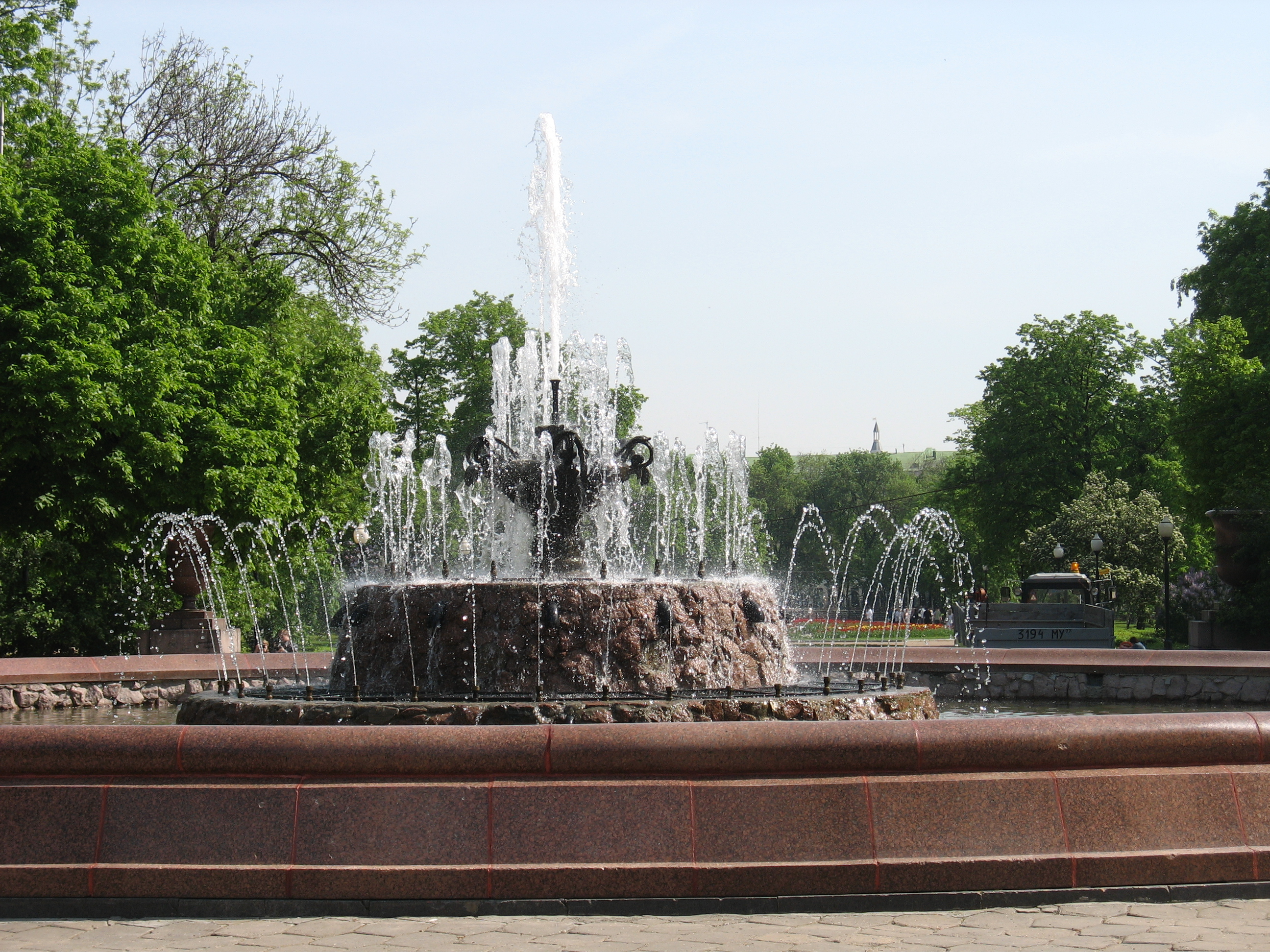
Fountain on Bolotnaya Square (1948), one of the few fountains built in the Stalin era.

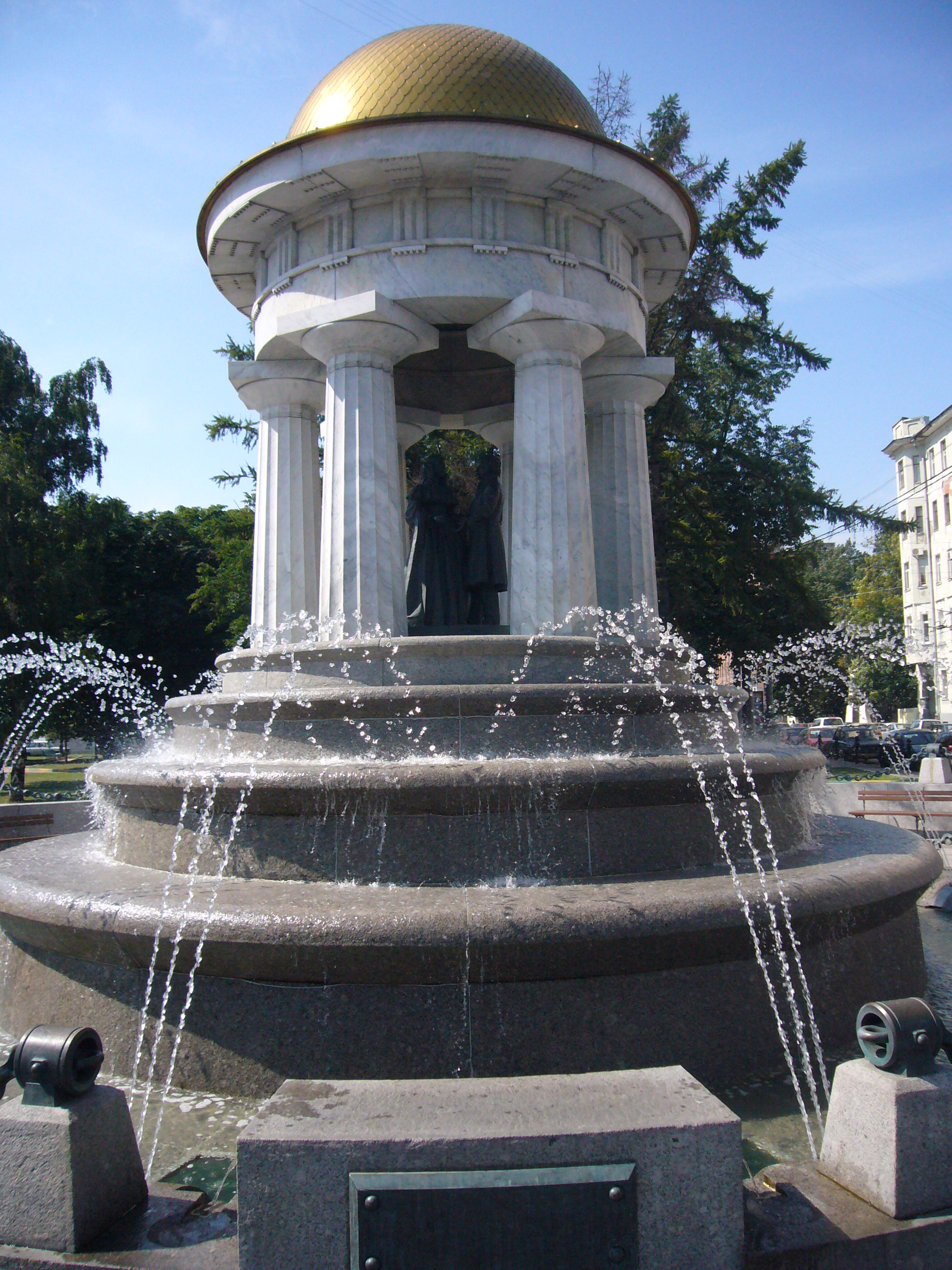
Natalia and Alexander Fountain at Nikitskiy Vorot, built to mark the 200th anniversary of birth of poet Alexander Pushkin, in front of the church where they were married. The fountain was dedicated June 6, 1999.

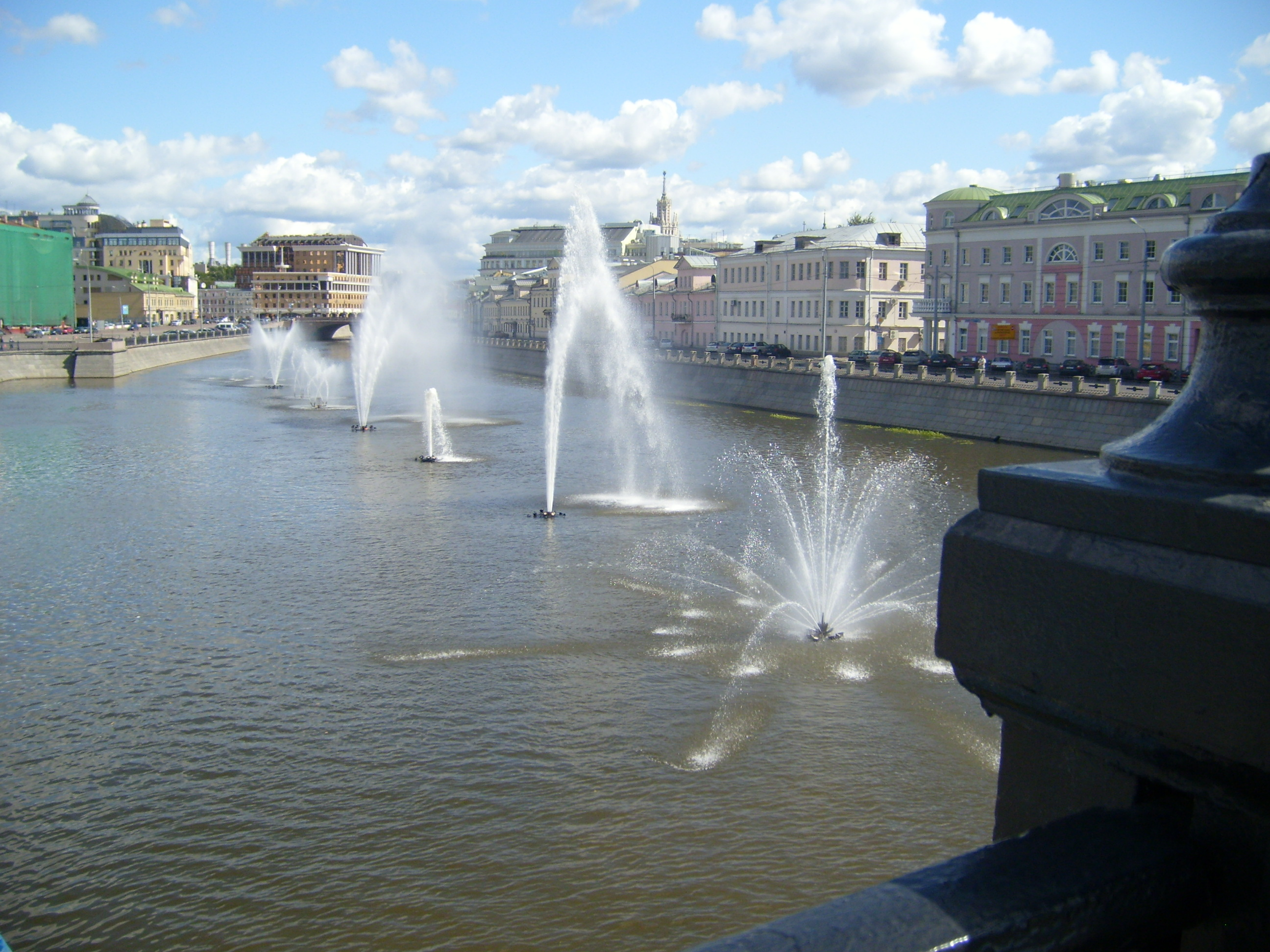
Fountains in the Vodootvodniy Canal (1996). seen from Luzhkov Bridge

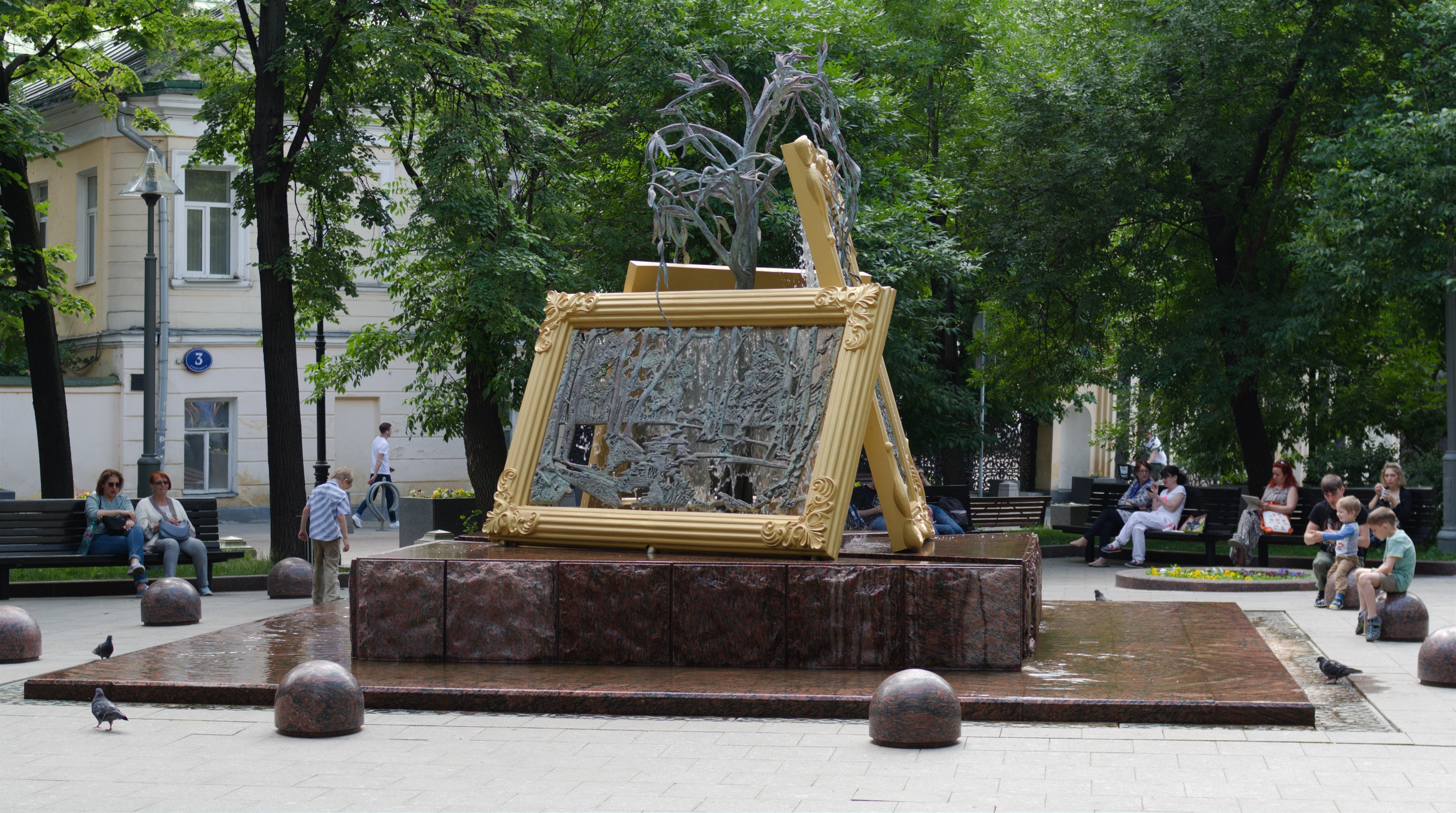
Fountain "Vdohnovenie" ("Inspiration") at the corner of Bolshoy Tolmachevsky Lane and Lavrushinsky Lane

== Bibliography ==
- Bourganov, Alexander, Alexander Bourganov. Beliy Gorod Publishers, Moscow 2001
- Schmidt, S.O. (Chief Editor), Encyclopedia Moskva, Moscow Scientific Publishing House 'Great Russian Encyclopedia', Moscow 1997.
