= Bourganov's House =

Russian state museum

Coordinates: 55.7465°N 37.5972°E

Bourganov's House (Russian: Дом Бурганова) is a Russian state museum named after its founder, the Russian sculptor Alexander Bourganov.

The museum was based on the private studio of the sculptor founded in 1984, in the historical area of Old Arbat in Moscow. It was officially unveiled as a State Museum in January 2001. Its main exposition is an outdoors collection of the works of Alexander Bourganov, Maria Bourganova and Igor Bourganov, and other works of the private collection of the family. It stretches between the Big Afanasievsky lane and Sivtsev Vrazhek lane. An addition, the museum hosts works of various Russian and West European artists.
