= Masha Moskalyova case =

April 2022 incident in Russia, resulting from an anti-war drawing

In April 2022, during the Russian invasion of Ukraine, an anti-war drawing by Maria Moskalyova (better known as Masha, a pet form of her given name), a sixth-grader in the Russian town of Yefremov, led to the political persecution of the girl and her single father Aleksey Moskalyov. The father was charged with discrediting the Russian military, and the girl was separated from her father and sent to a local orphanage. On 28 March 2023, a Russian court sentenced Aleksey to two years in prison. This is the first time in the Russian Federation that a court, after imprisoning a parent for political reasons, left the child without a legal guardian.

== Course of events ==
In April 2022, Maria Moskalyova (born 2009), a sixth-grade student at school No. 9 in Yefremov, drew an anti-war picture in her sketchbook during her drawing class. The picture depicted Russian missiles flying toward Ukrainian territory, where a woman stands in front of a child with an arm outstretched. The territories of two countries are marked by their respective flags: the flag of Ukraine is defaced with the Ukrainian national salute "Glory to Ukraine!" in Russian (Russian: Слава Украине!, romanized: Slava Ukraine!), while the Russian flag is defaced with the phrase "No to Putin [/] war!" (Russian: Нет Путину [/] войне!, romanized: Nyet Putinu [/] voynye!). On the preceding page, she had written, "Glory to Ukraine! Glory to the heroes[!]" (Russian: Героим слава[!], romanized: Heroim slava[!]). There was an immediate commotion at the school: the art teacher went to the principal, and she called the police. Employees of the Ministry of Internal Affairs were on duty at the exit from the school;Moskalyova quickly got her bearings and managed to escape home.

The next day, Masha and her father Aleksey Vladimirovich Moskalyov (born in 1968) were taken to the police station, where an administrative report was drawn up about the "discrediting" of the army, but the offense was not the child's drawing, but Aleksey Moskalyov's message on social networks Odnoklassniki, which he allegedly wrote. Later, FSB officers arrived at the school and tried to change the girl's mind to being supportive of the Russian invasion.

On December 30, 2022, the Moskalyovs' apartment was searched, during which property and all cash were seized, and Aleksey himself was detained and interrogated by the FSB. Five police cars, the Ministry of Emergency Situations and fire engines were on duty at Moskalyovs' house. During the interrogation, Aleksey was beaten, and also, according to him, he was demanded to confess to working for third parties. After interrogation, a criminal case was opened against Aleksey, and Masha was sent to a local child care community.

In January 2023, the Juvenile Commission of the city of Yefremov filed a lawsuit to limit the parental rights of both of Masha's parents.

On March 1, 2023, Aleksey was detained, and on March 2, he was sent under house arrest in the case of repeated "discrediting" of the army. Both Aleksey himself and human rights organizations were unable to contact Masha.

On March 27, the Yefremov interdistrict court, which was represented by judge Anton Vladyslavovich Malikov, considered the case in one day, and the next day sentenced Aleksey Moskalyov to two years in prison with a ban on using the Internet for 3 years and confiscation of his personal computer for the benefit of the state. The prosecutor in this court was Oleg Tymakov. In addition, the court decided to transfer Aleksey's daughter to the care of social services. According to municipal deputy Olga Podolskaya, a pro-war crowd was summoned to the court, and Moskalyov's support group was not allowed to enter the court. Aleksey himself escaped from house arrest and did not attend the announcement of the sentence.

On March 28, 2023, the human rights project "Memorial" recognized Aleksey Moskalyov as a political prisoner.

On March 29, 2023, Masha wrote to her father from the shelter: "I love you very much, and know that you are not to blame for anything, I am always there for you, and everything you do is right. <...> I'm begging you, just don't give up. Believe, hope and love. One day we will sit down at the table and remember all of this. I love you, I hope not, I know that you will not give up, you are strong, we are strong, we can do it, and I will pray for you and for us, dad". On the other hand, the girl wrote: "Love you, you are a hero. My hero".

On March 30, Aleksey Moskalyov was detained in Minsk. On April 1, Russian human rights activists from the organizations "Memorial" and "OVD-Info" asked the Council of Europe and the European Commission to help prevent the extradition of Aleksey Moskalyov to Russia. On April 4, Aleksey Moskalyov was found in the detention center in Zhodzina, Belarus. On April 12 he was extradited to Russia with his further location unknown.

On April 5, Olga Sitchikhina, the mother of Masha, who had not lived with her daughter for more than seven years, took her from the shelter.

On April 19, the lawsuit to limit the parental rights was withdrawn from the court.

On May 3, Aleksey Moskalyov was found in a detention center in Smolensk, where he told his lawyer that he was beaten during arrest in Belarus.

On February 19, 2024, the Tula Regional Court, following a retrial with a new psychological and linguistic examination, reduced the sentence to 1 year and 10 months in a general regime colony with a ban on website administration for 2 years.

On October 15, 2024, Alexei Moskalev was released.

== The essence of the criminal charge ==
Despite the fact that the persecution began with the anti-war drawing of Masha Moskalyova, the first administrative protocol in April 2022 for "discrediting" the Russian army was drawn up due to a message on the Odnoklassniki social network, which, according to the law enforcement authorities, was written by Aleksey Moskalyov. On March 28, 2023, Aleksey was sentenced to prison in a criminal case for repeatedly "discrediting" the army.

Aleksey himself claims that he did not write these messages, and his page on social networks could have been hacked.

Maria's teachers, who acted as witnesses for the prosecution, could not recall the content of the messages, only indicated that "the essence is one and the same - defamatory and discrediting." Another witness—an employee of the company that connected the Internet in Moskalyov's apartment—confirmed that Aleksey's computer, which was seized during the search, was used to access his social media page.

== Reactions ==
The representative of the European Commission, Peter Stano, compared the persecution of Aleksey Moskalyov with the policies of Joseph Stalin and called on Russia to respect its own constitution "instead of punishing children and parents for political reasons".

== Aftermath ==
Due to multiple threats from FSB and police surveillance, the family fled Russia in October 2024, making their way to Armenia. From Armenia, Moskalyovs applied for humanitarian visas under Section 22, Sentence 2 of the German Residence Act. In July 2025, however, German Federal Ministry of the Interior announced suspension of humanitarian admission procedures. In March 2026 the Moskalyovs arrived in France after being granted humanitarian visas there.

== See also ==
- Mikhail Simonov case
