= Mount Ephraim (disambiguation) =

Mount Ephraim can refer to:

- Mount Ephraim, the historical name for a district in Israel
- Mount Ephraim, Ohio, an unincorporated community in Noble County, Ohio, United States
- Mount Ephraim, Massachusetts, former name for Richmond, Berkshire County, Massachusetts, United States before it was incorporated in 1765
- Mount Ephraim, New Jersey, a borough in Camden County, New Jersey, United States
- Mount Ephraim (Vermont), a mountain in Springfield, Vermont, United States
- Mount Ephraim Gardens, historic house and gardens, near Faversham, United Kingdom
- Mount Ephraim, Streatham Hill, London, a narrow approach of two streets with gardens on the western flank of the Norwood Ridge
