= Yevgeni Yefremov =

Yevgeni Yefremov is the name of:

- Yevgeni Borisovich Yefremov (born 1970), retired Russian footballer
- Yevgeni Gennadyevich Yefremov (born 1979), Russian footballer
