= FC Biolog-Novokubansk =

Russian football club

- Full name: Football Club Biolog-Novokubansk
- Founded: 1995; 31 years ago
- Dissolved: 2025; 1 year ago
- Ground: Progress Stadium, Progress, Russia
- Capacity: 2,300
- Chairman: Aleksandr Maslov
- Manager: Dmitry Yefremov
- 2024: Russian Second League, Division B, Group 1, 14th
Home colours	Away colours

FC Biolog-Novokubansk (Russian: «ФК Биолог-Новокубанск») was a Russian football team from Progress settlement of Novokubansky District, founded in 1995. Since 2011 it played in the third-level Russian Second League. From the 2023 season, it moved to the new fourth-tier Russian Second League Division B. Previously it played in the Russian Amateur Championship and the Krasnodar Krai Championship. The club was dissolved in early 2025.
