= Mikhail Simonov case =

Russian human rights case

On March 30, 2023, 63-year-old pensioner Mikhail Simonov was convicted due to two comments under other people's posts in the Russian social network VKontakte. Mikhail Simonov Alexei was accused of discrediting the Russian army during Russia's invasion of Ukraine. He received seven years in prison.

== Course of events ==
Mikhail Simonov was born around 1960 in Voronezh, and in recent years he worked as the director of a restaurant car and lived in Belarus.

In March 2022, Mikhail Simonov wrote two comments to other people's posts: "Killing children and women, we sing songs on Channel One. We, Russia, have become godless. Forgive us, Lord!" and "Russian pilots bomb children".

On November 9, 2022, officers of the authorities came with an angle grinder to the apartment where Mikhail Simonov was staying with his friends.

The first time they couldn't open a case, and the second time too (the case was returned "due to the absence of a crime", but then handed over to another employee). In December, Simonov's term in pretrial detention was extended, and the following was noted about his health at the time: "Elderly Simonov can't hear well and speaks with difficulty, and in addition, he told the court that he has "prostatitis and a lot of various ailments." The state of health of the detainee did not affect the court's decision, since, according to the judge, the defendant is a danger to society and can hide from the city».

On March 30, 2023, a verdict was handed down under Article 207.3 of the Criminal Code. The pensioner received seven years in prison. The verdict was handed down in the Tymyryazevsky District Court of Moscow.

In the last word, Mikhail Simonov specified that he was born and raised in the family of a veteran of the Great Patriotic War, and his mother survived the blockade of Leningrad, and "there simply could not be any negative attitude [to the army] in him".

The human rights project "Memorial" recognized Mikhail Simonov as a political prisoner.

== The essence of the criminal charge ==
The case against Simonov includes the testimony of two witnesses, Anna Gell and Natalya Plotnikova, who, as Mediazona writes, "not knowing each other, one day they "accidentally came across" Mikhail Simonov's posts "discrediting the Supreme Court of the Russian Federation" and, without consulting one another, decided to turn to B. R. Minasov, the senior investigator of the SC on particularly important cases." Anna Gell stated at the court that it annoys her when people publicly speak out "against the government and the state" and "a solid lump of liberalism" on social networks. She even shed a tear and noted that she does not believe in the crimes committed by the Russian army in Ukraine. The fault of the citizen of the Russian Federation lies in the fact that he dared to write two comments on the VKontakte social network: "Killing children and women, we sing songs on Channel One. We, Russia, have become godless. Forgive us, Lord!" and "Russian pilots bomb children". The Russian court considered that the suspect, with his comments on the social network, "misled the readers regarding the legality of the actions of the Russian armed forces, undermined their authority and discredited them, since, according to the Ministry of Defense of the Russian Federation, the information about the killings of civilians by the Russian military does not correspond to reality".

== See also ==
- Krasovsky case
- Masha Moskalyova case
