= Ephraim (surname) =

Ephraim is a surname. Notable people with the surname include:

- Alonzo Ephraim (born 1981), American football player
- Hogan Ephraim (born 1988), English football player
- Molly Ephraim (born 1986), American actress
- Moses Ephraim (1620–1688), Dutch banker
- Olaf Ephraim (born 1965), Dutch banker and politician
- Veitel Heine Ephraim (1703-1775), Prussian jeweller, mintmaster and entrepreneur
