= Aleksandr Yefremov =

Aleksandr Yefremov may refer to:

- Aleksandr Yefremov (politician) (1904–1951), Soviet politician, head of Moscow from 1938 to 1939
- Alexander P. Yefremov, Russian physicist

== See also ==
- Oleksandr Yefremov, Ukrainian politician sometimes referred to as Aleksandr Yefremov
