= Yefremov air base =

Airbase in Tula Oblast, Russia

Yefremov Efremov
- Yefremov, Tula Oblast in Russia

Site information
- Type: Air Base
- Owner: Ministry of Defence
- Operator: Russian Air Force

Location
- Shown within Tula Oblast Yefremov (Russia)
- Coordinates: 53°06′48″N 038°14′42″E

Site history
- Built: 1950
- In use: 1950 - 1998

Airfield information
- Identifiers: ICAO: XUWE
- Elevation: 216 metres (709 ft) AMSL
Runways
Direction	Length and surface
18/36	2,500 metres (8,202 ft) Concrete

Yefremov was a military air base in Tula Oblast, Russia during the 20th century. It is located 9 km east of the town of the same name. It largely served the interceptor air defense role for the Soviet Air Defence Forces. The host unit was the 191 IAP (191st Fighter Aviation Regiment).

The regiment first used the Mikoyan-Gurevich MiG-15 (NATO: Fagot) between 1950 and 1955, then used the Mikoyan-Gurevich MiG-17F (NATO: Fresco) between 1955 and 1961. It then operated the Sukhoi Su-9 (NATO: Fishpot) between 1961 and 1965. The regiment replaced it in 1965 with the Sukhoi Su-11 (NATO: Fishpot-C) then moved to the Mikoyan-Gurevich MiG-23P (NATO: Flogger-G).

Following the dissolution of the Soviet Union, the Russian Air Force assigned the 239th Independent Guards Helicopter Regiment to Yefremov between 1994 and 1998 with the Mil Mi-24 (NATO: Hind).

The base was reportedly closed in 1998 and the aviation regiment was disbanded.
