= Efraim Margolin =

Efraim Margoli
- Occupations: Businessman; Philanthropist
- Known for: Founder

Efraim Margolin(10/16/1926 - 03/10/2024) was an Israeli-American businessman and philanthropist, founder of Margolin Consultants Inc, an employment and Merger and Acquisitions Company in New York City. He is a native of Ukraine, who immigrated to Palestine when he was a small child. Growing up with a father who was a local leader of the Haganah Jewish Underground Militia, he became one of the young engineers during World War II working for the Anglo-Iranian Oil Company in Iran and later, as Manager in Bahrain Island constructing an airport for the British Air Force. Later he came to America for advanced engineering studies at Columbia University marrying his American sweetheart and ended up serving as a secret agent for the Mossad, the Israeli Undercover Agency, outfitting torpedo boats for the Israeli Navy. After the 1948 War, he was in charge of building the New City of Beer Sheva in the Negev Desert.

Returning to New York, and starting from scratch, he became active in many organizations promoting trade and cultural exchanges with Israel. He and Florence are founders of the City of Tel Aviv Foundation, City of Eilat, Technion Israel Institute of Technology, American Israeli Opera, The Boston Opera and founding benefactors of 40,000 trees in the Jewish National Fund “Margolin Peace Forest” in Kiryat Gat between Jerusalem and Beer Sheva. They live in Manhattan but return to Israel frequently.
