= Moses Ephraim =

Dutch banker

Moses Ephraim (1620/1625 – before 1688) was a Dutch banker, perhaps born in present-day Germany. He was the ancestor of the Dutch Ephraim and Tilanus families and, according to oral family history, a war hero during the Dutch Independence War.

In 1646, Frederik Hendrik, Prince of Orange and, amongst much else, Count of Buren, assigned Moses to be the banker in the city of Buren in Gelderland, for a period of six years. He was reassigned twice and remained at this position until 1664, during which time he was also the cosher butcher. In 1671 he still lived in Buren, but by January 27, 1688, his wife "Beliken" was noted to be a widow in the same town.

In 1876, Jechiël Ephraim, a descendant of Moses' son Ephraim Moses (c. 1650–1731) who in 1678 had moved to nearby Tiel and became a very successful banker, published a story that got much press relating that ancestor Moses Ephraim was honourably known as Tilanus ("of Tiel") for his successful strategy during a Spanish siege of Tiel. Moses would have suggested that the citizens place their metal chimney pots round the city walls (they only had two cannons) to scare away the marauding Spanish siege-makers. Unfortunately, the Spanish are not known to have besieged Tiel in the years Moses Ephraim could have participated; instead, the French took both Tiel and Buren in 1672, under Marshall Turenne, but the citizens opened the gate for them, anticipating that they could not resist their forces. The name "Tilanus" was first used by Ephraim Moses' youngest son Christiaan Lammert Tilanus (1705–1782), presumably, as so many, for his place of birth.

Descendants settled throughout the Netherlands and Indonesia, creating a patrician dynasty and eventually making the family fortune through industry. In 1869, a descendant established the Jansen & Tilanus underwear factory near Almelo.

== Sources ==
- Harro de Beus, 350 jaar geschiedenis van het geslacht Ephraim 1646-1996, Assen, 1996. ISBN 90-9011704-0 (Dutch)
