= Yefremovsky (rural locality) =

Yefremovsky (Russian: Ефремовский; masculine), Yefremovskaya (Ефремовская; feminine), or Yefremovskoye (Ефремовское; neuter) is the name of several rural localities in Russia:

- Yefremovsky, Rostov Oblast, a khutor in Malokirsanovskoye Rural Settlement of Matveyevo-Kurgansky District of Rostov Oblast
- Yefremovsky, Volgograd Oblast, a khutor in Perelazovsky Selsoviet of Kletsky District of Volgograd Oblast
- Yefremovskaya, Arkhangelsk Oblast, a village in Zabelinsky Selsoviet of Kotlassky District of Arkhangelsk Oblast
- Yefremovskaya, Moscow Oblast, a village under the administrative jurisdiction of the Town of Yegoryevsk in Yegoryevsky District of Moscow Oblast
- Yefremovskaya, Vologda Oblast, a village in Pechengsky Selsoviet of Kirillovsky District of Vologda Oblast
