= Efraim Taburi =

Israeli politician (1900–1957)

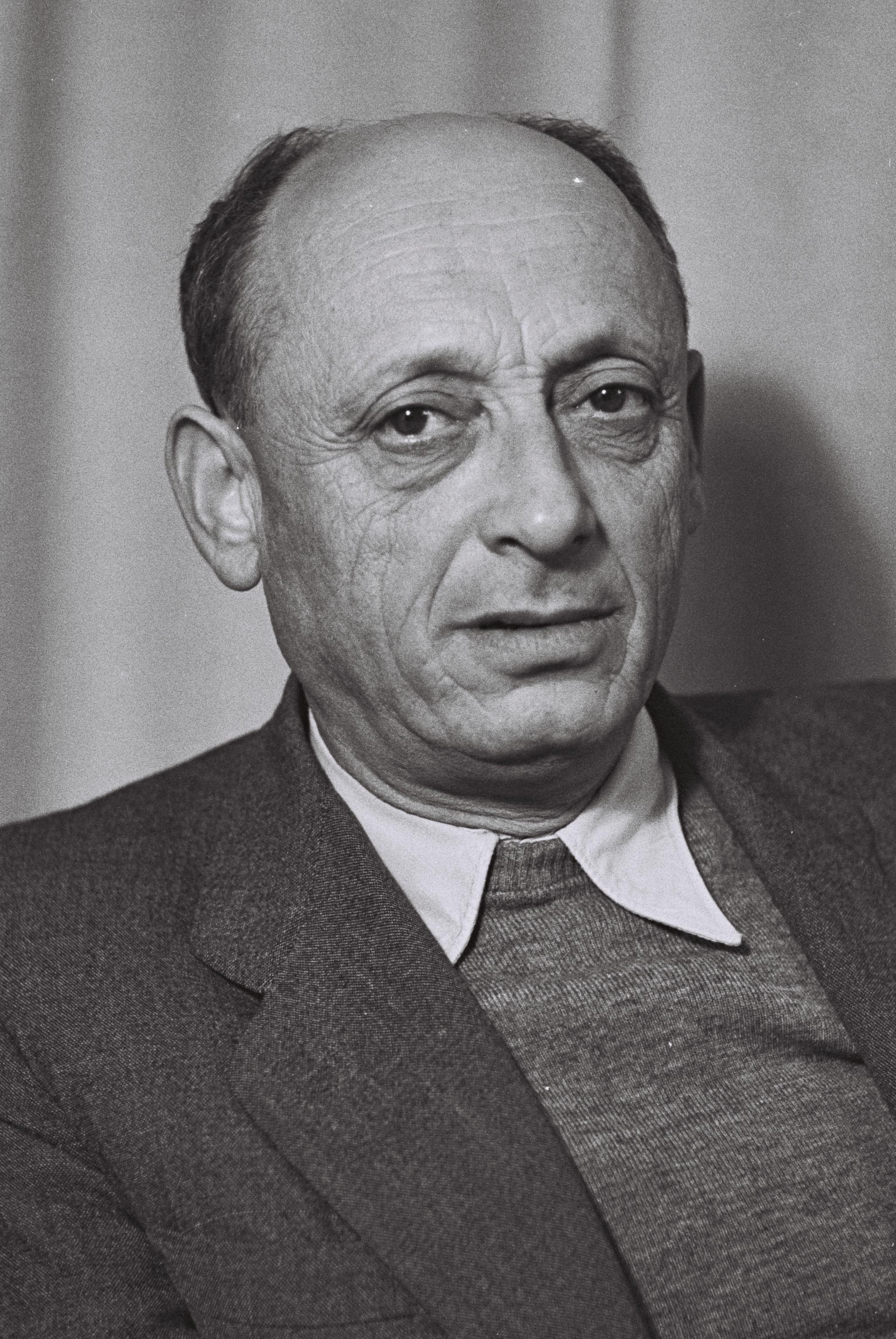
- Taburi in 1951

Faction represented in the Knesset
- 1949–1955: Mapai

Personal details
- Born: 5 September 1900 Tulchyn, Russian Empire
- Died: 7 April 1957 (aged 56)

Efraim Taburi (Hebrew: אפרים תבורי; 5 September 1900 – 7 April 1957) was a Zionist activist and politician.

== Biography ==
Born Efraim Popik in Tulchyn in the Russian Empire (today in Ukraine), Taburi was a member of Socialist Zionist movements. He was arrested by the Soviet authorities, and in 1924 emigrated to Mandatory Palestine, where he worked for Tel Aviv city council. In 1927 he became secretary of the Tel Aviv branch of Ahdut HaAvoda and in 1929 became a member of the Tel Aviv Workers Council. He also served as a member of the Assembly of Representatives.

In 1949 he was elected to the first Knesset on the Mapai list. He was re-elected in 1951, but lost his seat in the 1955 elections. He died in 1957 at the age of 56.
