= Efrem, Bulgaria =

Efrem
- Village
- Location within Bulgaria
- Coordinates: 41°43′N 25°55′E
- Country: Bulgaria
- Province: Haskovo Province
- Municipality: Madzharovo
- Time zone: UTC+2 (EET)
  - Summer (DST): UTC+3 (EEST)

Efrem is a village in the municipality of Madzharovo, in Haskovo Province, in southern Bulgaria.

== History ==
In the past, Efrem (known until 1906 as Urumkioy) was inhabited by Greek population. The local Greeks emigrated to Greece (mainly to the villages of Ormenio and Ptelea in Evros prefecture). In their houses Bulgarian refugees from Western Thrace (now in Greece) and Asia Minor (now in Turkey) were accommodated.
