= Ephraim Lederer =

American lawyer (1862–1925)

Ephraim Lederer (January 24, 1862 – September 11, 1925) was a Jewish-American lawyer from Pennsylvania.

== Life ==
Lederer was born on January 24, 1862, in Philadelphia, Pennsylvania, the son of Leopold Lederer and Fannie Weyl. His father immigrated to America from Meseritz, the Grand Duchy of Posen, while his mother immigrated Petchau, Bohemia.

Lederer attended Philadelphia public schools and graduated from the Central High School when he was sixteen. He then studied law in the office of Judge F. Amedee Bregy and took a two-year course in the University of Pennsylvania Law School. He was admitted to the bar in 1883. In 1913, President Woodrow Wilson appointed him Collector of Internal Revenue for the Eastern District of Pennsylvania. He resigned from the office in 1921 to resume his private law practice. A prominent Democrat, he became an assistant in the office of Sheriff Charles F. Krumbhaar in 1888 and served as first vice-president of the Democratic Club of Philadelphia.

Lederer was vice-president and secretary of the Young Men's Hebrew Association, director and assistant secretary of the Jewish Publication Society of America. He was associate editor of The Jewish Exponent from 1901 to 1904 and wrote a number of lectures and essays on Jewish subjects that were published in Jewish journals. He continued to write for The Jewish Exponent from 1905 to 1925. In 1911, he was appointed chairman of the education committee of the Philadelphia Kehillah. He was also a trustee of the Jewish Publication Society, president of the board of trustees of Gratz College, the Philadelphia secretary of the Jewish Theological Seminary of America for over thirty-five years, secretary and board of governors member of Dropsie College, director and solicitor of the Jewish Hospital Association of Philadelphia for almost forty years, first committee chairman of the Lucien Moss Home for Incurables, a trustee of the Rothschild Memorial (Beth-El) Congregation, a director of the Philadelphia branch of the Alliance Israélite Universelle, vice-president of the Hebrew Education Society, and a member of the Philadelphia Bar Association and the American Jewish Committee. He attended the Congregation Mikveh Israel.

In 1901, Lederer married Grace Newhouse. Grace was teacher, principal, and president of the Hebrew Sunday School Society. She was also president of the Female Hebrew Benevolent Society of Philadelphia, an honorary director of the Federation of Jewish Charities and the Jewish Aid Society, treasurer of the Women's Democratic Luncheon Club, and editor of the Pennsylvania Democratic women publication Survey.

Lederer died from a heart attack on September 11, 1925.
