= Mikhail Yefremov =

Mikhail Yefremov may refer to:

- Mikhail Yefremov (actor) (born 1963), Soviet and Russian actor
- Mikhail Yefremov (military commander) (1897–1942), Soviet military commander
- Mikhail Yefremov (politician) (1911–2000), Soviet politician and diplomat
