= Efren =

Efren or Efrén is a given name. Notable people with the name include:

- Efrén Echeverría (born 1932), musician guitarist, composer, and compiler from Paraguay
- Efrén Pérez Rivera (born 1929), former college professor and noted Puerto Rican environmentalist leader
- Efrén Rebolledo (1877–1929), Mexican poet and diplomat
- Efrén Vázquez (born 1986), Spanish Grand Prix motorcycle road racer in the 250 cc World Championship riding a Derbi
- Efren de la Cruz (footballer) (born 1989), Ecuadorian footballer who plays for LDU Quito
- Efren Herrera (born 1951), former American football place-kicker and wide receiver in the National Football League
- Efren Peñaflorida (born 1981), teacher and social worker in the Philippines
- Efren Ramirez (born 1973), American actor
- Efren Reyes (born 1954), Filipino professional pool player from Angeles City and a two-time world champion
- Efren Reyes Jr. (born 1962), Filipino actor
- Efren Saldivar (born 1969), American serial killer who murdered patients while working as a respiratory therapist
- Efren Torres (born 1943), former a Mexican boxer, who was world champion in the Flyweight division

== See also ==
- Sa Paraiso ni Efren (English: Efren's Paradise), a film that tackles interwoven four-way emotional entanglements
