= Alexander Bourganov =

Russian sculptor

- Александр Николаевич Бурганов
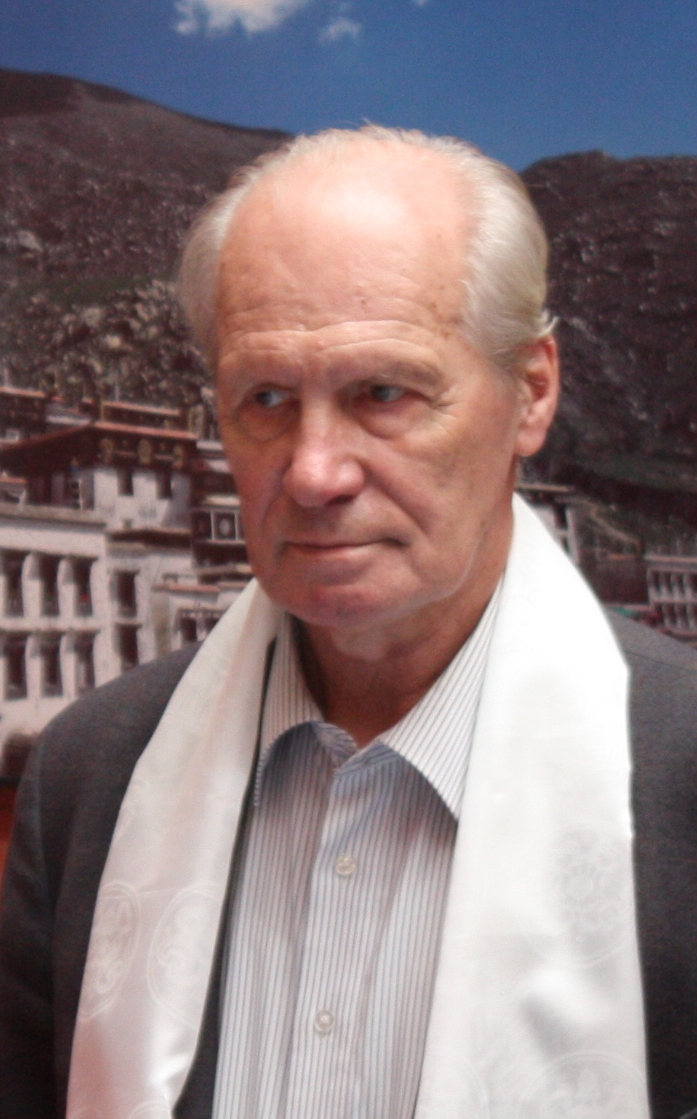
- Born: March 20, 1935 (age 91); Baku, USSR
- Education: Stroganov Moscow State Academy of Arts and Industry
- Occupation: sculptor

Alexander Nikolayevich Bourganov (Russian: Алекса́ндр Никола́евич Бурга́нов; Born 1935) is a Russian sculptor, a National Artist of Russia, and a member of the Russian Academy of Fine Arts.

== Life and career ==
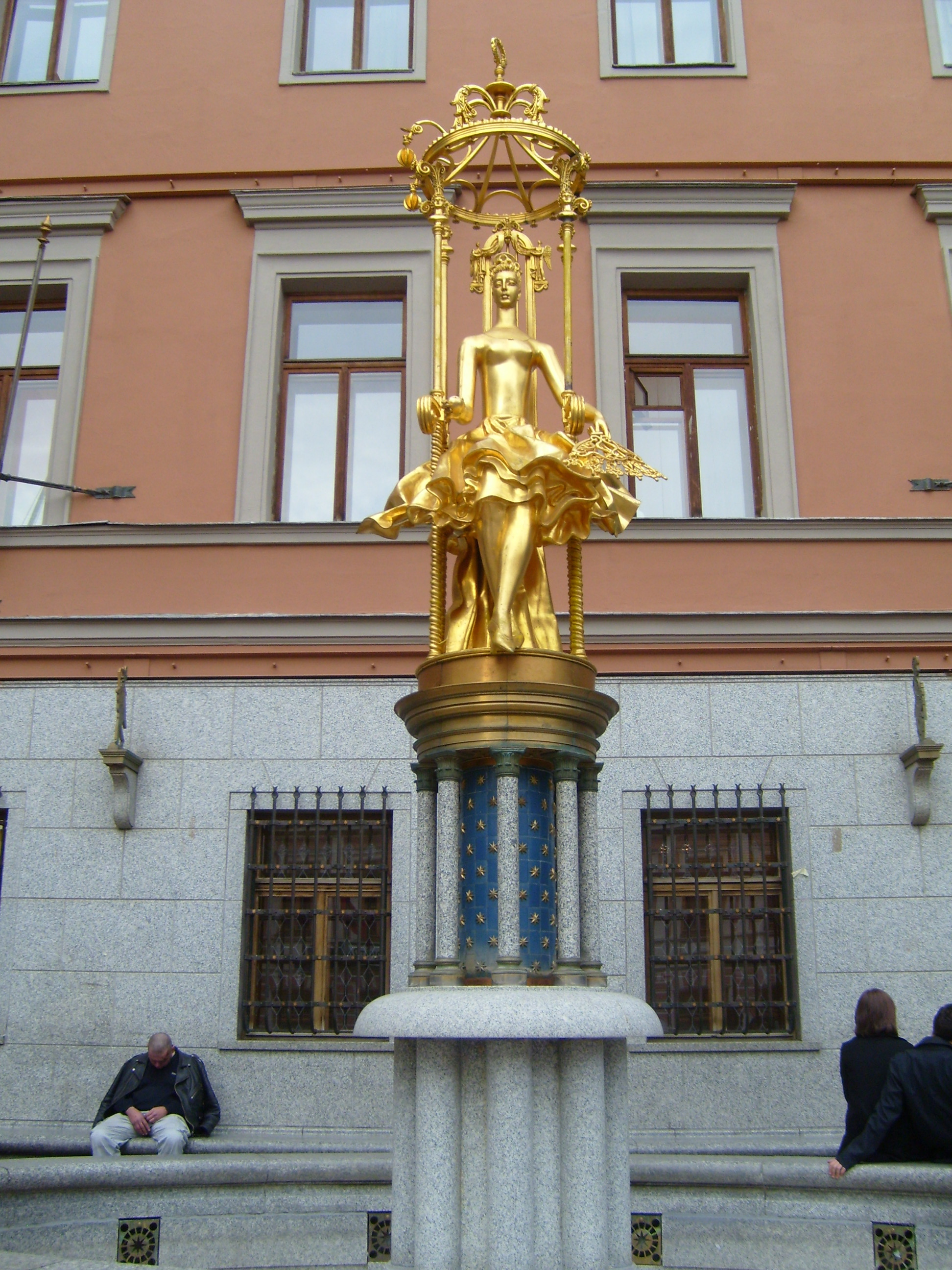
Princess Turandot Fountain, Old Arbat Street, Moscow (1997)

His recent works include a monument to Alexander Pushkin located at George Washington University in Washington DC (2000); a statue of John Quincy Adams, the first U.S. Ambassador to Russia and later President of the United States, located in front of the U.S. Embassy in Moscow (2008); and a statue of poet Walt Whitman located on the campus of Moscow State University (2009). In 2001 his studio in Moscow was given the status of a State Museum, known as Bourganov's House. His other works around Moscow include a series of fountains and statues on Ukrainsky Boulvar, near the Hotel Ukraine.

Bourganov was born in Baku, Azerbaijan and graduated from Moscow State Artistic and Industrial College (now Stroganov University). He received a PhD. in art history.

In March 2014 he signed a letter in support of the position of the President of Russia Vladimir Putin on Russia's military intervention in Ukraine.

== Chronology of the principal sculptural works of Alexander Bourganov ==
- Monument commemorating the 400th birthday of the city of Oryol (1966)
- "Memories of an old worker" (1968)
- Decorative relief-emblem on the Central House of Filmmakers in Moscow (1969)
- Monument "Friendship of Peoples: in honor of the 400th anniversary of the union of Udmurtia and Russia (1972)
- "Victory" statue at the Central House of Artists, Moscow (1978)
- "War and Peace", Germany (1980)
- "Yuri Gagarin, First Man in Space", Expo 86, Canada (1986)
- Portraits in bas-relief of Russian artists Ilya Repin, Vasily Surikov, Karl Bryullov, Sergey Konenkov, Ivanov and Shishkin at the Tretyakovskaya Station of the Moscow Metro (1986)
- Composition with nine figures, "War and Peace" (1987)
- Monument to Sophia Perovskaya, Kaluga (1987)
- Portrait of Ivan Tsvetaev for the Pushkin Museum, Moscow (1992)
- Monument to Soviet Soldiers killed in Belgium during the Second World War (1990–92)
- Monument to the poet Mikhail Lermontov, Moscow (1994)
- Monument to the writer Ivan Bunin, Voronezh (1995)
- Fountain "Princess Turandot" on Old Arbat Street (1997)
- Monument to Alexander Pushkin and Natalia Goncharova on Old Arbat Street (1999)
- Monument to Alexander Pushkin at George Washington University in Washington D.C. (2000)
- Gallery "Legendary People"; bust of great figure in world culture: Andrei Tarkovsky, Joseph Brodsky; Rudolf Nureyev, Ivan Bunin, G. Fogeler. (2000–2005).
- "The Golden Lion." (2002)
- Sculptural ensemble on Ukrainsky Boulvar in Moscow: "Allegory of Air"; "Allegory of Water"; "Forests of Ukraine"; "Fountain "Youth"; *Decorative sculpture "Friendship"; monument to E.F. Gnesina. (2005)
- Memorial plaque to S. Richter, Moscow (2005).
- Decorative bas-reliefs on the building of the Bogoliubov Library, Moscow (2005).
- Sculptural ensemble "Ecology" in the Square on Sivtsev Vrazhye (2005).
- Sculptural park 'Understanding knowledge" on the square in front of the film theater Brest in Moscow. (2005).
- Statue of John Quincy Adams in front of the U.S. Embassy, Moscow (2008).
- Statue of Walt Whitman in front of the Humanities Faculty Building at Moscow State University (2009).
- Sculpture of Alexander Pushkin at the Sheremetyevo International Airport (2019).
