= Yefremovsky District =

Yefremovsky District Ефремовский район (Russian)
- District
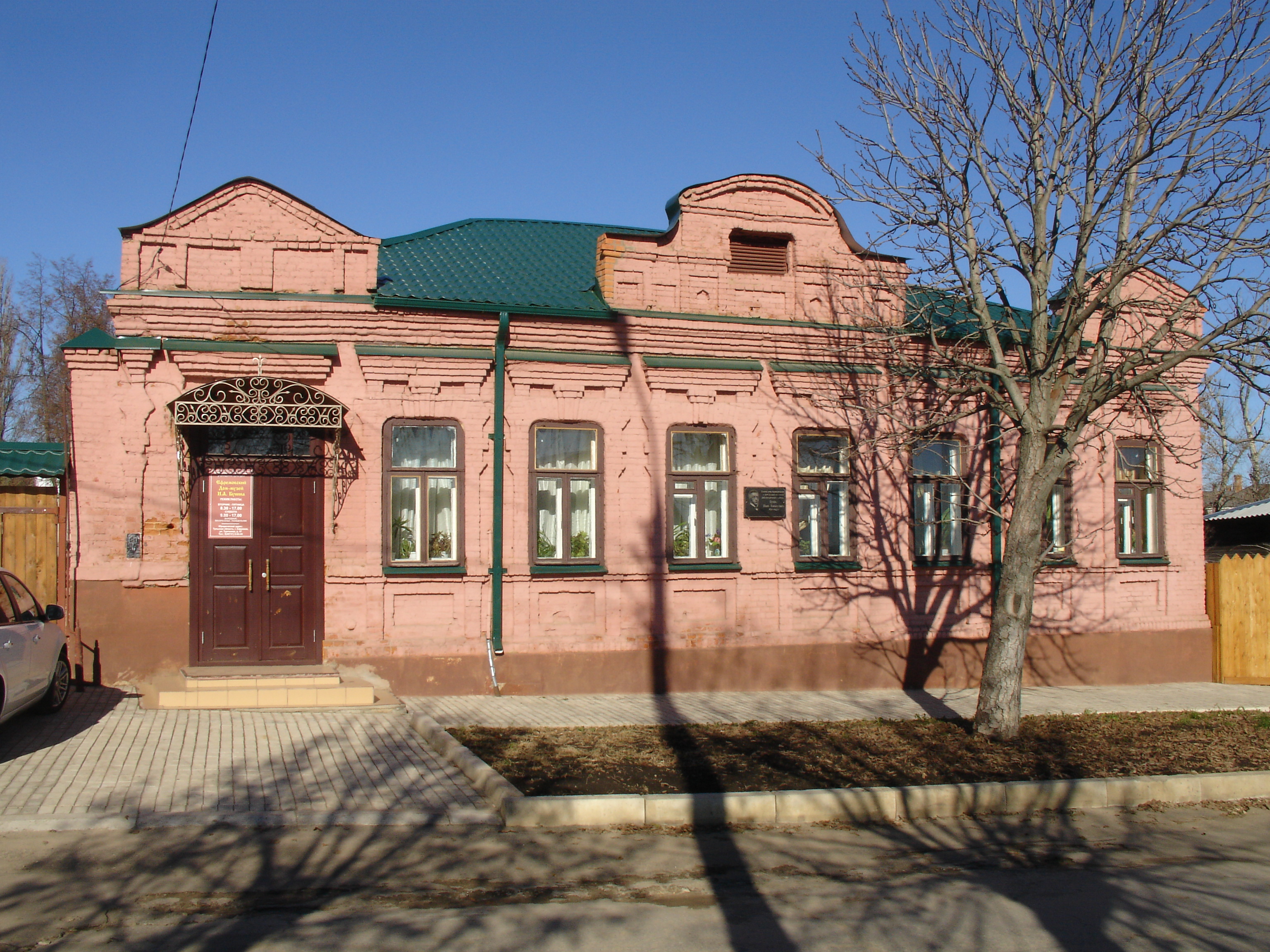
- Ivan Bunin museum in Yefremov, Yefremovsky District

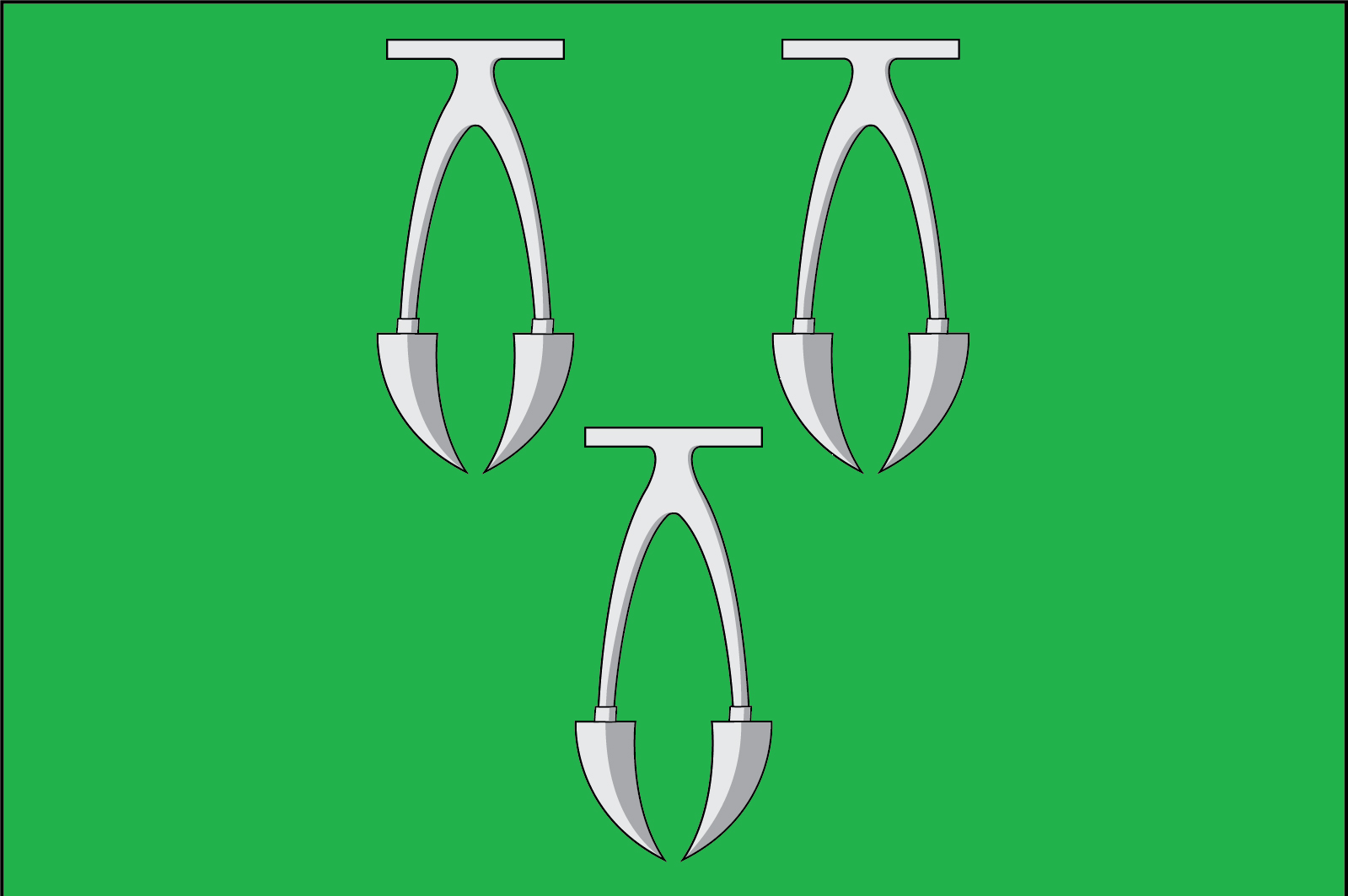
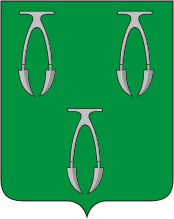
- Flag Coat of arms
- Location of Yefremovsky District in Tula Oblast
- Coordinates: 53°08′38″N 38°06′05″E
- Country: Russia
- Federal subject: Tula Oblast
- Established: 24 July 1924
- Administrative center: Yefremov

Area
  - Total: 1,649 km^{2} (637 sq mi)

Population (2010 Census)
  - Total: 64,227
  - Density: 38.95/km^{2} (100.9/sq mi)
  - Urban: 65.9%
  - Rural: 34.1%

Administrative structure
  - Administrative divisions: 1 Towns under district jurisdiction, 24 Rural okrugs
  - Inhabited localities: 1 cities/towns, 206 rural localities

Municipal structure
  - Municipally incorporated as: Yefremov Urban Okrug
- Time zone: UTC+3 (MSK)
- OKTMO ID: 70714000

Yefremovsky District (Russian: Ефре́мовский райо́н) is an administrative district (raion), one of the twenty-three in Tula Oblast, Russia. As a municipal division, it is incorporated as Yefremov Urban Okrug. It is located in the southeast of the oblast. The area of the district is 1,649 square kilometers (637 sq mi). Its administrative center is the town of Yefremov. Population: 64,227 (2010 Census); 23,436 (2002 census); 25,057 (1989 Soviet census). The population of Yefremov accounts for 65.9% of the district's total population.
