= Yefremov (town) =

Town in Tula Oblast, Russia

Yefremov Ефремов
- Town
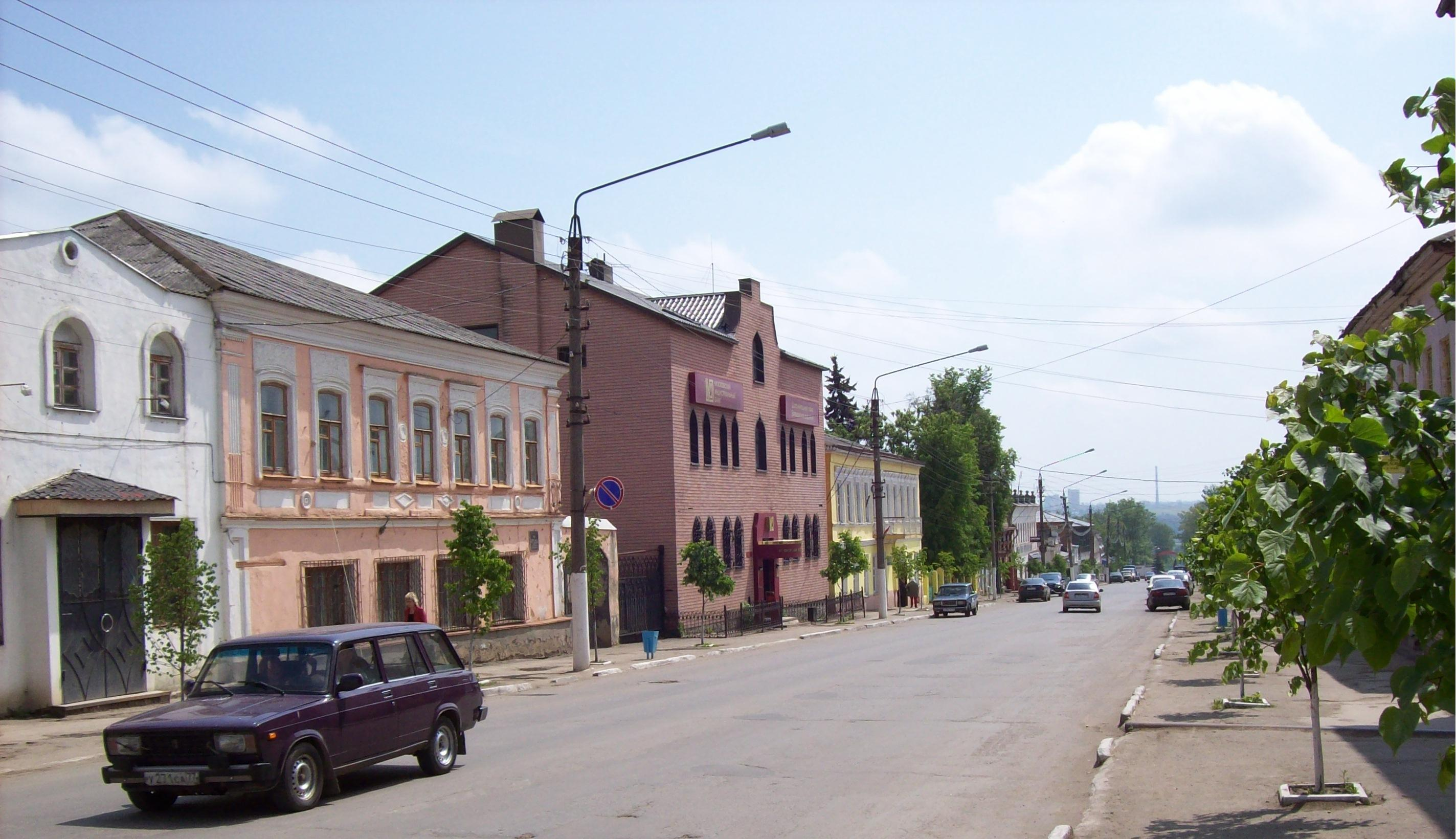
- Sverdlova Street in central Yefremov

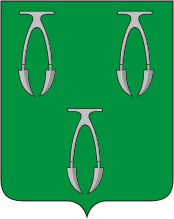
- Coat of arms
- Interactive map of Yefremov
- Location of Yefremov Yefremov (Tula Oblast)
- Coordinates: 53°09′N 38°07′E
- Country: Russia
- Federal subject: Tula Oblast
- Administrative district: Yefremovsky District
- Town under district jurisdictionSelsoviet: Yefremov
- Founded: 1637
- Town status since: 1777
- Elevation: 170 m (560 ft)

Population (2010 Census)
  - Total: 42,350
  - Estimate (2025): 34,965 (−17.4%)

Administrative status
  - Capital of: Yefremovsky District

Municipal status
  - Urban okrug: Yefremov Urban Okrug
  - Capital of: Yefremov Urban Okrug
- Time zone: UTC+3 (MSK)
- Postal codes: 301840–301848, 301859
- OKTMO ID: 70714000001

Yefremov (Russian: Ефре́мов, Russian pronunciation: [jɪˈfrʲeməf]) is a town and the administrative center of Yefremovsky District in Tula Oblast, Russia, located on the Krasivaya Mecha River (Don's tributary), 149 kilometers (93 mi) south of Tula, the administrative center of the oblast. Population: 42,350 (2010 census); 47,256 (2002 census); 56,740 (1989 Soviet census).

== History ==
It was founded in 1637 as a fortress defending the southern borders of the Tsardom of Russia. It was granted town status in 1777.

Yefremov was occupied by the German Army briefly during World War II. The occupation lasted from November 23 to December 13, 1941.

A Soviet Air Force facility, Yefremov air base, was constructed east of the town during the Cold War.

In April 2022, a girl named Maria Moskalyova and her father were prosecuted for her anti-war drawing in the Masha Moskalyova case.

== Administrative and municipal status ==
Within the framework of administrative divisions, Yefremov serves as the administrative centre of Yefremovsky District and is incorporated within it as a town under district jurisdiction. As a municipal division, the town of Yefremov, together with 206 rural localities in Yefremovsky District, is incorporated as Yefremov Urban Okrug.

== Economy ==
Since 1933 the Yefremovskaya CHP has been operating, which supplies industrial enterprises with electricity and the city with heat.

Yefremov is a diversified industrial city, its economy was based on three chemical plants:

- Yefremov Synthetic Rubber Plant (JSC "EZSK") (synthetic rubber);
- Yefremov Biochemical Plant (feed additives);
- Yefremov Chemical Plant (JSC Shchekinoazot, Yefremov branch) (sulfuric acid).

As of 2011, it the Cargill plant was Russia's largest molasses producer:

- Glucose-treacle combine "Yefremovsky" (molasses and syrups, starches, gluten, vegetable oils, fats and their substitutes, barley malt, compound feeds, premixes, semi-finished products from poultry meat). As of 2011, it was a division of Cargill, being renamed Cargill LLC in July.

There are also a number of food industry enterprises in the city (bakery, dairy plant, etc.) working for the local market.

== Sister city ==
- Liptovský Mikuláš, Slovakia
