= Ephrem Mtsire =

11th century Georgian monk, philosopher and philologist

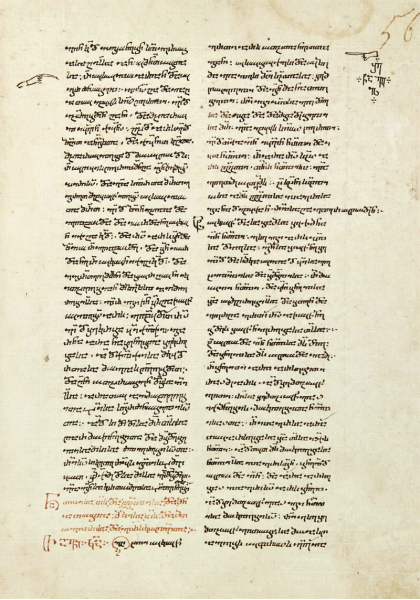
A 12th-century manuscript of Ephrem Mtsire's translation of "the Orthodox Faith" by John of Damascus.

Ephrem Mtsire or Ephraim the Lesser (Georgian: ეფრემ მცირე) (died c. 1101/3) was a Georgian monk at Antioch, theologian and translator of patristic literature from Greek.

Information as to Ephrem’s life is scarce. Early in life he received a thorough Hellenic education presumably in Constantinople, where his purported father Vache Karich'isdze, a Georgian nobleman from Tao, had moved to in 1027. Ephrem then became a monk at the Black Mountain near Antioch, which was populated by a vibrant Georgian monastic community of around 70 monks. Later in his life, c. 1091, Ephrem became a hegumen of the Kastana monastery, probably at the Castalia spring in Daphne, outside Antioch.

Ephrem’s hellenophile translational technique proved to be fundamental for later Georgian literature. He was the first to introduce literal rendering into Georgian, and made scholia and lexica familiar to Georgian readers. Some of his notable translations are the works by Pseudo-Dionysius the Areopagite, Basil of Caesarea, Ephrem the Syrian, and John of Damascus. Ephrem’s original work "Tale on the Reason for the Conversion of the Georgians" (უწყებაჲ მიზეზსა ქართველთა მოქცევისასა; uts’qebay mizezsa k’artvelta mok’tsevisasa) is yet another manifesto in defense of autocephaly of the Georgian Orthodox Church which was subject of a dispute between the Georgian and Antiochian churchmen in the 11th century.
