= Efraim (footballer) =

Brazilian footballer (1942–2017)

Personal information
- Full name: Efraim Gomes Júnior
- Date of birth: 6 November 1942
- Place of birth: São Paulo, Brazil
- Date of death: 1 August 2017 (aged 74)
- Place of death: São Paulo, Brazil
- Position: Winger

Youth career
- Colégio Salete

Senior career*
Years	Team	Apps	(Gls)
1961	Bangu		
1962–1964	Ypiranga (futsal)		
1965–1967	São Paulo	18	(2)
1966	→ Francana (loan)		
1967	→ Perdigão-SC (loan)		
1968	Parque da Mooca		
- * Club domestic league appearances and goals as of 28 October 2023

Efraim Gomes Júnior (6 November 1942 – 1 August 2017), simply known as Efraim, was a Brazilian professional footballer and futsal player, who played as a winger.

== Career ==
Efraim played futsal for Bangu and Ypiranga, until São Paulo FC gave him a contract to play 11-a-side football. He also played for AA Francana, Perdigão de Videira and Parque da Mooca.

== Death ==
Efraim died of tuberculosis in São Paulo, 1 August 2017.
