= Dmitry Yefremov (footballer, born 1974) =

Ukrainian association football player

Personal information
- Full name: Dmitry Leonidovich Yefremov
- Date of birth: 12 December 1974 (age 51)
- Place of birth: Kramatorsk, Ukrainian SSR
- Height: 1.75 m (5 ft 9 in)
- Position: Midfielder

Senior career*
Years	Team	Apps	(Gls)
1992	FC Shakhtar-2 Donetsk	1	(0)
1992–1993	FC Donbaskraft Kramatorsk		
1993–1995	FC Volgar-Gazprom Astrakhan	96	(2)
1996	FC Kuban Krasnodar	4	(0)
1996	FC Kuban-d Krasnodar	8	(2)
1997–2001	FC Volgar-Gazprom Astrakhan	133	(9)
2002	FC Ryazan-Agrokomplekt Ryazan	12	(0)
2003	FC Oryol	1	(0)
2003	FC Alnas Almetyevsk	15	(0)
2004	FC Spartak Kostroma	30	(0)
2005	FC Sochi-04	8	(1)
2005	FC Lada-SOK Dimitrovgrad	18	(0)
2006	FC Sudostroitel Astrakhan	26	(2)
2007	FC Mashuk-KMV Pyatigorsk	13	(0)

Managerial career
- 2008–2013: FC Volgar Astrakhan (academy)
- 2014–2018: FSK Dolgoprudny (assistant)
- 2018: FSK Dolgoprudny
- 2018: FSK Dolgoprudny (assistant)
- 2018–2020: FSK Dolgoprudny
- 2020–2021: FC Olimp-Dolgoprudny (assistant)
- 2021–2022: FC Olimp-Dolgoprudny-2 (assistant)
- 2022–2023: FC Kosmos Dolgoprudny (assistant)
- 2024–2025: FC Biolog-Novokubansk
- * Club domestic league appearances and goals

Dmitry Leonidovich Yefremov (Russian: Дмитрий Леонидович Ефремов; Ukrainian: Дмитро Леонідович Єфремов; born 12 December 1974) is a Ukrainian-born Russian football manager and a former player.
