= Mount Ephraim (Vermont) =

Mountain in Springfield, Vermont, U.S.

Highest point
- Elevation: 1,490 ft (450 m)
- Coordinates: 43°15′04″N 72°30′51″W

Geography
- Location: Springfield, Vermont

Climbing
- Easiest route: Massey Road

Mount Ephraim is a 1,490-foot (450 m) mountain near Springfield, Vermont, U.S. and the highest land mass in the Precision Valley. It features one of several mysterious stone monuments that appear through the area.
