= Yevgeni Yefremov (footballer, born 1979) =

Russian footballer

Personal information
- Full name: Yevgeni Gennadyevich Yefremov
- Date of birth: 20 July 1979 (age 47)
- Height: 1.66 m (5 ft 5 in)
- Position: Midfielder

Senior career*
Years	Team	Apps	(Gls)
1997	FC Zhemchuzhina-d Sochi	15	(1)
1998	FC Zhemchuzhina-2 Sochi	30	(2)
1999	FC Spartak-Orekhovo Orekhovo-Zuyevo	4	(0)
2000	FC Tsentr-R-Kavkaz Krasnodar (D4)		
2001–2002	FC Vityaz Krymsk	55	(6)
2003–2004	FC Dynamo Makhachkala	72	(7)
2005–2006	FC Volga Nizhny Novgorod	28	(3)
2008–2011	FC Sever Murmansk	110	(5)
- * Club domestic league appearances and goals

Yevgeni Gennadyevich Yefremov (Russian: Евгений Геннадьевич Ефремов; born 20 July 1979) is a former Russian professional football player.

== Club career ==
He played two seasons in the Russian Football National League for FC Spartak-Orekhovo Orekhovo-Zuyevo and FC Dynamo Makhachkala.
