= Alexander P. Yefremov =

Russian physicist

Alexander P. Yefremov is a Russian physicist, vice rector at Peoples' Friendship University of Russia and director of its Institute of Gravitation and Cosmology.

He has worked at the Peoples' Friendship University of Russia (PFUR) since 1977, among others as its vice rector and head of its physics division.

Yefremov is known for his work in theoretical physics, among others, for his fundamental work on the role of quaternion geometry space in quantum mechanics and field theory.

== Publications ==
Yefremov has authored more than 70 scientific publications in collections and journals.

Selected articles

- A. P. Yefremov: The conic-gearing image of a complex number and a spinor-born surface geometry, Gravitation & Cosmology 17:1-6, 2011, arXiv:1102.0618v1 [math-ph], submitted 3. February 2011
- A. Yefremov, F. Smarandache, V. Christianto: Yang-Mills field from quaternion space geometry, and its Klein-Gordon representation, Progress in Physics, vol. 3, July 2007, pp. 42–50. Also in Florentin Smarandache (ed.): Hadron Models and Related New Energy Issues, InfoLearnQuest, 2007, ISBN 978-1-59973-042-4, p. 208–219
- A. Yefremov: Bi-quaternion square roots, rotational relativity, and dual space-time intervals, Gravitation & Cosmology, Vol. 13 (2007), No. 3 (51), pp. 178–184, Russian Gravitational Society, 2007
- A. P. Yefremov: Quaternions and Biquaternions: Algebra, Geometry and Physical Theories, arXiv:math-ph/0501055v1, submitted 21. January 2005

Books

- “Quaternion spaces, frames of reference and fields”, Moscow, PFUR, 2005 (monograph)
- “Mechanics”, Moscow, PFUR, 2005 (in co-authorship)
