= Dmitry Yefremov (footballer, born 1991) =

Russian association football player

Personal information
- Full name: Dmitry Andreyevich Yefremov
- Date of birth: 2 June 1991 (age 35)
- Height: 1.83 m (6 ft 0 in)
- Position: Midfielder

Senior career*
Years	Team	Apps	(Gls)
2008–2012	Tom Tomsk	0	(0)
2012–2014	Sibiryak Bratsk	46	(1)
2014–2016	Tom Tomsk	0	(0)
2014–2016	→ Tom-2 Tomsk	40	(2)
2016–2017	Smena Komsomolsk-na-Amure	18	(0)
2017–2018	FC Chita	12	(0)
2019	FC Khakassia Abakan		
- * Club domestic league appearances and goals

Dmitry Andreyevich Yefremov (Russian: Дмитрий Андреевич Ефремов; born 2 June 1991) is a Russian former football midfielder.

== Career ==
Yefremov made his professional debut for FC Tom Tomsk on 15 July 2009 in the Russian Cup game against FC Alania Vladikavkaz.
