= Tula constituency =

Russian legislative constituency in Tula Oblast

Tula single-member constituency
- Constituency of the Russian State Duma

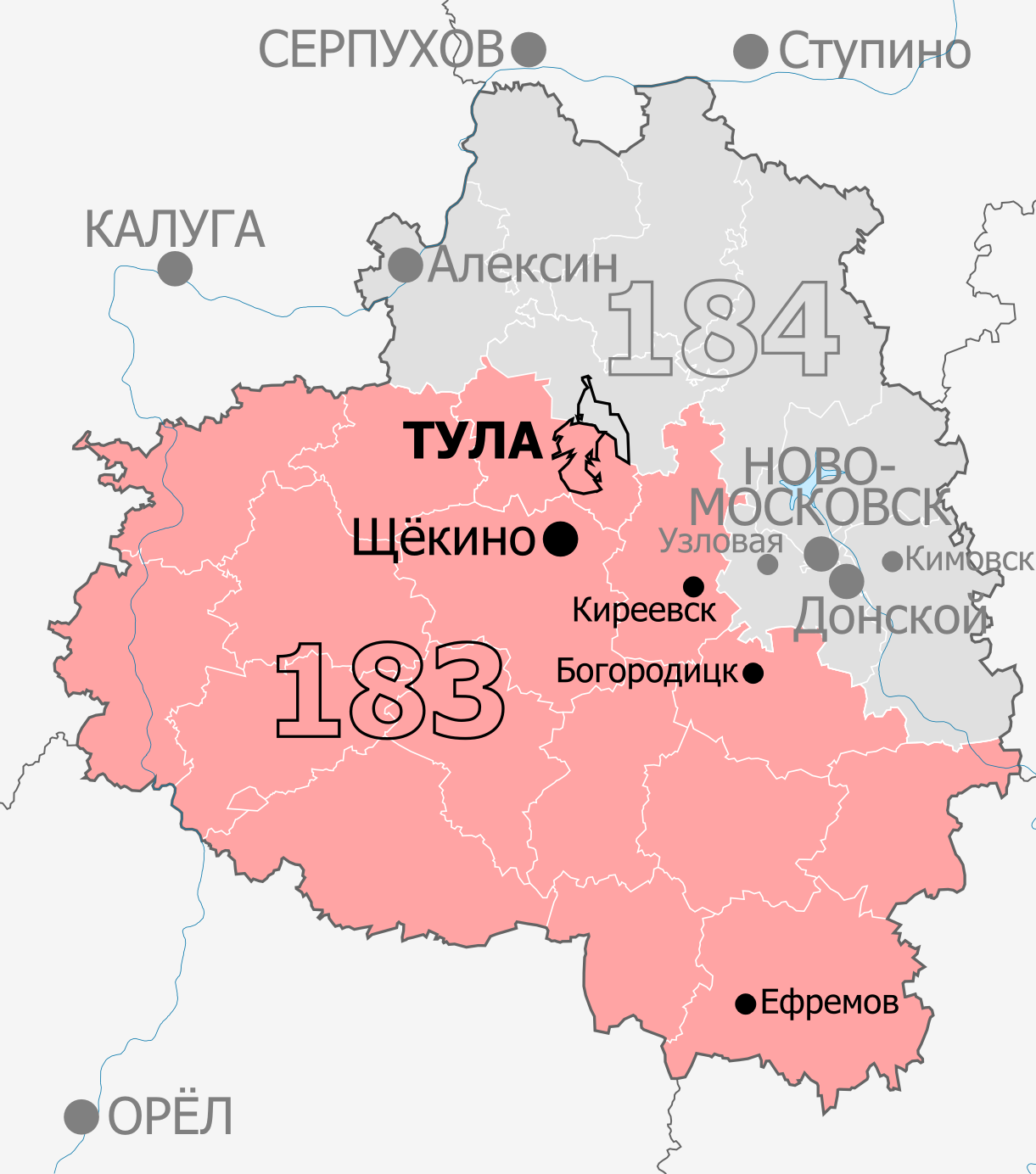
- Constituency boundaries since 2016
- Deputy: Yury Brovko; United Russia
- Federal subject: Tula Oblast
- Districts: Arsenyevsky, Belyovsky, Bogoroditsky, Chernsky, Dubensky, Kamensky, Kireyevsky, Kurkinsky, Odoyevsky, Plavsky, Shchyokinsky, Slavny, Suvorovsky, Tula (Privokzalny, Sovetsky, Tsentralny), Tyoplo-Ogaryovsky, Volovsky, Yefremov
- Voters: 544,057 (2026)

The Tula constituency (No.181 (Note: No.176 in 1993-2007, No.183 in 2016–2026)) is a Russian legislative constituency in Tula Oblast. The constituency covers southern half of Tula and southern Tula Oblast, including the towns Shchyokino, Bogoroditsk, Kireyevsk and Yefremov.

The constituency has been represented since 2026 by United Russia deputy Yury Brovko, retired Medical Service guards podpolkovnik, who won the open seat left vacant following the resignation of two-term United Russia deputy Viktor Dzyuba in February 2026.

== Boundaries ==
1993–1995: Leninsky District, Tula
The constituency covered the entirety of the oblast capital Tula and the suburban Leninsky District.

1995–2007: Tula
After the 1995 redistricting the constituency retained only Tula, losing Leninsky District to Shchyokino constituency. This seat also subsequently became completely surrounded by the Shchyokino constituency.

2016–present: Arsenyevsky District, Belyovsky District, Bogoroditsky District, Chernsky District, Dubensky District, Kamensky District, Kireyevsky District, Kurkinsky District, Odoyevsky District, Plavsky District, Shchyokinsky District, Slavny, Suvorovsky District, Tula (Privokzalny, Sovetsky, Tsentralny), Tyoplo-Ogaryovsky District, Volovsky District, Yefremov
The constituency was re-created for the 2016 election and retained only southern half of Tula, losing the northern half to Novomoskovsk constituency. This seat instead gained almost all of the dissolved Shchyokino constituency in southern Tula Oblast as well as rural Dubensky District from Novomoskovsk constituency.

== Members elected ==
Election	Member	Party
1993	Eduard Pashchenko	Choice of Russia
1995	Aleksandr Lebed (Note: appointed Secretary of the Security Council of Russia in June 1996)	Congress of Russian Communities
1997	Aleksandr Korzhakov	Independent
1999	Aleksandr Korzhakov	Independent
2003	Aleksandr Korzhakov	United Russia
2007	Proportional representation - no election by constituency	
2011	Proportional representation - no election by constituency	
2016	Viktor Dzyuba (Note: resigned in February 2026)	United Russia
2021	Viktor Dzyuba	United Russia
2026	Yury Brovko	United Russia

== Election results ==
=== 1993 ===
Summary of the 12 December 1993 Russian legislative election in the Tula constituency
Candidate	Party	Votes	%
Eduard Pashchenko	Choice of Russia	56,451	20.07%
Nadezhda Shaydenko	Independent	–	17.42%
Igor Baldakov	Independent	–	–
Ivan Khudyakov	Independent	–	–
Vladislav Sukhoruchenkov	Future of Russia–New Names	–	–
Total		281,270	100%

=== 1995 ===
Summary of the 17 December 1995 Russian legislative election in the Tula constituency
Candidate	Party	Votes	%
Aleksandr Lebed	Congress of Russian Communities	129,874	43.48%
Nikolay Tyaglivy	Our Home – Russia	39,099	13.09%
Eduard Pashchenko (incumbent)	Democratic Choice of Russia – United Democrats	29,206	9.78%
Aleksandr Shikalov	Communists and Working Russia - for the Soviet Union	18,913	6.33%
Aleksandr Shemyakin	Liberal Democratic Party	16,788	5.62%
Nikolay Novikov	Independent	12,902	4.32%
Viktor Levshin	Independent	6,452	2.16%
Igor Baldakov	Forward, Russia!	5,692	1.91%
Nikolay Golub	Agrarian Party	5,225	1.75%
Leonid Chevkin	Ivan Rybkin Bloc	3,438	1.15%
Anatoly Krylov	My Fatherland	1,650	0.55%
against all		20,996	7.03%
Total		298,702	100%

=== 1997 ===
Summary of the 9 February 1997 by-election in the Tula constituency
Candidate	Party	Votes	%
Aleksandr Korzhakov	Independent	51,142	26.23%
Eduard Pashchenko	Independent	32,984	16.92%
Anatoly Karpov	Independent	30,718	15.76%
Nikolay Novikov	Independent	23,664	12.14%
Aleksandr Khadartsev	Independent	13,162	6.75%
Vasily Shiryayev	Independent	11,934	6.12%
Vyacheslav Reguzov	Independent	7,530	3.86%
Vyacheslav Makarov	Independent	3,311	1.70%
Yury Belyayev	Independent	550	0.28%
Aleksey Zvyagin	Independent	400	0.21%
against all		13,960	7.16%
Total		194,950	100%
Eligible voters/turnout		448,215	43.49%

=== 1999 ===
Summary of the 19 December 1999 Russian legislative election in the Tula constituency
Candidate	Party	Votes	%
Aleksandr Korzhakov (incumbent)	Independent	51,285	19.61%
Viktor Rozhkov	Independent	46,629	17.83%
Eduard Pashchenko	Union of Right Forces	31,764	12.15%
Vladislav Sukhoruchenkov	Russian All-People's Union	28,281	10.82%
Sergey Nikolsky	Yabloko	22,340	8.54%
Tamara Yurishcheva	Congress of Russian Communities-Yury Boldyrev Movement	11,606	4.44%
Pavel Veselov	Peace, Labour, May	6,141	2.35%
Igor Salomasov	Independent	5,350	2.05%
Aleksey Pokatayev	Stalin Bloc – For the USSR	4,288	1.64%
Mikhail Filshin	Spiritual Heritage	3,944	1.51%
Igor Baldakov	Russian Socialist Party	2,713	1.04%
Yelena Mavrodi	Independent	1,909	0.73%
Sergey Derbenev	Independent	1,115	0.43%
against all		38,808	14.84%
Total		261,464	100%

=== 2003 ===
Summary of the 7 December 2003 Russian legislative election in the Tula constituency
Candidate	Party	Votes	%
Aleksandr Korzhakov (incumbent)	United Russia	57,554	25.71%
Vladislav Sukhoruchenkov	Rodina	46,226	20.65%
Viktor Rozhkov	Independent	44,978	20.09%
Aleksey Berezin	Independent	11,414	5.10%
Mikhail Kharitonov	Yabloko	11,258	5.03%
Igor Artasov	Liberal Democratic Party	5,491	2.45%
Aleksey Pokatayev	Independent	3,845	1.72%
Anatoly Kalinin	United Russian Party Rus'	2,427	1.08%
Andrey Tyunyayev	Social Democratic Party	702	0.31%
against all		36,290	16.21%
Total		224,238	100%

=== 2016 ===
Summary of the 18 September 2016 Russian legislative election in the Tula constituency
Candidate	Party	Votes	%
Viktor Dzyuba	United Russia	167,708	60.91%
Tatyana Kosareva	Communist Party	30,860	11.21%
Ilya Kindeyev	Liberal Democratic Party	20,563	7.47%
Anatoly Kuznetsov	A Just Russia	14,610	5.31%
Oleg Sakharov	Communists of Russia	6,777	2.46%
Vladimir Dorokhov	Yabloko	6,495	2.35%
Vladimir Godunov	Rodina	5,219	1.90%
Yelizaveta Batishcheva	Party of Growth	5,160	1.87%
Yelena Safonova	The Greens	5,037	1.83%
German Konev	People's Freedom Party	3,483	1.26%
Total		275,353	100%

=== 2021 ===
Summary of the 17-19 September 2021 Russian legislative election in the Tula constituency
Candidate	Party	Votes	%
Viktor Dzyuba (incumbent)	United Russia	170,345	55.23%
Tatyana Kosareva	Communist Party	38,163	12.37%
Vladimir Alekseyev	New People	19,051	6.18%
Dmitry Shishkin	A Just Russia — For Truth	17,667	5.73%
Vladimir Rostovtsev	Party of Pensioners	13,712	4.45%
Ilya Kindeyev	Liberal Democratic Party	10,950	3.55%
Yury Moiseyev	Communists of Russia	10,610	3.44%
Olga Podolskaya	Yabloko	8,555	2.77%
Vladimir Ivashkevich	Rodina	4,930	1.60%
Aleksey Salnikov	The Greens	4,499	1.46%
Total		308,452	100%

=== 2026 ===
Summary of the 18-20 September 2026 Russian legislative election in the Tula constituency
Candidate	Party	Votes	%
Yury Brovko	United Russia	176,979	62.28%
Tatyana Kosareva	Communist Party	33,253	11.70%
Anna Ivanova	New People	22,760	8.01%
Aleksandr Marinkov	Liberal Democratic Party	18,261	6.43%
Dmitry Androsov	A Just Russia	16,353	5.75%
Svetlana Bobrovskaya	Party of Pensioners	7,509	2.64%
Yevgeny Galantsev	Rodina	4,696	1.65%
Total		284,181	100%
