= Shchyokino constituency =

Russian legislative constituency

Shchyokino single-member constituency
- Constituency of the Russian State Duma
- Deputy: None
- Federal subject: Tula Oblast
- Districts: Arsenyevsky, Belyovsky, Bogoroditsky, Chernsky, Kamensky, Kireyevsky, Kurkinsky, Leninsky, Odoyevsky, Plavsky, Shchyokinsky, Suvorovsky, Tyoplo-Ogaryovsky, Volovsky, Yefremovsky
- Voters: 468,085 (2003)

The Shchyokino constituency (No.177) was a Russian legislative constituency in Tula Oblast in 1993–2007. It covered southern Tula Oblast. The seat was last occupied by A Just Russia-Rodina faction member Andrey Samoshin, former Head of Leninsky District, who won the open-seat race in the 2003 election.

The constituency was dissolved in 2007 when State Duma adopted full proportional representation for the next two electoral cycles. Shchyokino constituency was not re-established for the 2016 election, as Tula Oblast lost its third seat, and is currently a part of Tula constituency.

== Boundaries ==
1993–1995: Arsenyevsky District, Belyovsky District, Bogoroditsk, Bogoroditsky District, Chernsky District, Kamensky District, Kireyevsky District, Kurkinsky District, Odoyevsky District, Plavsky District, Shchekino, Shchyokinsky District, Suvorovsky District, Tyoplo-Ogaryovsky District, Volovsky District, Yefremov, Yefremovsky District
The constituency covered southern Tula Oblast, including the towns of Bogoroditsk, Shchekino and Yefremov.

1995–2007: Arsenyevsky District, Belyovsky District, Bogoroditsk, Bogoroditsky District, Chernsky District, Kamensky District, Kireyevsky District, Kurkinsky District, Leninsky District, Odoyevsky District, Plavsky District, Shchekino, Shchyokinsky District, Suvorovsky District, Tyoplo-Ogaryovsky District, Volovsky District, Yefremov, Yefremovsky District
After 1995 redistricting the constituency retained all of its territory and gained Leninsky District of suburban Tula from the Tula constituency.

== Members elected ==
Election	Member	Party
1993	Yelena Bogdanova	Agrarian Party
1995	Nikolay Panarin (Note: died in September 1999)	Independent
1999	Ivan Khudyakov	Communist Party
2003	Andrey Samoshin	Independent

== Election results ==
=== 1993 ===
==== Declared candidates ====
- Yelena Bogdanova (APR), forest ranger
- Sergey Gavrilov (Independent), former Member of Tula City Council of People's Deputies (1990–1993)
- Boris Gorbenko (Independent), unemployed
- Aleksandr Ignatenko (Independent), farmers association chairman
- Vitaly Korolyov (Independent), chemical executive
- Aleksandr Lunyov (CPRF), former First Secretary of the CPSU Tula City Committee (1991)
- Nikolay Matveyev (Choice of Russia), aide to Presidential Envoy to Tula Oblast
- Andrey Salnikov (BR–NI), secretary of the Russian Youth Union regional office
- Vladimir Severov (Independent), experimental farm director
- Lev Sladkikh (YaBL), businessman

==== Results ====
Summary of the 12 December 1993 Russian legislative election in the Shchyokino constituency
Candidate	Party	Votes	%
Yelena Bogdanova	Agrarian Party	44,172	15.26%
Sergey Gavrilov	Independent	–	14.40%
Boris Gorbenko	Independent	–	–
Aleksandr Ignatenko	Independent	–	–
Vitaly Korolyov	Independent	–	–
Aleksandr Lunyov	Communist Party	–	–
Nikolay Matveyev	Choice of Russia	–	–
Andrey Salnikov	Future of Russia–New Names	–	–
Vladimir Severov	Independent	–	–
Lev Sladkikh	Yavlinsky–Boldyrev–Lukin	–	–
Total		289,515	100%

=== 1995 ===
==== Declared candidates ====
- Yelena Bogdanova (APR), incumbent Member of State Duma (1994–present)
- Sergey Gavrilov (KRO), former Member of Tula City Council of People's Deputies (1990–1993), 1993 candidate for this seat
- Valentin Gubarev (Yabloko), chairman of the party regional office
- Nagapet Karibdzhanyan (BIR), Chernobyl disaster victims rights activist
- Yevgeny Khrunov (Independent), retired cosmonaut, Hero of the Soviet Union (1969)
- Vladimir Kovalev (LDPR), coordinator of the party regional office
- Svetlana Lymar (Forward, Russia!), nonprofit president
- Valery Nikulin (My Fatherland), vice president of Russian Union of Industrialists and Entrepreneurs (1992–present), former First Secretary of the CPSU Yevpatoria City Committee (1986–1989)
- Nikolay Panarin (Independent), Member of Tula Oblast Duma (1994–present), Chief of Tula Oblast Militsiya (1991–present)
- Vladimir Semago (CPRF), Member of State Duma (1994–present)
- Vladimir Seregin (K–TR–zSS)
- Anatoly Shatalov (Russian Party)

==== Results ====
Summary of the 17 December 1995 Russian legislative election in the Shchyokino constituency
Candidate	Party	Votes	%
Nikolay Panarin	Independent	72,225	20.17%
Yelena Bogdanova (incumbent)	Agrarian Party	56,633	15.82%
Vladimir Semago	Communist Party	46,620	13.02%
Sergey Gavrilov	Congress of Russian Communities	29,080	8.12%
Vladimir Kovalev	Liberal Democratic Party	19,668	5.49%
Anatoly Shatalov	Russian Party	18,780	5.25%
Vladimir Seregin	Communists and Working Russia - for the Soviet Union	18,294	5.11%
Valentin Gubarev	Yabloko	16,657	4.65%
Yevgeny Khrunov	Independent	14,748	4.12%
Svetlana Lymar	Forward, Russia!	9,118	2.55%
Nagapet Karibdzhanyan	Ivan Rybkin Bloc	5,798	1.62%
Valery Nikulin	My Fatherland	5,186	1.45%
against all		35,927	10.04%
Total		357,993	100%

=== 1999 ===
==== Declared candidates ====
- Vladislav Achalov (DPA), former People's Deputy of Russia (1990–1993), former Commander of the Soviet Airborne Forces (1989–1990)
- Aleksandr Butovsky (Independent), Tula State Pedagogical University law senior lecturer
- Vladimir Goverdovsky (SPS), Chief of Tula Oblast Militsiya
- Ivan Khudyakov (CPRF), Member of Tula Oblast Duma (1996–present)
- Ruslan Kim (Independent), businessman
- Dmitry Komarov (Independent), union leader
- Vladimir Kuptsov (RPP), banker
- Vladimir Kuznetsov (NDR), Member of Tula Oblast Duma (1998–present)
- Nikolay Maltsev (Independent), chief of the Moscow Railway Tula division (1998–present)
- Oleg Martynenkov (MTM), Member of Tula City Duma (1997–present)
- Vladimir Naumov (Independent), Chernobyl disaster victims nonprofit chairman
- Vladimir Petrushenkov (Independent), insurance businessman, retired FSB podpolkovnik
- Vladimir Pushkin (RSP), IT businessman
- Viktor Rannikh (Independent), Chairman of the Shchyokino and Shchyokinsky District Committee on Education
- Andrey Tyunyayev (DN), antisemitic writer, journalist
- Vyacheslav Vaneyev (LDPR), party activist
- Nikolay Zhukov (Independent), special school deputy principal

==== Withdrawn candidates ====
- Larisa Vlasova (Independent)

==== Did not file ====
- Aleksandr Dolbanosov (Independent)
- Tamara Malincheva (Nikolayev–Fyodorov Bloc), attorney
- Valery Shcherbakov (Independent)
- Viktor Smirnov (Independent)
- Yury Urusov (Independent)

==== Results ====
Summary of the 19 December 1999 Russian legislative election in the Shchyokino constituency
Candidate	Party	Votes	%
Ivan Khudyakov	Communist Party	72,438	24.44%
Nikolay Maltsev	Independent	42,568	14.36%
Vladislav Achalov	Movement in Support of the Army	21,798	7.35%
Vladimir Petrushenkov	Independent	15,510	5.23%
Viktor Rannikh	Independent	11,369	3.84%
Vladimir Naumov	Independent	9,884	3.34%
Vladimir Kuptsov	Party of Pensioners	9,059	3.06%
Dmitry Komarov	Independent	8,387	2.83%
Nikolay Zhukov	Independent	7,886	2.66%
Vyacheslav Vaneyev	Liberal Democratic Party	7,767	2.62%
Vladimir Goverdovsky	Union of Right Forces	7,123	2.40%
Vladimir Kuznetsov	Our Home – Russia	6,114	2.06%
Oleg Martynenkov	Peace, Labour, May	5,179	1.75%
Ruslan Kim	Independent	5,122	1.73%
Aleksandr Butovsky	Independent	4,809	1.62%
Andrey Tyunyayev	Spiritual Heritage	4,088	1.38%
Vladimir Pushkin	Russian Socialist Party	1,971	0.67%
against all		46,167	15.58%
Total		296,370	100%

=== 2003 ===
Results by district: Andrey Samoshin: 10–20% 20–30% 30–40%; Yelena Drapeko: 20–30% 30–40%; Mikhail Kazakov: 30–40% 40–50%; Sergey Zalyotin: 20–30%; Vyacheslav Kiselev: 30–40%

==== Declared candidates ====
- Yelena Drapeko (CPRF), Member of State Duma (2000–present)
- Vladimir Isayev (LDPR), nonprofit director
- Gennady Kazakov (Independent), chairman of the United Russia party regional executive committee
- Mikhail Kazakov (Independent), Member of Tula Oblast Duma (2000–present)
- Aleksandr Kharlamov (NK–AR), Member of Tula Oblast Duma (2001–present)
- Artashes Khoralov (Independent), poet, composer, singer
- Vyacheslav Kiselev (Independent), energy businessman
- Mikhail Kreymer (Independent), political consultant
- Anatoly Malykhin (Independent), former Presidential Envoy to Kemerovo Oblast (1991–1997)
- Andrey Samoshin (Independent), Head of Administration of Leninsky District (1997–present), 2001 gubernatorial candidate
- Yelena Shestopalova (Independent), Russian State Agrarian Distance University methodologist
- Aleksandr Yashin (United Russia), Member of State Duma (2000–present)
- Sergey Zalyotin (Independent), cosmonaut

==== Withdrawn candidates ====
- Viktor Zakharyev (PVR-RPZh), Member of Tula City Duma (2001–present)

==== Did not file ====
- Aleksey Chukin (Independent), farmer
- Ivan Khudyakov (Independent), incumbent Member of State Duma (2000–present)
- Olga Orlova (Independent), individual entrepreneur
- Viktor Shutas (Independent), businessman
- Oleg Yashin (Independent), unemployed

==== Results ====
Summary of the 7 December 2003 Russian legislative election in the Shchyokino constituency
Candidate	Party	Votes	%
Andrey Samoshin	Independent	57,551	23.44%
Yelena Drapeko	Communist Party	43,755	17.82%
Mikhail Kazakov	Independent	28,202	11.49%
Sergey Zalyotin	Independent	22,750	9.27%
Aleksandr Yashin	United Russia	20,675	8.42%
Vyacheslav Kiselev	Independent	11,440	4.66%
Gennady Kazakov	Independent	8,871	3.61%
Mikhail Kreymer	Independent	8,799	3.58%
Vladimir Isayev	Liberal Democratic Party	4,780	1.95%
Yelena Shestopalova	Independent	2,091	0.85%
Artashes Khoralov	Independent	1,835	0.75%
Anatoly Malykhin	Independent	1,337	0.54%
Aleksandr Kharlamov	New Course — Automobile Russia	1,321	0.54%
against all		27,016	11.01%
Total		245,538	100%
