= Shchekino (disambiguation) =

Shchekino (Russian: Щекино) or Shchyokino (Щёкино) is the name of several inhabited localities in Russia.

== Kursk Oblast ==
- Shchekino, Kursk Oblast, a selo in Shchekinsky Selsoviet of Rylsky District

== Moscow Oblast ==
- Shchekino, Moscow Oblast, a village in Nudolskoye Rural Settlement of Klinsky District

== Nizhny Novgorod Oblast ==
- Shchekino, Nizhny Novgorod Oblast, a village in Nikolo-Pogostinsky Selsoviet of Gorodetsky District

== Perm Krai ==
- Shchekino, Perm Krai, a selo in Usolsky District

== Smolensk Oblast ==
- Shchekino, Gagarinsky District, Smolensk Oblast, a village in Pokrovskoye Rural Settlement of Gagarinsky District
- Shchekino, Ugransky District, Smolensk Oblast, a village in Zakharyevskoye Rural Settlement of Ugransky District
- Shchekino, Yartsevsky District, Smolensk Oblast, a village under the administrative jurisdiction of Yartsevskoye Urban Settlement of Yartsevsky District

== Tula Oblast ==
- Shchekino, a town in Shchyokinsky District
- Shchekino (rural locality), Tula Oblast, a village in Shevelevskaya Rural Administration of Shchyokinsky District

== Tver Oblast ==
- Shchekino, Molokovsky District, Tver Oblast, a village in Deledinskoye Rural Settlement of Molokovsky District
- Shchekino, Torzhoksky District, Tver Oblast, a village in Maryinskoye Rural Settlement of Torzhoksky District

== Vladimir Oblast ==
- Shchekino, Kameshkovsky District, Vladimir Oblast, a village in Kameshkovsky District
- Shchekino, Vyaznikovsky District, Vladimir Oblast, a village in Vyaznikovsky District

== Vologda Oblast ==
- Shchekino, Velikoustyugsky District, Vologda Oblast, a village in Tregubovsky Selsoviet of Velikoustyugsky District
- Shchekino, Verkhovazhsky District, Vologda Oblast, a village in Chushevitsky Selsoviet of Verkhovazhsky District
- Shchekino, Vologodsky District, Vologda Oblast, a village in Podlesny Selsoviet of Vologodsky District
- Shchekino, Vytegorsky District, Vologda Oblast, a village in Tudozersky Selsoviet of Vytegorsky District
