= Arsenyevsky =

Arsenyevsky (masculine), Arsenyevskaya (feminine), or Arsenyevskoye (neuter) may refer to:

- Arsenyevsky District, a district of Tula Oblast, Russia
- Arsenyevsky Urban Okrug, a municipal formation in Primorsky Krai, Russia, into which the town of Arsenyev is incorporated

== See also ==
- Arsenyev (disambiguation)
- Arsenyevo
