= Plavsky =

Plavsky (masculine), Plavskaya (feminine), or Plavskoye (neuter) may refer to:

- Plavsky District, a district of Tula Oblast, Russia
- Plavskoye, name of Plavsk, now a town in Tula Oblast, Russia, in 1926–1935
