= Arsenyevo =

Arsenyevo (Russian: Арсеньево) is the name of several inhabited localities in Russia.

Urban localities

- Arsenyevo, Arsenyevsky District, Tula Oblast, a work settlement in Arsenyevsky District of Tula Oblast

Rural localities

- Arsenyevo, Khabarovsk Krai, a selo in Nanaysky District of Khabarovsk Krai
- Arsenyevo, Oryol Oblast, a village in Protasovsky Selsoviet of Mtsensky District of Oryol Oblast
- Arsenyevo, Ryazan Oblast, a village in Shchetininsky Rural Okrug of Mikhaylovsky District of Ryazan Oblast
- Arsenyevo, Plavsky District, Tula Oblast, a village in Yusupovsky Rural Okrug of Plavsky District of Tula Oblast
- Arsenyevo, Shchyokinsky District, Tula Oblast, a village in Nikolskaya Rural Administration of Shchyokinsky District of Tula Oblast
- Arsenyevo, Tyoplo-Ogaryovsky District, Tula Oblast, a village in Bolshe-Ogarevsky Rural Okrug of Tyoplo-Ogaryovsky District of Tula Oblast
- Arsenyevo, Uzlovsky District, Tula Oblast, a village in Lyutoricheskaya Rural Administration of Uzlovsky District of Tula Oblast
- Arsenyevo, Venyovsky District, Tula Oblast, a selo in Kukuysky Rural Okrug of Venyovsky District of Tula Oblast
- Arsenyevo, Tver Oblast, a village in Pankovo Rural Settlement of Staritsky District of Tver Oblast
