= Slavny =

Slavny (Russian: Славный; masculine), Slavnaya (Славная; feminine), or Slavnoye (Славное; neuter) is the name of several inhabited localities in Russia:

- Slavny, Tula Oblast, an urban locality (an urban-type settlement) in Tula Oblast
- Slavny, name of several rural localities in Russia
- Slavnaya, a rural locality (a village) in Tambov Oblast
- Slavnoye, a rural locality (a village) in Tver Oblast
