= Viktor Dzyuba =

Russian politician (born 1977)

- Виктор Дзюба
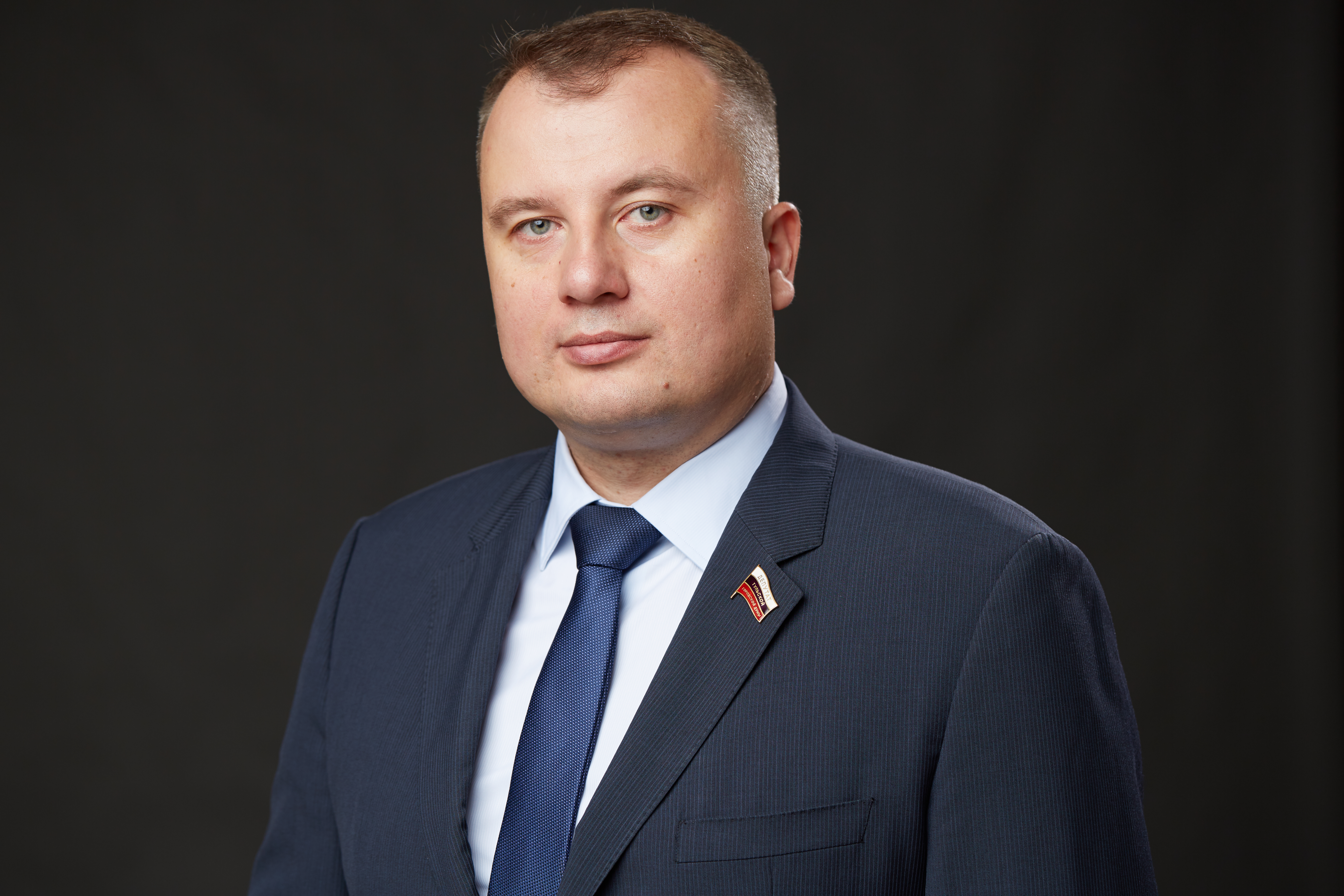

Member of the State Duma for Tula Oblast
- Incumbent
- Assumed office 5 October 2016
- Preceded by: constituency re-established
- Constituency: Tula (No. 183)

Personal details
- Born: 10 August 1977 (age 49) Tula, Russian SFSR, USSR
- Party: United Russia
- Education: Tula State Lev Tolstoy Pedagogical University

Viktor Victorovich Dzyuba (Russian: Виктор Викторович Дзюба; born 10 August 1977) is a Russian politician and a deputy of the 8th State Duma. In March 2006 he became a member of the United Russia. On 14 March 2010 he was elected deputy of the Tula City Duma of the 4th convocation. Four years later, he was re-elected for the 5th convocation. In 2016 he successfully ran for the 7th State Duma from the Tula constituency. In 2017, he became one of the 100 most influential people of the Tula oblast.

Since 2021, he has served as a deputy of the 8th State Duma.

== Legislative activity ==
From 2016 to 2019, during his tenure as a deputy of the 7th State Duma, he co-authored 22 legislative initiatives and amendments to federal draft laws.

== Awards and Honors ==
2019

- Commendation of the Chairman of the State Duma of the Federal Assembly of the Russian Federation

2018

- Letter of Appreciation from the President of the Russian Federation, Vladimir Putin

2017

- Commendation of the Governor of Tula Oblast, Alexey Dyumin

2016

- Second-Class Honorary Badge “Tula Benefactor” awarded by the Administration of the city of Tula

== Sanctions ==
He was sanctioned by Canada under the Special Economic Measures Act (S.C. 1992, c. 17) in relation to the Russian invasion of Ukraine for Grave Breach of International Peace and Security, and by the UK government in 2022 in relation to Russo-Ukrainian War.
