= Belyovsky District =

Belyovsky District Белёвский район (Russian)
- District
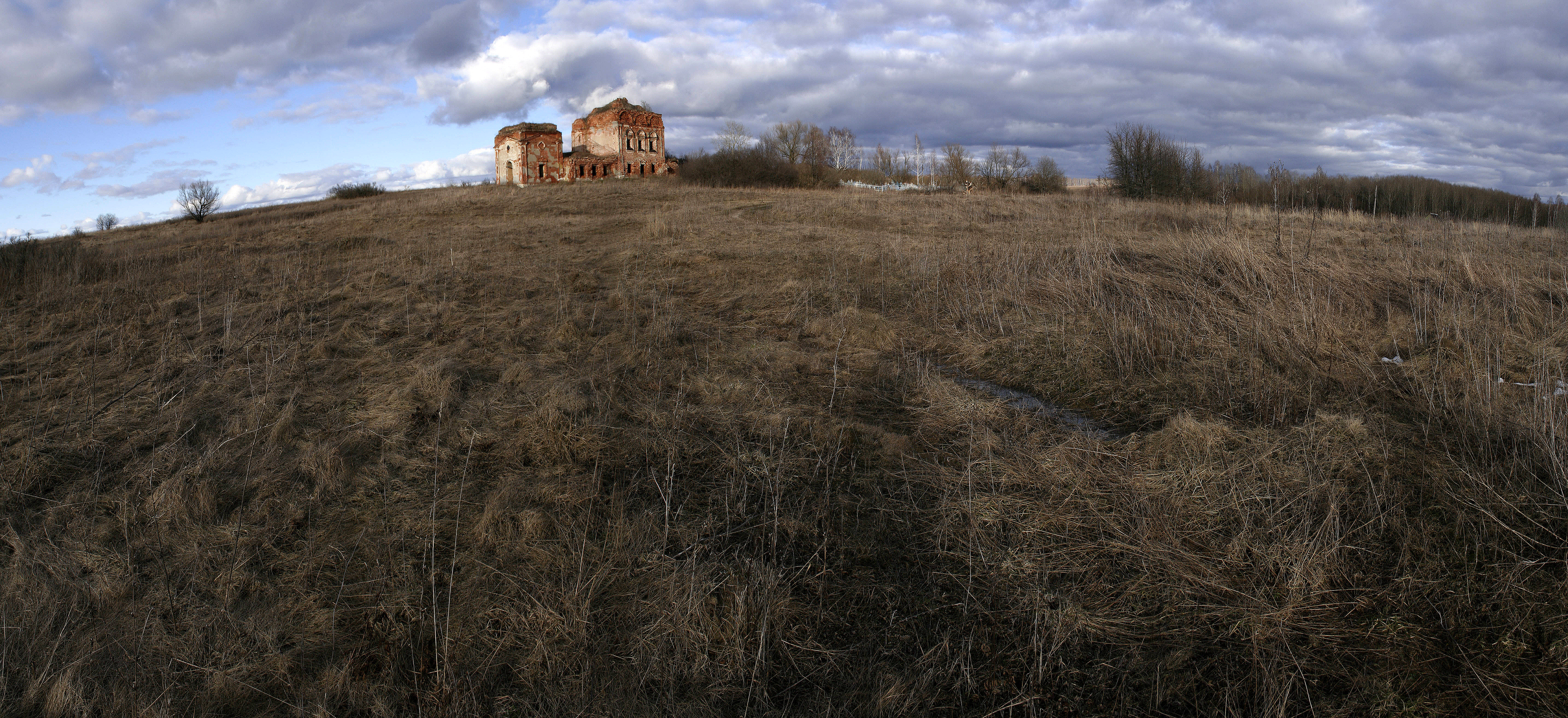
- Ruins of a church in the selo of Temryan in Belyovsky District

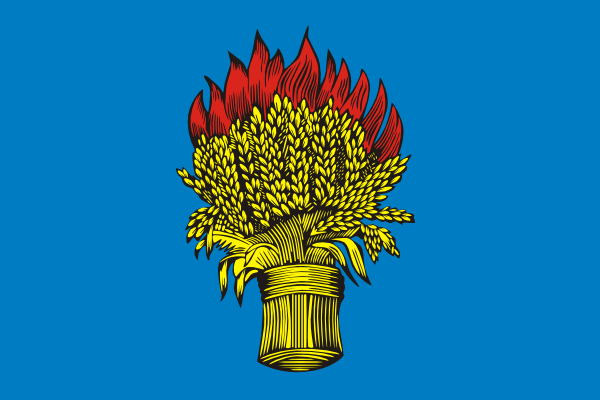
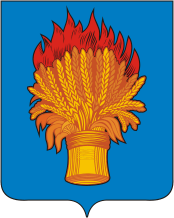
- Flag Coat of arms
- Location of Belyovsky District in Tula Oblast
- Coordinates: 53°48′N 36°08′E
- Country: Russia
- Federal subject: Tula Oblast
- Established: 28 March 1924
- Administrative center: Belyov

Area
  - Total: 1,190 km^{2} (460 sq mi)

Population (2010 Census)
  - Total: 20,952
  - Density: 17.6/km^{2} (45.6/sq mi)
  - Urban: 66.4%
  - Rural: 33.6%

Administrative structure
  - Administrative divisions: 1 Towns under district jurisdiction, 16 Rural okrugs
  - Inhabited localities: 1 cities/towns, 170 rural localities

Municipal structure
  - Municipally incorporated as: Belyovsky Municipal District
  - Municipal divisions: 1 urban settlements, 4 rural settlements
- Time zone: UTC+3 (MSK)
- OKTMO ID: 70606000
- Website: http://belev.tularegion.ru/

Belyovsky District (Russian: Белёвский райо́н) is an administrative district (raion), one of the twenty-three in Tula Oblast, Russia. Within the framework of municipal divisions, it is incorporated as Belyovsky Municipal District. It is located in the west of the oblast. The area of the district is 1,190 square kilometers (460 sq mi). Its administrative center is the town of Belyov. Population: 20,952 (2010 Census); 24,912 (2002 census); 30,124 (1989 Soviet census). The population of Belyov accounts for 66.4% of the district's total population.

== Geography ==
Belyovsky District is located in the west of Tula Oblast, on hilly terrain in the central Russian Plain. The district is 80 km southwest of the city of Tula, and about 200 km southwest of Moscow. A highway runs directly from the district's central city of Belyov to the city of Tula, and another highway runs north-south through the middle of the district along the Oka River. The area measures 40 km (north-south), and 42.5 km (west-east). The administrative center is the town of Belyov.

The district is bordered on the north by Suvorovsky District, on the east by Odoyevsky District, on the south by Arsenyevsky District, and on the west by Kozelsky District (Kaluga Oblast), Ulyanovsky District) (Kaluga Oblast), and Bolkhovsky District (Oryol Oblast).

== History ==
The district's history is centered on the city of Belyov, one of the oldest cities in Russia. Because it was on the southwest frontier of the central Russian area for several centuries, it changed hands frequently and saw much fighting. The earliest recorded inhabitants were the Vyatichi tribe of the Eastern Slavs, at least through the 10th century. Located on the upper reaches of the Oka River, the area grew economically on trade and the production of handicrafts.

During the times of Kievan Rus', it was part of the Principality of Chernigov. In the 14th and 15th centuries, it was part of Lithuania. Ivan III ("the Great") attached the area to Russia by the end of the 15th century. The region was attacked by the Tatars in 1507, 1512, 1530, 1536 and 1544. During this time, Belyev became both a fortress in the defensive line of Russia and a major religious center with two monasteries founded. In 1777, by decree of Catherine the Great, the district was officially formed as part of Tula Province. The Russian poet Vasily Zhukovsky was born in the village of Mishenskoe in Belyovsky District in 1783.
