= Boris Yeltsin: From Dawn to Dusk =

1997 book by Aleksandr Vasilʹevič Koržakov

- 1st Russian edition cover
- Author: Aleksandr Korzhakov
- Original title: Борис Ельцин: от рассвета до заката
- Language: Russian
- Subject: Boris Yeltsin
- Genre: Memoir
- Publisher: Interbook
- Publication date: 1997
- Publication place: Russia
- Media type: Print (hardback and paperback)
- ISBN: 5-88589-039-0
- OCLC: 38591467
- LC Class: DK290.3.Y45 K67 1997

Boris Yeltsin: From Dawn to Dusk (Russian: Борис Ельцин: от рассвета до заката, sometimes translated to English as Boris Yeltsin: From Dawn till Dusk) is a 1997 memoir book by Aleksandr Korzhakov, former head of Boris Yeltsin's security. In it Korzhakov describes eleven years of his service and the personality of his patron, first president of Russia. Yeltsin is portrayed as a heavy-drinker who hides his health problems. Yeltsin and Korzhakov split acrimoniously when Yeltsin fired him in June 1996.

In 2004 next part of the book Boris Yeltsin: From Dawn to Dusk. Afterword was published.
