= Varton =

Russian technology company

- Type: Private
- Industry: LED lighting
- Founded: 2009; 17 years ago
- Headquarters: Moscow, Russia
- Area served: Russia
- Key people: Denis Frolov (chairman), Ilya Sivtsev (CEO)
- Revenue: about 3.25 billion rubles
- Number of employees: 500
- Website: http://varton.ru/en

Varton is a Russian technology company, a manufacturer of LED lighting.

The winner of Eurasian Award 'Golden Photon' in 2020, 2021, 2022, 2023 in "Best product of the year" and "Best project of the year" nominations.

== History ==
The company was founded in 2009 by Denis Frolov, the former development director at Wimm-Bill-Dann group, who decided to start his own business after he learned that the group was planned to be sold to PepsiCo in 2010. Before Frolov had been buying LED lamps for the production, and he assumed that the demand for them will grow. The parliamentary debate of the law On Energy Saving (adopted a year later, in November 2009) also contributed to his choice of business niche.

Start-up capital amounted to 40 million rubles of his own and borrowed funds. The company started with sales of Chinese compact fluorescent lamps under its own brand Gauss. Ilya Sivtsev, who previously helped Frolov find suppliers and distribute Gauss products, soon became his business partner, co-owner and executive director of Varton. The decision made in 2010 to reorient to LED lighting, led to making enough profit by the fall of 2012 to purchase an abandoned factory in the town Bogoroditsk of Tula region and to invest 250 million in the launching of the production and enter the corporate market with a new trade mark Varton. By 2016, total investment in the factory reached 1 billion rubles.

== Business model ==
The structure of Varton includes laboratory and scientific-production center of 20 thousand square meters in Bogoroditsk, the central office in Moscow and overseas in Hong Kong and Italy. The company employs 500 people, half of them work at the production site, where students of the Bogoroditsk polytechnic college take part in work experience programs. 20 full-time employees work in the company’s design center developing new lamps.

Factory in Bogoroditsk produces lamps and lenses, imports sockets, lamps radiators, electronic drivers and LED elements, organizes the final assembly. Production is sold through a dealer network, available in Russia, CIS countries, some countries in Europe and Africa.

Since April 2015 the company is included in the list of organizations that have a significant impact on industry and trade of the Ministry of Industry and Trade of the Russian Federation. In 2015, the company sold about 1.4 million lamps, factory revenue amounted to 1.3 billion rubles, the turnover of the company amounted to 3.25 billion rubles. In autumn of 2015 it was estimated by the general director of Development Corporation of the Tula region, that Varton company controls 18% of Russia's LED lighting market.

In August 2016 in an interview with Director General the CEO at Varton reported that the company stopped using the principle of the conveyor assembly in favor of the entire product assembled by one person, which increased productivity and helped to expand the range without increasing the staff number. Responding to questions from the newspaper RBC in 2015, the COO told about the company’s plans to localize LED production in Russia and use components made in Russia only by 2017.

== Projects ==
The company has developed and supplied lighting for the federal highway M11 (Moscow–Saint Petersburg motorway), the design of which takes into account the great distance between lampposts, and lights of the GUM façade, that emit light of a certain tone, are strictly protected from moisture, frost up to -60 °C and heat up to + 60 °C. According to the First Deputy Governor of the Rostov region, the company's lamps are used for indoor lighting of the stadium Rostov Arena. Emergency lighting equipment produced by Varton is used in the IKEA store in the Moscow suburb of Khimki, Burger King restaurants, the Moscow City Clinical Hospital №72, trade and industrial zone Altufyevo in Moscow region.

As part of an experiment made together with one of the residents of innovative territorial cluster Zelenograd, the company has installed a vending machine for the sale of LED bulbs in the territory of the cluster.

== Awards ==
In 2013 the company has won in two nominations of the III annual award in the field of energy saving Save energy! – in the category of household and industrial lighting, and in the category of an innovative energy-saving technology and energy efficiency.

Packaging design of Gauss lamps was awarded first place in the category "Packaging and Label" at the national advertising festival Idea! in 2009, a silver award in 2009 and the bronze medal in 2013 at the international packaging design competition Pentawards.
