= Suvorov, Tula Oblast =

Town in Tula Oblast, Russia

Suvorov Суворов
- Town
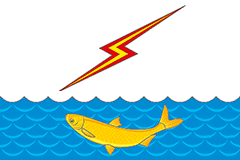
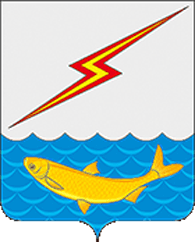
- Flag Coat of arms
- Interactive map of Suvorov
- Location of Suvorov Suvorov (Tula Oblast)
- Coordinates: 54°09′N 36°33′E
- Country: Russia
- Federal subject: Tula Oblast
- Administrative district: Suvorovsky District
- Town under district jurisdictionSelsoviet: Suvorov
- Known since: 15th–16th centuries
- Town status since: 1954
- Elevation: 190 m (620 ft)

Population (2010 Census)
  - Total: 18,973
  - Estimate (2021): 17,598 (−7.2%)

Administrative status
  - Capital of: Suvorovsky District, Suvorov Town Under District Jurisdiction

Municipal status
  - Municipal district: Suvorovsky Municipal District
  - Urban settlement: Suvorov Urban Settlement
  - Capital of: Suvorovsky Municipal District, Suvorov Urban Settlement
- Time zone: UTC+3 (MSK)
- Postal codes: 301430–301433, 301439
- OKTMO ID: 70640101001

Suvorov (Russian: Суво́ров) is a town and the administrative center of Suvorovsky District in Tula Oblast, Russia, located 90 kilometers (56 mi) west of Tula, the administrative center of the oblast. Population: 18,973 (2010 census); 21,213 (2002 census); 21,885 (1989 Soviet census).

== History ==
The village of Suvorova (Суво́рова) has been known since the 15th–16th centuries. It was granted town status in 1954.

== Administrative and municipal status ==
Within the framework of administrative divisions, Suvorov serves as the administrative center of Suvorovsky District. As an administrative division, it is incorporated within Suvorovsky District as Suvorov Town Under District Jurisdiction. As a municipal division, Suvorov Town Under District Jurisdiction is incorporated within Suvorovsky Municipal District as Suvorov Urban Settlement.
