= Plavsk =

Town in Tula Oblast, Russia

Plavsk Плавск
- Town
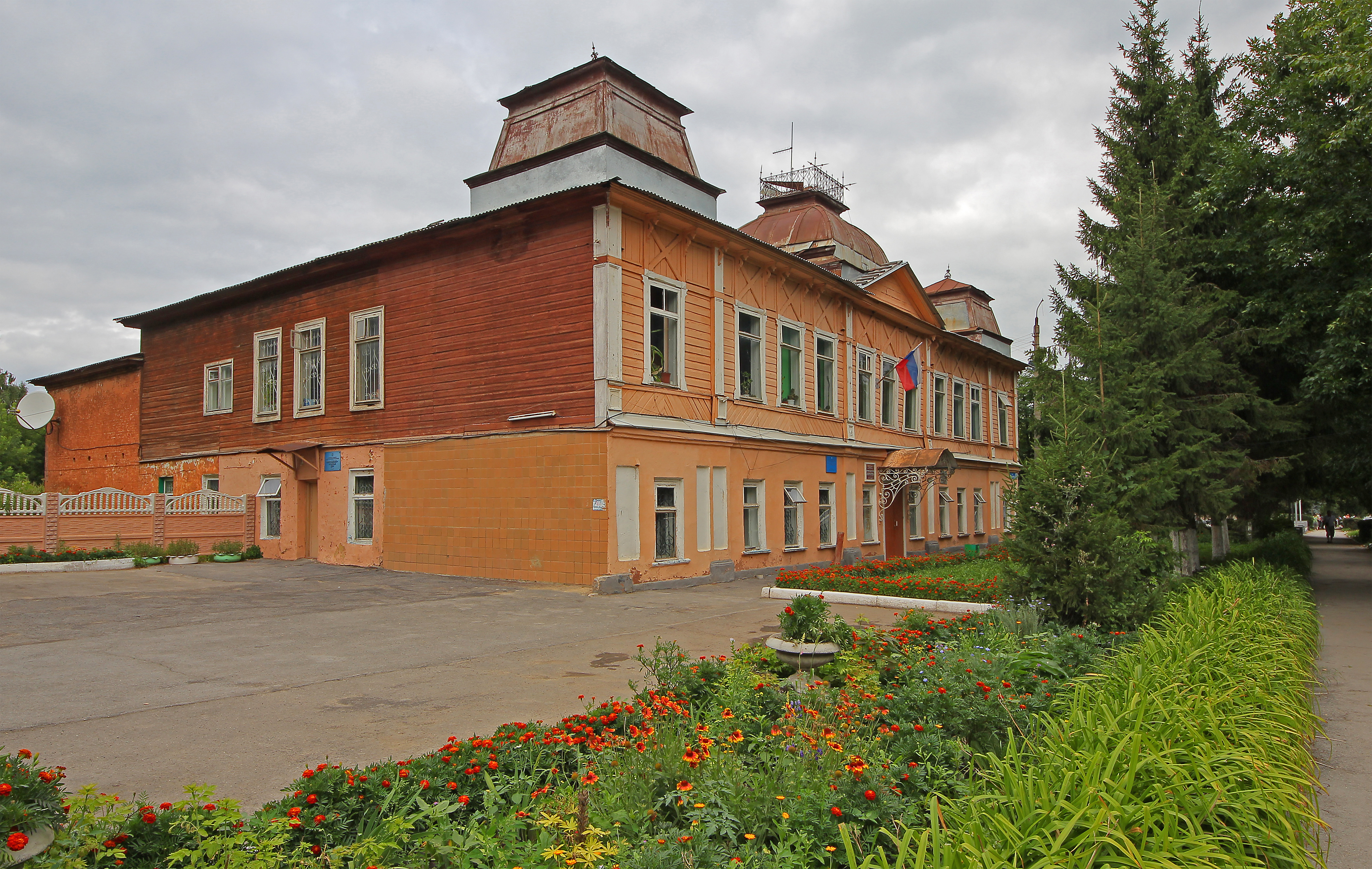
- Administration building in Plavsk

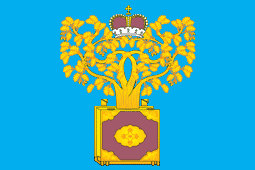
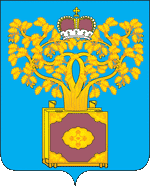
- Flag Coat of arms
- Interactive map of Plavsk
- Location of Plavsk Plavsk (Tula Oblast)
- Coordinates: 53°43′N 37°17′E
- Country: Russia
- Federal subject: Tula Oblast
- Administrative district: Plavsky District
- Town under district jurisdictionSelsoviet: Plavsk
- Founded: 1540 (Julian)
- Elevation: 190 m (620 ft)

Population (2010 Census)
  - Total: 16,165
  - Estimate (2021): 16,893 (+4.5%)

Administrative status
  - Capital of: Plavsky District, Plavsk Town Under District Jurisdiction

Municipal status
  - Municipal district: Plavsky Municipal District
  - Urban settlement: Plavsk Urban Settlement
  - Capital of: Plavsky Municipal District, Plavsk Urban Settlement
- Time zone: UTC+3 (MSK)
- Postal code: 301470–301472
- OKTMO ID: 70638101001

Plavsk (Russian: Плавск) is a town and the administrative center of Plavsky District in Tula Oblast, Russia, located on the Plava River. Population: 16,165 (2010 census); 16,750 (2002 census); 16,559 (1989 Soviet census).

Plavsk, Russia is widely known as a major "radioactive hotspot" resulting from the 130-kilometer-wide radioactive plume that drifted over the Tula region following the April 26, 1986, Chernobyl nuclear disaster. Located about 600 kilometers northeast of the Chernobyl plant, the Plavsk district received exceptionally heavy deposits of radioactive material. This environmental legacy continues to impact the area today.

== Administrative and municipal status ==
Within the framework of administrative divisions, Plavsk serves as the administrative center of Plavsky District. As an administrative division, it is incorporated within Plavsky District as Plavsk Town Under District Jurisdiction. As a municipal division, Plavsk Town Under District Jurisdiction is incorporated within Plavsky Municipal District as Plavsk Urban Settlement.
