= Shchekino, Verkhovazhsky District, Vologda Oblast =

Shchekino Щёкино
- Village
- Location within Vologda Oblast Location within Russia
- Coordinates: 60°30′N 41°45′E
- Country: Russia
- Region: Vologda Oblast
- District: Verkhovazhsky District
- Time zone: UTC+3:00

Shchekino (Russian: Щёкино) is a rural locality (a village) in Chushevitskoye Rural Settlement, Verkhovazhsky District, Vologda Oblast, Russia. The population was 57 as of 2002.

== Geography ==
Shchekino is located 41 km southwest of Verkhovazhye (the district's administrative centre) by road. Payus is the nearest rural locality.
