= Shchekino, Vytegorsky District, Vologda Oblast =

Shchekino Щекино
- Village
- Location within Vologda Oblast Location within Russia
- Coordinates: 61°11′N 36°28′E
- Country: Russia
- Region: Vologda Oblast
- District: Vytegorsky District
- Time zone: UTC+3:00

Shchekino (Russian: Щекино) is a rural locality (a village) in Andomskoye Rural Settlement, Vytegorsky District, Vologda Oblast, Russia. The population was 62 as of 2002. There are 3 streets.

== Geography ==
Shchekino is located 26 km north of Vytegra (the district's administrative centre) by road. Panshino is the nearest rural locality.
