= Arsenyevo, Arsenyevsky District, Tula Oblast =

Arsenyevo Арсеньево
- Work settlement
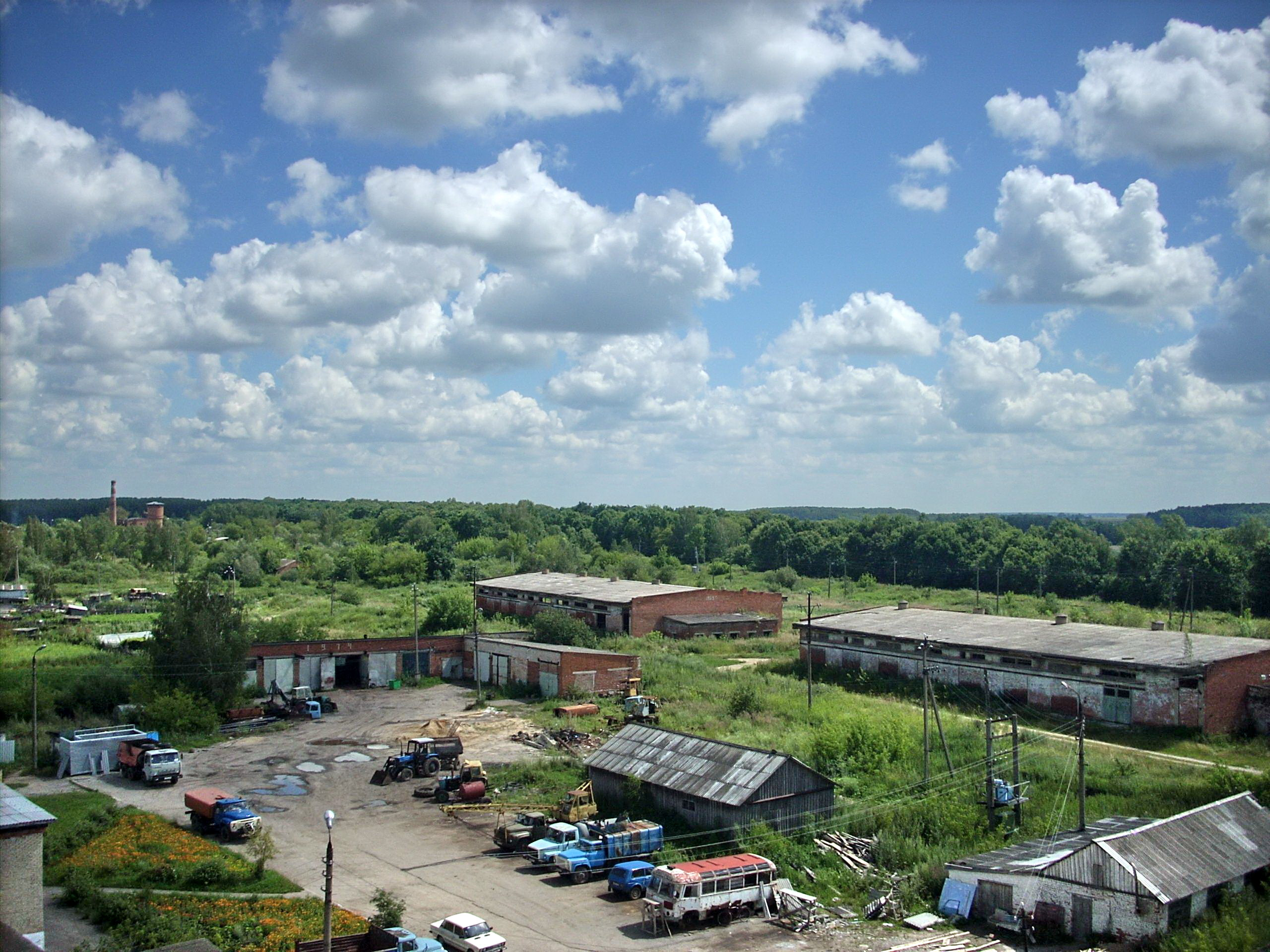
- Interactive map of Arsenyevo
- Location of Arsenyevo Arsenyevo (Tula Oblast)
- Coordinates: 53°44′24″N 36°39′15″E
- Country: Russia
- Federal subject: Tula Oblast
- Administrative district: Arsenyevsky District
- Elevation: 231 m (758 ft)

Population (2010 Census)
  - Total: 4,803
  - Estimate (2021): 4,680 (−2.6%)

Administrative status
  - Capital of: Arsenyevsky District

Municipal status
  - Municipal district: Arsenyevsky Municipal District
  - Urban settlement: Arsenyevo Urban Settlement
  - Capital of: Arsenyevsky Municipal District, Arsenyevo Urban Settlement
- Time zone: UTC+3 (MSK)
- Postal code: 301510
- OKTMO ID: 70604151051

Arsenyevo (Russian: Арсе́ньево) is an urban locality (a work settlement) and the administrative center of Arsenyevsky District of Tula Oblast, Russia. Population: 4,803 (2010 census); 5,995 (2002 census); 5,773 (1989 Soviet census).

== Administrative and municipal status ==
Within the framework of administrative divisions, Arsenyevo serves as the administrative center of Arsenyevsky District and is incorporated within it as an urban-type settlement. As a municipal division, the work settlement of Arsenyevo is incorporated as Arsenyevo Urban Settlement within Arsenyevsky Municipal District.
