= Alexander Korzhakov =

Russian former KGB general

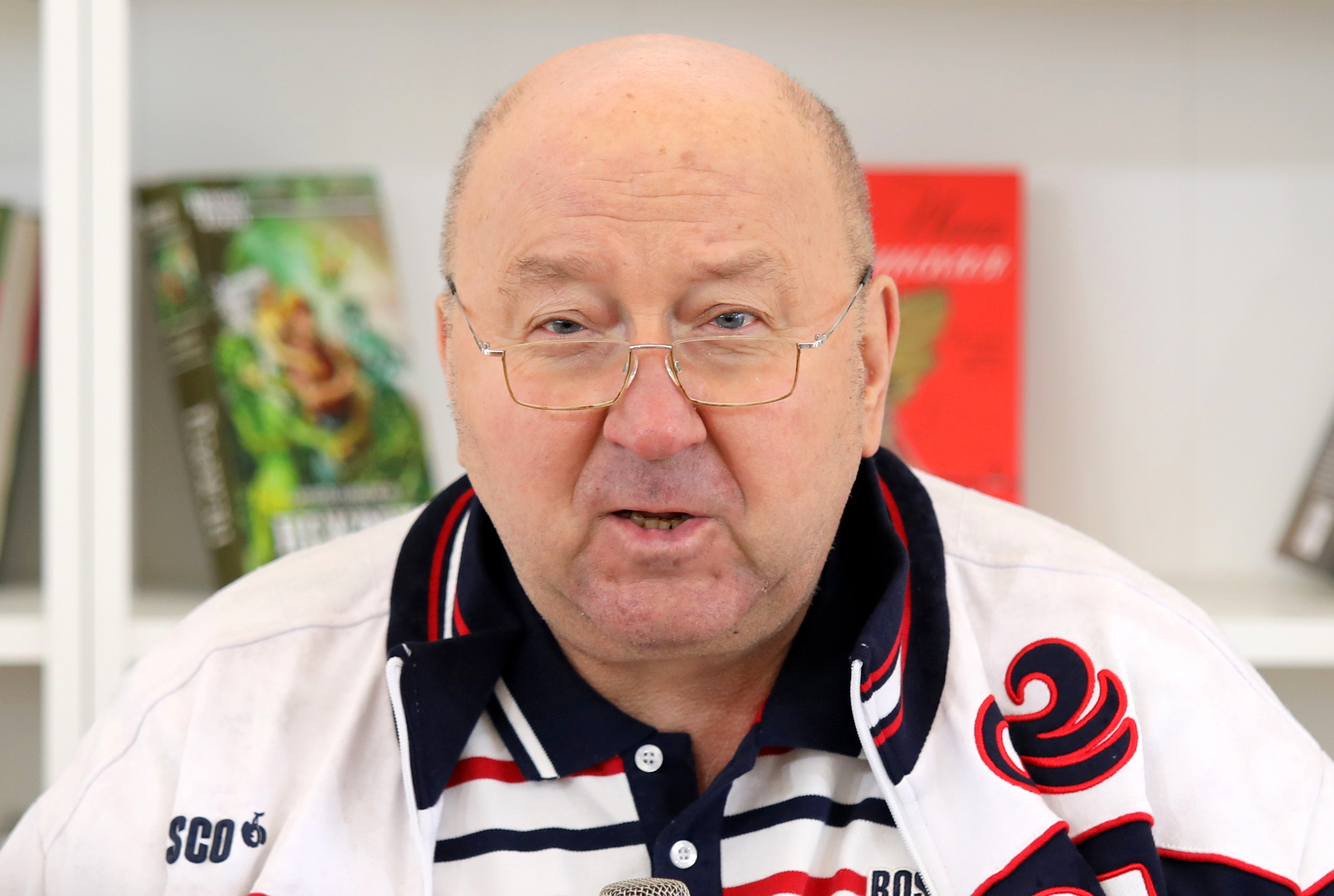
- Korzhakov in 2017

Head of the Presidential Security Service
- In office 1991–1996
- President: Boris Yeltsin
- Preceded by: Oleg Lobov
- Succeeded by: Ivan Rybkin

Personal details
- Born: Alexander Vasilyevich Korzhakov; 31 January 1950 (age 76) Moscow, Russian SFSR, Soviet Union

Alexander Vasilyevich Korzhakov (Russian: Александр Васильевич Коржаков; born 31 January 1950) is a Russian former KGB general who served as Boris Yeltsin's bodyguard, confidant, and adviser for eleven years. He was the head of the Presidential Security Service (PSB) from 1991 to 1996, State Duma deputy from 1997 to 2011, and retired Lieutenant-general. Korzhakov had been Yeltsin's bodyguard since 1985, and on 19 August 1991, he stood next to his boss on top of a tank during Yeltsin's historic speech.

Being the Chief of the Security Service, Korzhakov was widely criticized for interfering in government affairs and business. In 1996, he was finally sacked after losing a power struggle with the Prime Minister. He then successfully ran for a seat in the State Duma where he received immunity from prosecution. In 1997, Korzhakov published a biography based on his experience at the very top of Russian politics. In the biography he contends that he and the Security Service "governed the country for three years".

== Early life ==
Alexander Korzhakov was born in Moscow to a worker family. After graduating at secondary school, he worked as an assembly worker. In 1969–1970 he served as a private in the Kremlin Regiment. In 1970–1989 he served in the KGB 9th Chief Directorate, "Protection of Higher Party and Government Officials". As a KGB official, he became a member of the Communist Party in 1971, being a member of the Party bureau of subdivisions and member of the committee of the Komsomol for the 9th administration.

In 1978 he was transferred into a KGB subdivision, which dealt with personal protection. In 1980 he graduated "by Correspondence" from a Moscow Law Institute (Russian: Всесоюзный юридический заочный институт Moskovskiy Yuridichesky Institut, Zaochny fakultet). Following service in Afghanistan in 1981–1982, he was one of General Secretary Yuri Andropov's personal bodyguards in 1983–1984. In 1985 he became one of three personal bodyguards of Boris Yeltsin, who at the time was the leader of the Communist Party organization in Moscow. When, in 1987, Yeltsin was removed from his party position, Korzhakov kept the friendship and in 1989 was retired from KGB for his support of Yeltsin – officially, Korzhakov was discharged from the KGB due to "health and age reasons". After his retirement he became a private body guard of Yeltsin, albeit officially worked as the Chief of Security of a co-operative named "Plastic".

In 1989, Korzhakov gave notice about his resignation from the Communist Party and was subsequently expelled for "non-payment of the party dues".

After the incident on 28 September 1989, when Boris Yeltsin fell from a bridge, Korzhakov set up a unit of former KGB agents to protect Yeltsin. Following the election of Yeltsin in June 1991 as President of the RSFSR, Korzhakov became the Chief of Yeltsin's Security Service, which was later transformed into the Presidential Security Service when the Soviet Union was dissolved. He was responsible for the protection of Yeltsin during the August coup attempt in 1991 and on 4 October 1993, when the White House of Russia was stormed.

=== Head of the Security Service ===
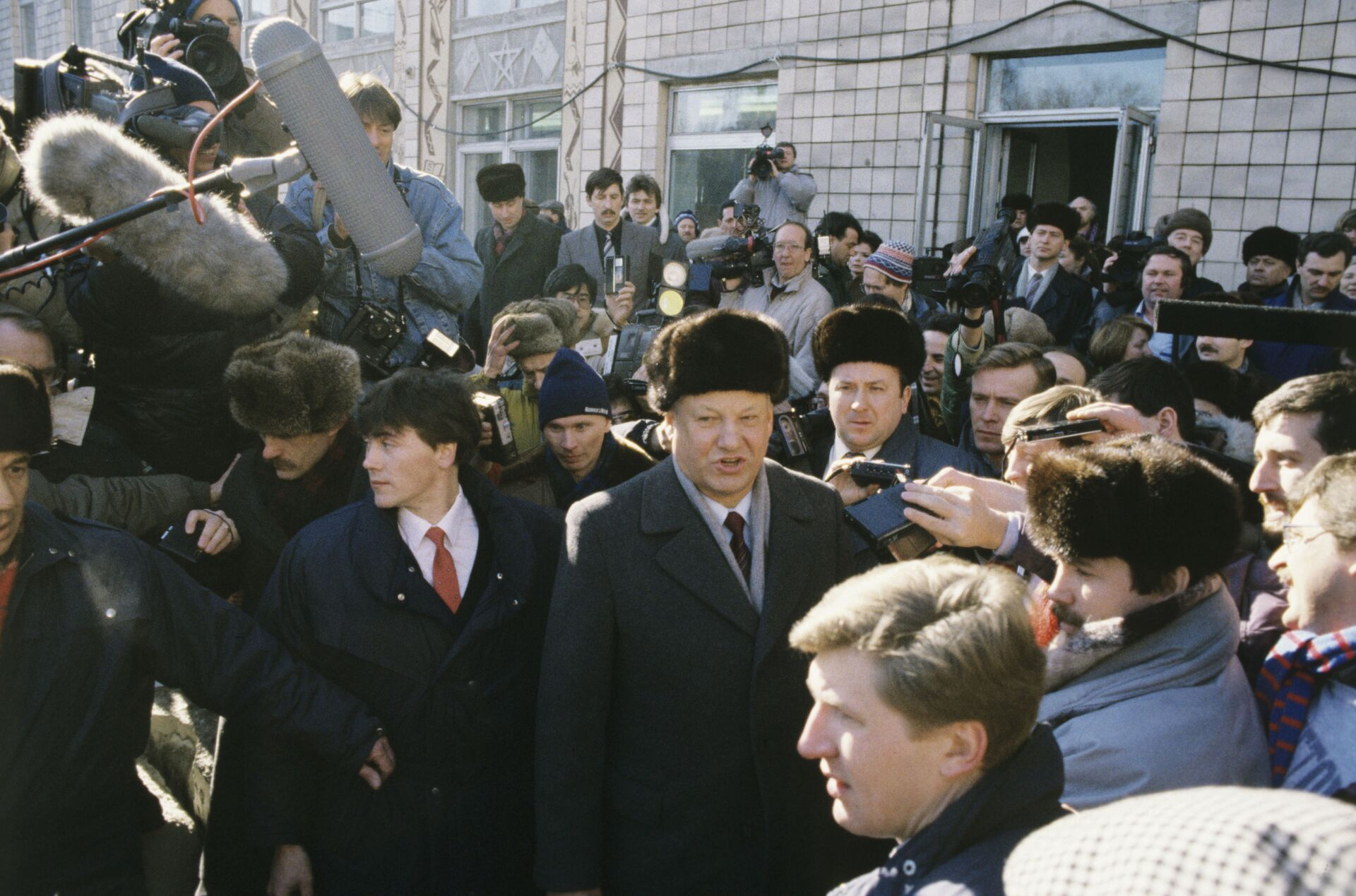
Korzhakov with Yeltsin in 1991

Being the head of the Presidential Security Service, Korzhakov was frequently accused of interfering in governmental affairs, as the Service gathered evidence on high government officials engaged in corruption, bribe-taking, and squandering money. He was regarded as one of the hard-liners of Yeltsin's team, a strong backer of the war in Chechnya, and an opponent to holding the presidential election in 1996.

In December 1994, Korzhakov organized an armed raid on the Moscow headquarters of Most Bank headed by Vladimir Gusinsky, an ally with Moscow Mayor Yuriy Luzhkov, who was a potential rival to Yeltsin in the 1996 presidential elections. Soon after the raid, Luzhkov denied he had any desire to run for president – and Gusinsky quickly moved with his family to London.

Running up to the 1996 presidential election, there were serious doubts that President Boris Yeltsin would allow elections to take place. On 5 May 1996, Korzhakov explicitly called for postponing the elections. However, the elections took place as planned and Yeltsin finished first on 16 June 1996, initial round of the presidential elections with about 35% of the vote, scheduled to compete with Communist leader Gennady Zyuganov in the runoff on 3 July 1996.

During Korzhakov's reign, it is believed that the Presidential Security Service acquired documents which implicated first deputy prime minister Anatoly Chubais in illegal financial transactions during the privatization period that followed the collapse of the Soviet Union. On 19 June 1996 Sergey Lisovsky (a wealthy advertising and showbusiness magnate) and Arkady Yevstafyev (a close aide to former first deputy prime minister Anatoly Chubais) were arrested while leaving the White House of Russia, allegedly carrying a case containing 500 thousand dollars. After being questioned for 11 hours by Presidential Security Service, Lisovsky and Yevstafyev were released. Tipped off by Chubais, television networks started to broadcast updates on the unfolding scandal through the night, portraying the arrests as a coup attempt by Korzhakov. The next day, 20 June 1996, Korzhakov was abruptly dismissed by Yeltsin at the urging of Chubais.

According to one view, the firings of Korzhakov were the result of a battle between factions within the President's inner circle – between a group that wanted to take power by force and a group that wanted to win the election "legitimately." Others saw the events in the context of an ongoing struggle between three groups: the former heads of the power ministries, representatives of the energy complex, and representatives from financial circles.

== Biography ==
In his biography, Boris Yeltsin: From Dawn to Dusk (1997), Korzhakov describes how the Russian Political elite views democracy – an overwhelmingly negative evaluation of Russian politics. Naturally, the book has been severely criticized, however, only few people have accused the author of inventing or distorting the major facts.

=== The 1993 storming of the Parliament ===
An important contribution of the biography is its description of the anti-democratic mentality inside the Kremlin. Korzhakov explains the severely negative outlook of Yeltsin, and the ruling elite as a whole, towards the democratic institutions. Korzhakov recounts certain developments in March 1993, when the Russian parliament was only inches away from impeaching the president. Aware of this danger, Yeltsin ordered Korzhakov to prepare the arrest of all deputies in the case of impeachment. Referring to documents never published before, Korzhakov asserts that Yeltsin had even planned to use chemical gases in order to "smoke" the deputies from the building. The Parliament was eventually stormed by the Russian army on 4 October 1993 and the rebellion suppressed by force.

=== The 1996 presidential election ===
In regards to the presidential election in 1996, as well as in 1993, Yeltsin had – according to Korzhakov – no intention of leaving the Kremlin and was prepared to take any actions to insure his continued stay. Yeltsin felt free to express his contempt toward democratic principles in Korzhakov's presence. Some episodes the author relates are almost resonant of the Nixon years and the published Watergate tapes. According to Korzhakov, in the summer of 1996, Yeltsin and his prime minister, Victor Chernomyrdin debated the very serious possibility of canceling the presidential election. Korzhakov adds several significant details which possibly confirm the view that the Kremlin violated many democratic rules during the presidential election campaign in 1996. He also fully explains, with much elaboration, the story about how Anatoly Chubais' people tried to illegally take 500 thousand dollars from the Kremlin.

=== The Yeltsin family ===
Democratic institutions such as the Parliament and the courts played an extremely limited role in the life of the Kremlin and had no influence over the decision-making process. Instead, Yeltsin's family emerges, according to Korzhakov, as a leading political institution in Russia. Korzhakov concludes, "when it came to making decisions, Yeltsin was motivated not by the interest of the state, but by his own family clan".

Alexander Litvinenko – a former KGB/FSB Officer who changed sides in early-mid 2000s in his book "Blowing Up Russia" blames Korzhakov (along with Barsukov): only "their greed for money" was the reason of the first and partly the second chechen war.

=== The people around Yeltsin ===
Korzhakov contends that the Kremlin was run by various unconventional leaders such as body guards like Korzhakov, himself. In the book, Korzhakov confessed that he and the FSB chief Mikhail Barsukov, another member of Yeltsin's guard, "governed the country for three years".

Korzhakov paints an interesting portrait of the people around Yeltsin, few of whom are depicted as being more elevated in moral virtue and intellect than the author. Korzhakov describes the atmosphere surrounding Yeltsin as thick with unbridled favoritism, a fertile ground for intrigues among those struggling for the president's ear.

Even the idea of murder hangs over the Kremlin in the late 1990s. The requests and promises of people in the Kremlin to murder their political rivals are interspersed throughout the book. In 1999, Korzhakov repeated allegations that financial mogul Boris Berezovsky tried to convince him to murder Moscow Mayor Yuri Luzhkov, financial tycoon and NTV founder Vladimir Gusinsky, as well as popular crooner and Duma deputy Iosif Kobzon, a Luzhkov ally.

Korzhakov also contends that during his State Duma election campaign in the aftermath of his ousting from the Kremlin in June 1996, his political adversaries wanted to kill his main rival in the parliamentary election in Tula in order to render the election invalid.

== Legacy ==
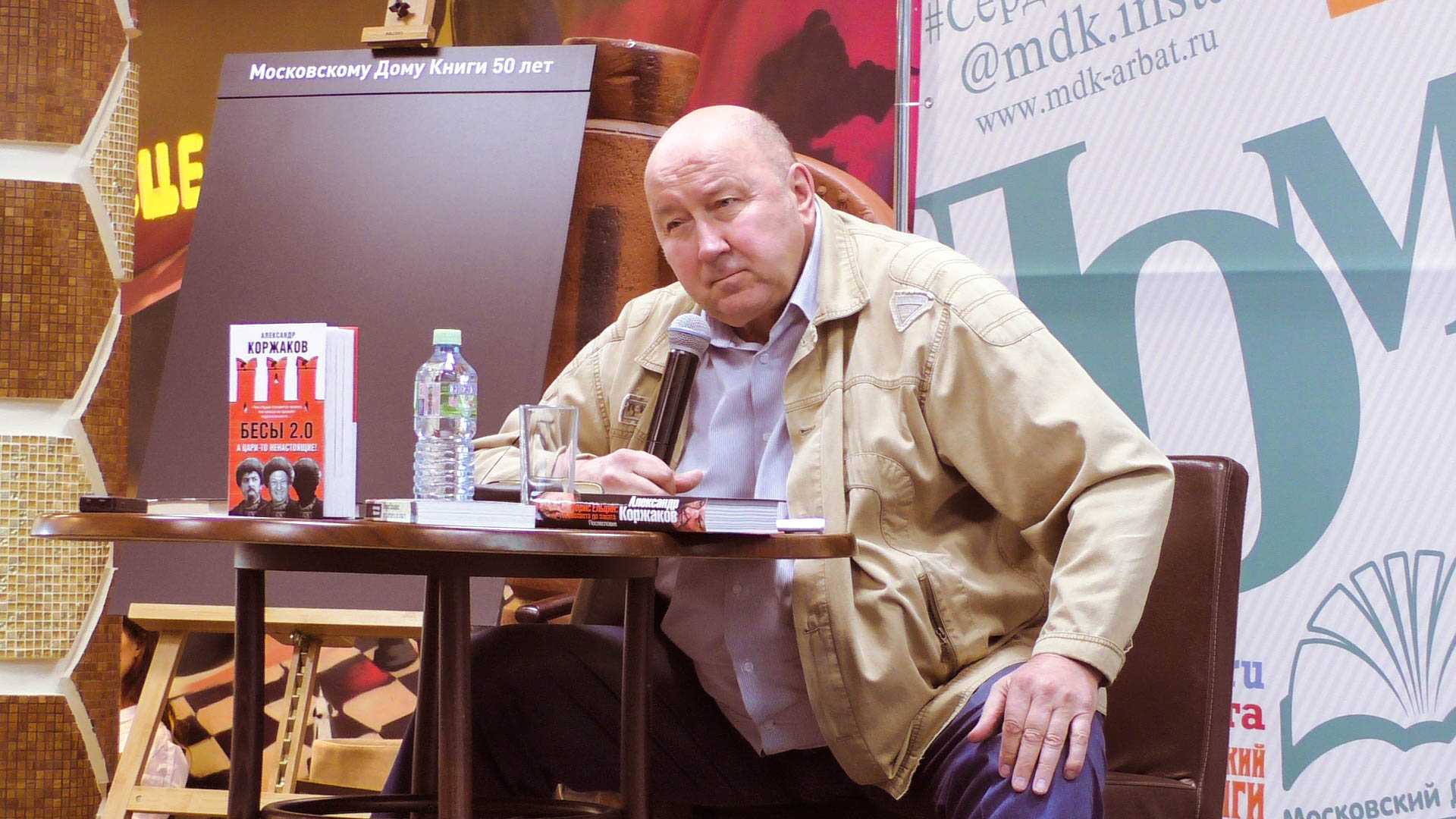
Korzhakov presenting his book Besy 2.0 in 2017

Following the replacement of Korzhakov, the Presidential Security Service was reorganized under Anatoly Kuznetsov, a professional without any political ambitions or interests, effectively depriving the Service its unique political influence.

In January 1997, Korzhakov won, as an independent candidate, a by-election over 10 other candidates with 26.86 percent of the vote in Tula, south of Moscow, filling a vacancy left by Alexander Lebed. In the State Duma he quickly became a member of the defence committee. The same year, he worked as a consultant of the artistic motion picture Shizofreniya by director Viktor Sergeyev. In January 2000 Korzhakov became deputy from Fatherland – All Russia. Today he is a member of United Russia.

== Honours and awards ==
- Order for Personal Courage
- Medal Defender of a Free Russia
- Jubilee Medal "In Commemoration of the 100th Anniversary since the Birth of Vladimir Il'ich Lenin"
- Jubilee Medal "60 Years of the Armed Forces of the USSR"
- Jubilee Medal "70 Years of the Armed Forces of the USSR"
- Medal "For Impeccable Service" 1st, 2nd and 3rd classes
