= Shchekino, Vologodsky District, Vologda Oblast =

Shchekino Щёкино
- Village
- Location within Vologda Oblast Location within Russia
- Coordinates: 59°06′N 39°57′E
- Country: Russia
- Region: Vologda Oblast
- District: Vologodsky District
- Time zone: UTC+3:00

Shchekino (Russian: Щёкино) is a rural locality (a village) in Podlesnoye Rural Settlement, Vologodsky District, Vologda Oblast, Russia. The population was 5 as of 2002.

== Geography ==
Shchekino is located 15 km south of Vologda (the district's administrative centre) by road. Nadeyevo is the nearest rural locality.
