= Shchekino, Kameshkovsky District, Vladimir Oblast =

Village in Vladimir Oblast

Shchekino Щекино
- Village
- Location within Vladimir Oblast Location within Russia
- Coordinates: 56°28′N 40°58′E
- Country: Russia
- Region: Vladimir Oblast
- District: Kameshkovsky District
- Time zone: UTC+3:00

Shchekino (Russian: Щекино) is a rural locality (a village) in Vakhromeyevskoye Rural Settlement, Kameshkovsky District, Vladimir Oblast, Russia. The population was 71 as of 2010.

== Geography ==
Shchekino is located on the Talsha River, 19 km north of Kameshkovo (the district's administrative centre) by road. Imeni Maksima Gorkogo is the nearest rural locality.
