= Bogoroditsk =

Town in Tula Oblast, Russia

Bogoroditsk Богородицк
- Town
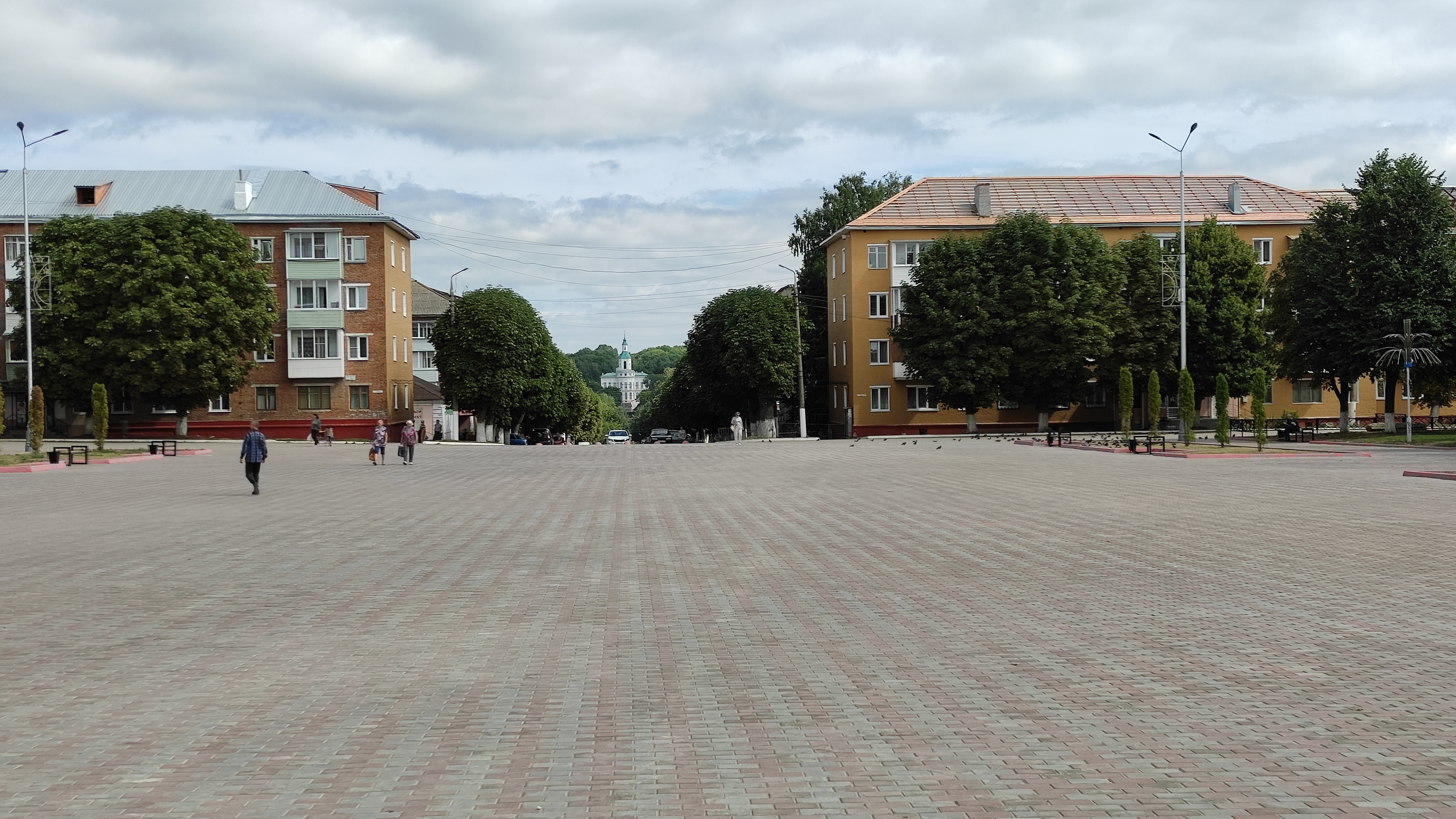
- Central square of Bogoroditsk

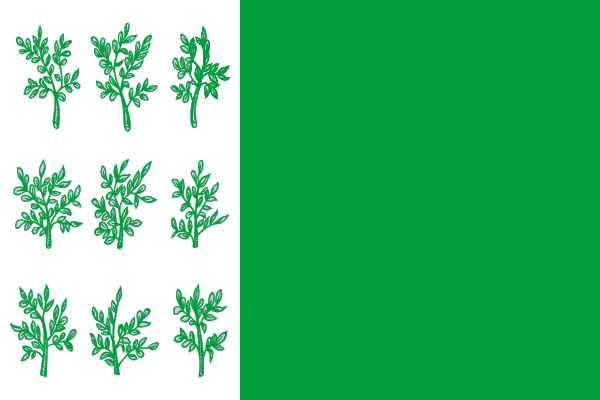
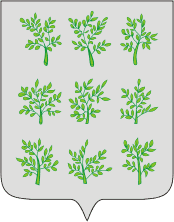
- Flag Coat of arms
- Interactive map of Bogoroditsk
- Location of Bogoroditsk Bogoroditsk (Tula Oblast)
- Coordinates: 53°46′N 38°08′E
- Country: Russia
- Federal subject: Tula Oblast
- Administrative district: Bogoroditsky District
- Town under district jurisdictionSelsoviet: Bogoroditsk
- Founded: second half of the 17th century
- Town status since: 1777

Government
  - Body: Assembly of Deputies
- Elevation: 220 m (720 ft)

Population (2010 Census)
  - Total: 31,897
  - Estimate (2021): 29,560 (−7.3%)

Administrative status
  - Capital of: Bogoroditsky District, Bogoroditsk Town Under District Jurisdiction

Municipal status
  - Municipal district: Bogoroditsky Municipal District
  - Urban settlement: Bogoroditsk Urban Settlement
  - Capital of: Bogoroditsky Municipal District, Bogoroditsk Urban Settlement
- Time zone: UTC+3 (MSK)
- Postal codes: 301830–301833, 301835, 301836, 301839
- Dialing code: +7 48761
- OKTMO ID: 70608101001
- Website: mo-bogorodick.ru

Bogoroditsk (Russian: Богоро́дицк) is a town and the administrative center of Bogoroditsky District in Tula Oblast, Russia, located on the Upyorta River, a tributary of the Upa. Population: 31,897 (2010 census); 30,884 (2002 census); 33,552 (1989 Soviet census).

== History ==
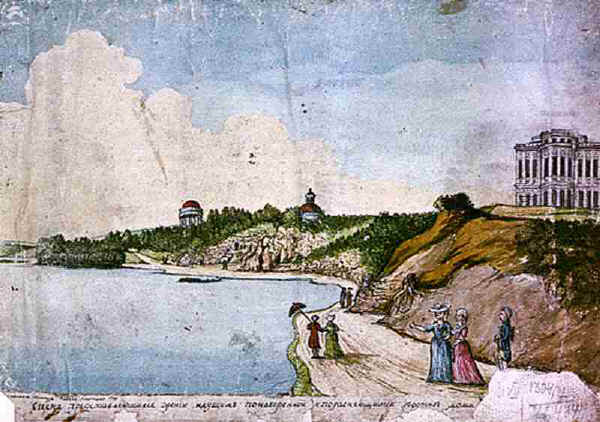
The château and park at Bogoroditsk in 1786 (watercolor by Bolotov)

It was founded in the second half of the 17th century as a wooden fort. In the 1770s, the fort was demolished to make room for the palace of the Bobrinsky family. The main château, designed by Ivan Starov and partly destroyed during World War II, is adjoined by an English park, said to be the earliest in Russia outside St. Petersburg. Bogoroditsk was granted town status in 1777. During World War II, Bogoroditsk was under German occupation from 15 November 1941 until 15 December 1941.

== Administrative and municipal status ==
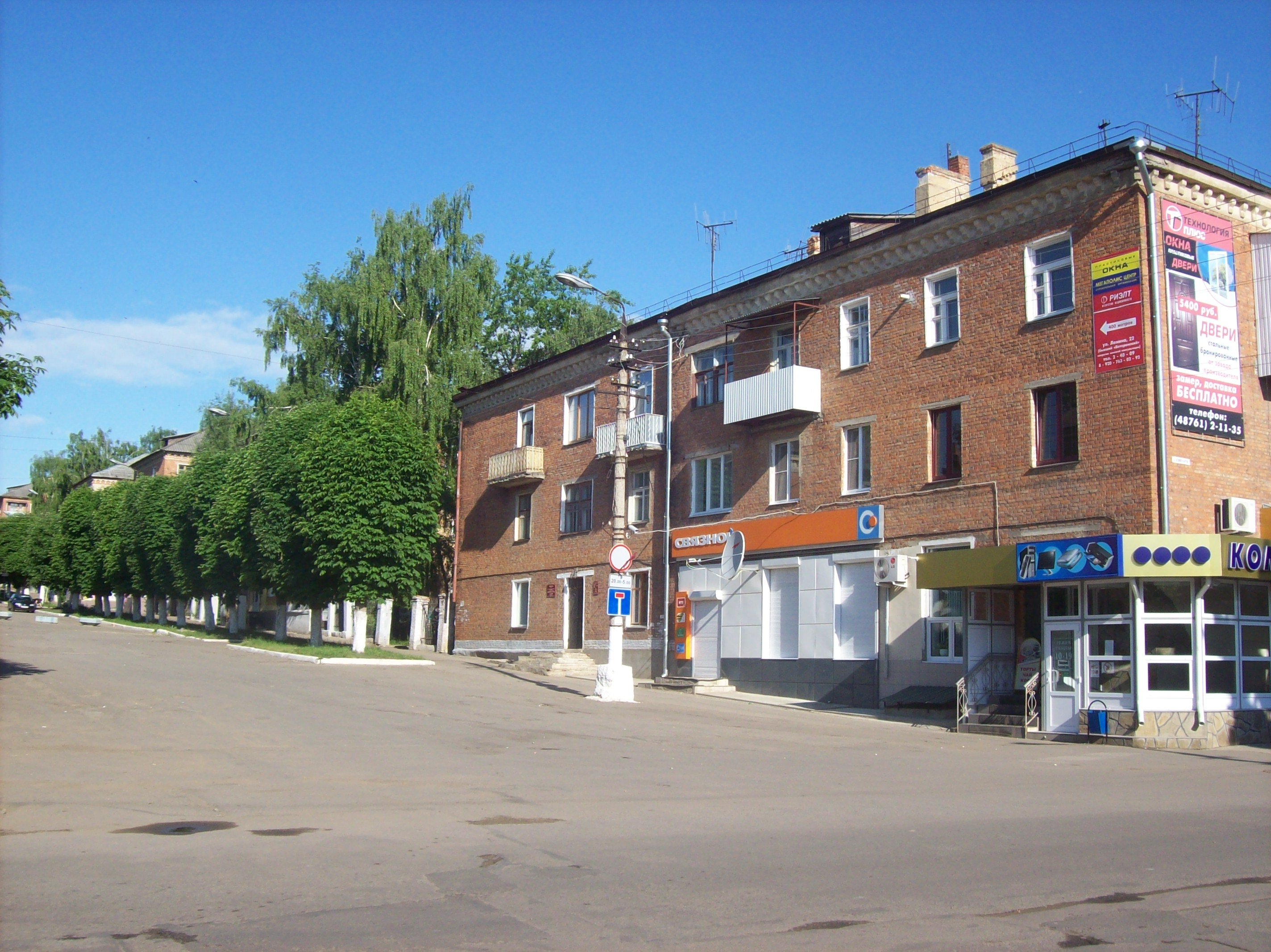
Building in the city center of Bogoroditsk

Within the framework of administrative divisions, Bogoroditsk serves as the administrative center of Bogoroditsky District. As an administrative division, it is incorporated within Bogoroditsky District as Bogoroditsk Town Under District Jurisdiction. As a municipal division, Bogoroditsk Town Under District Jurisdiction is incorporated within Bogoroditsky Municipal District as Bogoroditsk Urban Settlement.

== Twin towns and sister cities ==
Bogoroditsk is twinned with:

- Lučenec, Slovakia
- Rezzato, Lombardy, Italy

== Economy ==
In 2012, the technology company Varton bought an abandoned factory building and opened the assembly plant. By 2016, total investment in the LED lighting factory reached 1 billion rubles.
