= Bogoroditsky District =

Bogoroditsky District Богородицкий район (Russian)
- District
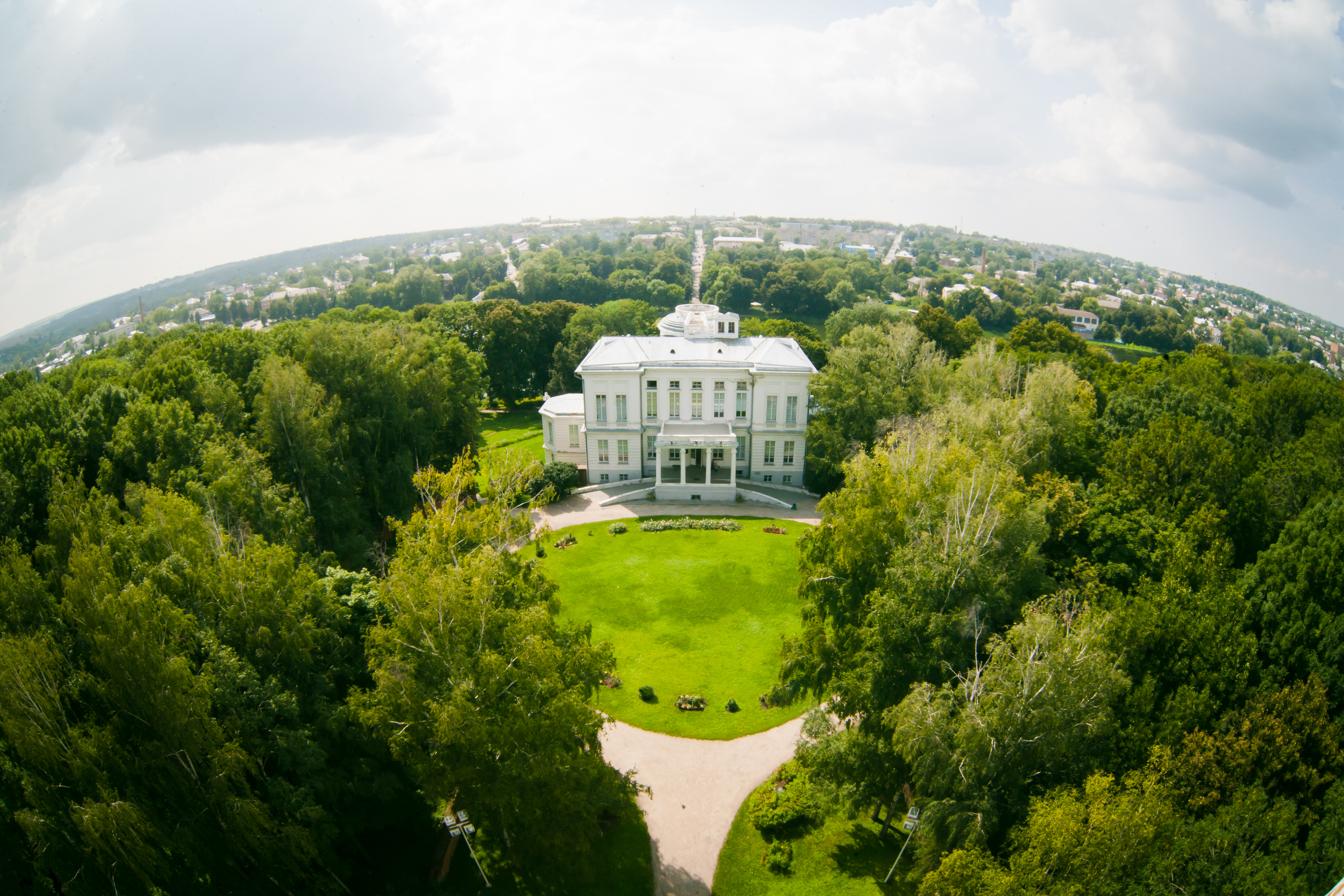
- A.T. Bolotova Historic Park, Bogoroditsky District

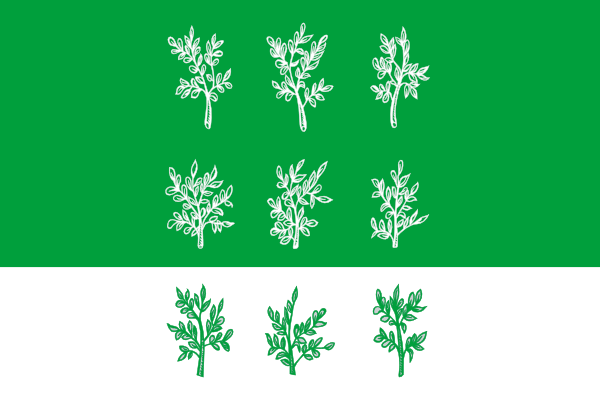
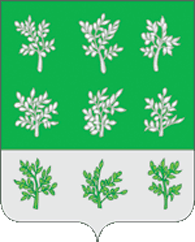
- Flag Coat of arms
- Location of Bogoroditsky District in Tula Oblast
- Coordinates: 53°46′N 38°08′E
- Country: Russia
- Federal subject: Tula Oblast
- Established: 13 May 1924
- Administrative center: Bogoroditsk

Area
  - Total: 957 km^{2} (369 sq mi)

Population (2010 Census)
  - Total: 51,643
  - Density: 54.0/km^{2} (140/sq mi)
  - Urban: 76.5%
  - Rural: 23.5%

Administrative structure
  - Administrative divisions: 1 Towns under district jurisdiction, 14 Rural okrugs
  - Inhabited localities: 1 cities/towns, 78 rural localities

Municipal structure
  - Municipally incorporated as: Bogoroditsky Municipal District
  - Municipal divisions: 1 urban settlements, 4 rural settlements
- Time zone: UTC+3 (MSK)
- OKTMO ID: 70608000
- Website: http://bogoroditsk.tularegion.ru/

Bogoroditsky District (Russian: Богоро́дицкий райо́н) is an administrative district (raion), one of the twenty-three in Tula Oblast, Russia. As a municipal division, it is incorporated as Bogoroditsky Municipal District. It is located in the east of the oblast. The area of the district is 957 square kilometers (369 sq mi). Its administrative center is the town of Bogoroditsk. Population: 51,643 (2010 Census); 11,543 (2002 census); 15,002 (1989 Soviet census). The population of Bogoroditsk accounts for 61.8% of the district's total population.
