= Slavny, Tula Oblast =

Municipality in Tula Oblast

Slavny Славный
- Work settlement
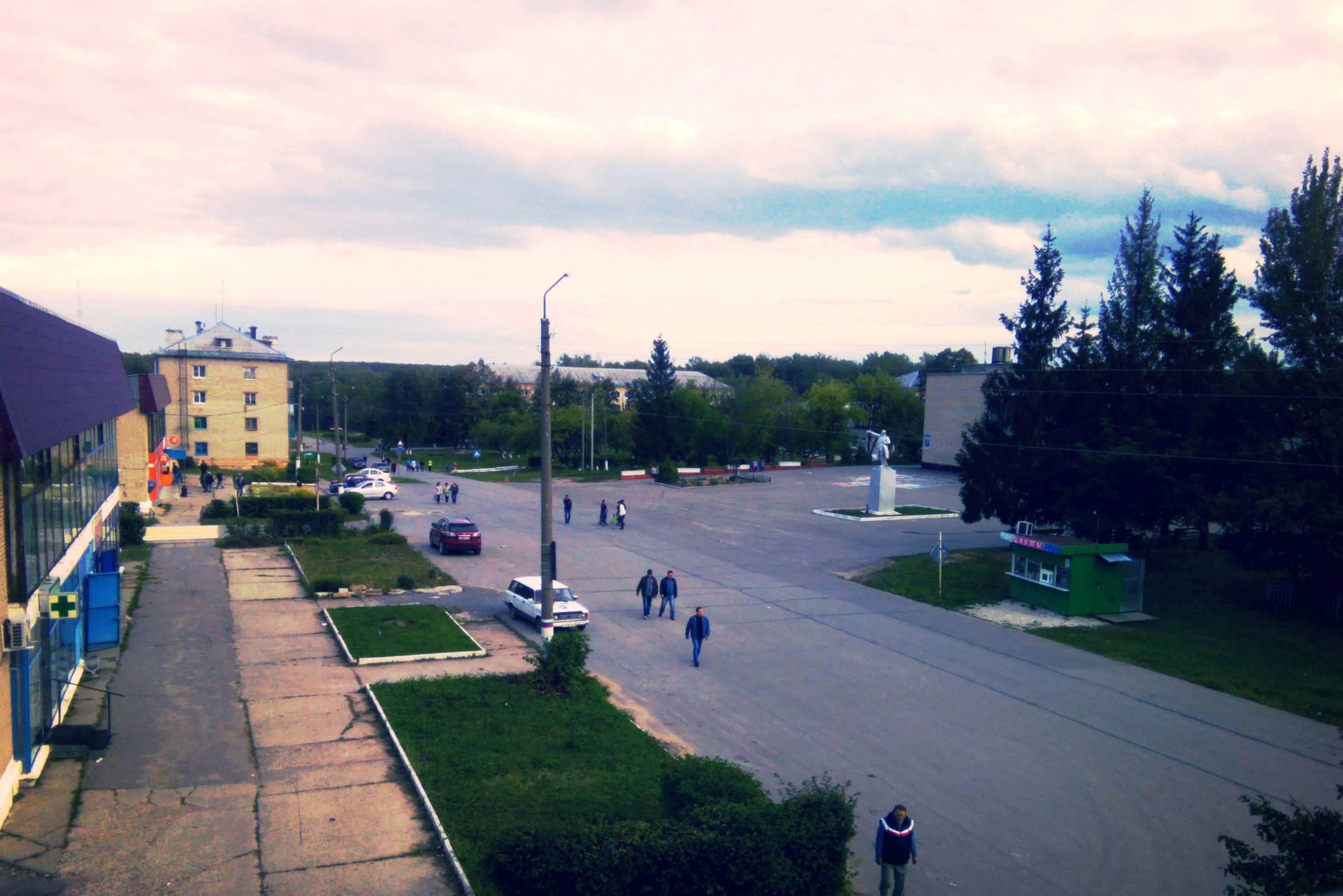
- A view of Slavny.

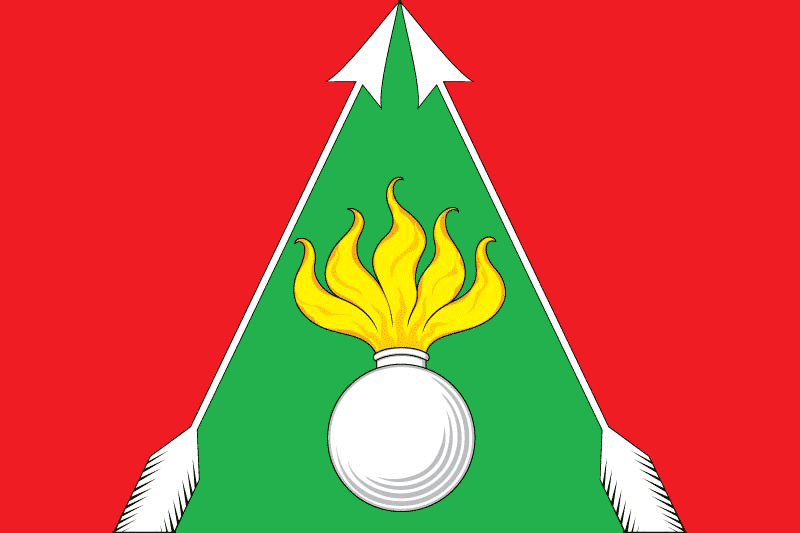
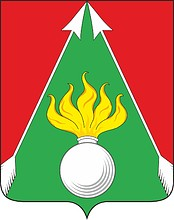
- Flag Coat of arms
- Interactive map of Slavny
- Location of Slavny Slavny (Tula Oblast)
- Coordinates: 53°32′44″N 36°28′30″E
- Country: Russia
- Federal subject: Tula Oblast
- Administrative district: Arsenyevsky District
- Founded: 1961

Population (2010 Census)
  - Total: 1,862
  - Estimate (2021): 1,894 (+1.7%)

Municipal status
  - Urban okrug: Slavny Urban Okrug
  - Capital of: Slavny Urban Okrug
- Time zone: UTC+3 (MSK)
- Postal code: 301505
- OKTMO ID: 70730000051
- Website: slavniy.tularegion.ru

Slavny (Russian: Сла́вный) is an urban locality (a work settlement) in Arsenyevsky District of Tula Oblast, Russia. Population: 1,862 (2010 census).

== Administrative and municipal status ==
Within the framework of administrative divisions, Slavny is incorporated within Arsenyevsky District as an urban-type settlement. As a municipal division, the work settlement of Slavny is incorporated as Slavny Urban Okrug.
