= Suvorovsky District =

Suvorovsky District Суворовский район (Russian)
- District
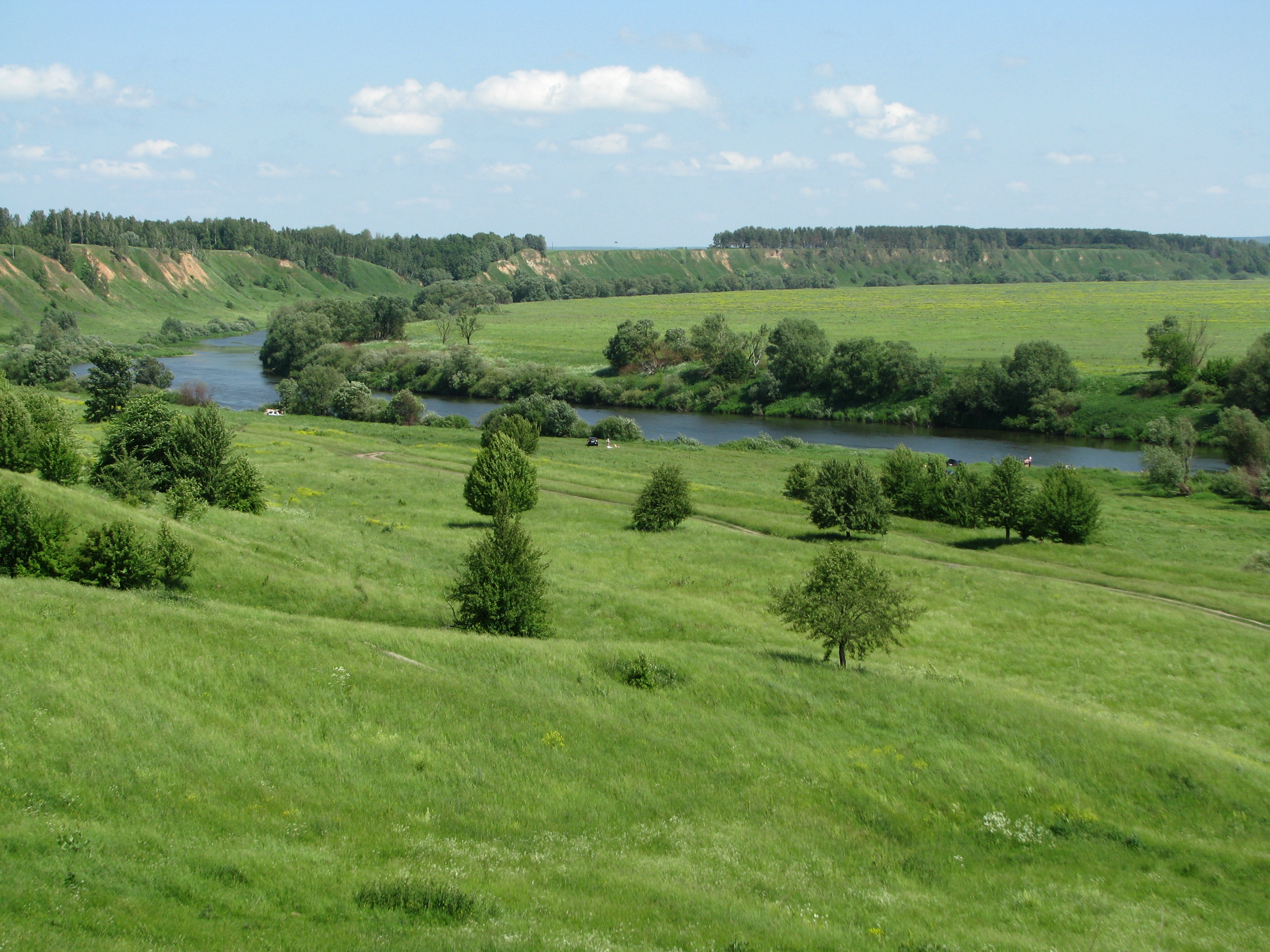
- Chekalin, View from the Monument, Suvorovsky District

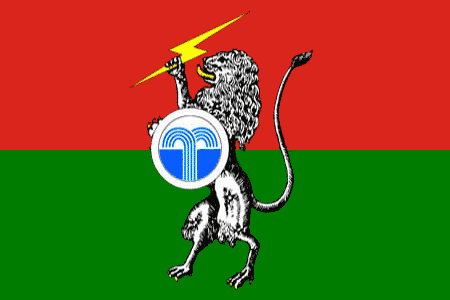
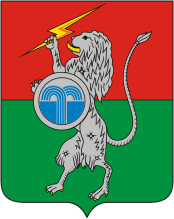
- Flag Coat of arms
- Location of Suvorovsky District in Tula Oblast
- Coordinates: 54°07′N 36°30′E
- Country: Russia
- Federal subject: Tula Oblast
- Established: 15 February 1944
- Administrative center: Suvorov

Area
  - Total: 1,065 km^{2} (411 sq mi)

Population (2010 Census)
  - Total: 37,637
  - Density: 35.34/km^{2} (91.53/sq mi)
  - Urban: 54.5%
  - Rural: 45.5%

Administrative structure
  - Administrative divisions: 2 Towns under district jurisdiction, 1 Urban-type settlements, 17 Rural territories
  - Inhabited localities: 2 cities/towns, 1 urban-type settlements, 140 rural localities

Municipal structure
  - Municipally incorporated as: Suvorovsky Municipal District
  - Municipal divisions: 3 urban settlements, 4 rural settlements
- Time zone: UTC+3 (MSK)
- OKTMO ID: 70640000
- Website: https://suvorov.tularegion.ru/

Suvorovsky District (Russian: Суво́ровский райо́н) is an administrative district (raion), one of the twenty-three in Tula Oblast, Russia. Within the framework of municipal divisions, it is incorporated as Suvorovsky Municipal District. It is located in the west of the oblast. The area of the district is 1,065 square kilometers (411 sq mi). Its administrative center is the town of Suvorov. Population: 37,637 (2010 Census); 41,838 (2002 census); 48,061 (1989 Soviet census). The population of Suvorov accounts for 50.4% of the district's total population.
