= Plavsky District =

Plavsky District Плавский район (Russian)
- District
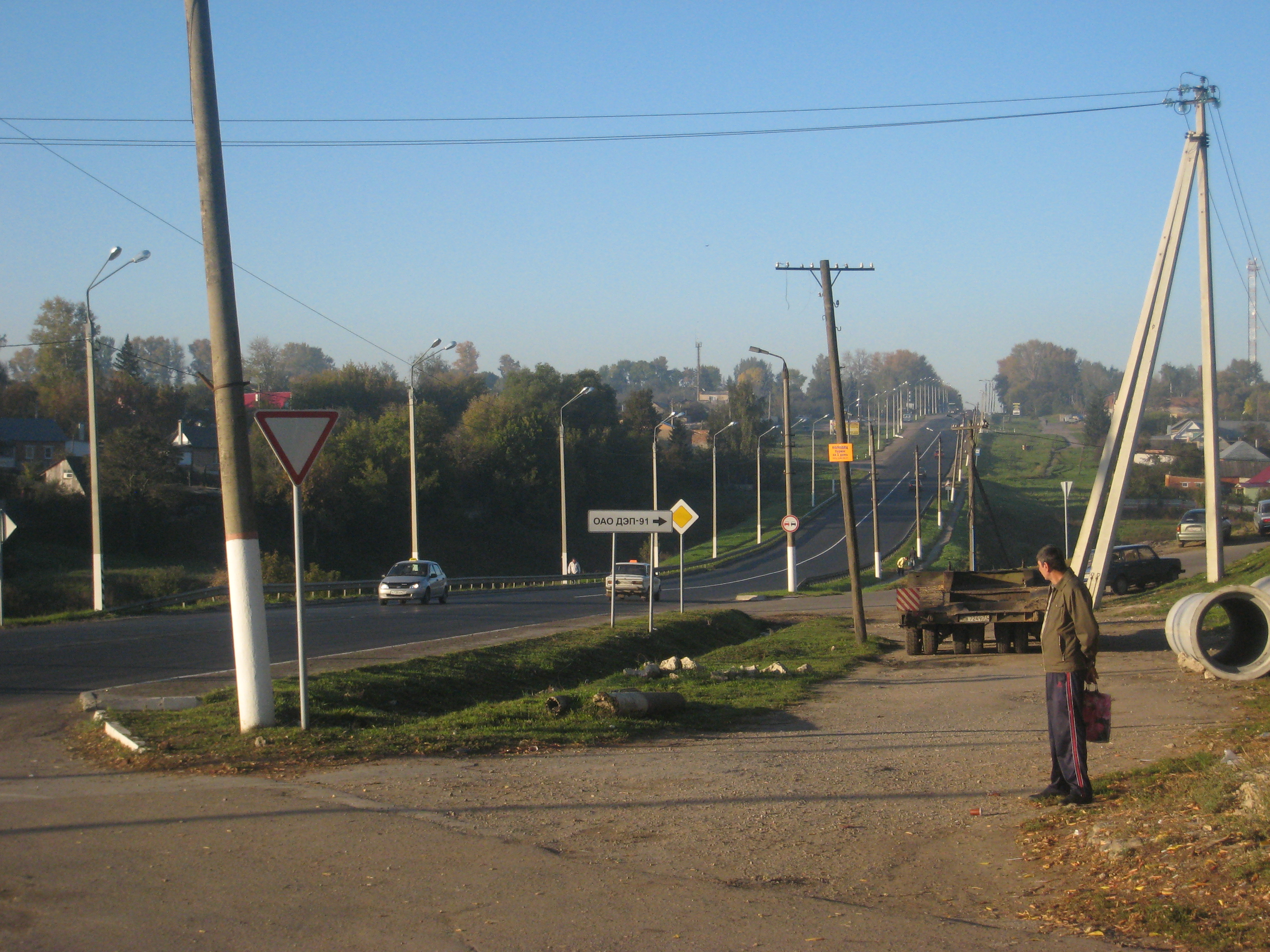
- Road from Moscow, Plavsky District

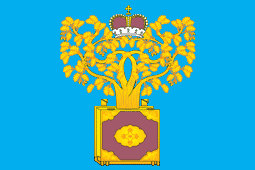
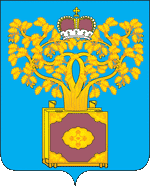
- Flag Coat of arms
- Location of Plavsky District in Tula Oblast
- Coordinates: 53°42′N 37°18′E
- Country: Russia
- Federal subject: Tula Oblast
- Established: 1924
- Administrative center: Plavsk

Area
  - Total: 1,024.6 km^{2} (395.6 sq mi)

Population (2010 Census)
  - Total: 27,778
  - Density: 27.111/km^{2} (70.217/sq mi)
  - Urban: 58.2%
  - Rural: 41.8%

Administrative structure
  - Administrative divisions: 1 Towns under district jurisdiction, 13 Rural okrugs
  - Inhabited localities: 1 cities/towns, 107 rural localities

Municipal structure
  - Municipally incorporated as: Plavsky Municipal District
  - Municipal divisions: 1 urban settlements, 3 rural settlements
- Time zone: UTC+3 (MSK)
- OKTMO ID: 70638000
- Website: https://plavskiy.tularegion.ru/

Plavsky District (Russian: Пла́вский райо́н) is an administrative district (raion), one of the twenty-three in Tula Oblast, Russia. As a municipal division, it is incorporated as Plavsky Municipal District. It is located in the southwestern central part of the oblast. The area of the district is 1,024.6 square kilometers (395.6 sq mi). Its administrative center is the town of Plavsk. Population: 27,778 (2010 Census); 29,499 (2002 census); 29,484 (1989 Soviet census). The population of Plavsk accounts for 58.2% of the district's total population.
