= Arsenyevsky District =

Arsenyevsky District Арсеньевский район (Russian)
- District
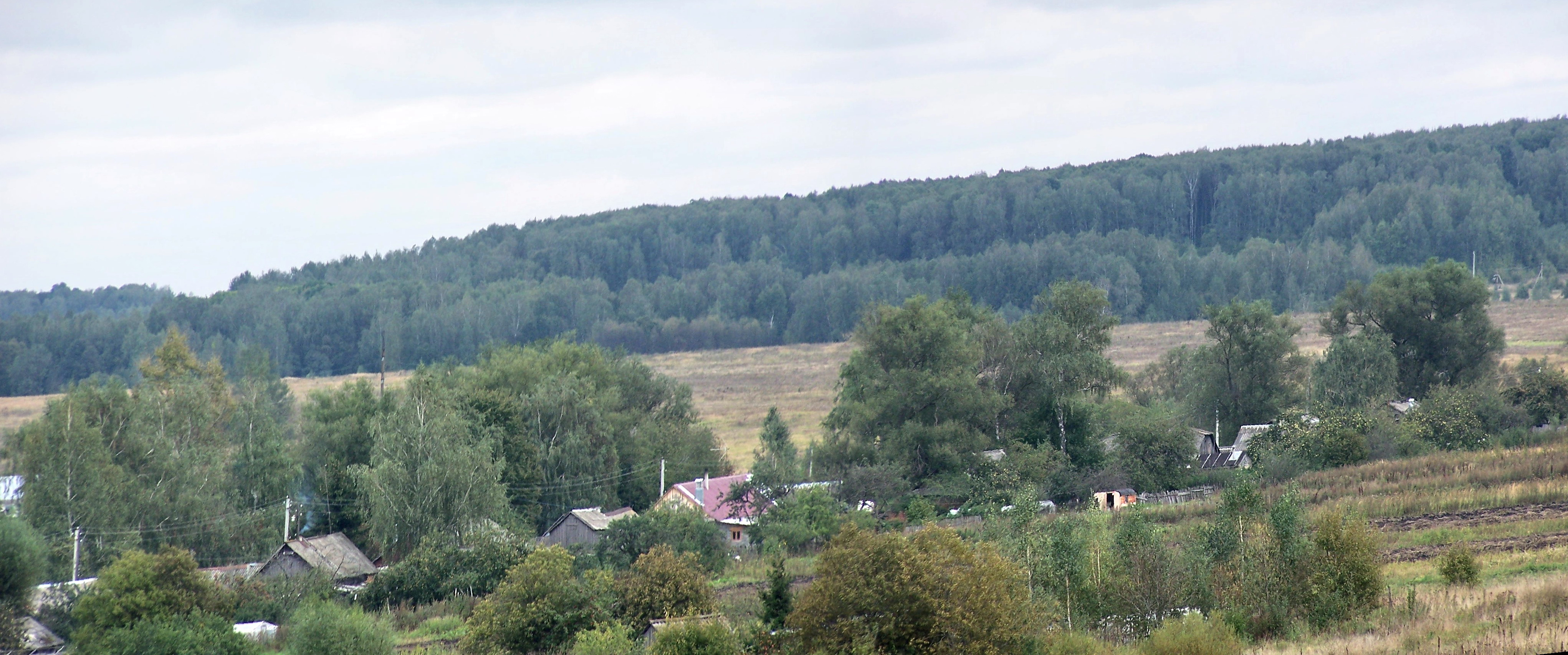
- Village Outskirts, Arsenyevsky District

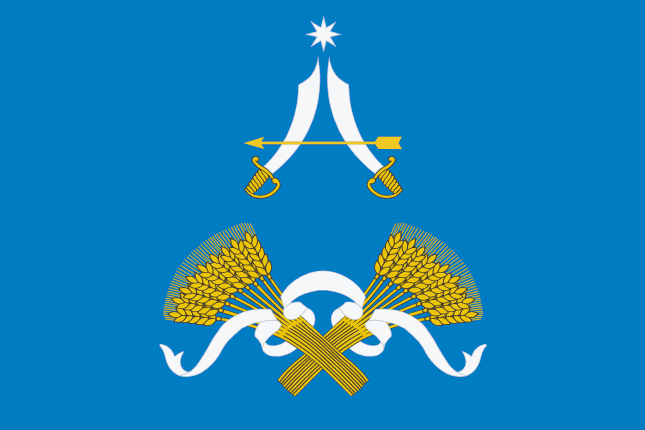
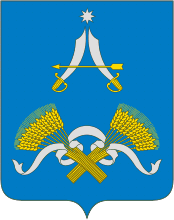
- Flag Coat of arms
- Location of Arsenyevsky District in Tula Oblast
- Coordinates: 53°44′24″N 36°39′15″E
- Country: Russia
- Federal subject: Tula Oblast
- Administrative center: Arsenyevo

Area
  - Total: 1,096 km^{2} (423 sq mi)

Population (2010 Census)
  - Total: 12,209
  - Density: 11.14/km^{2} (28.85/sq mi)
  - Urban: 54.6%
  - Rural: 45.4%

Administrative structure
  - Administrative divisions: 2 Urban-type settlements, 13 Rural okrugs
  - Inhabited localities: 2 urban-type settlements, 103 rural localities

Municipal structure
  - Municipally incorporated as: Arsenyevsky Municipal District
  - Municipal divisions: 1 urban settlements, 2 rural settlements
- Time zone: UTC+3 (MSK)
- OKTMO ID: 70604000
- Website: http://arsenyevo.tularegion.ru/

Arsenyevsky District (Russian: Арсе́ньевский райо́н. Arsěńěvskij rajon) is an administrative district (raion), one of the twenty-three in Tula Oblast, Russia. It is located in the west of the oblast. The area of the district is 1,096 square kilometers (423 sq mi). Its administrative center is the urban locality (a work settlement) of Arsenyevo. Population: 12,209 (2010 Census); 12,730 (2002 census); 13,382 (1989 Soviet census). The population of Arsenyevo accounts for 39.3% of the district's total population.

== Administrative and municipal status ==
Within the framework of administrative divisions, Arsenyevsky District is one of the twenty-three in the oblast. The work settlement of Arsenyevo serves as its administrative center.

As a municipal division, the territory of the district is split between two municipal formations—Arsenyevsky Municipal District, to which the work settlement of Arsenyevo and 103 of the administrative district's rural localities belong, and Slavny Urban Okrug, which covers the rest of the administrative district's territory, including the urban-type settlement of Slavny.
