= Tarusa (disambiguation) =

Tarusa is a town in Tarussky District of Kaluga Oblast, Russia.

Tarusa may also refer to:

- Tarusa Urban Settlement, a municipal formation which the town of Tarusa in Tarussky District of Kaluga Oblast, Russia is incorporated as
- Tarusa (river), a river in Russia, a tributary of the Oka
- Principality of Tarusa, one of the medieval Upper Oka Principalities
