= Vorotynsk, Peremyshlsky District, Kaluga Oblast =

Vorotynsk Вороты́нск
- Rural locality
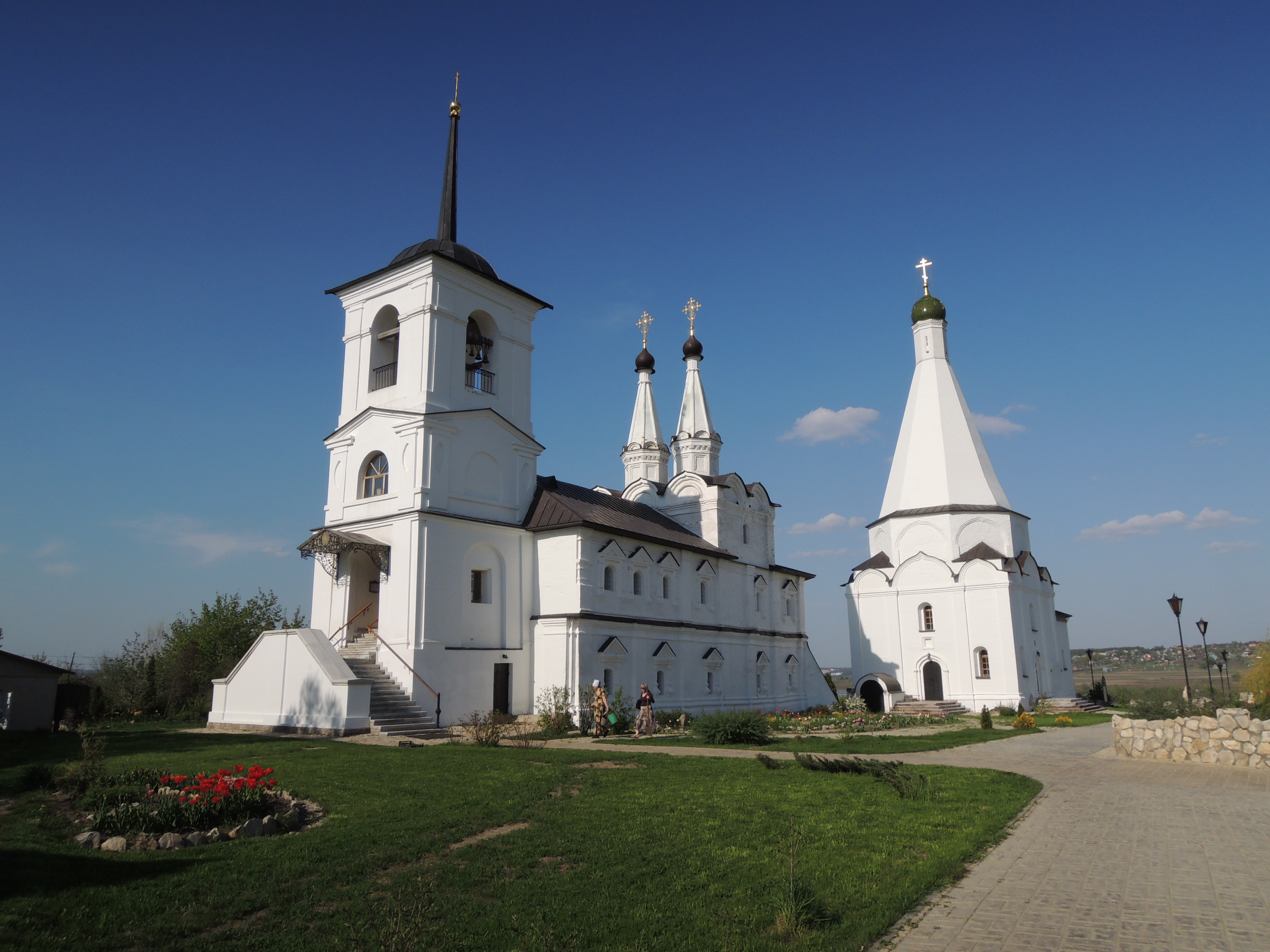
- Saviour Monastery
- Interactive map of Vorotynsk
- Location of Vorotynsk Vorotynsk (European Russia) Vorotynsk (Russia)
- Coordinates: 54°25′47″N 36°02′44″E
- Country: Russia
- Federal subject: Kaluga Oblast
- Administrative district: Peremyshlsky District
- First mentioned: 1155

Population
  - Estimate (2010): 168 )
- Time zone: UTC+3 (MSK)
- Postal code: 249120
- OKTMO ID: 29632412106

Vorotynsk (Russian: Вороты́нск) is a former town located 17 km south of Kaluga in the Ugra National Park. The town is thought to have been situated slightly downstream from the confluence of the Oka and the Ugra Rivers.

It was one of the Upper Oka towns and seat of the mediaeval Princes Vorotynsky. It was first mentioned in the Hypatian Codex under the year 1155. In the 14th century, it came under Lithuanian suzerainty as a fief. In 1480, Vorotynsk was the principal Tatar base during the Great standing on the Ugra river. In 1493, it passed under suzerainty of the Grand Duchy of Moscow.

The village of Spas-on-the-Oka, which now marks the spot, is dominated by Saviour Vorotynsk Monastery, founded by one Prince Vorotynsky in the early 16th century. It is noted for two rare churches with pyramidal roofs, one dating from the 1560s, and another from the 1640s. There are also two villages, New Vorotynsk and Old Vorotynsk, located just south-west from the modern town of Kaluga.

== See also ==
- Bibliography of Russian history
