= Principality of Belyov =

Feudal principality in Russia

Principality of Belyov Белёвское княжество (Russian)
- 1430s–1562
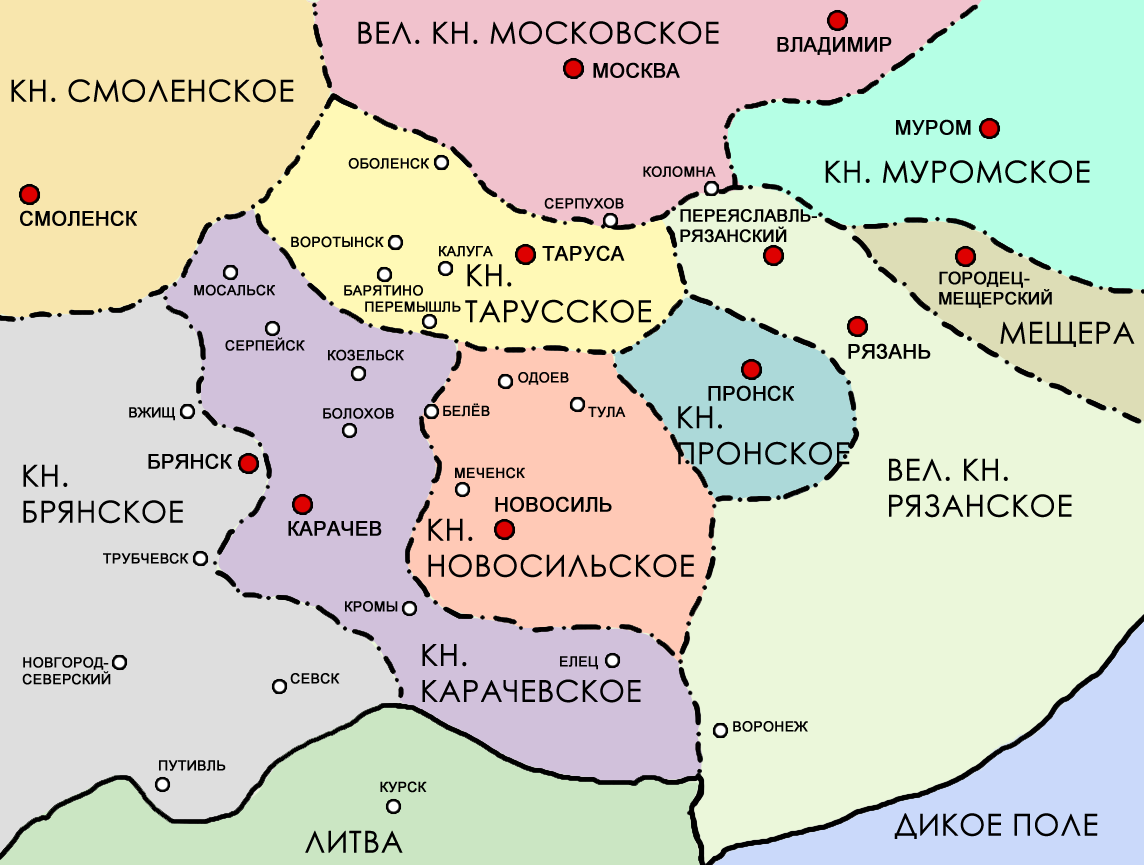
- Status: Principality
- Capital: Belyov
- Common languages: Russian
- Religion: Russian Orthodoxy
- Government: Monarchy
  - ?-? (first): Mikhail Vasilievich Belyovsky
  - 1558-1562 (last): Dmytro Ivanovych Vyshnevetsky
- History
  - Established: 1430s
  - Disestablished: 1562
| Preceded by | Succeeded by |
| Novosilsky principality; Odoyevsky principality | Tsardom of Russia |
- Today part of: Russia

Principality of Belyov was one of the Upper Oka Principalities from the 1430s to 1562. The town of Belyov was the centre of the principality.

== History ==
In the 1420s, Belyovsky and Vorotynsky udels arose from Novosilsky-Odoyevsky principality. After 1427, the princes of Belyov were underlings of Lithuania.

After 1432, the Belyovsky udel became the principality of Belyov. In 1437, a fighting happened near Belyov. Later, the principality was under the rule of Moscow, but in the middle of the 15th century it came back under Lithuanian rule. In 1492, the Principality of Belyov became a part of Moscow forever. The last prince of Belyov was Dmytro Ivanovych Vyshnevetsky, who lost his right to the principality in 1562.
