= Principality of Odoyev =

Russian principality (1376–1573)

Principality of Odoyev Одоевское княжество (Russian)
- 1376–1573
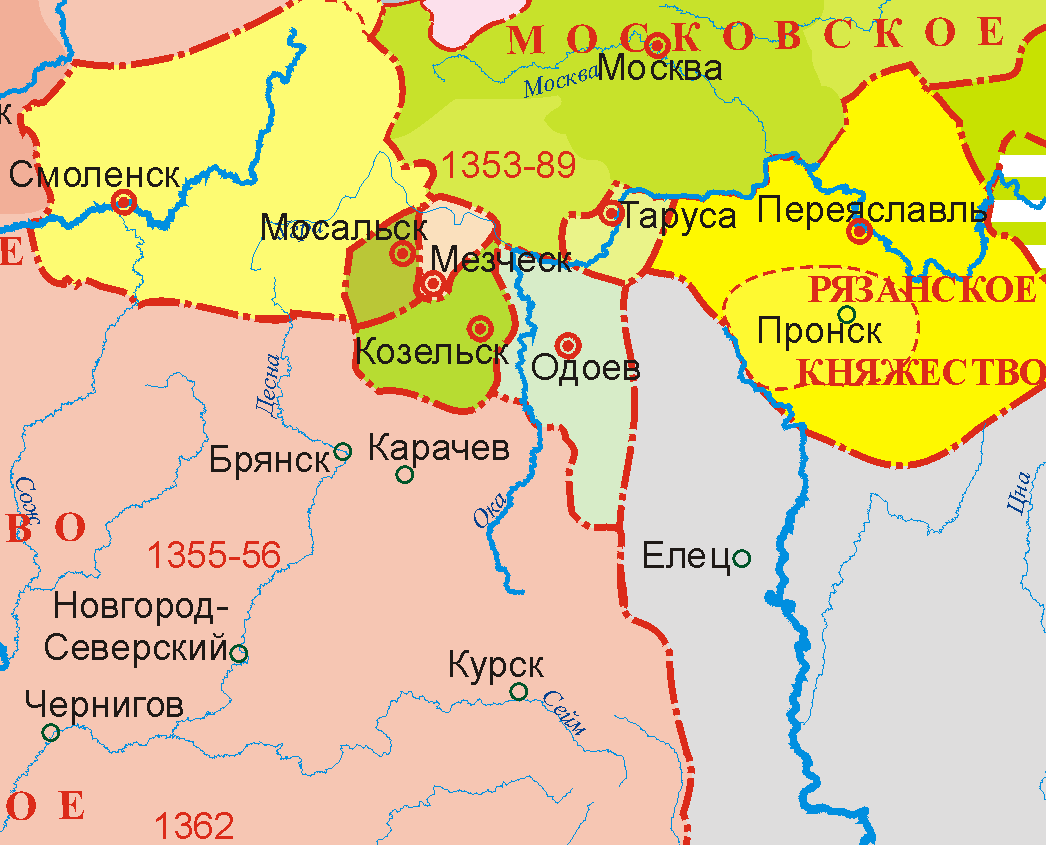
Upper Oka Principalities in 1389
Principality of Odoyev
Principality of Tarusa
Principality of Kozelsk
Principality of Masalsk
- Status: Principality
- Capital: Odoyev
- Common languages: Russian
- Religion: Russian Orthodoxy
- Government: Feudal monarchy
- History
  - Established: 1376
  - Disestablished: 1573
Succeeded by
Tsardom of Russia
- Today part of: Russia

The Principality of Odoyev (Russian: Одоевское княжество) was a late medieval Russian principality. It was one of the Upper Oka Principalities and it existed from 1376 to 1573. The town of Odoyev was the center of the principality.

From 1407, it was under the political authority of the Grand Duchy of Lithuania. During the 15th century, it disintegrated into a number of appanages belonging to the princes Vorotynsky and Odoyevsky. By the end of the century, it had passed to the Russian state, and the appanage princes finally lost their independence in 1573.

== History ==
The Principality of Novosil disintegrated into a number of appanages in the 14th century, one of which was Odoyev. The prince of Novosil, Roman Semyonovich, took part in the campaign against Tver in 1375, along with Grand Prince Dmitry of Moscow. In December, the Golden Horde devasted Novosil and the rest of the principality. The following year, Roman Semyonovich settled in Odoyev, although the principality may have separated after his death around 1402.

The princes of Odoyev called themselves princes of Novosil, and sometimes princes of Novosil and Odoyev until the late 14th century. They began to call themselves princes of Odoyev by the mid-16th century.

In 1407, the Lithuanians burned down Odoyev. As a result, it came under the political authority of the Grand Duchy of Lithuania. The principality was then ceded to the Lithuanians in 1427. The princes of Odoyev were granted extensive lands in Lithuania, but the Lithuanians continued to collect tribute from them annually.

Throughout the 15th century, the principality disintegrated into a number of appanages. In the late 15th and early 16th centuries, it was split between the Crimean Khanate, the Grand Duchy of Lithuania and the Grand Principality of Moscow.

In 1494, the principality was absorbed by Moscow. After its incorporation into the centralized Russian state, the princes Vorotynsky held the towns of Novosil and Peremyshl, while the princes Odoyevsky held Likhvin. Odoyev was divided between the two families. In 1573, the last prince, Nikita Romanovich, was beheaded during the oprichnina of Ivan the Terrible. The house of Odoyev died out in the 19th century.

== List of princes ==
- Roman Semyonovich Novosilsky (? — after 1402)
- Yuri Romanovich Chyorny Odoyevsky (? — after 1429)
- Ivan Yuryevich Odoevsky (? — about 1470)
- Semyon Yuryevich (? — 1473)
- Fyodor Ivanovich Odoyevsky (? — after 1497)
- Nikita Romanovich Odoyevsky (? — 1573)

== See also ==
- Odoyev

== Sources ==
- Boguslavsky, Vladimir V.; Kuksina, Elena I., eds. (2001). "Одоевское княжество". Славянская энциклопедия. Киевская Русь — Московия. Т. 2: Н—Я (in Russian). Moskva: ОЛМА Медиа Групп. p. 78. ISBN 978-5-224-02251-9.
- Wieczynski, Joseph L., ed. (1976). "Odoev, Principality of". The Modern Encyclopedia of Russian and Soviet History. Academic International Press. p. 197. ISBN 978-0-87569-064-3.
