= Obolenskoye =

Obolenskoye (Оболенское) is the name of several rural localities in Kaluga Oblast, Russia:

- Obolenskoye, Maloyaroslavetsky District, Kaluga Oblast, a selo in Maloyaroslavetsky District
- Obolenskoye, Zhukovsky District, Kaluga Oblast, a selo in Zhukovsky District
