= Upper Oka Principalities =

Collection of Russian principalities

The principalities at the turn of the 15th century

In Russian historiography, the Upper Oka Principalities, (Note: Russian: Верхнеокские княжества, romanized: Verkhneokskiye knyazhestva.) also known as the Upper Principalities or the Principalities of the Upper Reaches, (Note: Russian: Верховские княжества, romanized: Verkhovskiye knyazhestva.) were a number of small Russian principalities situated along the upper reaches of the Oka River around the turn of the 14th and 15th centuries.

== History ==
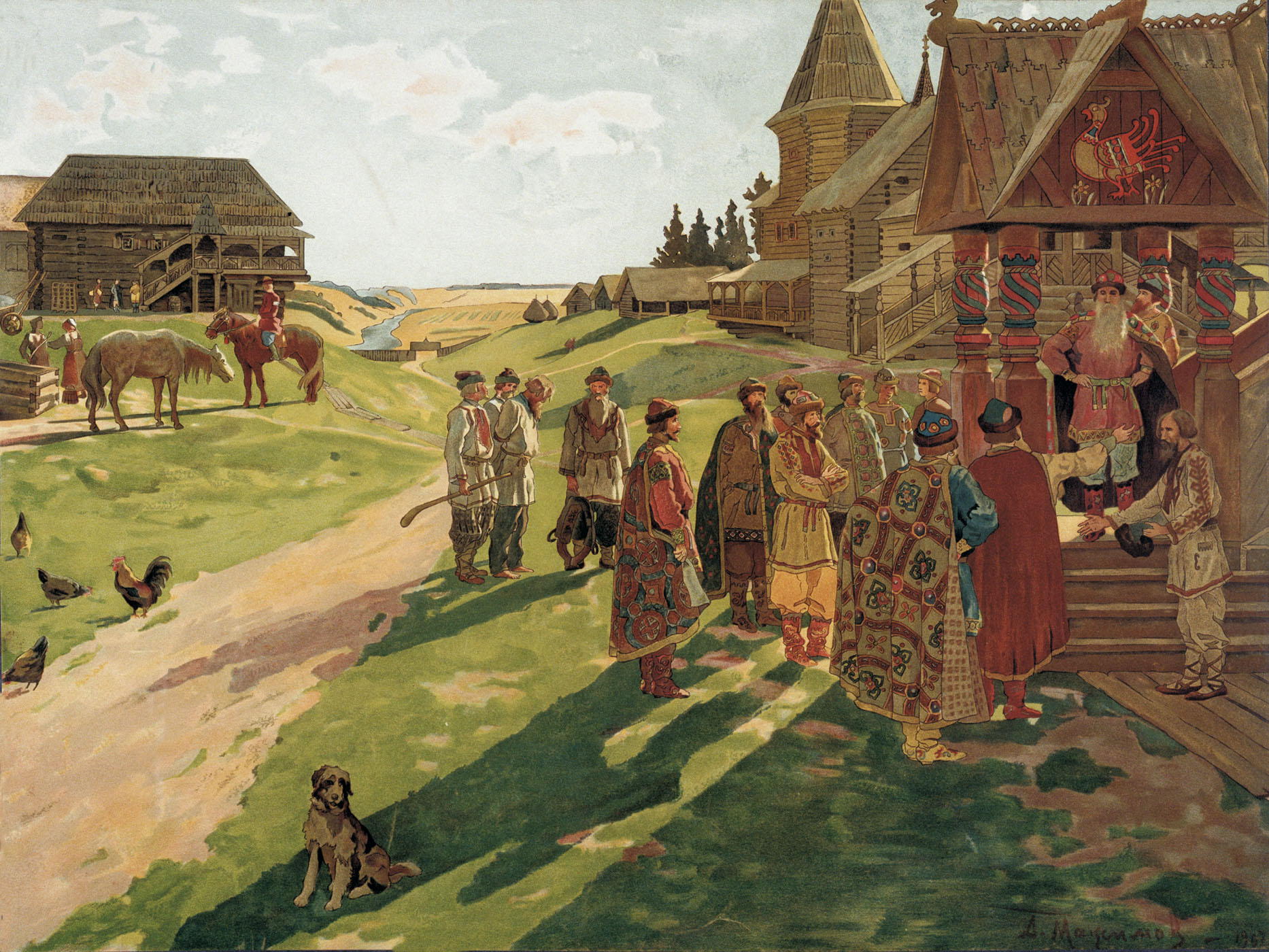
Estate of a petty medieval prince

They were formed between the 13th and 15th centuries as a result of the fragmentation of the Principality of Chernigov. They were ruled by the "upper princes", each descended from Mikhail Vsevolodovich. His eldest son, Roman, received Bryansk, and his line was considered senior. The Bryansk princes were crushed by the Golden Horde due to their aspirations for unification, leading to the emergence of independent appanage principalities in the mid-14th century.

From the mid-14th century, the principalities became buffer states between the Grand Duchy of Lithuania to the west and the Grand Principality of Moscow to the north; they fluctuated between alignments with each of these two major regional powers. Many princes became semi-dependent on Moscow, with the Diocese of Bryansk remaining subordinate to the metropolitan of the Russian Orthodox Church, who was based in Moscow.

The princes of Novosil and Tarusa participated in the all-Russian congress of princes in Pereslavl-Zalessky in 1374. The following year, the princes of Novosil, Tarusa, and Obolensk were mentioned as participating in the all-Russian campaign against Tver. Many of the "upper princes" also took part in the Battle of Kulikovo in 1380. However, around the turn of the 15th century, Lithuania renewed its campaign to increase its control over the region.

In the early 15th century, the princes became dependent on Lithuania and were required to pay an annual tribute. In 1395–1396 or 1406–1408, the Lithuanians were able to capture Obolensk, Tarusa, Mtsensk, Mosalsk, Vorotynsk, Mezetsk, Karachev, and Kozelsk. In 1408, the princes of Belyov and Peremyshl fled to Moscow, along with Švitrigaila and other princes. At the same time, the princes quarrelled with each other over the boundaries of their holdings. Increased Lithuanian oppression in the territories bordering Muscovite lands led to discontent among Russian princes and nobles. The principalities of Karachev, Kozelsk, and Tarusa were abolished; the descendants of those princes were reduced to the status of minor service princes.

In the second half of the 15th century, as religious oppression intensified, Grand Prince Ivan III took advantage of the situation and began to interfere in the relations of the princes who were in Lithuanian service. As a result, these princes began to "depart" to Moscow. A border conflict between Lithuania and Russia took place in 1487–1494, consisting of minor clashes and generally waged by the forces of the border principalities. According to a 1494 treaty, Lithuania was compelled to recognize these principalities as belonging to the Russian state. The incorporation of these principalities strengthened Moscow's southwestern border, and some of them continued to exist as appanages until 1573, including Vorotynsk, Novosil, and Odoyev.

== List of principalities ==
- Principality of Odoyev and Principality of Novosil – seats of the Odoyevsky princes in Odoyev and Novosil;
- Principality of Belyov – seat of the Belyovsky princes in Belyov;
- Principality of Vorotynsk – seat of the Vorotynsky princes in Vorotynsk;
- Principality of Mosalsk – seat of the Mosalsky princes in Mosalsk;
- Principality of Zvenigorod – seat of the Zvenigorodsky princes;
- Principality of Karachev – seat of the Khotetovsky princes in Karachev;
- Principality of Kozelsk and Principality of Peremyshl – seats of the Gorchakov princes in Kozelsk and Peremyshl;
- Principality of Tarusa and Principality of Mezetsk – seats of the Mezetsky princes in Tarusa and Meshchovsk;
- Principality of Boryatino – seat of the Boryatinsky princes in Boryatino;
- Principality of Obolensk – seat of the Obolensky princes in Obolensk.

== Gallery ==
Maps of the Upper Oka Principalities
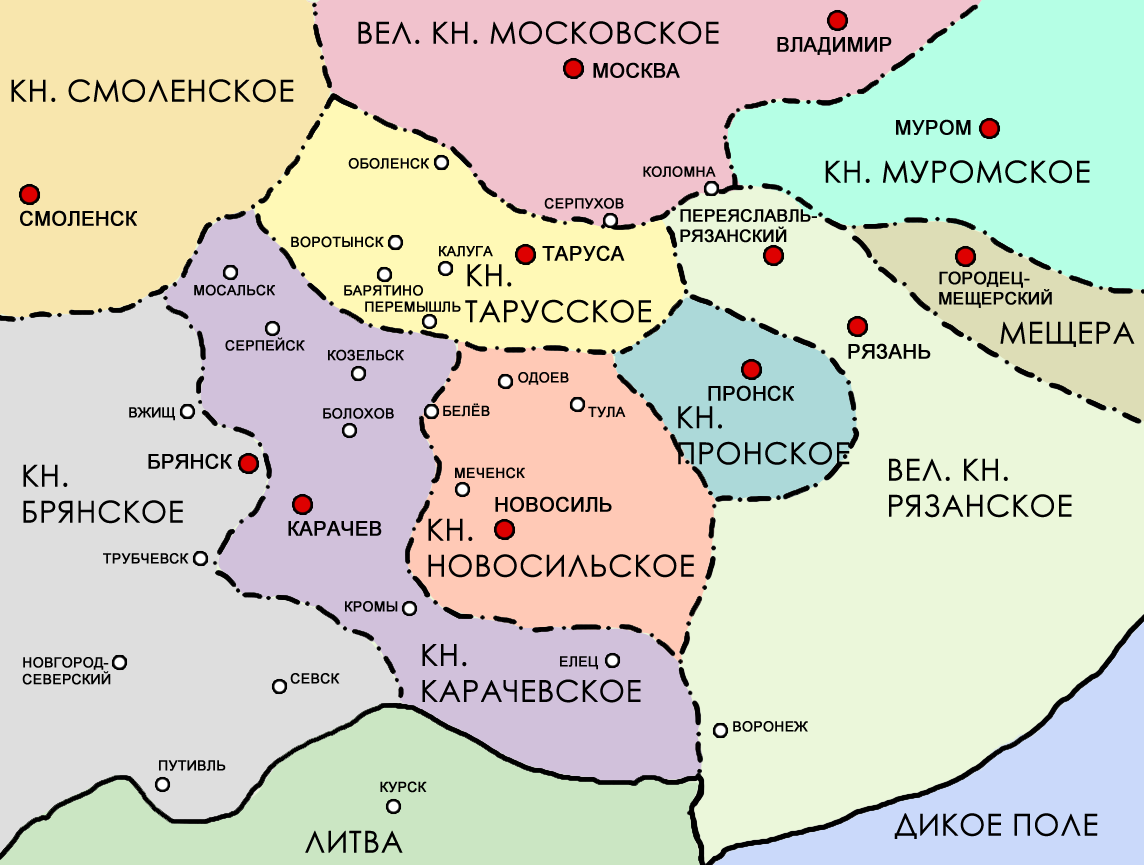
Early principalities on the Upper Oka c. 1300
Principality of Tarusa
Principality of Novosil
Principality of Karachev

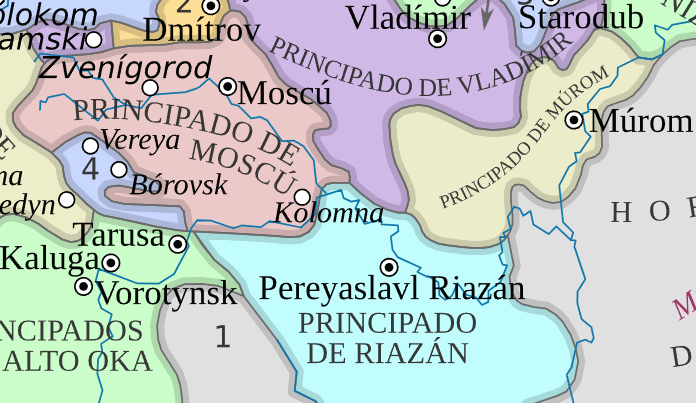
Upper Oka Principalities c. 1350

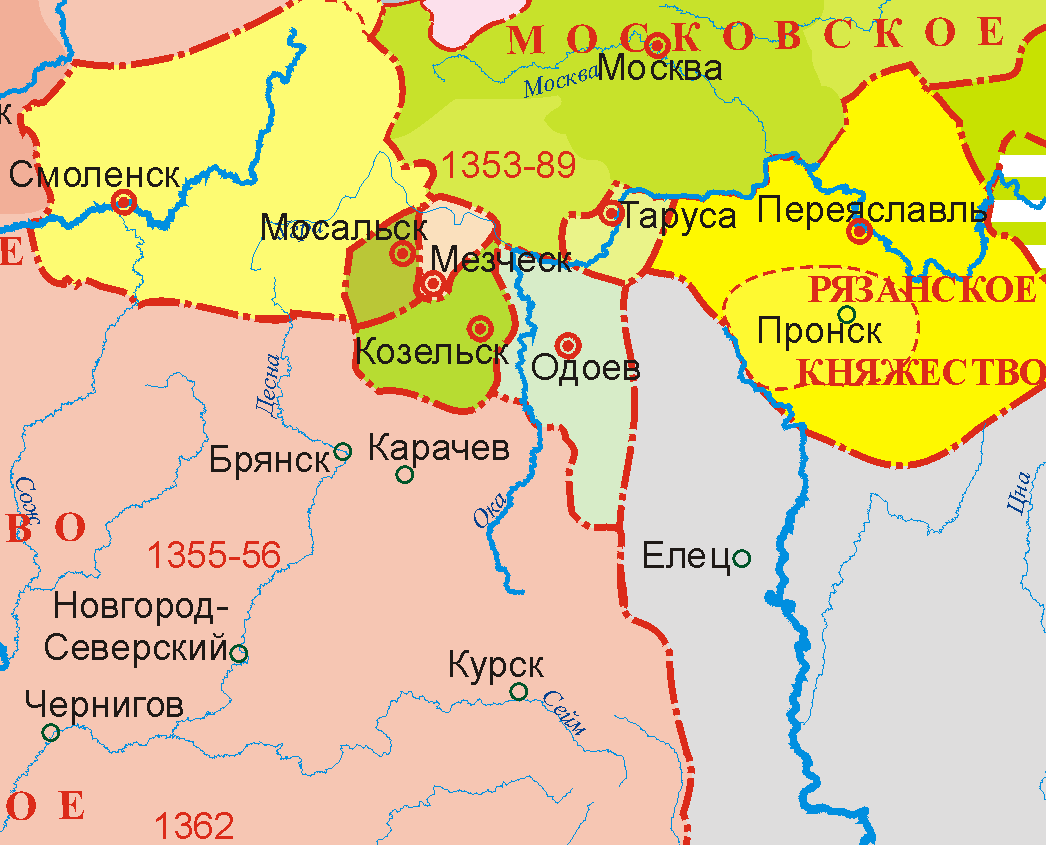
Upper Oka Principalities in 1389
Principality of Odoyev
Principality of Tarusa
Principality of Kozelsk
Principality of Masalsk

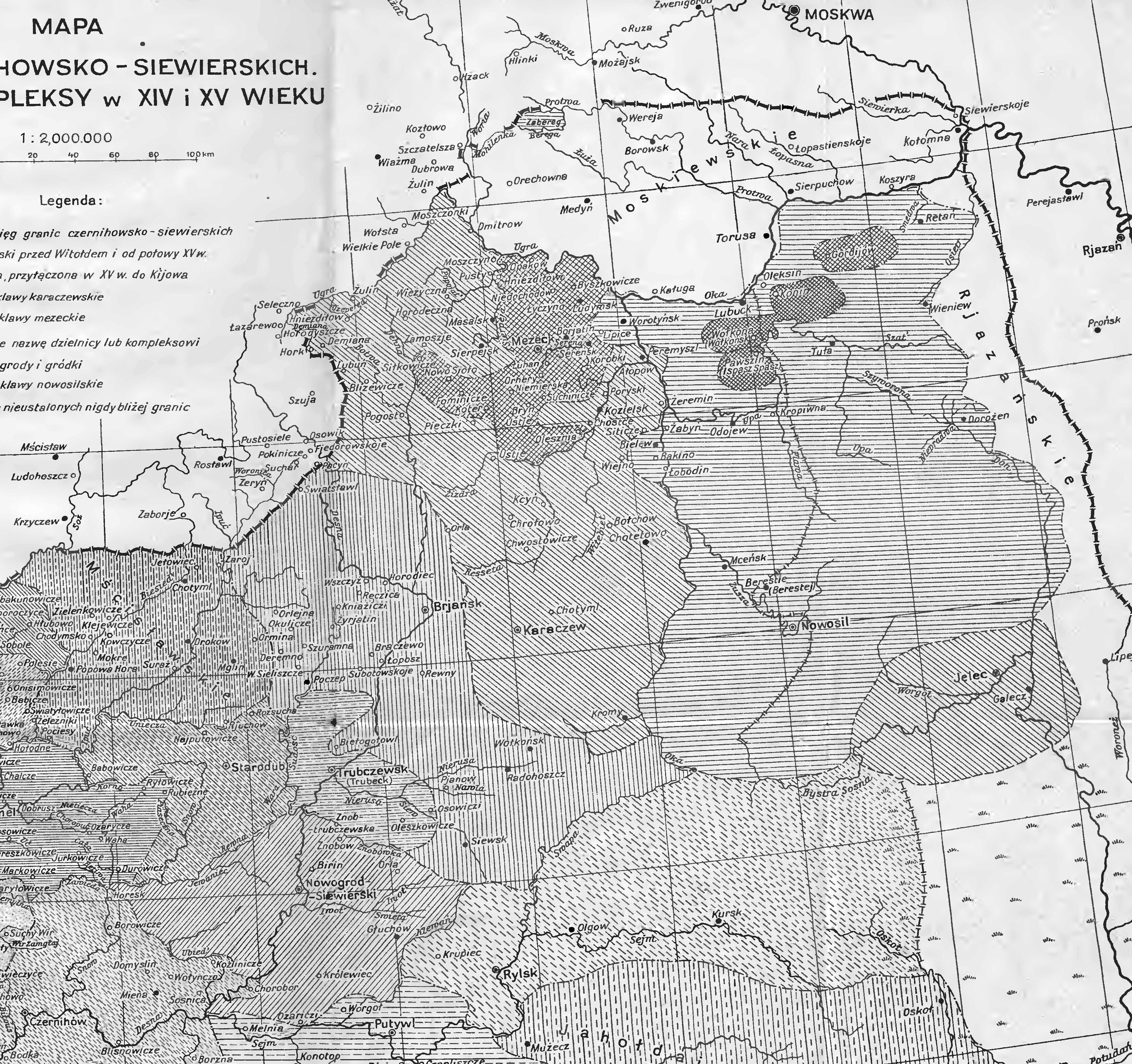
Upper Oka Principalities c. 1400

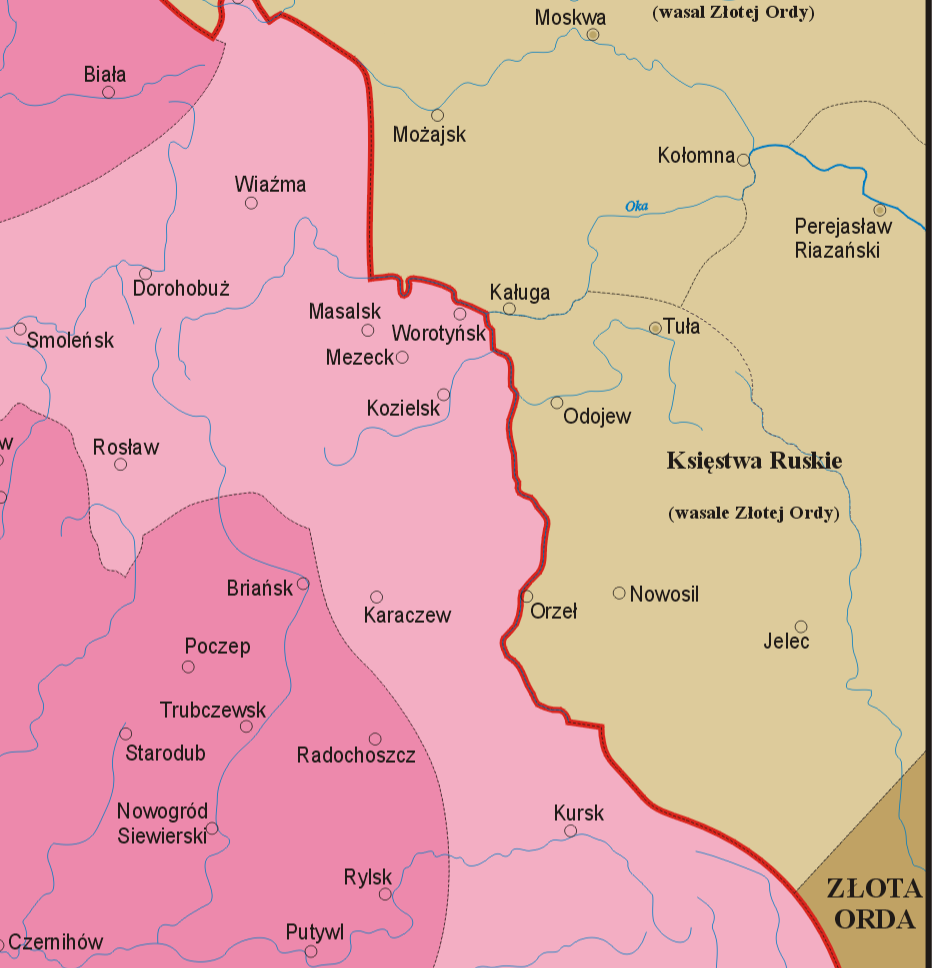
Upper Oka Principalities in 1434
Grand Duchy of Lithuania
Vassals of the Golden Horde

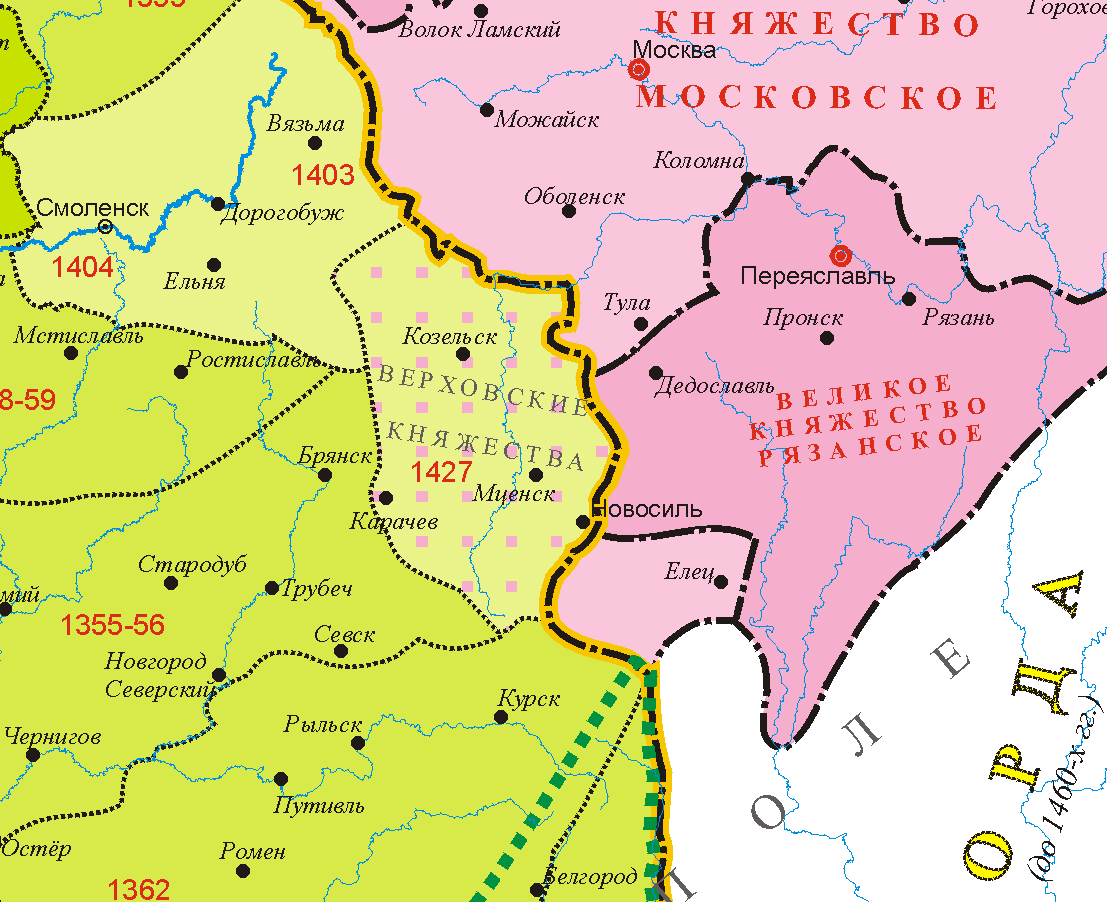
Upper Oka Principalities in 1462
Grand Duchy of Lithuania
Principality of Ryazan
Grand Principality of Moscow
Golden Horde

== Sources ==
- Boguslavsky, Vladimir V.; Kuksina, Elena I. (2001). "Верховские княжества". Славянская энциклопедия. Киевская Русь — Московия. Т. 1: А–М (in Russian). Moskva: ОЛМА Медиа Групп. pp. 171–172. ISBN 9785224022502.
- Kashtanov, S. M. (1986). "Upper Reaches, Principalities of". The Modern Encyclopedia Of Russian and Soviet History. Vol. 41. Academic International Press. pp. 97–98.
- Rusyna, Olena Volodymyrivna (2003). Верховські князі [Upper princes]. Encyclopedia of History of Ukraine (in Ukrainian). Vol. 1. Kyiv: Institute of History of Ukraine. ISBN 966-00-0734-5. У 2-й пол. 14 – 70-х рр. 15 ст. володіння в.К., що лежали у поріччі верхньої Оки (прит. Волги), відігравали роль буфера між сферами впливу литов. і моск. князів.
