= Tarusa =

Tarusa Таруса
- Town
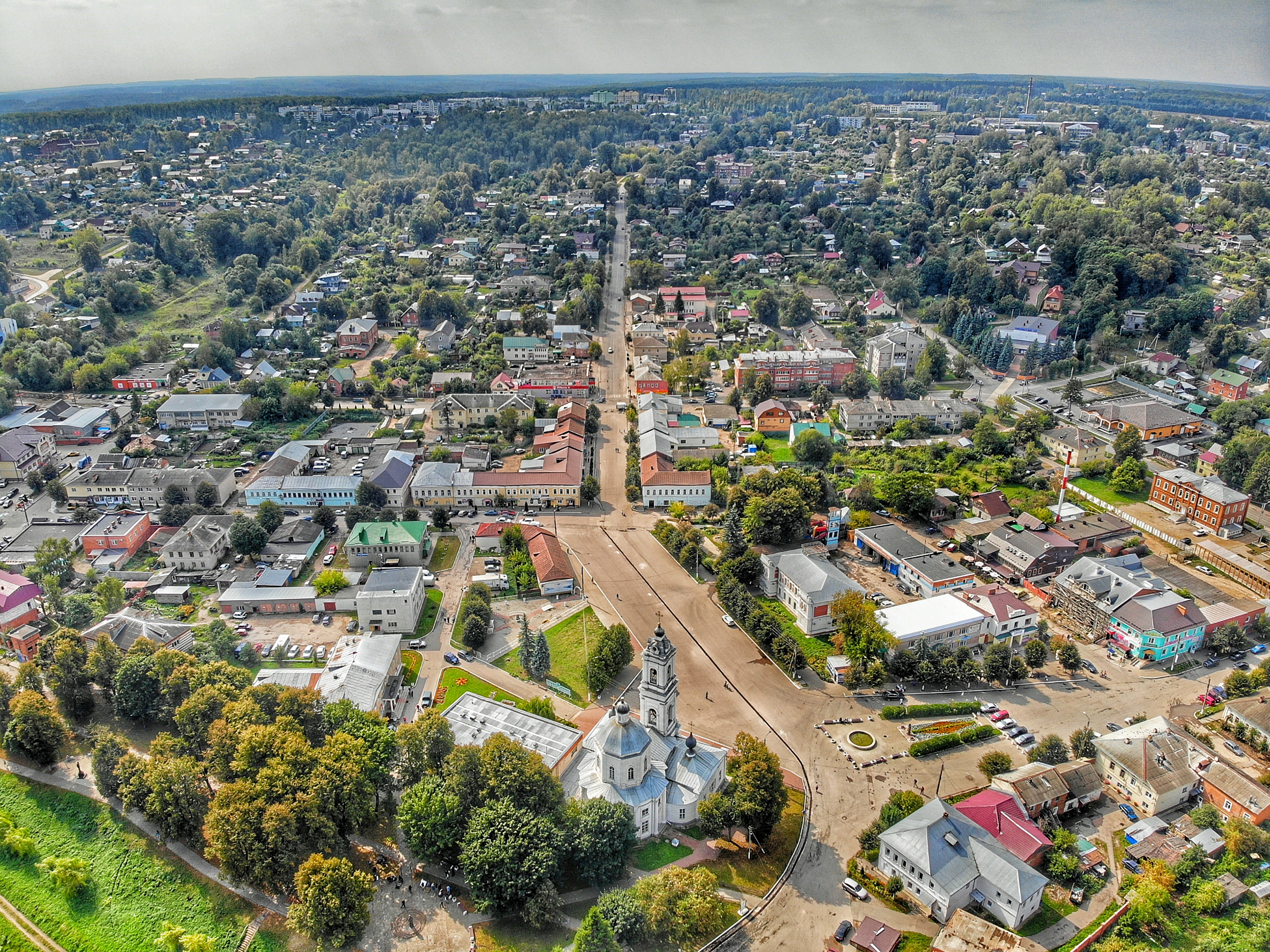
- Tarusa central square

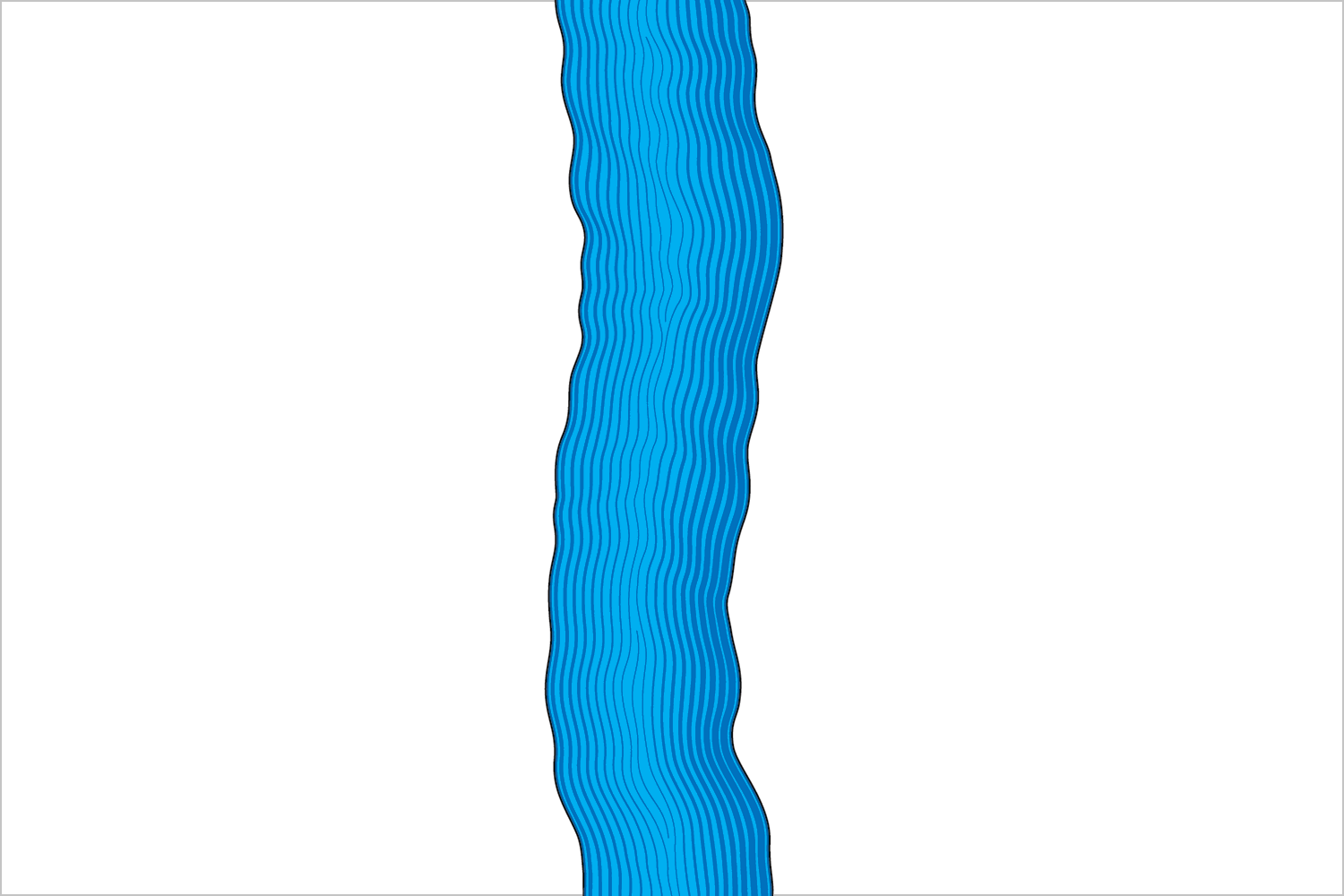
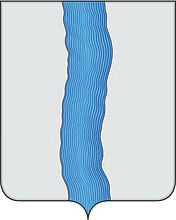
- Flag Coat of arms
- Interactive map of Tarusa
- Location of Tarusa Tarusa (Kaluga Oblast)
- Coordinates: 54°44′N 37°11′E
- Country: Russia
- Federal subject: Kaluga Oblast
- Administrative district: Tarussky District
- First mentioned: 1246
- Elevation: 140 m (460 ft)

Population (2010 Census)
  - Total: 9,660
  - Estimate (2023): 9,791 (+1.4%)

Administrative status
  - Capital of: Tarussky District

Municipal status
  - Municipal district: Tarussky Municipal District
  - Urban settlement: Tarusa Urban Settlement
  - Capital of: Tarussky Municipal District, Tarusa Urban Settlement
- Time zone: UTC+3 (MSK)
- Postal codes: 249100, 249101
- OKTMO ID: 29638101001
- Website: mo.tarusa.ru

Tarusa (Russian: Тару́са) is a town and the administrative center of Tarussky District in Kaluga Oblast, Russia, located on the left bank of the Oka River, 76 kilometers (47 mi) northeast of Kaluga, the administrative center of the oblast. Population: 9,918 (2021 census); 9,660 (2010 census); 9,893 (2002 census); 8,795 (1989 Soviet census).

== Etymology ==
The name is from that of the Tarusa River, a tributary of the Oka; Tar- is a hydronym base characteristic of regions of ancient Baltic settlement. According to a popular belief, the name derives from Tarusa's geohistorical position as a border town to the adjoining realm of Lithuania situated on the bank of the Oka. Questions about travelers' whereabouts from the other bank were answered with the answer To—Rus!, meaning "that is Russia," eventually becoming the name of the town.

== History ==
Tarusa is known to have existed since 1246, when it was the capital of one of the Upper Oka Principalities—the Principality of Tarusa. The first ruler of this principality was Grand Duke Yury Mikhailovich, the son of Grand Duke Mikhail Vsevolodovich of Chernigov. Later, the local rulers moved their seats to Meshchovsk and Boryatino, and Tarusa was subjugated by the Grand Duchy of Moscow in the late 14th century. In the mid-15th century, Tarusa passed to Lithuania, and later on it fell back to the Grand Duchy of Moscow. In the 16th century, it was fortified with ramparts and trenches in defense against the Crimean Tatars and Nogai Horde. In 1876, there were 40 craftsmen and 7 small factories in Tarusa.

Soviet authority in Tarusa was established on December 27, 1917. In the following years, the town's churches were closed and a monument to Stalin was erected on the central square. During World War II, German troops approached Tarusa and took it on their way to Moscow. The town was occupied by the Germans between October 24 and December 19, 1941. After that, the town was retaken by the Red Army which crossed the Oka River in winter under the frantic German fire and successfully attacked the German strongholds on the higher bank of Oka. Remnants of the town's fortifications and the town wall can still be seen today in the community park near the Peter and Paul Cathedral.

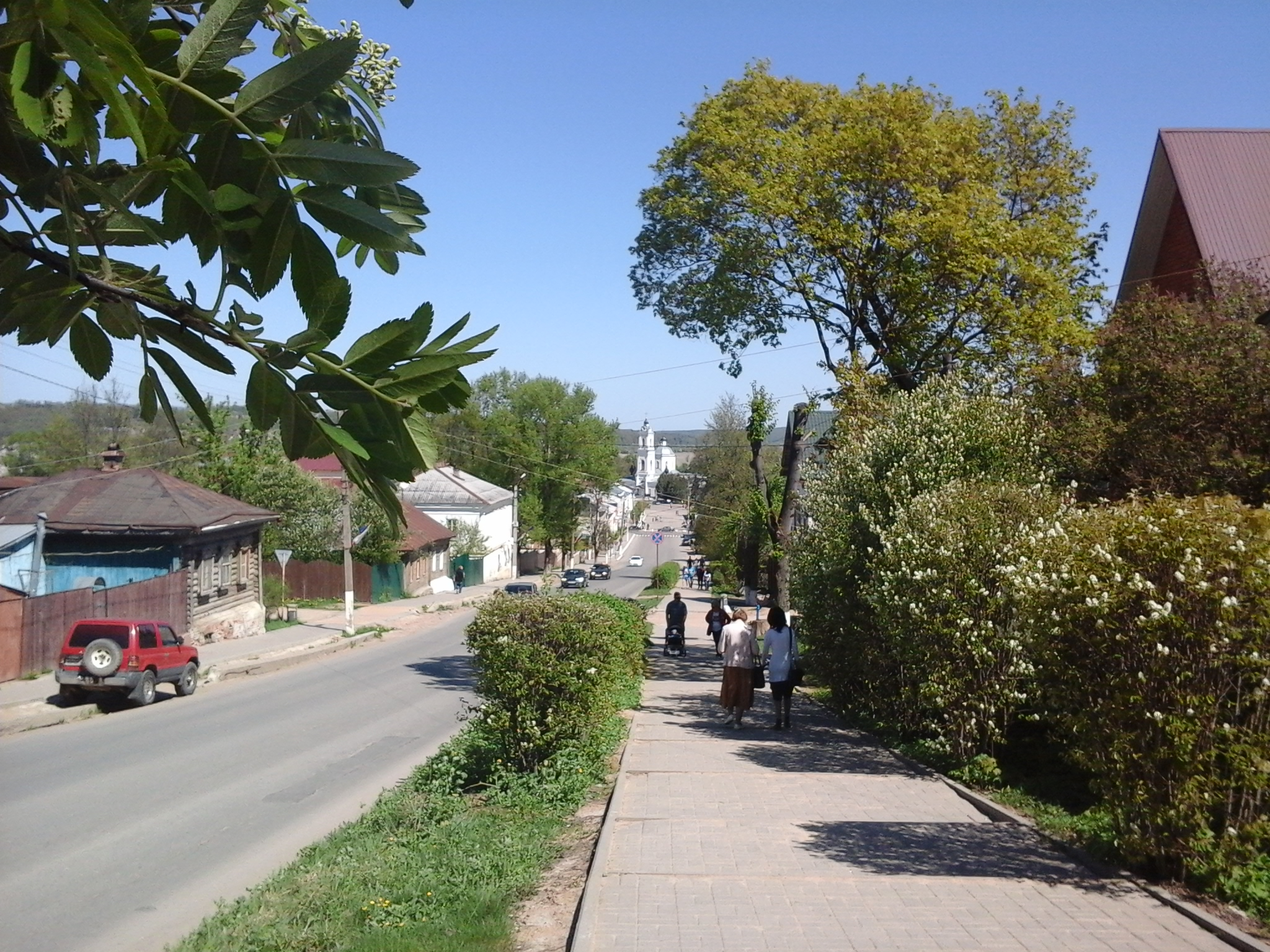
Lenin st. in Tarusa

During the Soviet period, Tarusa became the place where many dissidents and people repressed by the Soviet authorities used to settle. Tarusa became the home place for such famous dissident figures as Anatoly Marchenko, Larisa Bogoraz, Gleb Yakunin, Pavel Litvinov, Alexander Ginzburg, Andrey Amalrik, Sergei Kovalev, Zoya Krakhmalnikova, Lev Kopelev, and Frida Vigdorova. The book Tarusa - the 101st kilometer by Tatyana Melnikova is devoted to the lives and fates of the dissidents who lived in Tarusa.

In 1961, Konstantin Paustovsky fought to publish his famous Tarusa Pages, which became the only book in the Soviet Union which escaped Moscow-based central party censorship and offered its pages for various free-thinking and dissident writers. After the book was published, it was declared ideologically harmful and removed from all bookstores and libraries. The director of the Kaluga publishing house was reprimanded, the editor-in-chief was fired, and other repressions were to follow. It was only Paustovsky's personal appeal to Nikita Khrushchev that stopped the wave of planned repressions. Nevertheless, the Tarusa Pages became a significant and meaningful event in the Soviet literature. The book introduced to the public such authors as Bulat Okudzhava, Vladimir Maksimov, Frida Vigdorova, Nadezhda Mandelstam, and Naum Korzhavin, who enjoyed immense popularity in the later years.

== Administrative and municipal status ==
Within the framework of administrative divisions, Tarusa serves as the administrative center of Tarussky District, to which it is directly subordinated. As a municipal division, the town of Tarusa is incorporated within Tarussky Municipal District as Tarusa Urban Settlement.

== Culture ==
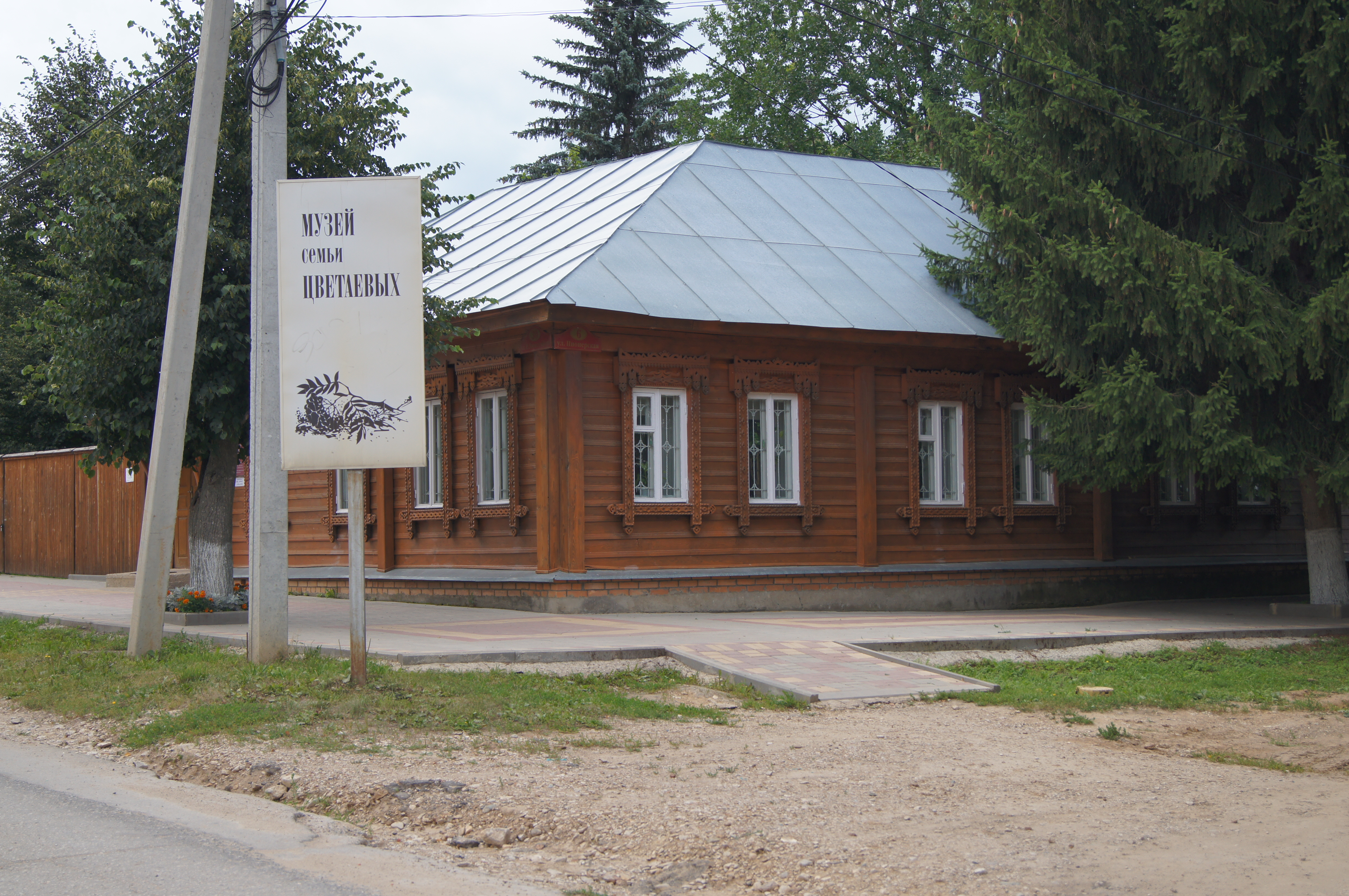
Tsvetayevs Family Museum in Tarusa

The town has a number of popular museums—the Tarusa Regional Museum of Local Lore and the Tsvetayevs Family Museum. It is also home to the Tarusa Town Picture Gallery, which is a branch of Kaluga Regional Museum of Art, boasting a rich collection of such Russian artists as Boris Kustodiev, Nikolay Krymov, Ivan Aivazovsky, Lev Lagorio, and Vasily Polenov.

The Open Russian Festival of Animated Film was held in Tarusa until 2002, after which it was moved to Suzdal.

== Economy ==
Tarusa has an Art Ceramics factory, a design studio of the Space Research Institute of the Russian Academy of Sciences, manufacturing, and a milk factory.

== Cemeteries ==
Tarusa has two cemeteries: the Old Cemetery and the New Cemetery. Writer Konstantin Paustovsky, sculptor Vasily Vatagin, Marina Tsvetaeva's daughter Ariadna Èfron, builder Sergey Krutilin, and writer Nadezhda Krandievskaya are buried in the Old Cemetery.

== See also ==
- Bibliography of Russian history
