= Odoyevsky =

Odoyevsky (masculine), Odoyevskaya (feminine), or Odoyevksoye (neuter) may refer to:

- Vladimir Odoyevsky (1803–1869), Russian philosopher and writer
- Odoyevsky District, a district of Tula Oblast, Russia
- Odoyevsky (rural locality), a rural locality (a settlement) in Tula Oblast, Russia
- Odoyevskoye, a rural locality (a selo) in Kostroma Oblast, Russia
- Odoyevsky family, an extinct Russian Rurikid princely family.
