= Principality of Tarusa =

Russian principality (1246–1392)

Principality of Tarusa Тарусское княжество (Russian)
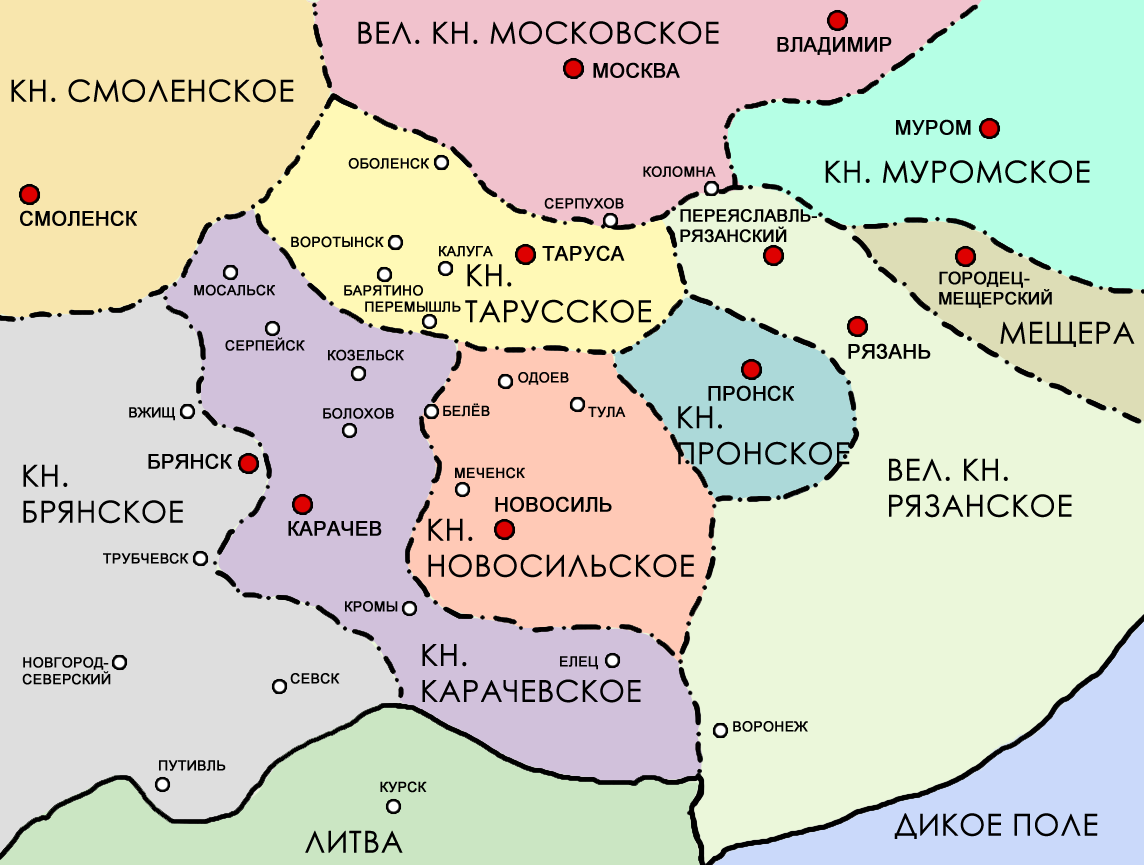
Early Upper Oka Principalities c. 1300
Principality of Tarusa
Principality of Novosil'
Principality of Karachev
- Status: Principality
- Capital: Tarusa
- Common languages: Russian
- Religion: Russian Orthodoxy
- Government: Monarchy
- Prince
  - 13th century: Yury Mikhailovich (first)
- Today part of: Russia

The Principality of Tarusa (Note: Also spelled Tarussa or Torusa.) (Russian: Тарусское княжество, romanized: Tarusskoye knyazhestvo) was a minor Russian principality in the 13th to 15th centuries. It was one of the Upper Oka Principalities, with its center at Tarusa. It fragmented into several appanage principalities, which were later incorporated into the Grand Principality of Moscow.

== History ==
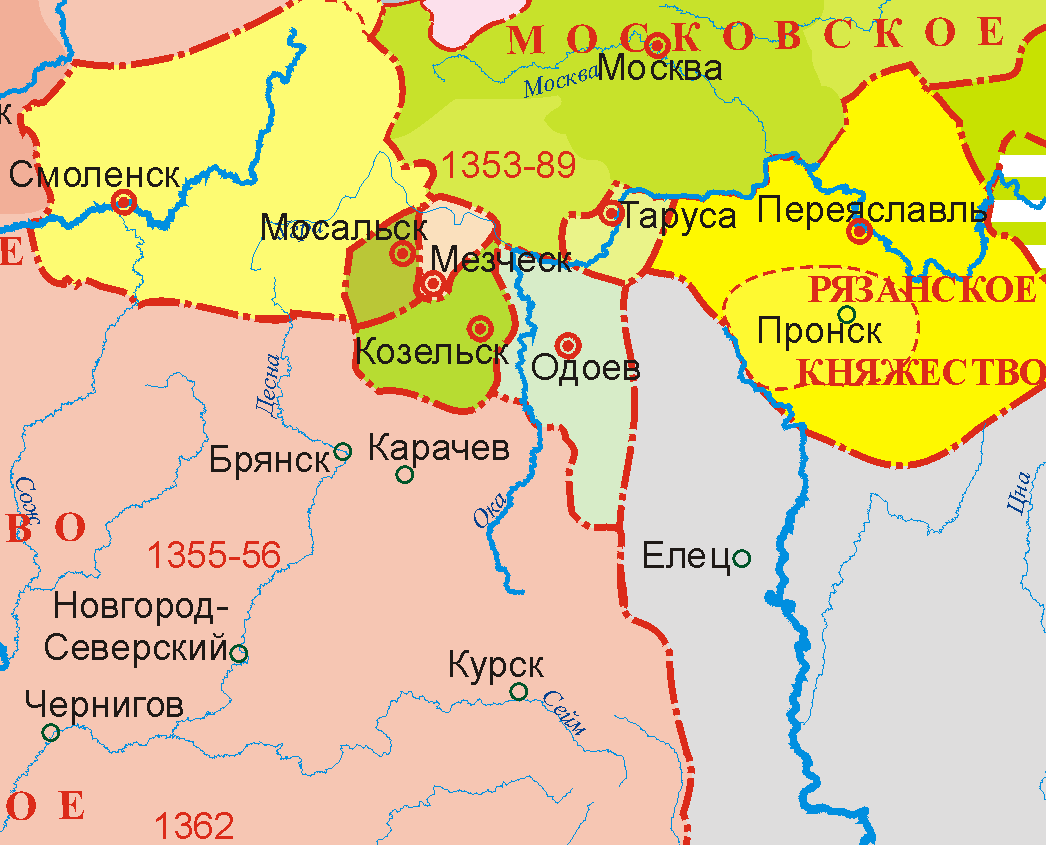
Upper Oka Principalities in 1389. Principality of Odoyev Principality of Tarusa Principality of Kozelsk Principality of Masalsk

The first prince of Tarusa is considered to be Yury Mikhailovich, the youngest son of Mikhail Vsevolodovich of Chernigov, who received Tarusa upon his father's death in 1246. According to genealogies from the early 16th century, Yury came to Tarusa and had five sons, with the eldest, Vsevolod, being given Tarusa. Subsequently, the principality was divided into several appanage principalities, including Obolensk.

By the 1350s, the Upper Oka Principalities were likely dependent on Moscow. In 1392, Tarusa was annexed to Moscow. In a 1402 treaty with Ryazan, the grand prince of Moscow obliged the grand prince of Ryazan to make peace with the prince of Tarusa, who had belonged to Moscow.

By the end of the 14th century and the beginning of the 15th century, the appanages of Tarusa were buffer possessions of the Grand Principality of Moscow and the Grand Duchy of Lithuania. Some princes became Lithuanian subjects, such as the Mezetskys and Volkonskys, while others remained subjects of Moscow and retained appanage rights, such as the Obolenskys and Myshetskys. By the middle of the 15th century, nearly all of the princes were in Muscovite service, and by the end of the 15th century and the start of the 16th century, those princes lost their independence.

According to one of the genealogies, Andrey (Fyodor) Myshetsky in 1409 went into the service of the grand prince of Moscow, Vasily I, and in 1488, his descendant Ivan Myshetsky was sent to Novgorod by Ivan III and his inheritance (votchina) went to Ivan. N. P. Likhachev noted that the chronicle source confirms the resettlement of people in Muscovite service to Novgorod in the years 1488–1489. In 1503, Ivan III bequeathed his oldest surviving son, Vasily, the grand principality along with the towns bordering Ryazan, including Tarusa, Gorodets, and others.

== See also ==
- Family tree of Russian monarchs

== Bibliography ==
- Shekov, Aleksandr Vladimirovich (2012). Верховские княжества. Середина XIII - середина XVI в. (in Russian). Русская панорама. ISBN 978-5-91791-016-1.
