= Odoyevsky family =

Russian princely family

Princely House of Odoyev Князья Одоевские Odoyevsky
- royal/princely family
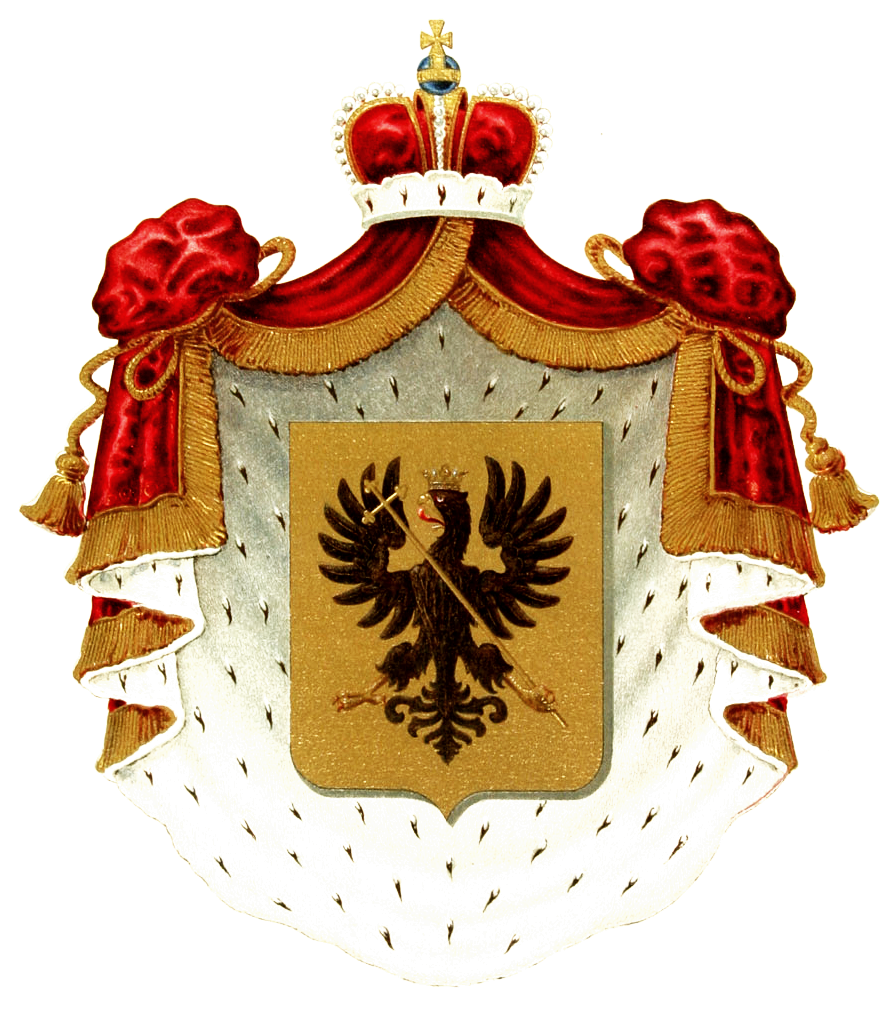
- The coat of arms features the heraldic emblem of Chernigov (thus highlighting descent from St. Mikhail of Chernigov)
- Parent family: House of Chernigov, Rurik dynasty
- Place of origin: Chernigov, Kievan Rus
- Founded: 1376
- Founder: Prince Roman Semyonovich of Novosil Prince Yuri Romanovich Odoyevsky the Black
- Estate(s): Bolshevo in Korolyov, Moscow Oblast
- Dissolution: 1869
- Deposition: 1494

The House of Odoyev (Russian: Одо́евские, Polish: Odojewscy) was a branch of the Olgovichi princely family descended from Michael of Chernigov via the sovereign princes of Odoyev and Novosil. Their ancestors were the Upper Oka sovereigns who ruled the tiny Principality of Odoyev until 1494. In the following decade the family was absorbed into the ranks of Muscovite boyars. The Odoyevsky family died out in the mid-19th century. The family was listed in the 5th part ('titled nobility') of the dvoryanstvo registers of the Moscow and Vladimir regions.

== History ==
The princely House of Odoyev dates from 1376, when Prince Roman Semyonovich of Novosil moved his seat from Novosil (in the present-day Oryol Oblast) to Odoyev (in the present-day Tula Oblast) after Mamai's Tatars destroyed the town of Novosil in 1375. According to the Velvet Book, the family traced their lineage from Prince Michael of Chernigov (c. 1185 – 1246), Grand Duke of Kiev and Chernigov, a saint of the Russian Orthodox Church.

Up until the late 1400s, the House of Novosil and Odoyev played off Moscow against the Grand Duchy of Lithuania and the Golden Horde. Through the 15th century, the House of Odoyev concluded many treaties with Lithuania under the condition of internal autonomy and independence in their politics towards Moscow and Ryazan.

The first appanage prince of Odoyev was Yuriy Romanovich Odoyevsky, nicknamed "the Black" (d. 1427). In 1494 he submitted to Duke Ivan III of Moscow and the Princes of Odoyev became vassal "serving princes" (sluzhilye kniazya) at the Moscow court. In the late 1500s, the Odoyevsky princes finally lost their principality to Ivan the Terrible (r. 1533–1584) and entered the regular boyar aristocracy.

In the 16th and 17th centuries the Odoyevsky family served at the Moscow court as boyars and voivodes. The house produced 13 boyars. The voivodes from the Odoyevsky family participated in many battles of the 16th century, and were especially notable in the battles with the Tatars and in the 1552 Kazanian Campaign of Ivan the Terrible. Prince Nikita Romanovich Odoevsky (d. 1573) entered the Oprichnina of 1565–1572. As a boyar and a member of the Oprichnina, he served as a leader in many battles. He was the voivode at the Battle of Molodi (1572), fighting against the Crimean Khan Devlet I Giray. He headed the troops in the 1572 battle with the Cherimisy after their uprising in the Second Cheremis War. In 1573, soon after he was appointed the voivode on the Oka, he suddenly fell from grace, was captured and tortured to death. His grandson, Prince Nikita Ivanovich Odoyevsky (c. 1605 – 1689), served as namestnik (Russian: наместник - viceroy) in Astrakhan and in Vladimir, ran the Prikaz (ministry) of Siberia and the Prikaz of the Kazanian palace. He supervised the making of the Code of 1649 (Sobornoye Ulozheniye), was the head of the Grand Treasury and the Ministries of the Reiter (ru:Рейтарский приказ) and Foreign Regiments. In 1682 he signed the decree annulling the mestnichestvo.

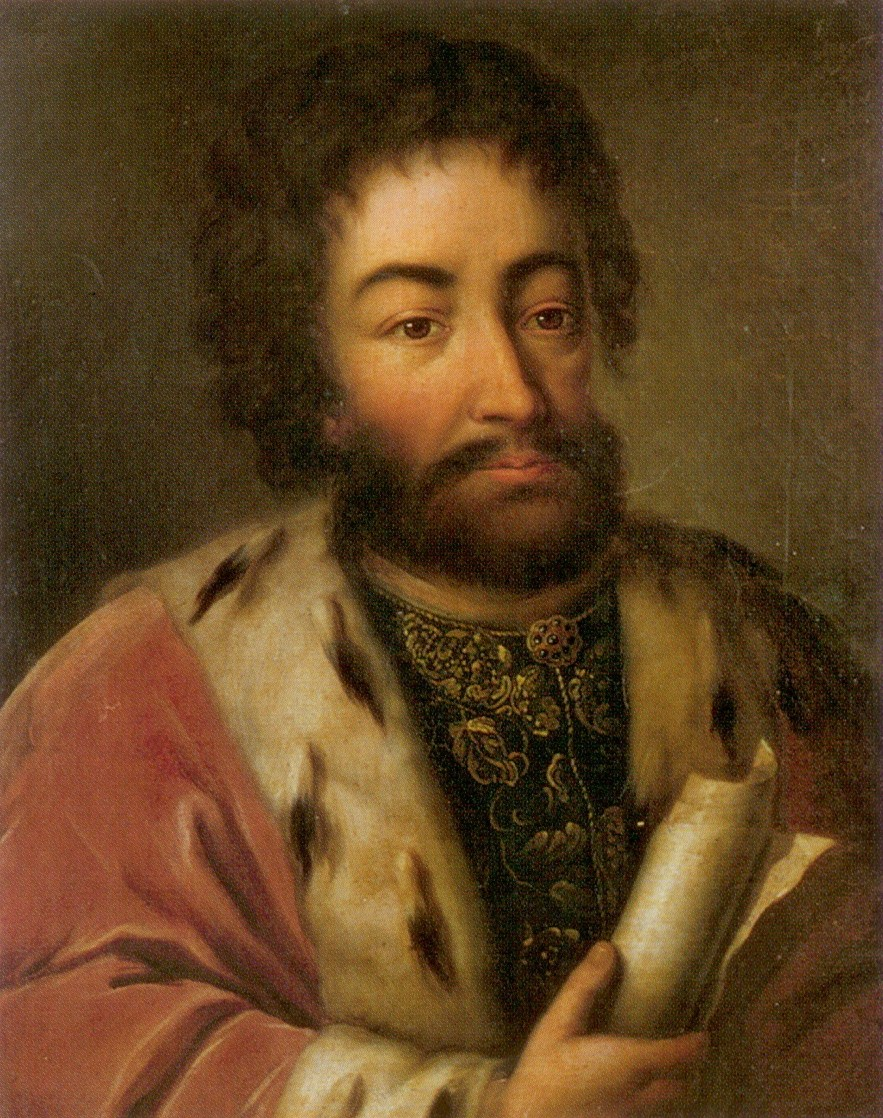
Prince and boyar Nikita Ivanovich Odoyevsky

In the 18th and 19th centuries the Odoyevsky family formed part of the highest aristocracy. However, despite their illustrious background, the members of the family occupied relatively mediocre ranks and offices, becoming (for example) as colonels, ministerial officials and junior generals, while many family members held regular junior officers' ranks. Prince Alexander Ivanovich Odoyevsky (1802–1839), a cornet in the Imperial guards, was a member of the Decembrists' Northern Society and took part in the revolt of 1825. He was sentenced to katorga, but in 1837 he was transferred to the Caucasus with the rank of private. The last member of the Odoyevsky family, Vladimir Fyodorovich Odoyevsky (1803–1869) was a writer, philosopher and a musical critic; he served as an employee at a series of institutions; from 1846 he was the assistant to the head of the Russian Imperial Public Library and the curator of the Rumyantsev Museum. In 1861 he was appointed a Senator. He died childless.

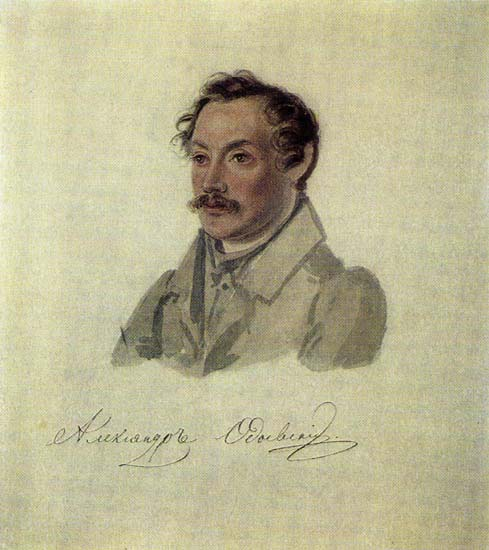
Decembrist Alexander Odoyevsky, 1833.

In 1878 the Emperor Alexander II allowed staff-rotmister of the Imperial guards, Nikolay Maslov (1849–1919), the son of Sofia Ivanovna Odoyevskaya, to name himself Odoyevsky-Maslov, and to merge his own coat-of-arms with that of his mother's family to pass it down to his senior male descendants. Later Nikolay Odoyevsky-Maslov became a General of the Cavalry (1914) and the appointed ataman (1905–1907) of the Don Cossack troops; however, he also died childless.

== Notable members ==
- Prince Roman Semyonovich of Novosil and Odoyev (d. 1402) was the founder of the sovereign Duchy of Odoyev.
- Prince Vasily Romanovich of Novosil and Odoyev (d. before 1450) was the founder of the royal House of Belyov.
- Prince Lev Romanovich of Novosil and Odoyev (d. before 1450) was the founder of the royal House of Vorotynsk.
- Prince Yury Romanovich the Black Odoyevsky (d. 1427) was the first actual appanage prince of Odoyev, vassal to Muscovy..
- Prince Ivan Semyonovich Sukhoruk Odoyevsky (d. 1508) was the first prince of Odoyev who submitted to the Duchy of Moscow. Since that time the family lost their sovereignty.
- Prince Nikita Romanovich Odoyevsky (d. 1573) was a boyar and a member of Oprichnina, participated in many battles as a voivode. He was executed by Ivan the Terrible in 1573.
- Prince Ivan Nikitich Odoevsky Mnikha, the Elder (d. 1616) was a prominent figure in the Time of Trouble. In 1598 he was one of the electors of Boris Godunov on the throne. In 1606 he was given the rank of boyar by False Dmitry I. Then he alleged to Vasily Shuysky, but when the latter was dethroned, he submitted to Prince Wladislaw IV Vasa. He was the voivode in Novgorod when the throne was occupied by Michael Romanov. He promised to submit to King Gustavus Adolphus of Sweden, but died before Novgorod was returned to Moscow.
- Prince Ivan Nikitich Odoyevsky, the Younger (d. 1629) was a boyar and voivode, took part in electing Michael Romanov on the throne.

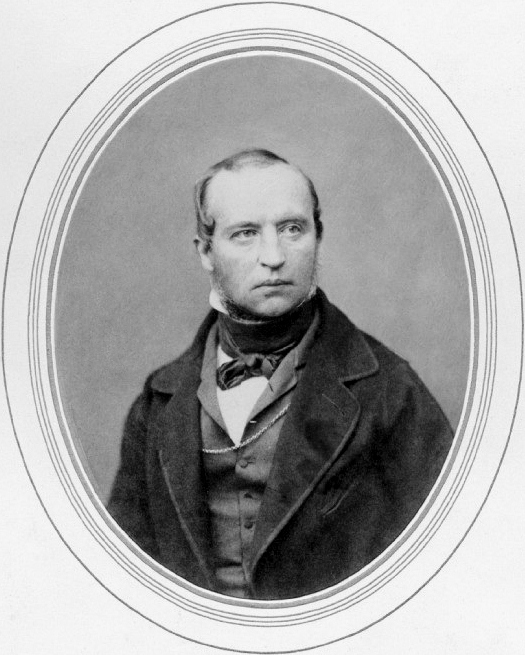
Writer Vladimir Odoyevsky, the last male descendant of the family

- Prince Ivan Vasilyevich Odoyevsky (1710–1768) was the president of the Votchina College (1741–1744).
- Prince Ivan Sergeevich Odoyevsky (1769–1839) was a Russian major general, the chief of the Ingermanland Dragoon regiment.
- Prince Alexander Ivanovich Odoyevsky (1803–1839) was a poet, a member of the Decembrist circle, a participant in the Revolt of 1825.
- Prince Vladimir Fyodorovich Odoyevsky (1803–1869) was the last direct male descendant of the princely House of Odoyev, a writer, philosopher and critic. He died childless and the House of Odoyevsky got extinct.
- Nikolay Nikolayevich Odoyevsky-Maslov (1849–1919) was a Russian general of Cavalry, an Adujutant general, the interim ataman of the Cossack troops. He was the maternal descendant of the Odoyevsky family, but also died childless.
