= Peremyshlsky =

Peremyshlsky (masculine), Peremyshlskaya (feminine), or Peremyshlskoye (neuter) may refer to:

- Peremyshlsky District, a district of Kaluga Oblast, Russia
- Peremyshlsky (family), a princely family of Rurikid stock
