= Ugra National Park =

National park in Russia

- IUCN category II (national park)
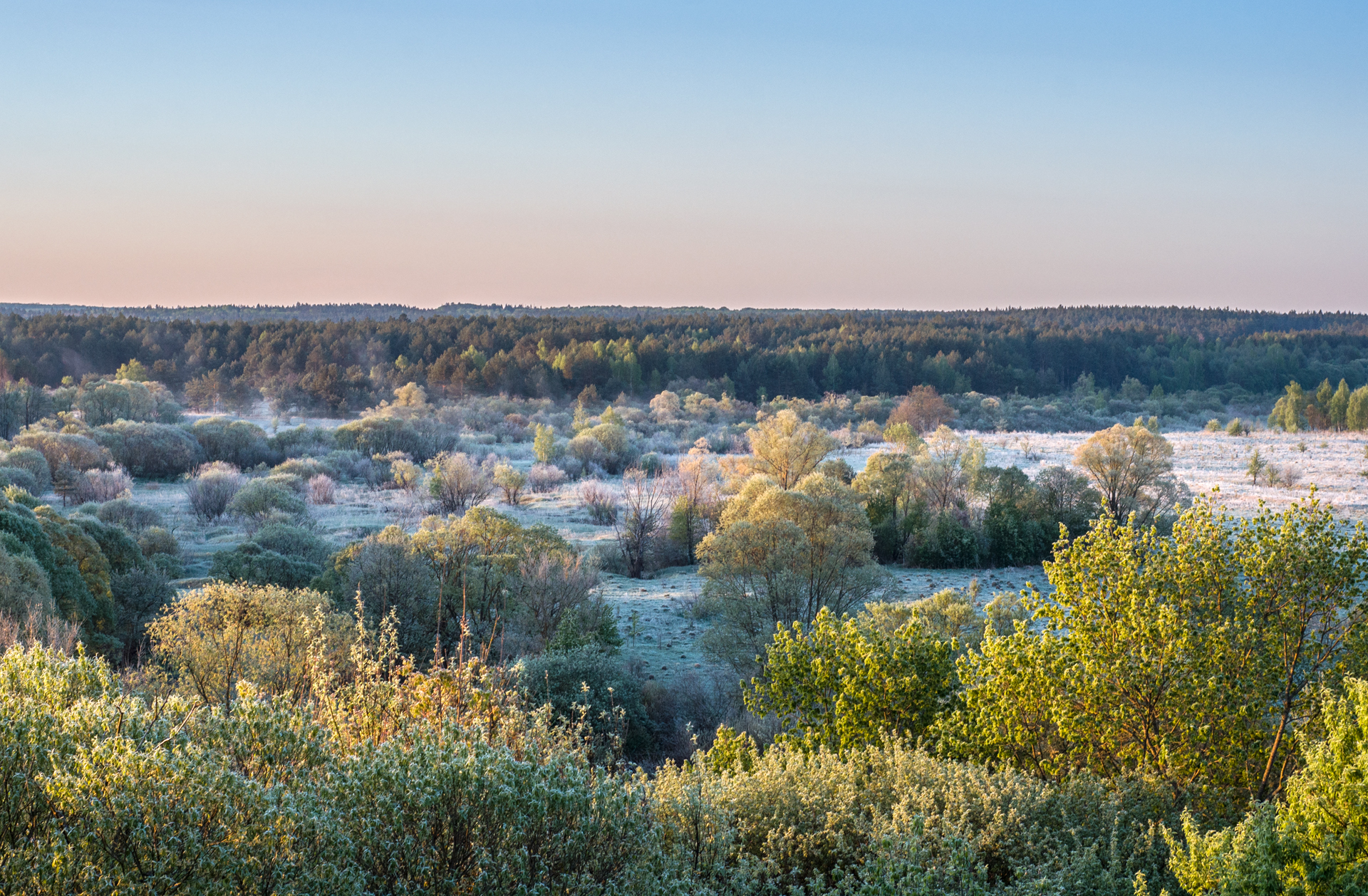
- Light frost on a May dawn

- Location within Russia
- Location: Russia
- Nearest city: Kaluga
- Coordinates: 54°13′46″N 36°11′12″E
- Area: 986,245 square kilometres (380,791 mi^{2})
- Established: 1997

Ugra National Park (Russian: Национальный парк Угра) is a national park in central Russia, located in Kaluga Oblast, in the valley of the Ugra River. It was established on 10 February 1997 to protect typical landscapes of Central Russia. In 2002, it was designated a UNESCO biosphere reserve. The headquarters of the national park are located in Kaluga.

== Geography ==
The total area of the park is 986,245 square kilometres (380,791 mi^{2}). It consists of seven clusters grouped into three areas,

- The northern part comprises the valley of the Ugra from the border with Smolensk Oblast downstream to the village of Kurovskoye. This part is split between Dzerzhinsky, Iznoskovsky, and Yukhnovsky Districts;
- The southern part includes the valley of the Zhizdra River down to its mouth; it belongs to Kozelsky and Peremyshlsky Districts;
- The Vorotynsk part, the smallest of the three, surrounds the selo of Vorotynsk and is split between Babyninsky and Peremyshlsky Districts.

Mammals in the park include moose, wild boar, roe deer, Eurasian beaver, and muskrat. Russian desman is an endangered species which lives in lakes within the park.

== Tourism ==
The rivers in the park are popular for kayaking.

The park is located in a historical area with significant number of cultural attractions which include Optina Monastery, the former medieval town of Vorotynsk and the location of the Great stand on the Ugra river which took place in 1480 between the armies of the Grand Duchy of Moscow and the Golden Horde.

Nikola-Lenivets (ru), Europe's largest art park, occupies a parcel of the national park.
