= Ugra (Oka) =

River in Smolensk and Kaluga Oblasts, Russia

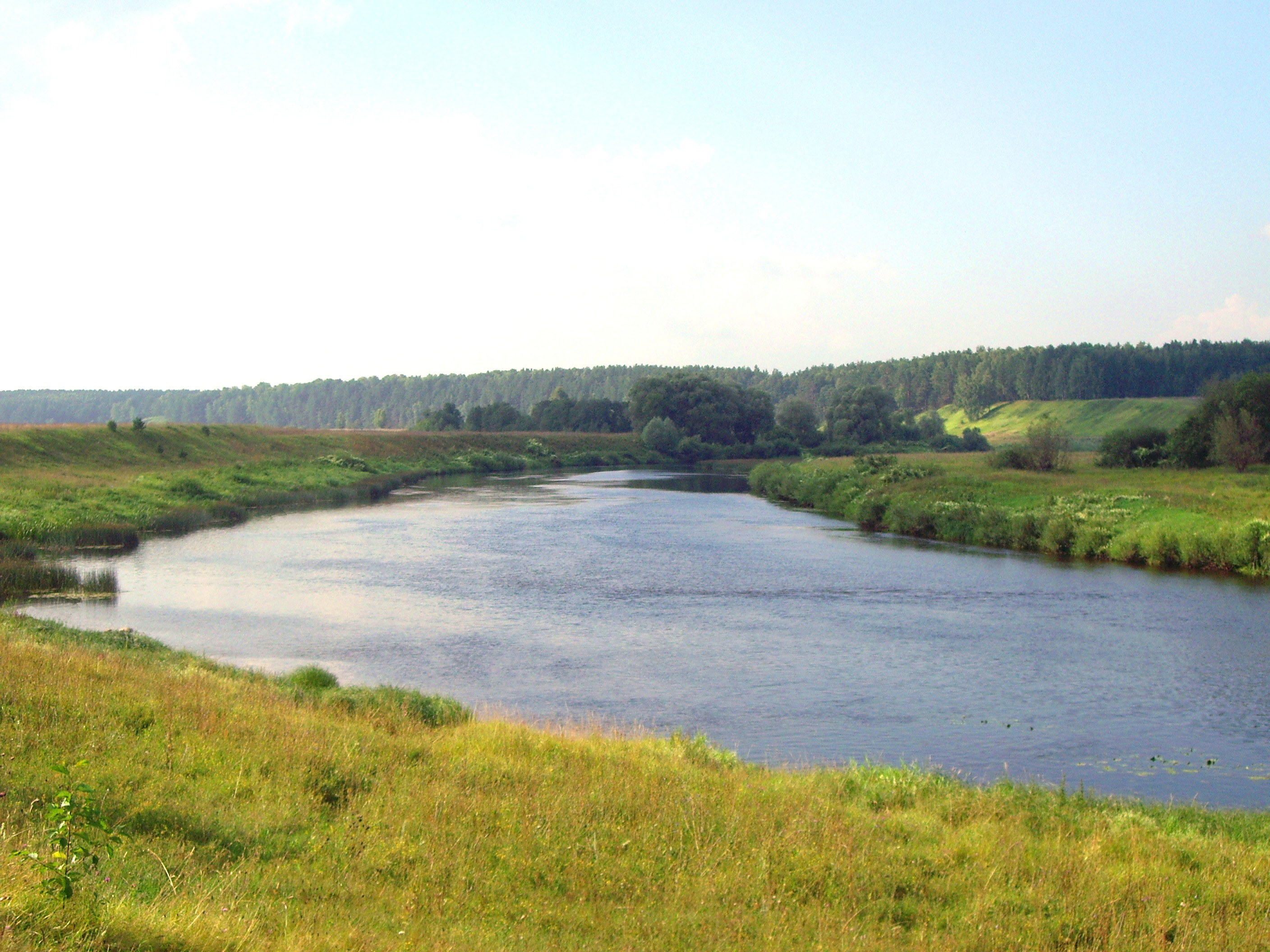

- Location within Russia
- Native name: Угра (Russian)

Location
- Country: Russia

Physical characteristics
- Mouth: Oka
  - coordinates: 54.5072°N 36.1064°E
- Length: 399 km (248 mi)
- Basin size: 15,700 km^{2} (6,100 sq mi)

Basin features
- Progression: Oka→ Volga→ Caspian Sea

The Ugra (Russian: Угра́) is a river in Smolensk and Kaluga Oblasts in Russia, left tributary of the Oka. The east-flowing Ugra joins the north-flowing Oka at Kaluga and the united river, called the Oka, continues east to the Volga. In the 16th century, the Ugra-Oka confluence was the western end of a line of forts protecting Muscovy from Tatar raids. The river is known for the Great stand on the Ugra River. Its length is 399 kilometres (248 mi) and its basin 15,700 square kilometres (6,100 sq mi). It is frozen from late November (sometimes as late as January) until the end of March. 60% of its annual flow is snowmelt, mostly in April.

A part of the valley of the Ugra located in Kaluga Oblast belongs to Ugra National Park.
