= Peremyshl, Russia =

Peremyshl Перемы́шль
- Rural locality
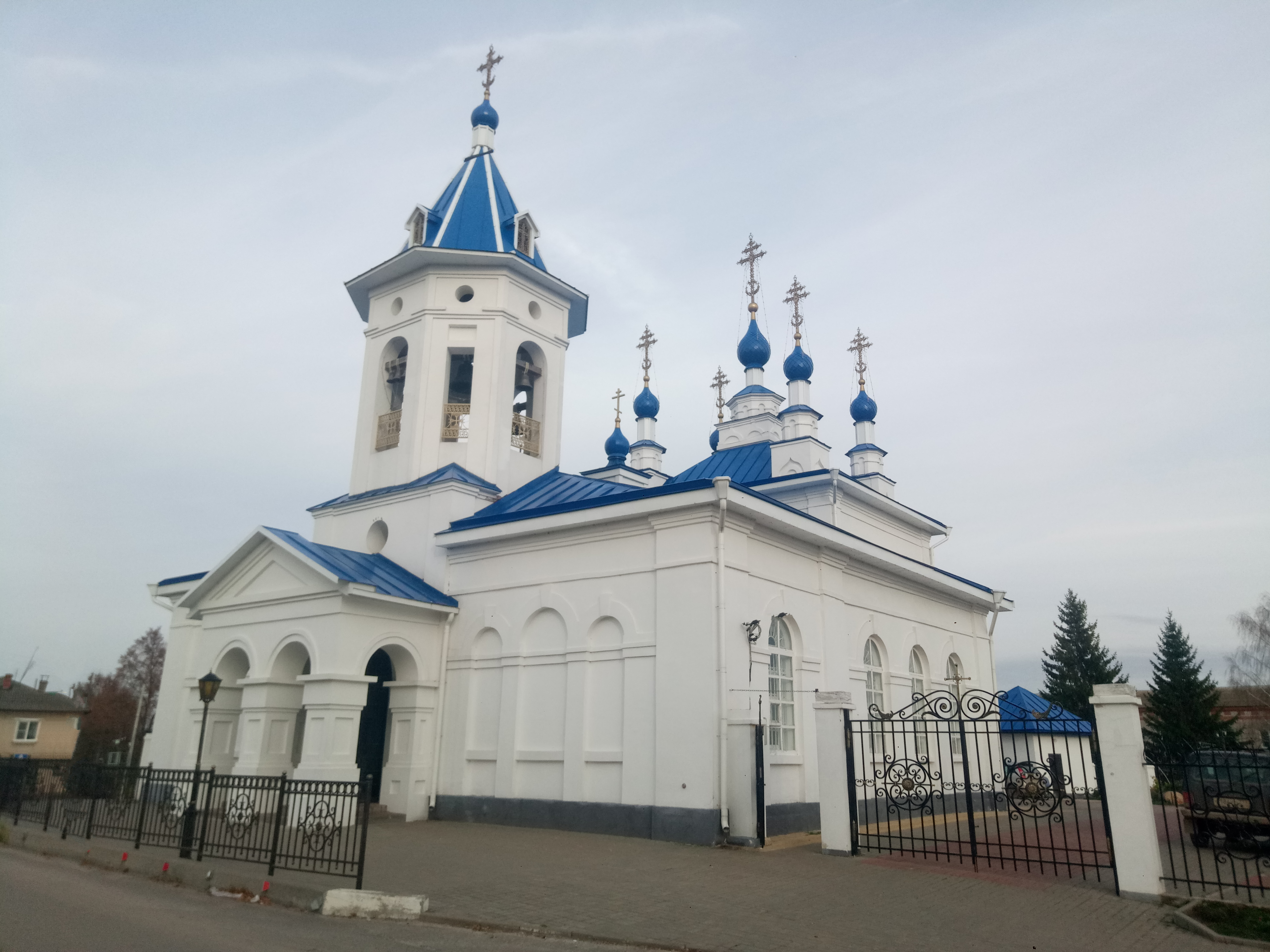
- Temple in honor of the Nativity of the Blessed Virgin Mary

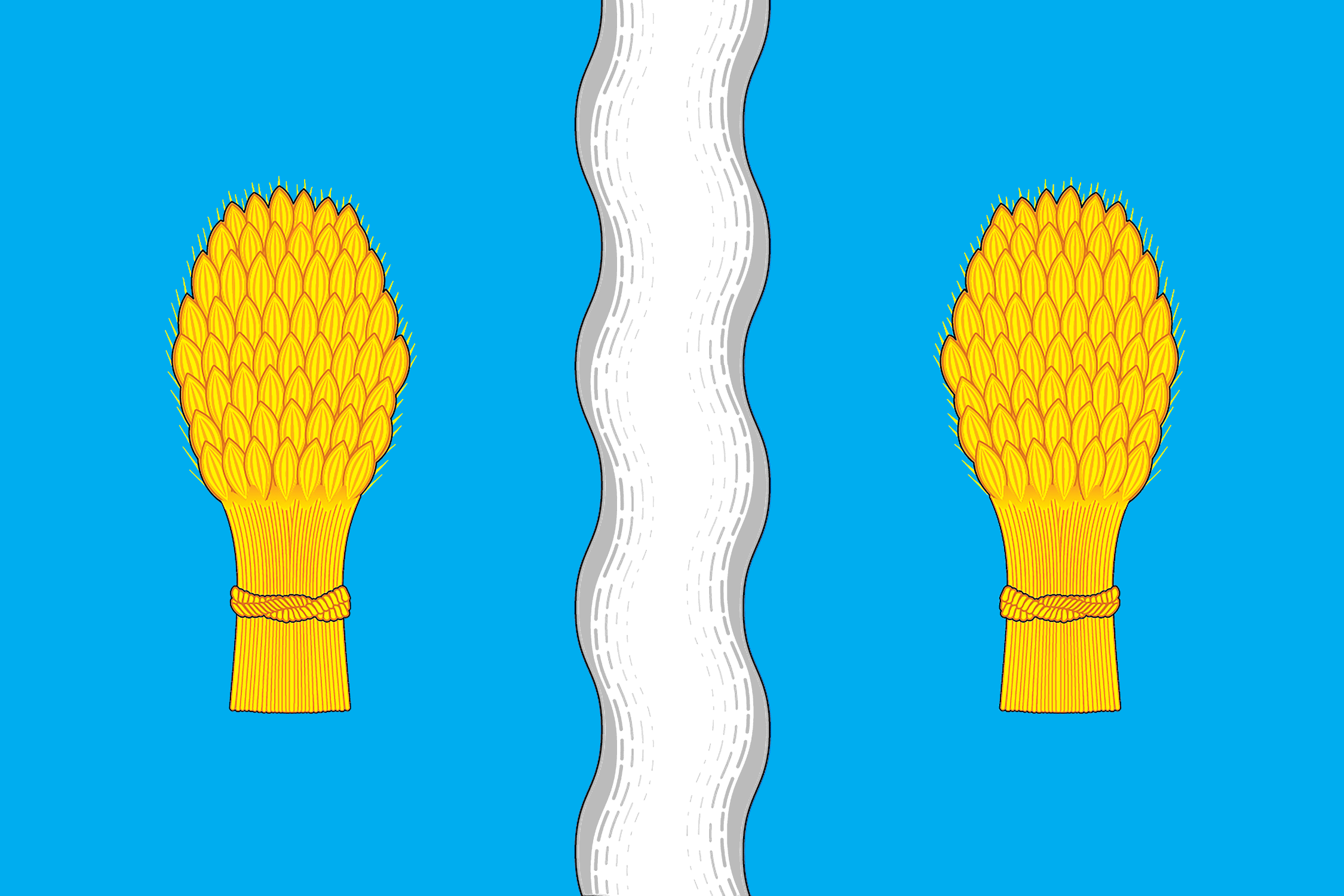
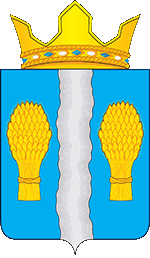
- Flag Coat of arms
- Interactive map of Peremyshl
- Location of Peremyshl Peremyshl (Russia)
- Coordinates: 54°16′N 36°10′E
- Country: Russia
- Federal subject: Kaluga Oblast
- First mentioned: 1328

Population
  - Estimate (2021): 3,603 )
- Time zone: UTC+3 (MSK)
- Postal code: 249130
- OKTMO ID: 29632401101

Peremyshl (Russian: Перемы́шль) is a rural locality (a selo) and the administrative center of Peremyshlsky District of Kaluga Oblast, Russia. It has a population of 3,603 (2021 census); 3,279 (2010 census); 3,235 (2002 census); 3,168 (1989 Soviet census)..

== History ==
The town was mentioned in 1328, and was a capital of one of the Upper Oka Principalities. In the late 14th century it passed to the Grand Duchy of Lithuania, and in 1407 it passed to the Grand Duchy of Moscow. It was a fortified town in the 16th century, yet, it was sacked several times.

Formerly a capital of one of the Upper Oka Principalities, Peremyshl contains the ruins of a mid-16th century cathedral which collapsed in the 1980s from neglect. Descendants of the local rulers include the Vorotynsky and Gorchakov families.
