= Diocese of Bryansk =

Diocese of Bryansk Брянская епархия
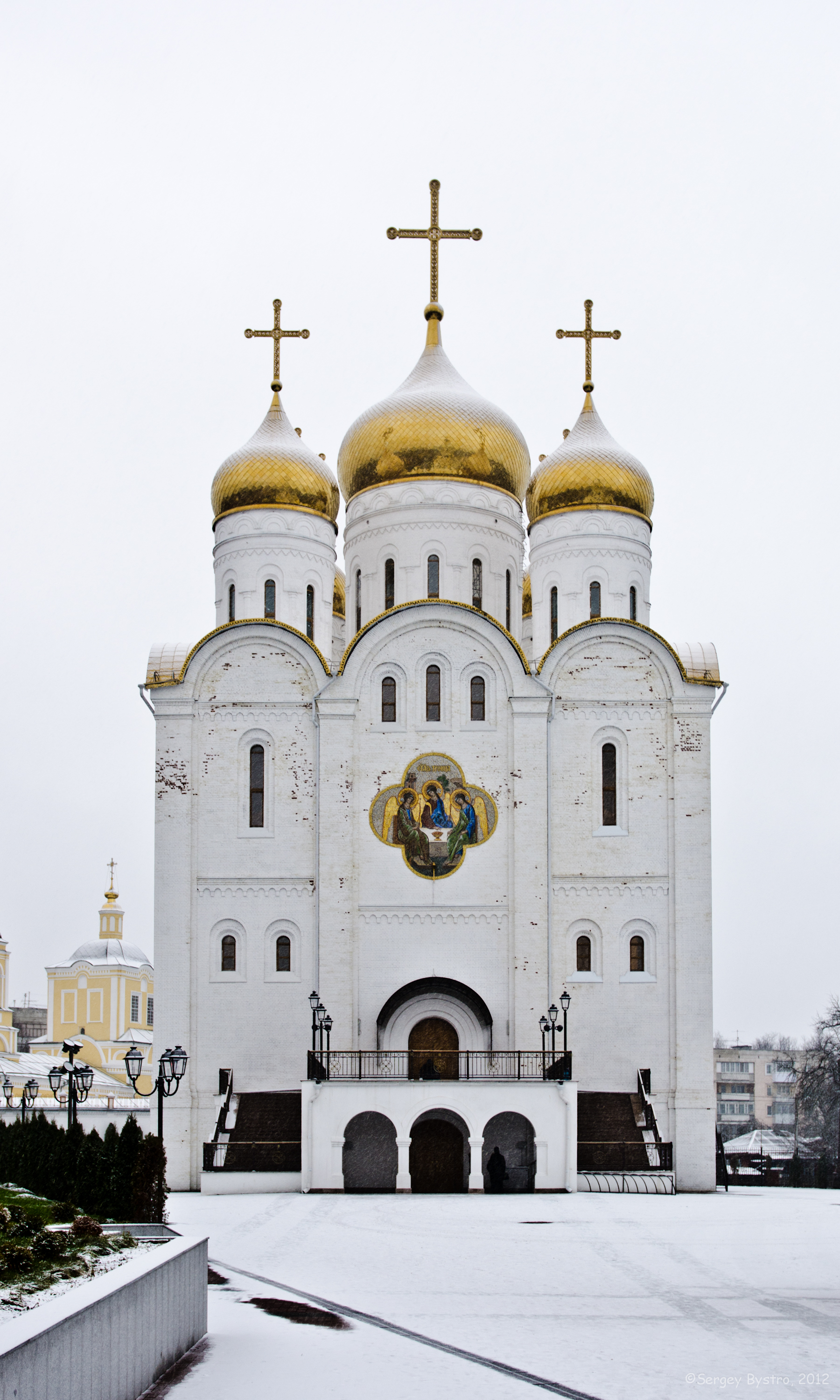
- Trinity Cathedral in Bryansk

Location
- Territory: 34,857 sqm
- Deaneries: 12
- Headquarters: Bryansk

Information
- Denomination: Eastern Orthodox
- Sui iuris church: Russian Orthodox Church
- Established: 1246; 22 December 1920; 26 February 1994
- Cathedral: Trinity Cathedral
- Language: Church Slavonic

Current leadership
- Governance: Eparchy
- Bishop: Aleksandr Agrikov since 28 December 2011

Website
- www.bryansk-eparhia.ru

Diocese of Bryansk (Russian: Брянская епархия) is a diocese (Eparchy) of the Russian Orthodox Church, uniting parishes and monasteries in the eastern part of the Bryansk Oblast (within the boundaries of the city of Bryansk, as well as Brasovsky, Bryansky, Vygonichsky, Dubrovsky, Dyatkovsky, Zhiryatinsky, Zhukovsky, Karachevsky, Komarichsky, Navlinsky, Rognedinsky, Sevsky, Suzemsky districts). It is part of the Metropolinate of Bryansk.

The ruling bishop is Alexander (Agrikov), metropolitan of Bryansk and Sevsk.

== History ==
The episcopal see in Bryansk existed from the middle of the 13th century, when Prince Roman Mikhailovich the Old, following the transfer of the capital of his principality from Chernigov to Bryansk, managed to achieve the transfer of the Chernigov see to his new capital. The Bryansk diocese continued to exist after the Bryansk Principality became part of the Grand Duchy of Lithuania (1356).

For a short period of time, the see of the Metropolitan of Kyiv and All Rus' was located in Bryansk, transferred here from the devastated Kyiv at the end of the 13th century by Metropolitan Maxim. Later Maxim moved the department to Suzdal, and in 1299 to Vladimir.

In 1500, a significant part of the former Diocese of Bryansk, including the cities of Chernigov, Bryansk, Starodub and Novgorod-Seversky, was annexed to the Tsardom of Russia and came under the jurisdiction of the Metropolis of Moscow. These lands were assigned to the Diocese of Smolensk, whose bishops from that time were called Smolensk and Bryansk.

By decree of Tsar Mikhail Fedorovich dated May 20, 1625, the cities of Bryansk, Sevsk and Karachev entered the Patriarchal Region, which is the reason for the title Bryansk not been mentioned in the names of departments since then.

At the Council in November 1681, Tsar Fyodor Alekseevich proposed to establish two episcopal sees under the authority of the Smolensk Metropolitan - in Bryansk and in Vyazma. The participants of the Council of 1681-1682 refused to establish subordinate episcopal sees, so that "there would be no ecclesiastical disagreement in the rank of bishops".

From 1764 to 1788, the territory of the Diocese of Bryansk was part of the semi-independent Vicariate of Sevsk of the Diocese of Moscow.

With the establishment of the Diocese of Oryol on May 6, 1788, the lands of the current Diocese of Bryansk became part of it.

On April 1, 1918, Bishop Seraphim (Ostroumov) of Oryol and Sevsk, in his report to the Most Holy Synod, asked to organize a suffragan see of Bryansk and proposed to make Archimandrite Hilarion (Troitsky) the vicar bishop of his diocese with the title “Bryansk and Mtsensk”, but these plans did not come true.

On December 22, 1920, after the creation of the Bryansk province on April 1, 1920, the Diocese of Bryansk was founded. At the time of its formation, there were more than 300 churches operating on the territory of the diocese.

During the German occupation, the territory of the Bryansk Oblast was included in the Smolensk-Bryansk Diocese of the Belarusian Orthodox Church.

In 1946, its territory was included in Oryol. The bishop's title was Bishop of Oryol and Bryansk.

The Bryansk diocese was revived by the decision of the Holy Synod on February 26, 1994, by separating from the Diocese of Oryol. By the time of the resumption of the diocese in the Bryansk Oblast. There were 84 parishes, 3 monasteries (2 male and female), the number of clergy in the diocese was 105 clergy.

By the decision of the Holy Synod of May 29, 2013, Diocese of Klintsy was separated from the Diocese of Bryansk with the inclusion of both dioceses in the newly formed Metropolinate of Bryansk.

== Bishops ==
- Ambrose (Smirnov) (December 22, 1920 - May 25, 1924)
- Agapetus (Borzakovsky) (November 15, 1923 - December 21, 1929) until May 25, 1924 - locum tenens, bishop of Karachevsky
- Matthias (Khramtsev) (1930 - April 7, 1931)
- Daniel (Troitsky) (May 12, 1931 - March 30, 1934)
- Joasaph (Shishkovsky-Drylevsky) (April 5, 1934 - December 15, 1935)
- Juvenal (Mashkovsky) (March 6 - July 30, 1936)
- John (Sokolov) (July 30, 1936 - 1937) locum tenens, Bishop of Yegoryevsk, then - Volokolamsk
- 1945-1994 - as part of the Oryol Diocese
- Melchizedek (Lebedev) (February 26, 1994 - March 13, 2002)
- Theophylact (Moiseyev) (April 20, 2002 - December 28, 2011)
- Aleksander (Agrikov) (from December 28, 2011)

== Deaneries ==
As of 2022:

- Bryansk city deanery - Archpriest Sergiy Rysin
- Bryansk District Deanery - priest Konstantin Serenkov
- Brasov Deanery - Priest Arkady Kunegin
- Vygonichsky Deanery - priest John Travinichev
- Dyatkovo Deanery - Priest Pavel Korneev
- Zhukovsky Deanery - Archpriest Rustik Bogatyrev
- Karachevsky Deanery - Archpriest Vladimir Safronov
- Komarichsky Deanery - and. O. dean priest Igor Ostrovsky
- Navlinsky Deanery - Priest Timofey Uchvatov
- Sevsky Deanery - Priest Konstantin Balin
- Suzema Deanery - Priest Alexy Serebryakov
- Monastic Deanery - abbot Daniel (Tsupikov)
