= Vorotynsky =

Russian noble family

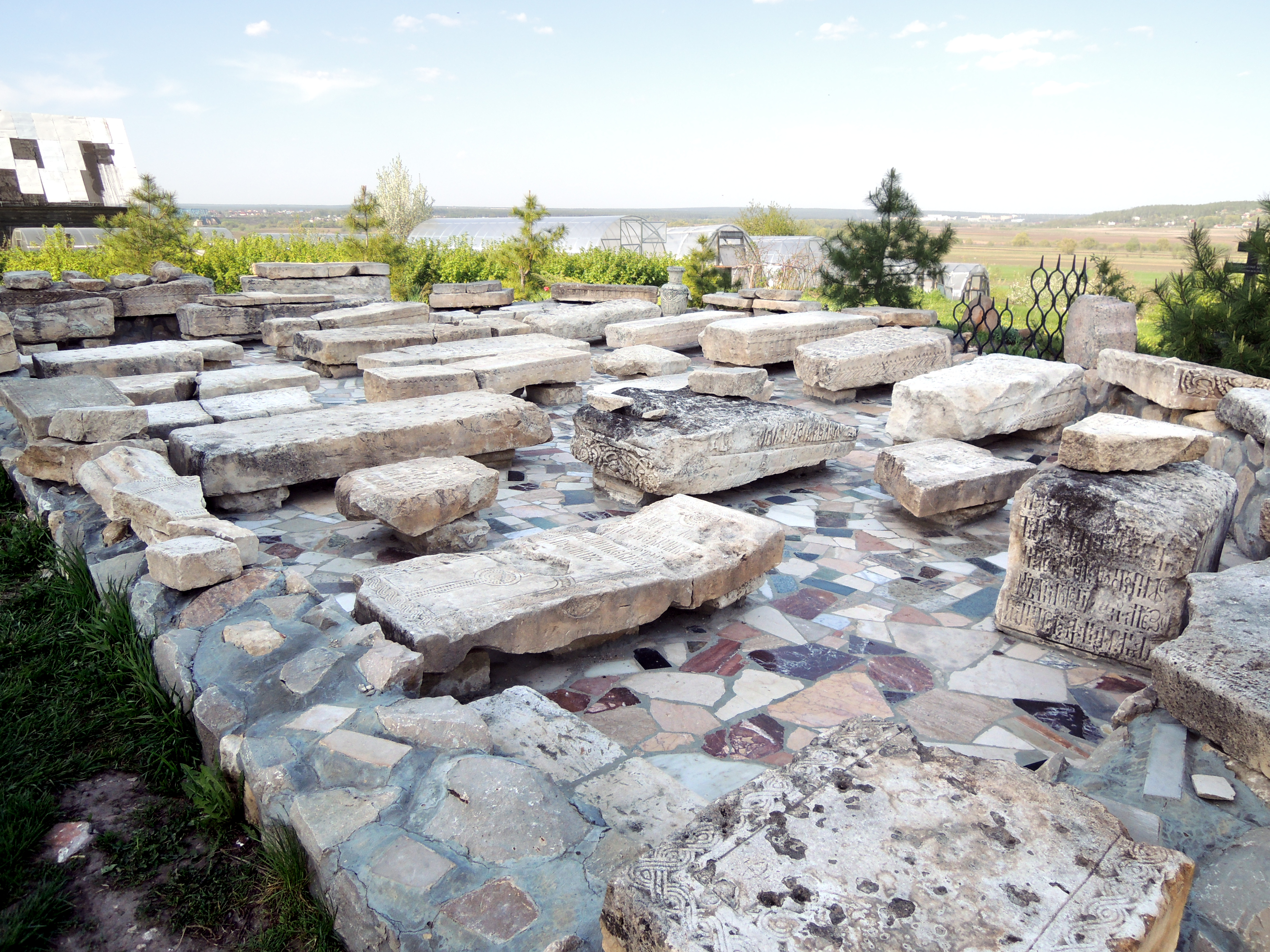
Ancient gravestones in Vorotynsk

The Vorotynsky family was a Russian noble family which was involved in the politics of the Grand Duchy of Moscow and the Tsardom of Russia. Their lands lay principally in the Upper Oka region and comprised the towns of Peremyshl and Vorotynsk as well as parts (дольницы) of Novosil and Odoyev.

== History ==
=== Between Russia and Lithuania ===
Originally lords of Vorotynsk, a tiny Upper Oka principality, these princes entered the service of the Grand Duchy of Lithuania in the mid-15th century, when Prince Fyodor Romanovich was betrothed to Algirdas' granddaughter. Their grandson, Prince Ivan Mikhailovich Vorotynsky, defected to the Grand Duchy of Moscow and helped Vasily III besiege and take Smolensk. He routed the Crimean Tatars in Ukraine in 1508 and again in 1517 near Tula. Aiming at advantage against his young rival Prince Belsky, Ivan did nothing to help him when the Tatars routed Belsky's army four years later. On this event, Vorotynsky fell into disgrace until 1525, when he solemnly promised to forget his enmity against Belsky and to suspend all the contacts with his Lithuanian relatives. The suspicion as to his plans of defecting to Lithuania still lingered, however. It was the reason given by regent Elena Glinskaya when she ordered him to be taken into custody and immured in the distant Kirillo-Belozersky Monastery, where he died on July 21, 1535.

=== The Vorotynskys and Ivan the Terrible ===
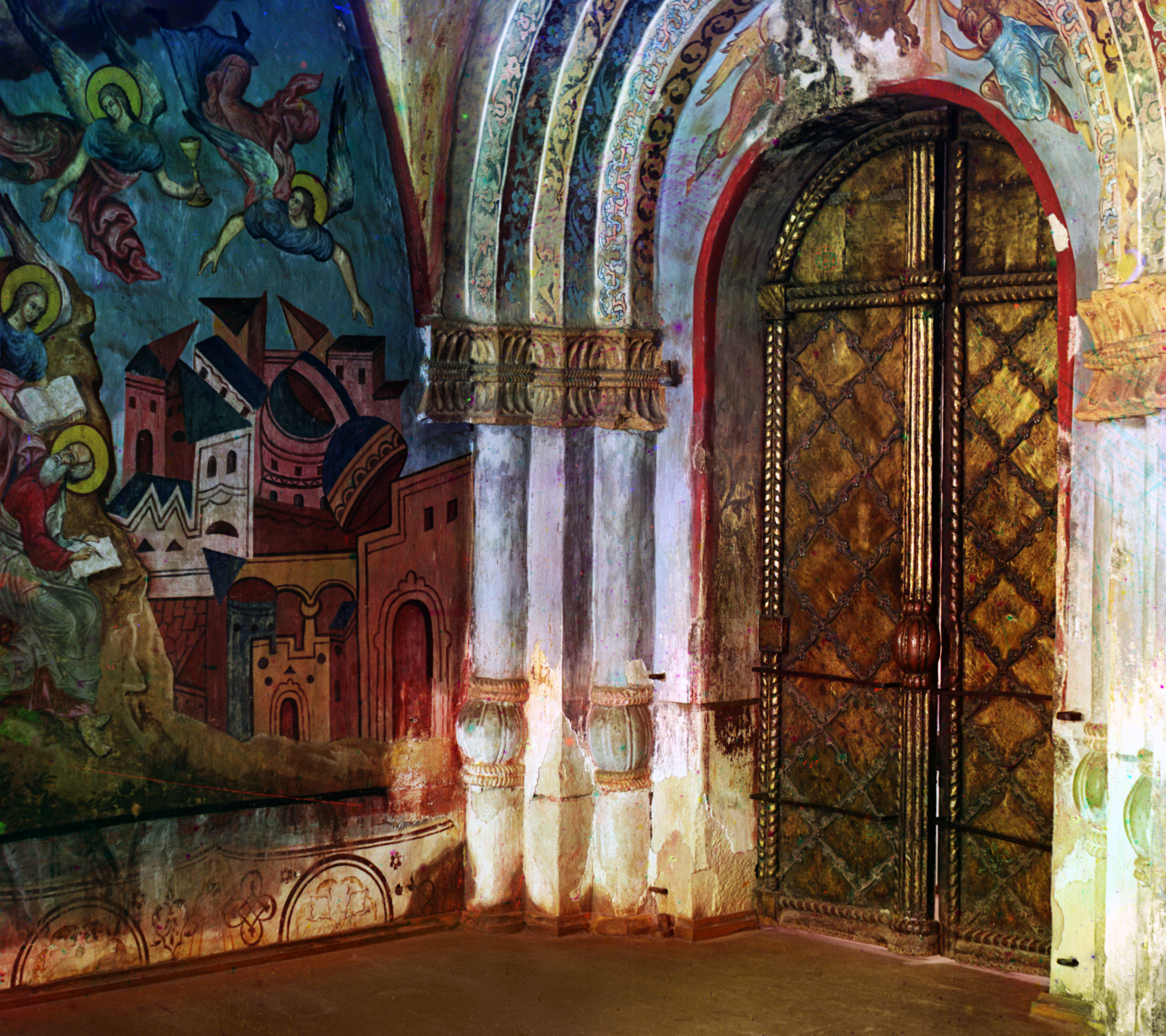
Vorotynsky family chapel and burial vault in the Kirillov Monastery (photo from 1909)

Ivan Mikhailovich had three sons, all of whom played a part in Muscovite politics as boyars and voivodes. The eldest of these, Prince Vladimir Ivanovich Vorotynsky, was solicitous to talk Vladimir of Staritsa into swearing allegiance to Ivan IV's baby son during the tsar's grave illness in 1553 but died himself on September 27 that year. The youngest, Prince Alexander Ivanovich, was recorded in 1558 as governing the stronghold of Kazan but later lost the tsar's favor and died as a monk in the Sretensky Monastery of Moscow on February 6, 1565.

Prince Mikhail Ivanovich Vorotynsky was one of those commanders who led the conquest of Kazan in 1552 and was the first to take the Arsk Tower. In 1561 the prince was exiled to Beloozero, and his estates were confiscated. Four years later, he was let out on bail and dispatched to govern Kazan. For ten years, Mikhail Vorotynsky was in charge of Russian southern borders, founding new forts and strengthening the Great Abatis Belt. His bold leadership made itself felt at the Battle of Molodi, where he routed the larger Tatar army in the three-day battle (1572).

According to memoirs of Ivan's opponent Prince Kurbsky, a year later, one of Vorotynsky's menials, incriminated in theft, insinuated that Vorotynsky was plotting the tsar's death by magic charms. Ivan the Terrible, who never wanted a pretext to execute a boyar, put Vorotynsky to the torture. Mikhail's body was placed between two bonfires, and the tsar personally "raked the burning coals closer to his holy body with an accursed staff". Following the torture, the badly burnt boyar was taken to Kirillo-Belozersky Monastery. He died on the way and was buried in that monastery close to his father.

The official register books (Razriady) briefly report that Vorotynsky was executed along with two other military leaders, without further details.

=== Time of Troubles ===
Mikhail's son, Prince Ivan Mikhailovich Vorotynsky, was eventually released from the monastery and sent to subdue minor risings in the land of Udmurts. Vorotynsk and other confiscated votchinas of his father were compensated by new lands near Murom, Nizhny Novgorod, and Starodub-Ryapolovsky. During Feodor I's reign, he championed the Shuiskys against Boris Godunov, thus provoking the latter's ire. This time he was exiled to "very distant places", then served as a voivod in Kazan before finally returning to Moscow in 1598. He remained a loyal adherent of Vasily Shuisky in all of his undertakings and appears as such on the pages of Pushkin's tragedy Boris Godunov. In 1610, however, Vorotynsky was one of the boyars who demanded and secured Shuisky's deposition and imprisonment. In 1611 he supported Patriarch Germogen against the pro-Polish party, which had them both put in chains. After the Poles were expelled from the Kremlin, Vorotynsky was nominated one of the candidates to the Russian throne. When the Zemsky Sobor named Mikhail Romanov as a new tsar, Vorotynsky led a deputation of boyars to the Ipatiev Monastery to inform Mikhail about his election. Later, he governed Kazan and Moscow during the tsar's absence from the capital. He died as a monk on January 8, 1627.

Thenceforward the Vorotynskys didn't figure prominently in national politics. Ivan's only son, Prince Aleksey Ivanovich (1610–42), died at the age of 32, survived by his wife, a sister of Tsarina Eudoxia Streshneva. Their son Ivan Alekseyevich Vorotynsky probably profited from his being first cousin of Tsar Alexis, as the 1678 census shows him as one of the biggest private landowners in Russia. He died the following year, on July 24, leaving no male heirs. Thereupon his lands fell to a daughter, Anastasia, who married Prince Peter Galitzine. Anastasia died on December 12, 1691, and was buried by the Patriarch in Epiphany Monastery of Moscow.
