= Boryatino =

Boryatino Борятино
- Village
- Location within Bryansk Oblast Location within Russia
- Coordinates: 53°27′N 33°00′E
- Country: Russia
- Region: Bryansk Oblast
- District: Kletnyansky District
- Time zone: UTC+3:00

Boryatino (Russian: Борятино) is a rural locality (a village) in Kletnyansky District, Bryansk Oblast, Russia. The population was 86 as of 2010. There is 1 street.

== Geography ==
Boryatino is located 18 km northwest of Kletnya (the district's administrative centre) by road. Osinovka is the nearest rural locality.
