= Obolenskoye, Zhukovsky District, Kaluga Oblast =

Coordinates: 54°53′41″N 36°55′20″E

Obolensk is also the name of a modern settlement (established 1975 as a base for the Soviet Biopreparat biological weapons program, and named for the historical city) in Serpukhovsky District, Moscow Oblast.

Obolensk (Russian: Оболенск) was a city in Russia, and in the medieval period one of the Upper Oka Principalities, situated at the Protva River (some 80 km south-to-southwest of Moscow, or some 20 km downstream (east) of Obninsk).

== History ==
It was established in c. 1270 by Yury, the fifth son of Mikhail of Chernigov. Ruled by the sovereign House of Obolensk in the 14th and 15th centuries, the principality was incorporated into the Grand Duchy of Moscow in 1494. The Obolensky family remained in power as governors. In the 1678 census of the Tsardom of Russia, the Obolensk district incorporated 146 villages with a total of 6,501 inhabitants.

Obolensk was stripped of its status as a city under Catherine II of Russia. The site of the old town is now the village of Obolenskoe in Zhukovsky District, Kaluga Oblast.
