= Belyov =

Town in Tula Oblast, Russia

Belyov Белёв
- Town
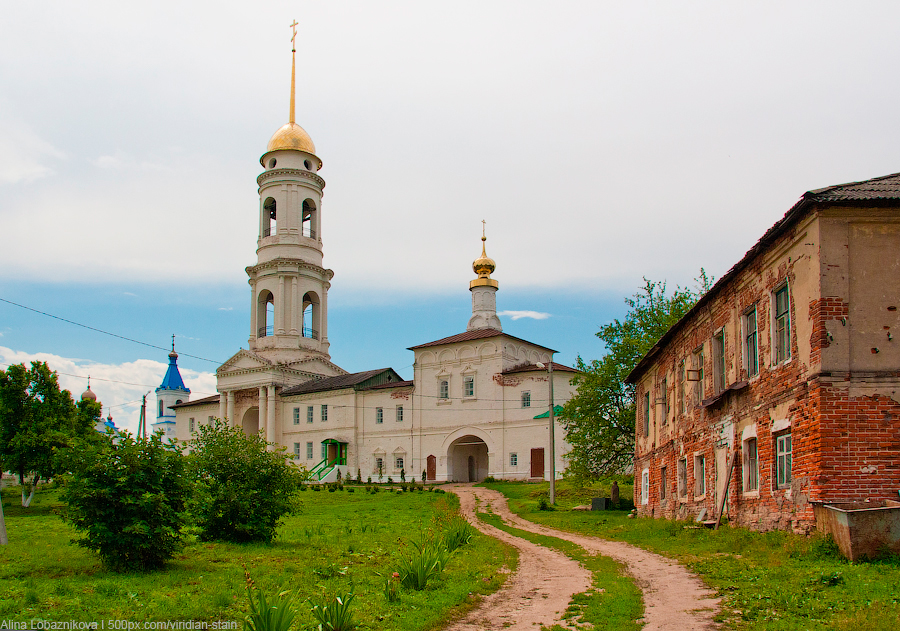

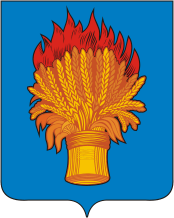
- Coat of arms
- Interactive map of Belyov
- Location of Belyov Belyov (Tula Oblast)
- Coordinates: 53°48′45″N 36°08′00″E
- Country: Russia
- Federal subject: Tula Oblast
- Administrative district: Belyovsky District
- Town under district jurisdictionSelsoviet: Belyov
- First mentioned: 1147

Area
  - Total: 8.58 km^{2} (3.31 sq mi)
- Elevation: 165 m (541 ft)

Population (2010 Census)
  - Total: 13,918
  - Estimate (2018)13180: 12,746 (−8.4%)
  - Density: 1,620/km^{2} (4,200/sq mi)

Administrative status
  - Capital of: Belyovsky District, Belyov Town Under District Jurisdiction

Municipal status
  - Municipal district: Belyovsky Municipal District
  - Urban settlement: Belyov Urban Settlement
  - Capital of: Belyovsky Municipal District, Belyov Urban Settlement
- Time zone: UTC+3 (MSK)
- Postal code: 301530–301532
- OKTMO ID: 70606101001

Belyov (Russian: Белёв) is a town and the administrative center of Belyovsky District in Tula Oblast, Russia, located on the left bank of the Oka River. Population: 13,180 (2018); 13,918 (2010 census).

== History ==
As is the case with many other towns in the former Upper Oka Principalities, Belyov was first mentioned in a chronicle in 1147. After the disintegration of the Principality of Chernigov in the wake of the Mongol invasion of Rus', Belyov became a seat of a local princely dynasty in 1468. The princes of Belyov fluctuated between the Grand Duchy of Lithuania and the Grand Duchy of Moscow, until they moved to the latter state.

During World War II, Belyov was occupied by the German Army in October, 1941, but was liberated by elements of 10th Army on December 31, during the Soviet counteroffensive phase of the Battle of Moscow.

Following an incident where a local Jewish families were accused of murdering a child to use his blood to bake matzah, there was a rise in anti-Jewish propaganda by Communist Party members. These allegations that Jews used the blood of Christians in rituals was embarrassing to the Communist Party when it came from Party Members, and a pogrom was narrowly averted in this instance. Some press sources from that time, most in Yiddish, condemned the inaction against the prominent community members and demanded adherence to Communist party policies on antisemitism.

== Administrative and municipal status ==
Within the framework of administrative divisions, Belyov serves as the administrative center of Belyovsky District. As an administrative division, it is incorporated within Belyovsky District as Belyov Town Under District Jurisdiction. As a municipal division, Belyov Town Under District Jurisdiction is incorporated within Belyovsky Municipal District as Belyov Urban Settlement.

== Architecture ==
The town contains one of the oldest churches in Tula Oblast.

== Economy ==
Belyov is home to Transmash railroad equipment factory. It is also famous for pastila whose production started in 1888 and was revived in 2010s.

== Notable people ==
- Zinaida Gippius
- Alexei Osipov

== See also ==
- Bibliography of Russian history
