= Meshchovsk =

Meshchovsk Мещовск
- Town
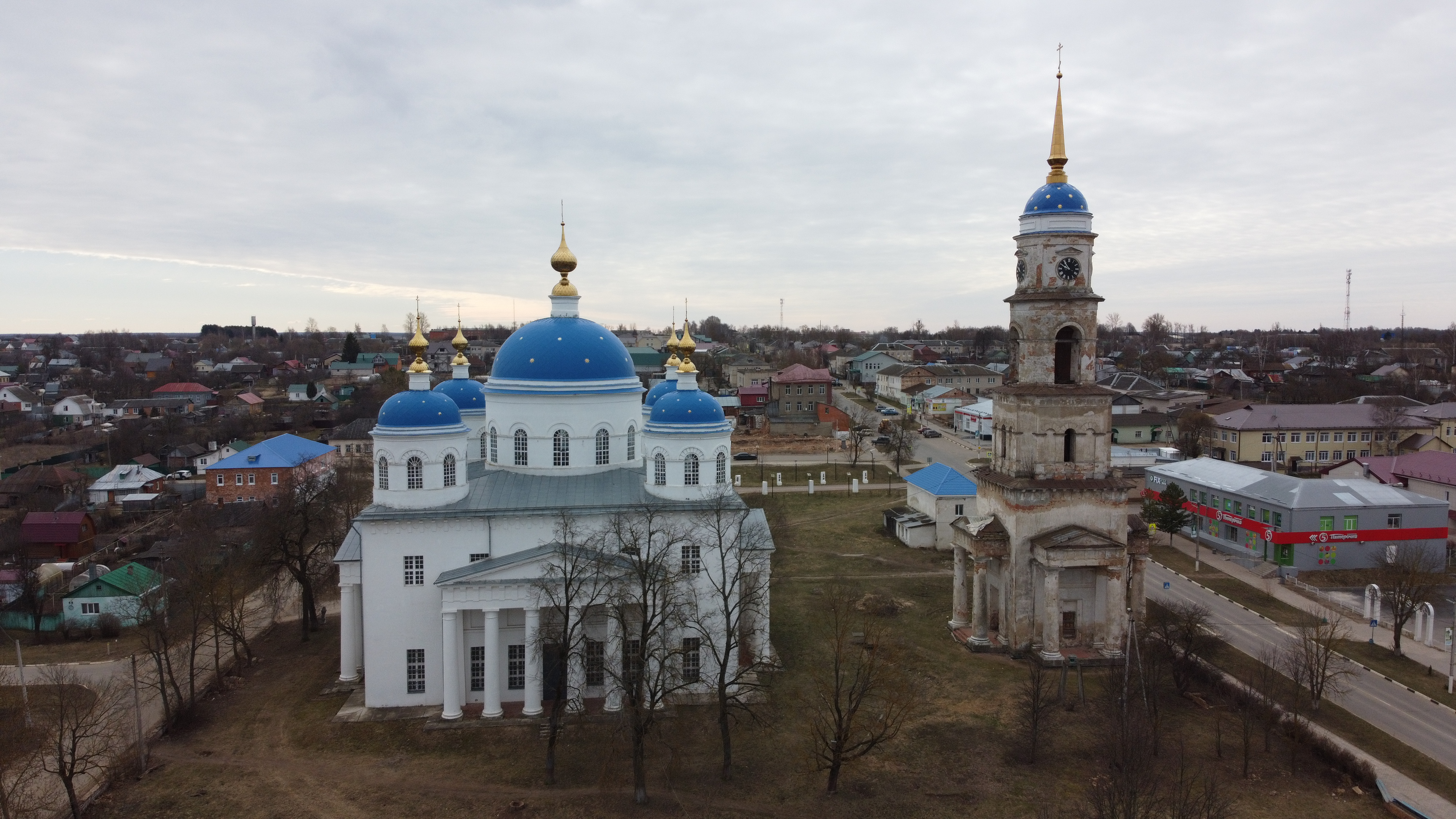
- New Cathedral of the Annunciation

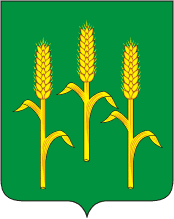
- Coat of arms
- Interactive map of Meshchovsk
- Location of Meshchovsk Meshchovsk (Kaluga Oblast)
- Coordinates: 54°19′28″N 35°16′51″E
- Country: Russia
- Federal subject: Kaluga Oblast
- Administrative district: Meshchovsky District
- First mentioned: 1238
- Town status since: 1776
- Elevation: 215 m (705 ft)

Population (2010 Census)
  - Total: 4,100
  - Estimate (2023): 3,722 (−9.2%)

Administrative status
  - Capital of: Meshchovsky District

Municipal status
  - Municipal district: Meshchovsky Municipal District
  - Urban settlement: Meshchovsk Urban Settlement
  - Capital of: Meshchovsky Municipal District, Meshchovsk Urban Settlement
- Time zone: UTC+3 (MSK)
- Postal code: 249240
- OKTMO ID: 29627101001

Meshchovsk (Russian: Мещо́вск) is a town and the administrative center of Meshchovsky District in Kaluga Oblast, Russia, located on the Tureya River 85 kilometers (53 mi) southwest of Kaluga, the administrative center of the oblast. Population: 3,810 (2021 census); 4,100 (2010 census); 4,540 (2002 census); 5,382 (1989 Soviet census).

== History ==
Historical affiliations

Principality of Mezetsk 1238–ca. 1400
Grand Duchy of Lithuania ca. 1400–1503
Grand Duchy of Moscow 1503–1547
Tsardom of Russia 1547–1721
Russian Empire 1721–1917
Russian Republic 1917
Soviet Russia 1917–1922
Soviet Union 1922–1991
Russian Federation 1991–present

It was first mentioned in Russian chronicles in connection with the Mongol invasion of Rus' in 1238. During the Middle Ages it was the patrimony of Princes Mezetsky.

Catherine the Great granted it town rights in 1776.

During World War II, Meshchovsk was occupied by the German Army from October 7, 1941, to January 7, 1942.

== Administrative and municipal status ==
Within the framework of administrative divisions, Meshchovsk serves as the administrative center of Meshchovsky District, to which it is directly subordinated. As a municipal division, the town of Meshchovsk, together with forty-eight rural localities, is incorporated within Meshchovsky Municipal District as Meshchovsk Urban Settlement.

== Architecture ==
Notable buildings include the old (1678–1696) and new (1829–1854) Orthodox cathedrals, both dedicated to the feast of the Annunciation.

== Notable people ==
It was the birthplace in 1846 of Vyacheslav von Plehve, the German-descended director of the Imperial Russian Police and later Minister of the Interior.

== See also ==
- Bibliography of Russian history
