= Peremyshlsky District =

Peremyshlsky District Перемышльский район (Russian)
- District
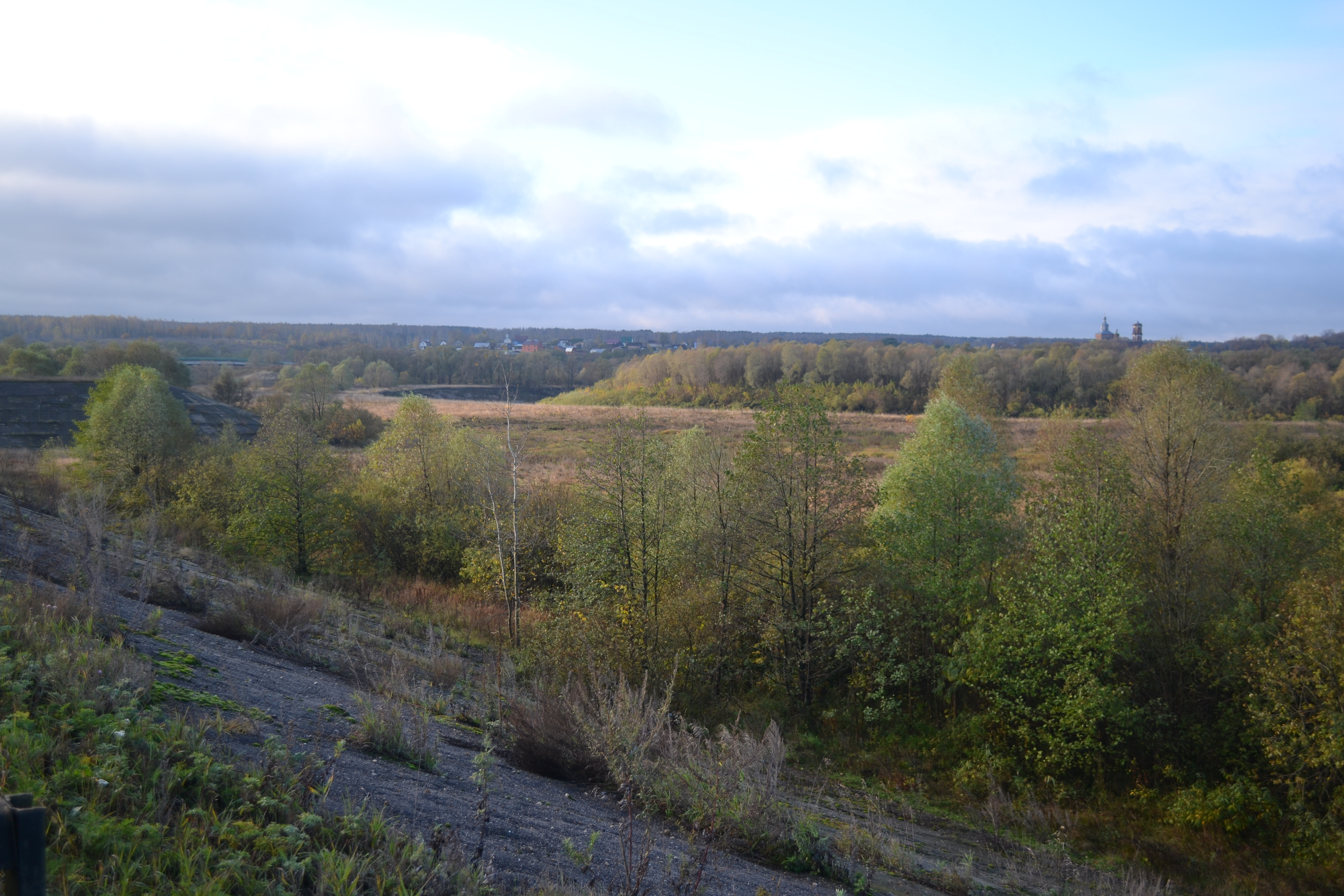
- View of village, Peremyshlsky District

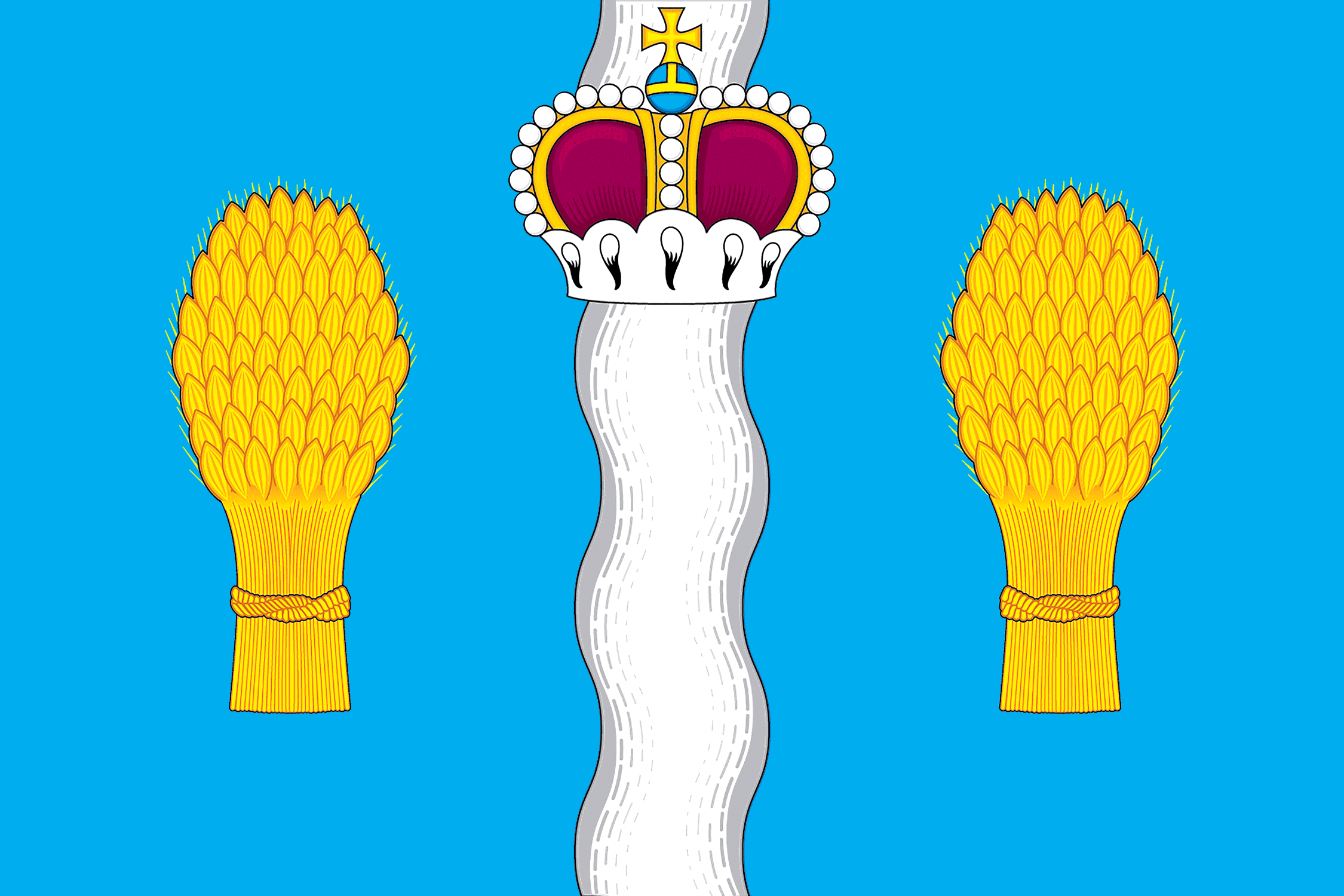
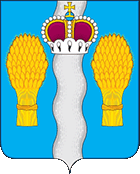
- Flag Coat of arms
- Location of Peremyshlsky District in Kaluga Oblast
- Coordinates: 54°14′49″N 36°09′47″E
- Country: Russia
- Federal subject: Kaluga Oblast
- Established: 12 July 1929
- Administrative center: Peremyshl

Area
  - Total: 1,156 km^{2} (446 sq mi)

Population (2010 Census)
  - Total: 14,137
  - Density: 12.23/km^{2} (31.67/sq mi)
  - Urban: 0%
  - Rural: 100%

Administrative structure
  - Inhabited localities: 145 rural localities

Municipal structure
  - Municipally incorporated as: Peremyshlsky Municipal District
  - Municipal divisions: 0 urban settlements, 16 rural settlements
- Time zone: UTC+3 (MSK)
- OKTMO ID: 29632000
- Website: http://xn----8sbnapgcdijslcphl1j5bv.xn--p1ai/

Peremyshlsky District (Russian: Перемы́шльский райо́н) is an administrative and municipal district (raion), one of the twenty-four in Kaluga Oblast, Russia. It is located in the east of the oblast. The area of the district is 1,156 square kilometers (446 sq mi). Its administrative center is the rural locality (a selo) of Peremyshl. Population: 14,422 (2021 census); 14,137 (2010 census); 13,952 (2002 Census); 16,105 (1989 Soviet census). The population of Peremyshl accounts for 25.0% of the district's total population.
