= Bogorodskoye toy =

Russian wooden toy

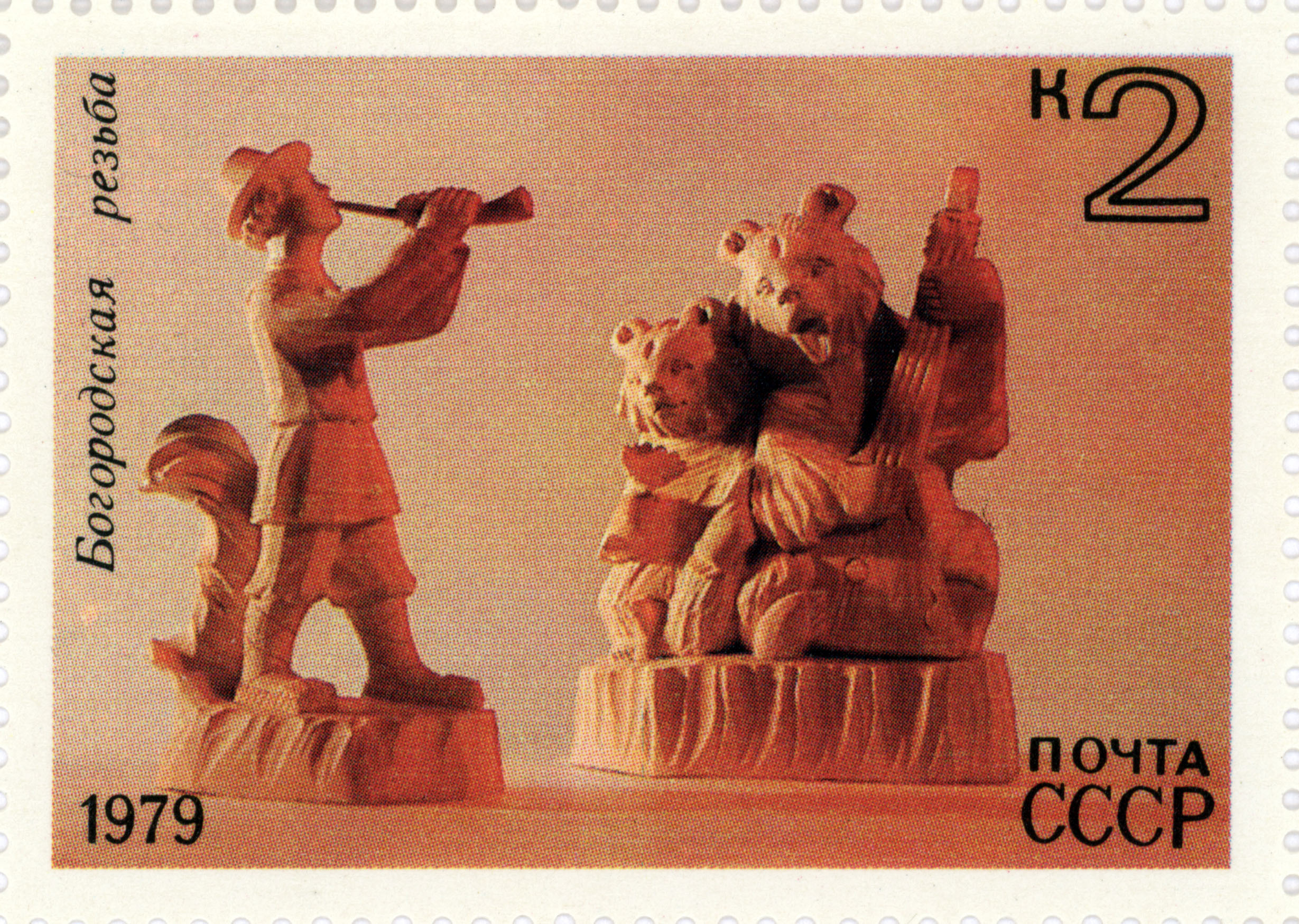
- Soviet 1979 postage stamp showing the "Blacksmiths", the canonical Bogorodskoye action toy
- Type: Carved wooden action toys and sculpture
- Invented by: Traditional folk craft, Trinity Lavra workshops
- Company: Bogorodskoye Wood-Carving Factory (since 1923)
- Country: Russia
- Availability: 17th century–present
- Materials: Lime wood, aspen, occasionally birch

The Bogorodskoye toy (Russian: Богородская игрушка), also called Bogorodsk carving (Богородская резьба), is a Russian folk art tradition of carved wooden toys and figurines made in the village of Bogorodskoye, Moscow Oblast. The village sits about 30 kilometres from the Trinity Lavra of St. Sergius, the monastery whose toy workshops gave the local craft its start in the 17th century.

Most Bogorodskoye carvings are made from soft lime wood cut from a single block. Many are left unpainted, with the natural grain of the wood as the finish. The tradition is known above all for action toys: small mechanical figures driven by a pegged base or a hanging weight, in which a peasant and a bear take turns striking an anvil, or a chicken family pecks at a board. The "Blacksmiths" ('Kuznetsy', Кузнецы), in which a man and a bear hammer alternately at an anvil, is the canonical example. It was used on a Soviet postage stamp in 1979 and appears on the modern coat of arms of Bogorodskoye village.

The craft passed through several phases: a 17th- and 18th-century workshop tradition tied to the monastery, an independent cottage industry from the mid-19th century, an artel system from 1913, and a Soviet cooperative factory from 1923 that gave the craft national prominence. By the early 21st century the workshop in Bogorodskoye employed only about 18 carvers, compared with more than 250 at its mid-Soviet peak.

== History ==
=== Monastery origins ===
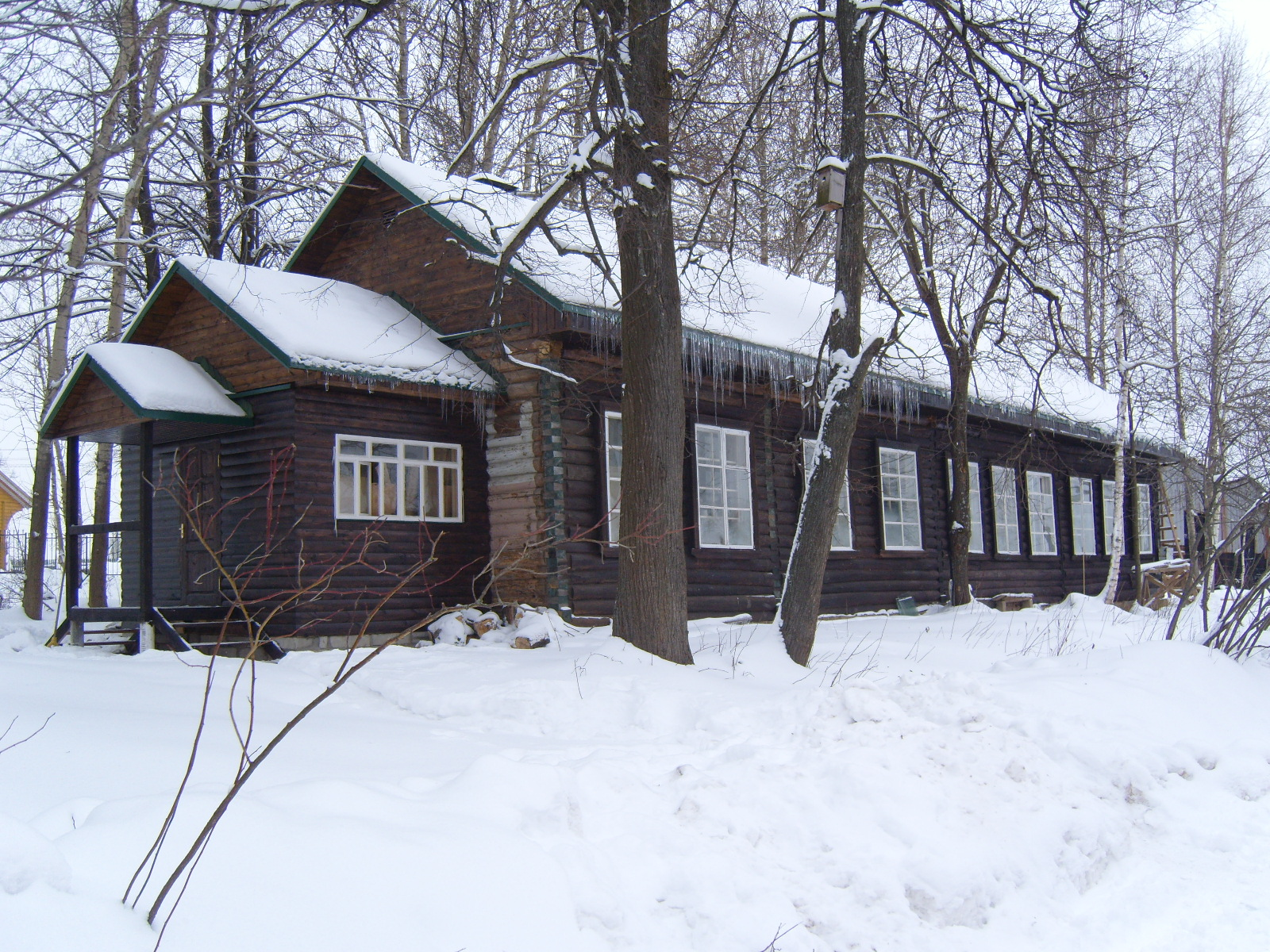
The Bogorodskoye Wood-Carving Factory building, the modern successor to the 1913 artel

Toy carving in the Bogorodskoye area began in the 17th century in the workshops of the Trinity Lavra of St. Sergius. The monks and lay carvers of the Lavra produced devotional pieces, painted icons and small wooden figures for sale to pilgrims. The village of Bogorodskoye, around 30 kilometres from the monastery, gradually took on the rougher carving work. At first the villagers cut only the parts and sent them to be assembled and finished at Sergiyev Posad. By the early 19th century the Bogorodskoye carvers were handling the whole process themselves.

According to local legend recorded by the journalist Georgy Manaev, the tradition is traced symbolically to Saint Sergius of Radonezh, the 14th-century founder of the Lavra, who is said to have carved small wooden figures for the children of his lay workers.

=== Independent cottage craft (mid-19th century) ===
By the middle of the 19th century the centre of wooden toy carving had shifted to Bogorodskoye and the village's craft became distinct from the painted-figure tradition of Sergiyev Posad. Specialists name the 1840s to 1870s as the high point of the cottage form. Carvers such as A. N. Zinin and the artist P. N. Ustratov, himself a native of Bogorodskoye, are credited with shaping the unpainted "Bogorodsk style". Each family specialised in a single category of figure. One household carved birds, another bears, another peasants, another nativity scenes. Even unpainted, the pieces sold well, because the grain of the lime wood was itself a finish.

=== Zemstvo period (1890–1913) ===
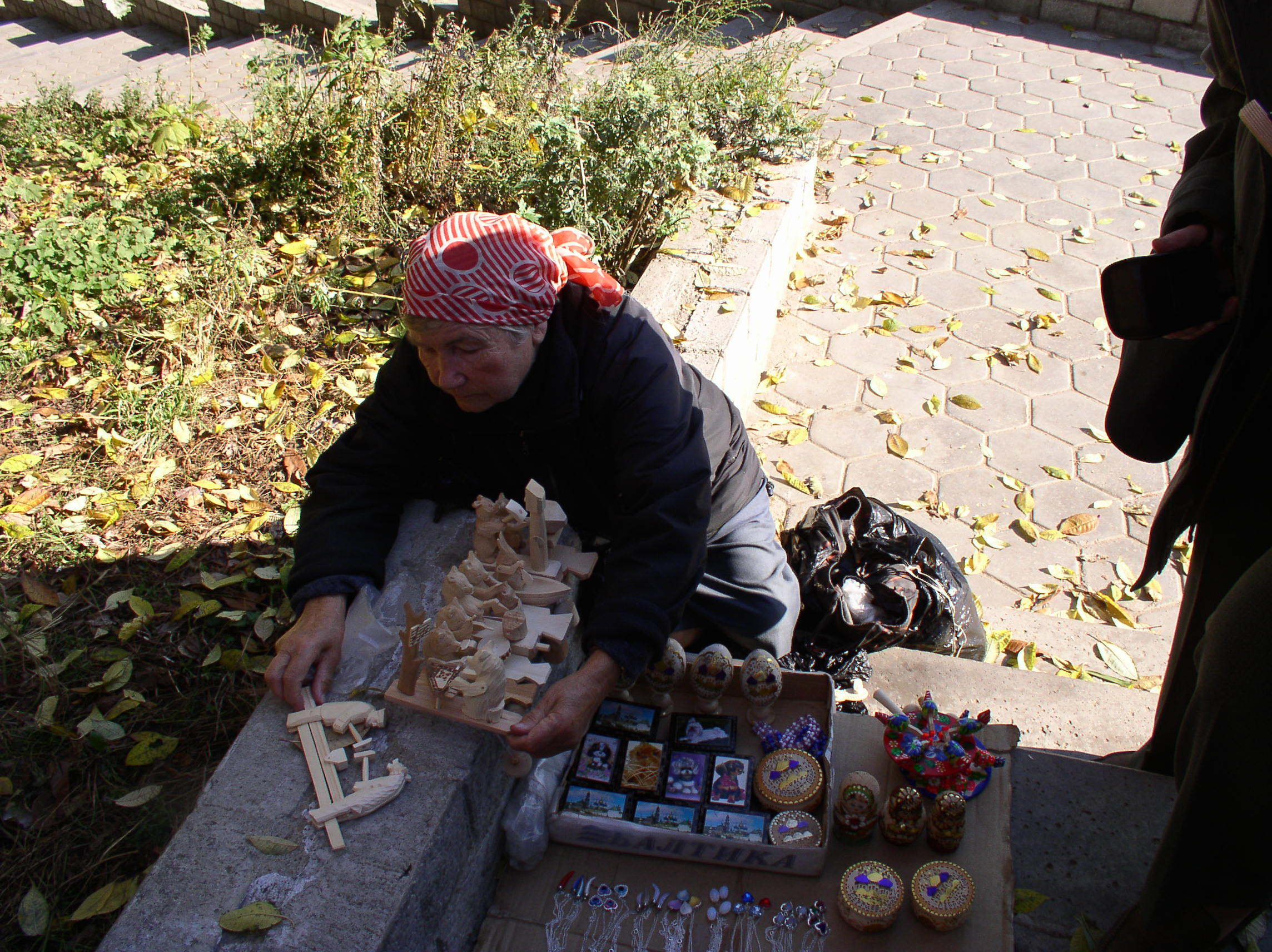
A toy merchant in Sergiyev Posad, the regional centre through which Bogorodskoye toys reached domestic and foreign markets.

From the 1890s the Moscow Zemstvo worked to support traditional crafts that were under pressure from cheaper factory-made goods. In 1891 the zemstvo opened a training-and-display workshop in Sergiyev Posad that combined a research function with sales of toys at home and abroad. The Moscow Handicraft Museum, established a few years earlier with support from the industrialist Savva Morozov, played a parallel role.

The collector and artist Nikolai Bartram, who would later found Moscow's Toy Museum, was one of the most active figures in the revival. Bartram pushed the Bogorodskoye carvers to model their figures on the work of professional designers in a "folk style", which the artist and critic Alexandre Benois denounced as an artificial form of preservation.

The artel was rebuilt in 1923 as the Bogorodsky Wood Carver cooperative (Russian: Артель «Богородский резчик») and quickly became one of the leading Soviet folk-craft enterprises. A wood-carving school opened in the village the following year. Through the late 1920s the carvers exported large numbers of pieces. Production peaked in the 1930s, when a new form of large "sculpture toy" was introduced under the influence of professional artists at the Scientific Research Institute of Artistic Industry (NIIKhP). The bear became the most-used motif in Bogorodskoye toys from the 1960s onwards, partly because of its long-standing role in Russian fairy tales and folk songs.

=== After 1991 ===
The post-Soviet collapse of the state purchasing system reduced demand sharply. The Bogorodskoye Wood-Carving Factory continued in operation under a new private structure but at a much smaller scale. By the late 2010s the workshop employed about 18 carvers, compared with more than 250 in its mid-Soviet peak. Local schools have run apprentice classes to keep the tradition going.

== Materials and technique ==
=== Wood ===
Bogorodskoye carvings are made above all from lime wood (Tilia, lipa), which is soft, even-grained and resistant to splitting. Aspen and occasionally birch are also used. The wood is air-dried for two to three years before carving begins.

=== Tools and cut ===
The carvers use a small set of bent and straight knives, including the distinctive "Bogorodsky knife" with a short angled blade. The figure is cut from a single block. Many pieces show a deliberately faceted surface that preserves the knife marks, in contrast with the smooth polished finish of the Sergiyev Posad painted toys.

=== Action mechanisms ===
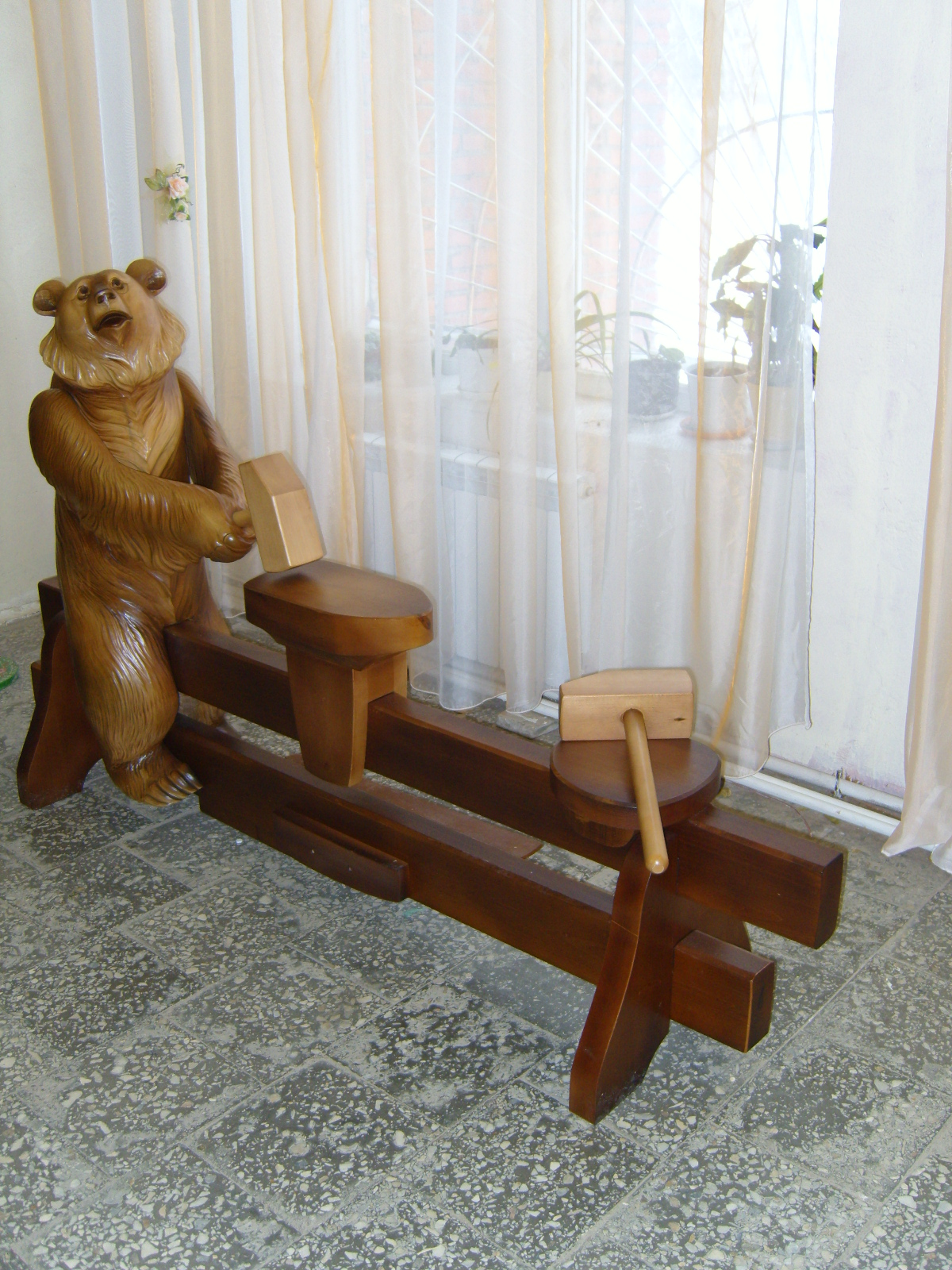
A bear figure, the standard subject of modern Bogorodskoye carving.

The Bogorodskoye tradition is best known for its three classical action mechanisms:

- Slatted base (planka): two parallel slats slide back and forth, and figures pinned across them perform alternating actions, as in the "Blacksmiths" with a man and a bear.
- Pegged turntable (tumbochka): a knob turns hidden cams that drive the figures, as in the chicken family pecking at corn.
- Hanging weight (shar na nitke): a ball on a string hangs below the figures, and swinging the ball makes the figures move, as in the "Mice Burying the Cat" composition.

These mechanisms turn what is at base a static sculpture into a small piece of folk theatre. The 19th-century "Mice Burying the Cat" composition, based on the lubok satirical print of the same name, became a stock subject and is still made today.

== Subjects ==
The earliest Bogorodskoye subjects were peasants, farm animals, hunting scenes and figures from Russian folklore. From the 1960s the bear became the dominant motif. Recurring scenes include the bear at work as a blacksmith, the bear playing musical instruments, the bear and the peasant ploughing together, and the bear with cubs. Religious carvings, important in the early Lavra workshops, fell out of production under the Soviet system but were revived after 1991. Several modern Bogorodskoye carvers produce nativity figures and small icons alongside the traditional toys.

== Cultural status ==
The Bogorodskoye craft has been treated by Russian cultural institutions as one of the canonical living folk-art traditions of central Russia, alongside Khokhloma painting, Dymkovo toys and Gzhel ceramics. The Russian National Commission for UNESCO has placed Bogorodskoye carving in its overview of national folk-craft traditions worth international support. The Sergiyev Posad Toy Museum holds the largest collection of historical Bogorodskoye pieces. The Soviet postal service released a series of stamps featuring Bogorodskoye toys in 1979, the most familiar of which shows the "Blacksmiths".

The All-Russian Museum of Decorative, Applied and Folk Arts in Moscow held a dedicated exhibition of Bogorodskaya wooden toys in late 2013, displaying historical pieces from the Soviet artel period alongside contemporary work and noting that "no Russian folk craft has shown the same continuity of form across three centuries".

International collectors have sustained a parallel market for Bogorodskoye pieces since the late 19th century. Catalogues from the 1900-1914 zemstvo workshops record substantial export sales to Germany, Britain and the United States.

== See also ==
- Folk art
- Khokhloma
- Dymkovo toys
- Filimonovo toy
- Matryoshka doll
- Trinity Lavra of St. Sergius
- Nikolai Bartram
- Lubok
