= Odoyev =

Odoyev Одоев
- Urban-type settlement
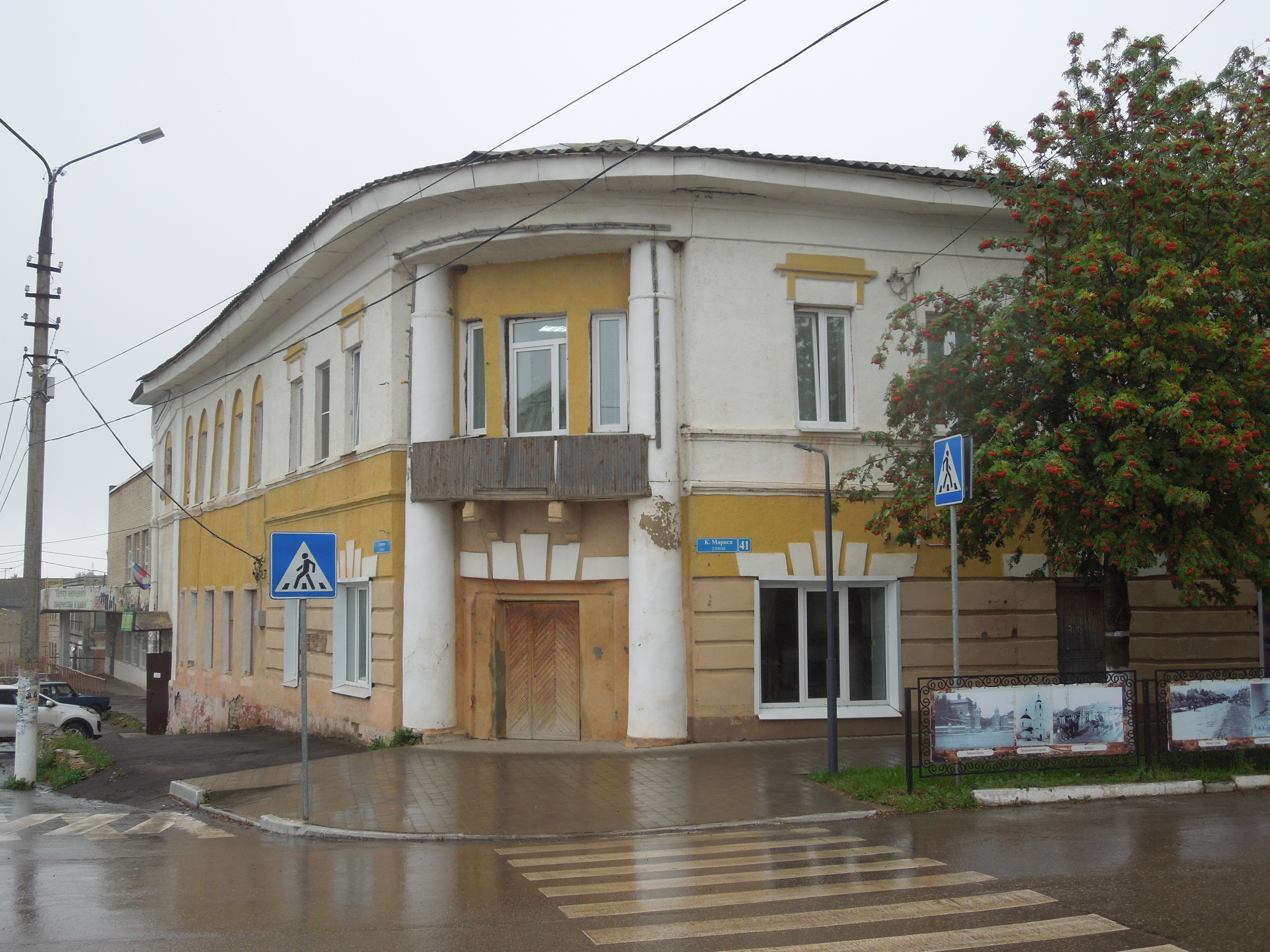

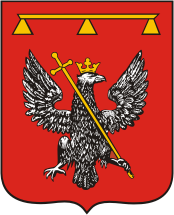
- Coat of arms
- Interactive map of Odoyev
- Location of Odoyev Odoyev (Tula Oblast)
- Coordinates: 53°56′32″N 36°41′59″E
- Country: Russia
- Federal subject: Tula Oblast
- First mentioned: 1242/1376

Government
  - Body: Deputy Assembly
  - Head: Galina Fendel

Area
  - Total: 6.73 km^{2} (2.60 sq mi)
- Elevation: 205 m (673 ft)

Population
  - Estimate (2018): 5,468 )

Administrative status
  - Capital of: Odoyevsky District

Municipal status
  - Municipal district: Odoyevsky District
- Time zone: UTC+3 (MSK)
- Postal code: 301440
- Dialing code: +7 48736
- OKTMO ID: 70636151051
- Website: odoev.tularegion.ru

Odoyev (Russian: Одо́ев) is an urban-type settlement in the west of Tula Oblast, Russia. It serves as the administrative center of Odoyevsky District. It sits on the left bank of the Upa river, a right tributary of the Oka river, 75 kilometres (47 mi) away from Tula. Prior to 1926, Odoyev had town status.

== History ==
=== Early history ===
Odoyev was first mentioned in 1376, when Prince Roman Semyonovich of Novosil, relocated his seat from Novosil to here. However, the fortress of Oduyev, mentioned in 1242, is associated with Odoyev. In 1380 the town was mentioned in the Novgorod Chronicle, in regards with the battle of Kulikovo. However, it is safe to say that a stronghold here should have been since the times the land was occupied by the Vyatichi. Odoyev, alongside many other places in the basin of the Oka, was once within the territory of the Vyatichi.

Since 1376, Odoyev was the center of a principality. However, the princes of Odoyev styled themselves as princes of Novosil, and sometimes as princes of Novosil and Odoyev until the late 15th century, while the title of prince of Odoyev was fully adopted only by the mid-16th century. The seat in Odoyev, as the successor of Novosil, was considered the senior of the Upper Oka principalities. The princely house of Odoyev died out in the 19th century.

Odoyev's history was closely associated with its location between the Grand Duchy of Lithuania, the Grand Principality of Moscow, and the Golden Horde. The Odoyev principality managed to maintain its independence and be considered relatively sovereign in international relations until the late 15th century. Along with the other Russian principalities, the Odoyev principality received the jarlig from the khan of the Golden Horde. The first jarlig was obtained by the Novosil principality in 1326. The Odoyev principality had trade relations with the Horde, selling beaver and marten fur and honey and importing pottery, coins and iron caldrons.

On May 20, 1407, Odoyev was captured and burned down by Lithuanian troops. By 1427, five princes of the house of Novosil and Odoyev had concluded a treaty with the grand duke of Lithuania, Vytautas; this treaty served as the basis for future treaties with Lithuania. The treaty implied that Vytautas would not attack the lands of the princes of Novosil and Odoyev, while the latter would be his vassals and serve to him, assisting in his foreign policy. Vitautas promised help in case of war without interfering in their relations with Moscow and Ryazan. The princes of Novosil and Odoyev had the right to break the treaty in case there was no desire to prolong it, if there was a violation of its conditions, or on the death of one of the parties. The princes of Odoyev were given large lands in the Grand Duchy of Lithuania under the condition to pay yearly tribute from them.

In 1442, Prince Fyodor Lvovich of Novosil, the founder of the house of Vorotynsky, defected to the Polish king Casimir IV and the Lithuanian grand duke. Prince Fyodor Lvovich's reign was marked by his anti-Moscow policy and he even planned a plot against Vasily II. During his reign, junior princes of the house of Odoyev did not serve the grand prince of Moscow.

Following the end of the Lithuanian–Muscovite war of 1433—1453, the situation had changed for the Upper Oka Principalities. The principality of Mozhaysk lost its independence and the local prince escaped to Lithuania. Moscow seized lands from Kaluga to Aleksin, near Odoyev.

In 1459, Prince Fyodor Lvovich concluded a new treaty with Lithuania. In 1483, Prince Ivan Yuryevich of Novosil and Odoyev concluded yet another treaty with Lithuania.

In the late 15th and early 16th century, the Odoyev principality was split between the Crimean Khanate, the Grand Duchy of Lithuania and the Grand Principality of Moscow. Odoyev faced multiple attacks from the Tatars in 1422, 1423, 1512, and 1562.

In 1494, under the treaty between Moscow and Lithuania, the Odoyev principality became a vassal of Moscow. In the early 16th century, Vasili III of Russia freed Odoyev from tribute to the Crimean Khanate. Since then, the princes of Odoyev served at the Moscow court as boyars. However, Odoyev started to decline.

=== Russian Empire ===
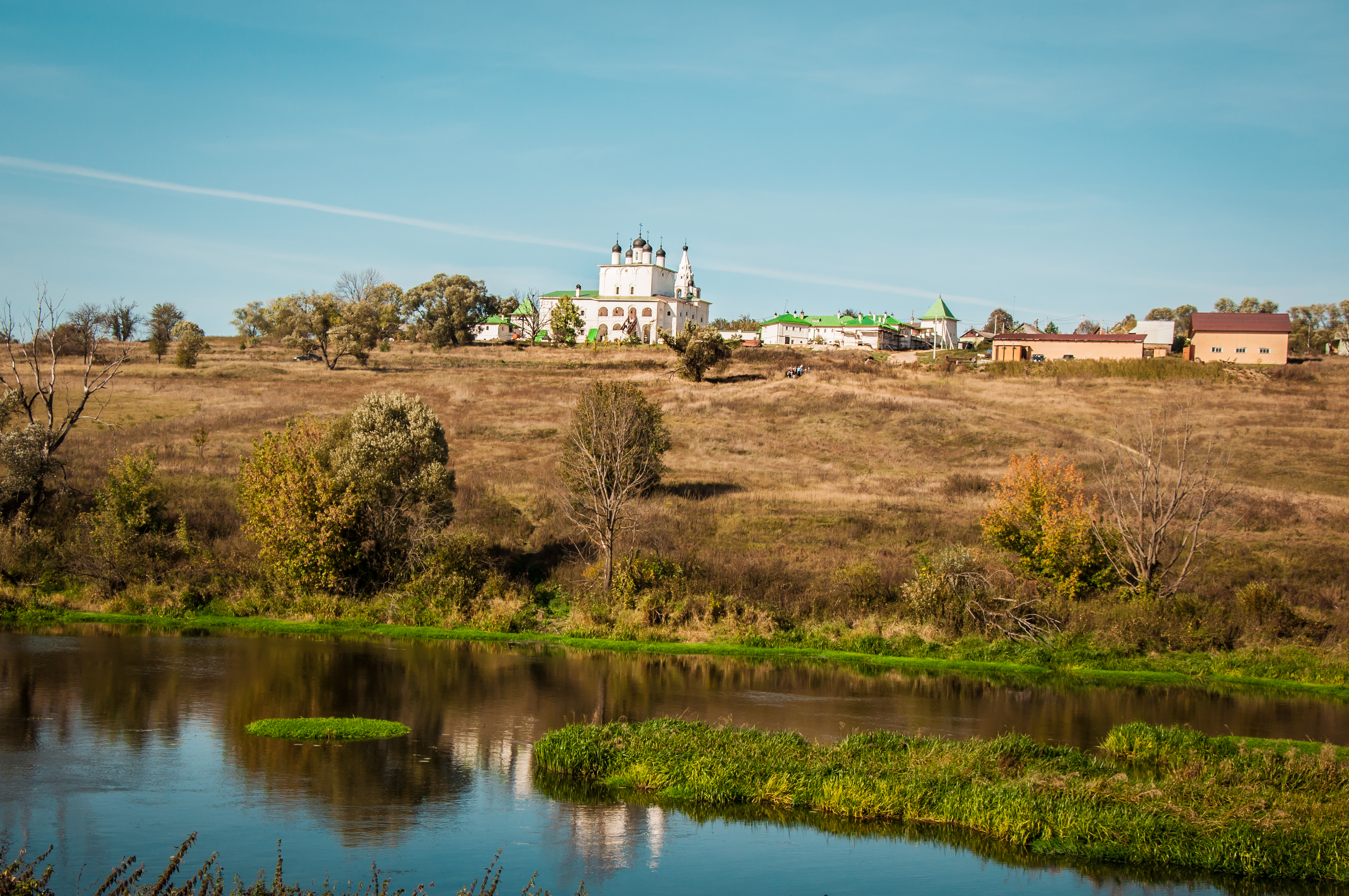
A view of the Anastasovo Monastery

In the 16th century, Odoyev was a typical stronghold on the southern frontier of Muscovy, when Ivan the Terrible took the town over from the house of Odoyev. But as early as 1645, Odoyev became neglected: the towers of the fortress lost their roofs, the bridge had decayed, while the water well was empty.

In the first half of the 18th century Odoyev was part of the Kiev, Smoleynsk and Moscow Governorates until 1777, when it became part of Tula Governorate.

In 1777, Catherine the Great confirmed a coat-of-arms for the town, which was based on the coat-of-arms of Chernigov.

In 1779, Catherine the Great confirmed the general city plan for Odoyev. By the early 19th century, the population of Odoyev was two thousand; the town had seven churches, seven taverns, and six plants, while in 1838 the first girls' boarding school in Tula Governorate was opened here.

During the 19th century, Odoyev was a trading town using the navigation on the Upa River. Then Odoyev had a racetrack holding regular horse races. Odoyev was famed for its gardens; almost every resident of the town owned one and it was covered in vegetation. The legend has it that the pastila from Antonovka apples from Odoyev was served at the dinner of Ivan the Terrible.

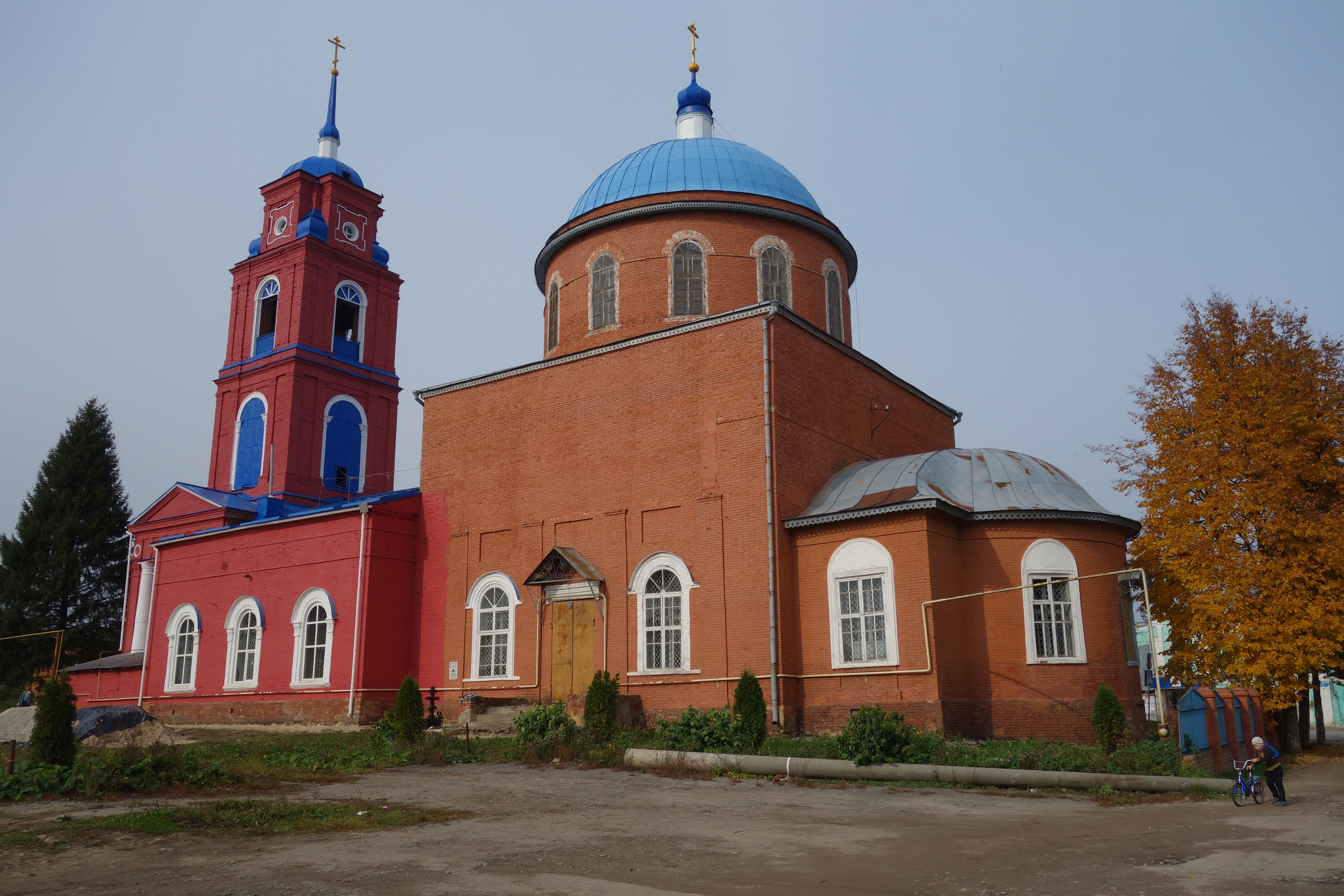
The Church of the Holy Trinity

In the early 16th century, the Vorotynsky princes built the Monastery of the Nativity of the Holy Mother, which was closed down in the 18th century and ended up in a ruinous state during the Soviet period. Its successor is the Anastasovo Monastery, located in the village of Anastasovo, near Odoyev. By the late 19th century, Odoyev had had six churches, but currently only one has survived – the Church of the Holy Trinity. In 1842, the local gentry initiated the opening of an amateur philanthropy theater. In 1912, an amateur wind band was founded, which still exists. In 1919, a musical school was founded in the town.

=== Recent history ===
In 1926, Odoyev was made a rural settlement, and in 1959, it became a workers' settlement.

Odoyev is listed with the heritage settlements of Russia.

== Economy ==
The economy of Odoyev, as well as Odoyevsky District, in general, is primarily agricultural. The main focus of the local industry is dairy, fruit processing and baking. The district has two major plants: a butter dairy and a vegetable and fruit cannery. 57% of the district's population works in agriculture. Most of the district's output goes to Tula or is distributed in the Tula Oblast.

== Culture and tourism ==
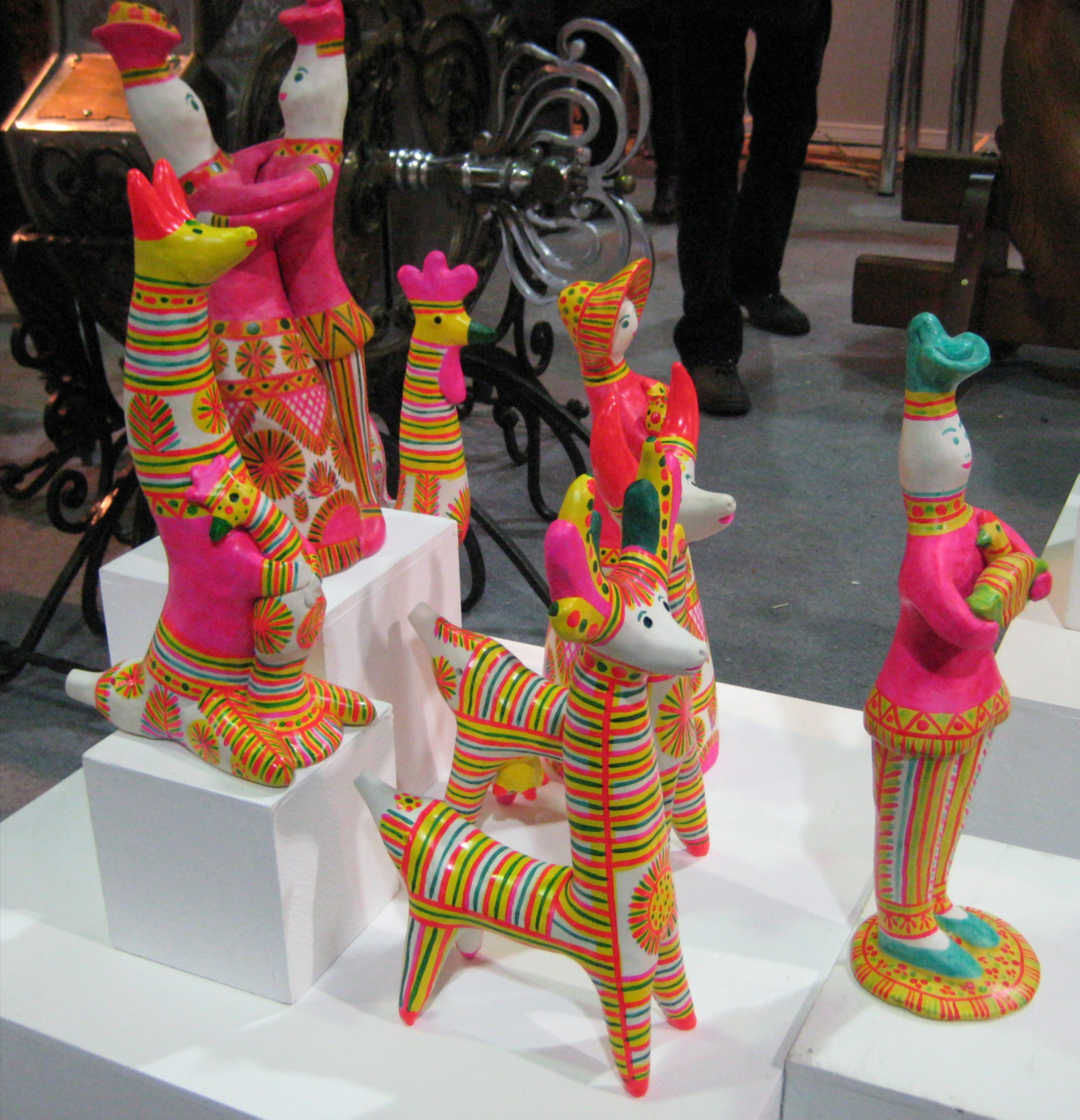
Filimonovo toys

Odoyev is a small township that is continuously declining. The touristic potential of the place and the area is still to develop. The district is famed for its Filimonovo toys originating in the village of Filimonovo, 8 km away from Odoyev. The Filimonovo toys museum is located here. Odoyev also has a museum of local history.

== Notable people ==
- Vladimir Uspensky (1927–2000), Russian writer
- Alexander Uvarov (1922–1994), Soviet ice hockey player
- Ivan Rodionov (1852–1881), Russian poet
- Konstantin Bogolepov (1913–1983), Soviet scientist

== See also ==
- Odoyevsky family
