= Manolov =

Manolov (masculine, Bulgarian: Манолов) or Manolova (feminine, Bulgarian: Манолова) is a Bulgarian surname. Notable people with the surname include:

- Alek Manolov (born 1986), Bulgarian footballer
- Aleksandar Manolov (born 1990), Bulgarian footballer
- Anton Manolov (born 1937), Bulgarian sport shooter
- Dimiter Manolov (1940–1998), Bulgarian conductor
- Emanuil Manolov (1860–1902), Bulgarian composer
- Kiril Manolov (born 1976), Bulgarian opera singer
- Manol Manolov (1925–2008), Bulgarian footballer and manager
- Maya Manolova (born 1965), Bulgarian politician
- Miroslav Manolov (born 1985), Bulgarian footballer
