= Tales of the Alhambra =

1832 collection of essays and stories by Washington Irving

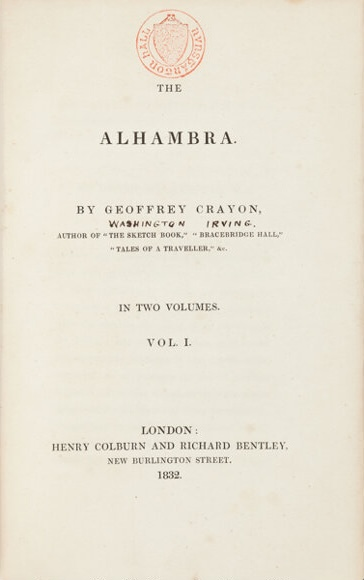
- Title page of first London edition, 1832
- Author: Washington Irving
- Original title: The Alhambra: A Series of Tales and Sketches of the Moors and Spaniards
- Language: English
- Subject: Spanish history, the Alhambra
- Genre: Travel literature
- Publisher: Carey & Lea, Henry Colburn
- Publication date: 1832 (revised 1851)
- Publication place: United States & United Kingdom (concurrently)
- Media type: Print: hardback octavo
- Pages: 607, in two volumes
- Dewey Decimal: 910

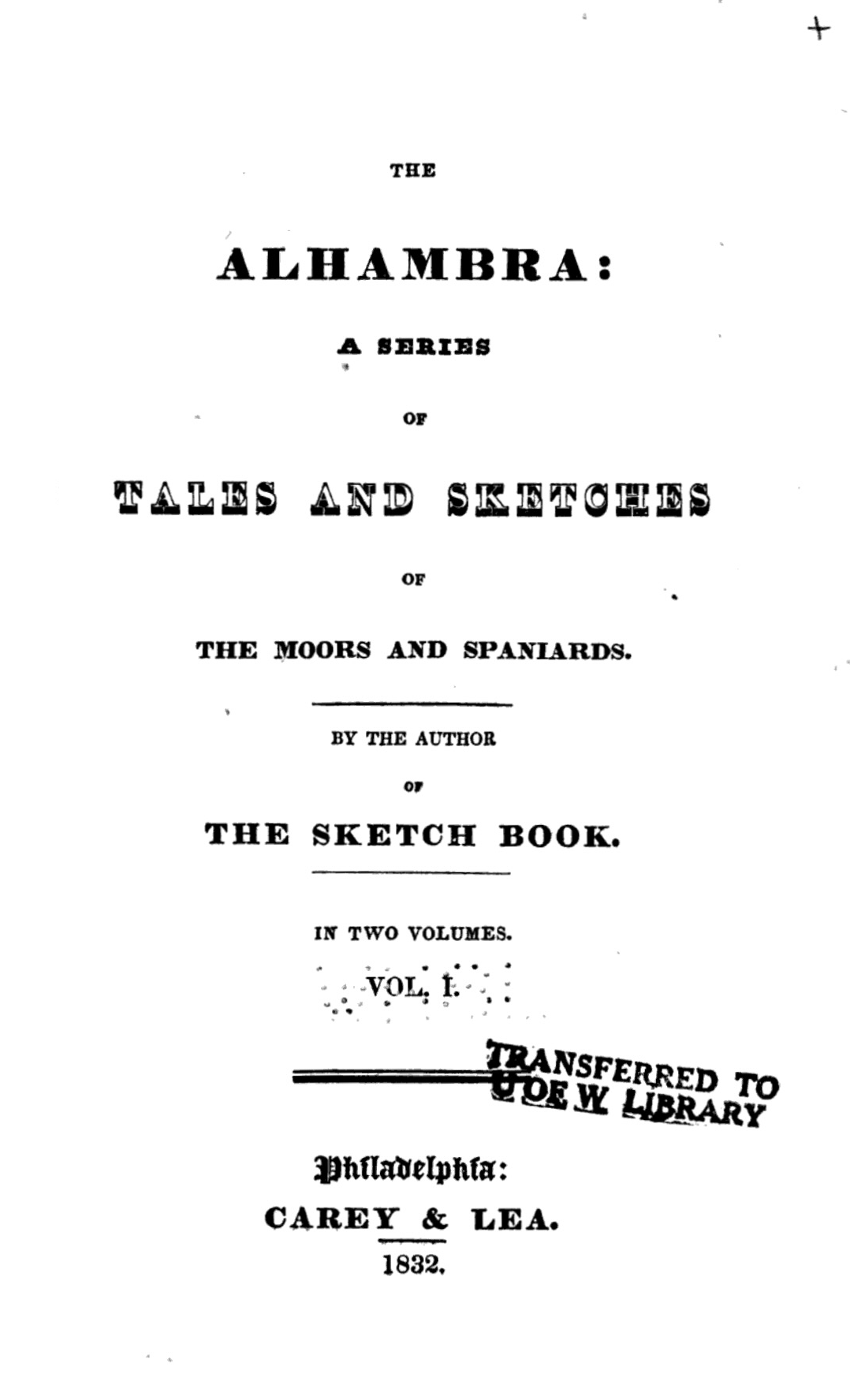
Title-page of The Alhambra: A Series of Tales and Sketches of the Moors and Spaniards, first American edition, Philadelphia 1832

The Alhambra: A Series of Tales and Sketches of the Moors and Spaniards is an 1832 collection of essays, verbal sketches and stories by American author Washington Irving (1783–1859) inspired by, and partly written during, his 1828 visit to the palace/fortress complex known as the Alhambra in Granada, Andalusia, Spain.

== Background ==
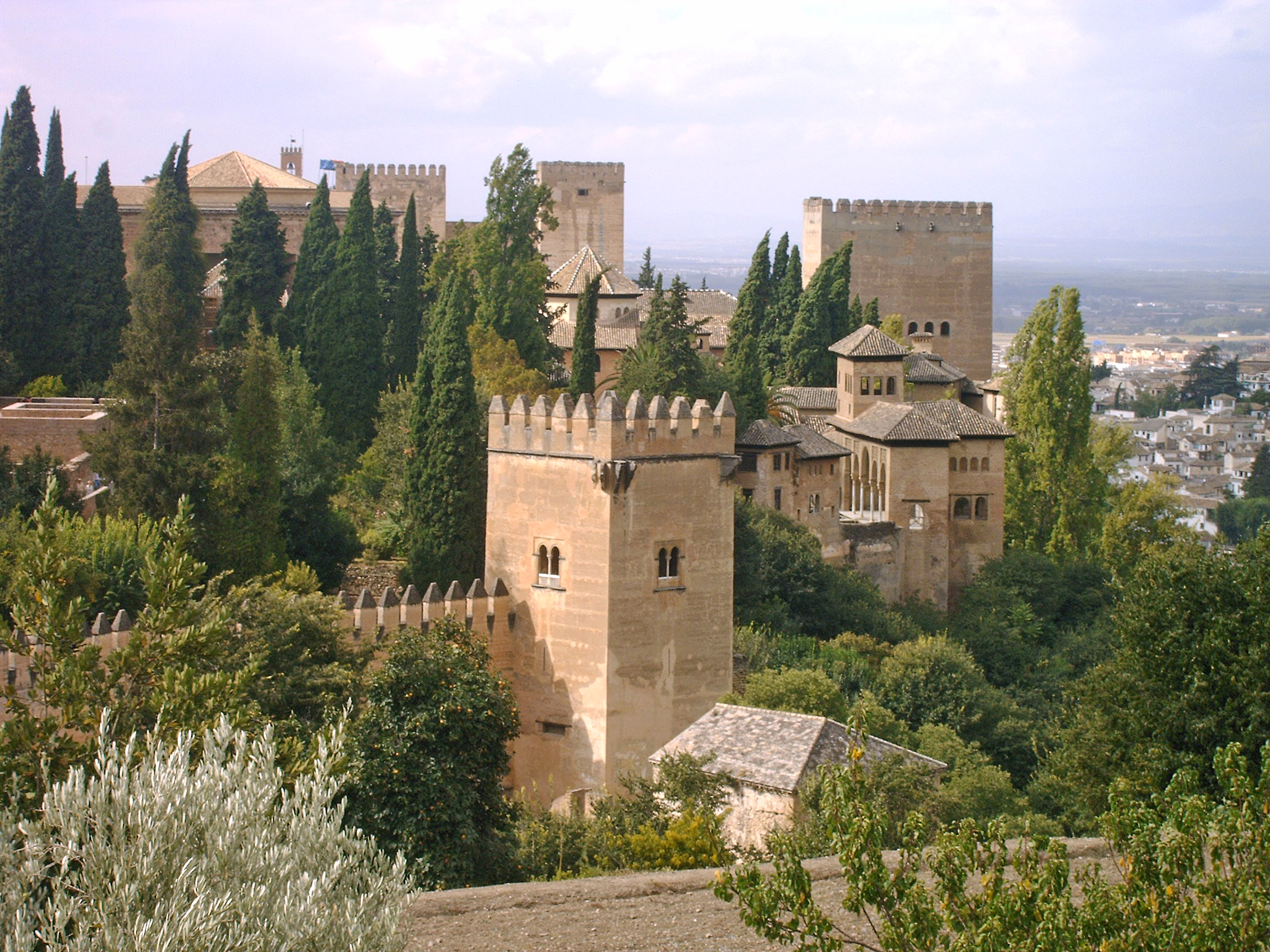
Irving lived at the Alhambra Palace while writing some of the material for his book.

Shortly after completing a biography of Christopher Columbus in 1828, Washington Irving travelled from Madrid, where he had been staying, to Granada, Spain. At first sight, he described it as "a most picturesque and beautiful city, situated in one of the loveliest landscapes that I have ever seen." Irving was preparing a book called A Chronicle of the Conquest of Granada, a history of the years 1478–1492, and was continuing his research on the topic. He immediately asked the then-governor of the historic Alhambra Palace as well as the archbishop of Granada for access to the palace, which was granted because of Irving's celebrity status. Aided by a 17-year-old guide named Mateo Ximenes, Irving gathered legends and tales about the Alhambra, and then left for other parts of Spain. The following year, he returned to the Alhambra and lived in an apartment there for about three months, and was given access to its archives. Irving was inspired by his experiences to write Tales of the Alhambra. The book combines description, myth and narrations of real historical events, even up through the destruction of some of the palace's towers by the French under Count Sebastiani in 1812, and the further damage caused by an earthquake in 1821. Throughout his trip, Irving filled his notebooks and journals with descriptions and observations, though he did not believe his writing would ever do it justice. He wrote, "How unworthy is my scribbling of the place." Irving continued to travel through Spain until he was appointed as secretary of legation at the United States Embassy in London, serving under the incoming minister Louis McLane. He arrived in London by late September 1829.

== Publication history ==
The Alhambra: a series of tales and sketches of the Moors and Spaniards was published in May 1832 in the United States by publishers Lea & Carey and concurrently in England by Henry Colburn, and attributed to "Geoffrey Crayon". Consisting of a series of essays and short fiction pieces, it was referred to as his "Spanish Sketch Book". Shortly after the book's publication, Irving returned to New York after a 17-year absence from the United States.

In 1851, Irving wrote an "Author's Revised Edition", titled The Alhambra.

== Legacy and influence ==
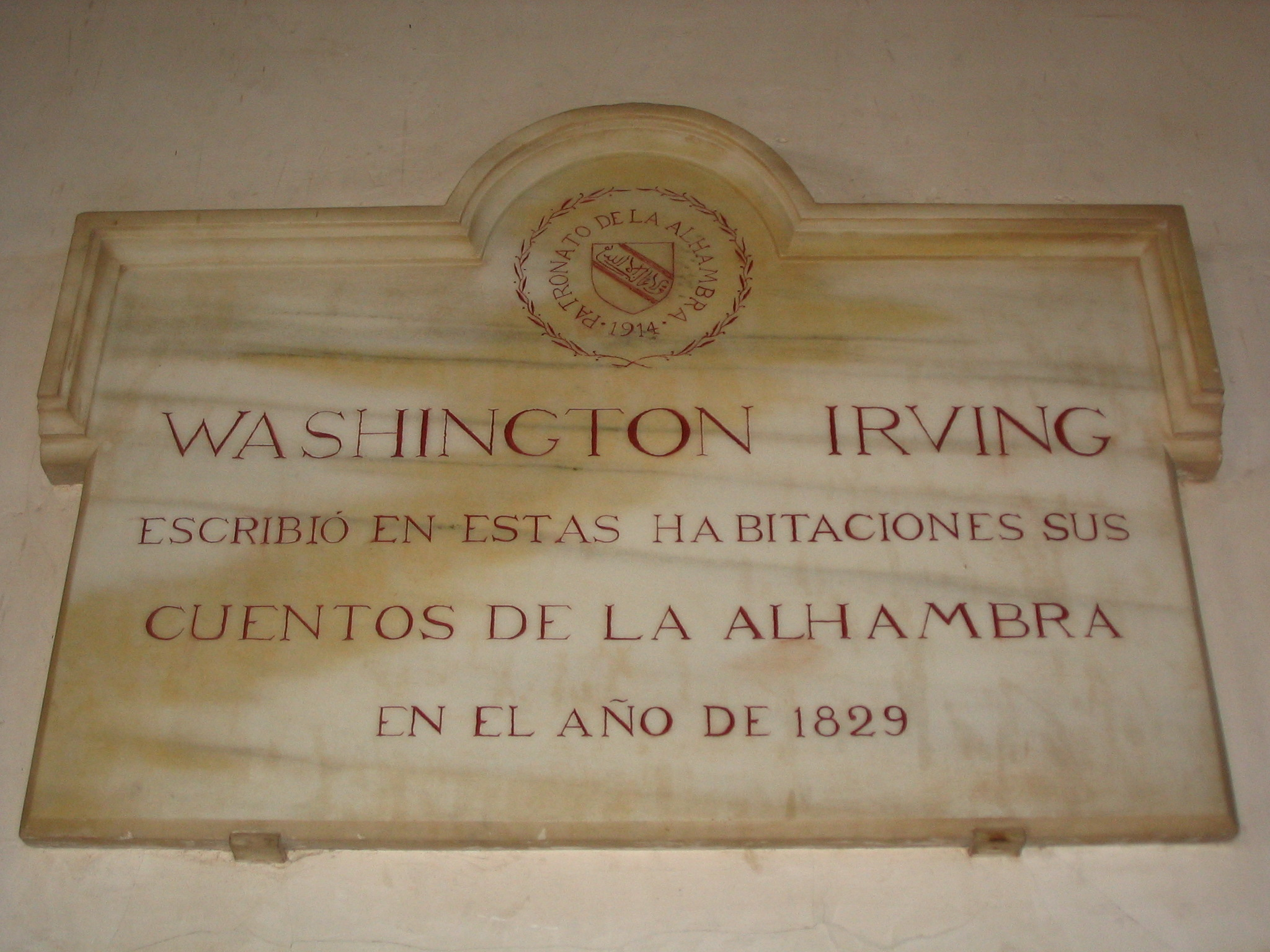
Commemorative plaque at the Alhambra, saying "Washington Irving wrote his Tales of Alhambra in these rooms in 1829" in Spanish

The book was instrumental in reintroducing the Alhambra to Western audiences. A plaque now marks the rooms in which Irving stayed while writing some of his book.

Alexander Pushkin's 1834 tale in verse The Tale of the Golden Cockerel is based on two chapters of Tales of the Alhambra. In turn, the Pushkin poem inspired Vladimir Belsky's libretto for the opera "The Golden Cockerel" by Nikolay Rimsky-Korsakov.

The book was translated into Bengali by Taslimuddin Ahmad in the 19th century.

Dudley Buck set portions of the text of the Don Munio chapter for his 1874 oratorio The Legend of Don Munio.

Erwin von Busse published a collection of short stories called Liebesmärchen or "Lovers Fairy Tales" based on the Tales of the Alhambra in Germany in 1921.

The book serves as the basis of the 1950 Spanish film Tales of the Alhambra.

The Legend of the Moor's Legacy has been adapted into a Soviet cartoon in 1959.

Villa Zorayda, a museum in St. Augustine, Florida based on a wing of the Alhambra, takes its name from a character in Irving's book (specifically from "Legend of the Three Beautiful Princesses").

The city of Alhambra, California is named after the book. In 1874, the daughter of Benjamin Wilson was reading the book and encouraged him to use the name for his new Los Angeles suburban development.

Legend of Prince Ahmed Al Kamel or The Pilgrim of Love has been adapted as the children’s picture book Prince of the Birds, written and illustrated by Amanda Hall in 2005.

In 2017, Spanish animation producer Pedro Alonso Pablos made an animated miniseries featuring some of the Tales of the Alhambra: The Arab Astrologer, The three beautiful princesses and The rose of the Alhambra.
