= Bogorodskoye, Moscow Oblast =

Bogorodskoye Богородское
- Urban-type settlement
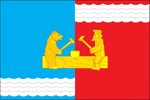
- Flag
- Interactive map of Bogorodskoye
- Location of Bogorodskoye Bogorodskoye (Moscow Oblast)
- Coordinates: 56.4940°N 38.1833°E
- Country: Russia
- Federal subject: Moscow Oblast
- Administrative district: Sergiyevo-Posadsky District
- Elevation: 207 m (679 ft)

Population (2010 Census)
  - Total: 9,108
  - Estimate (2025): 9,705 (+6.6%)
- Time zone: UTC+3 (MSK)
- Postal code: 141342
- OKTMO ID: 46615153051

Bogorodskoye (Russian: Богородское) is an urban locality (an urban-type settlement) in Sergiyevo-Posadsky District of Moscow Oblast, Russia. Population: 9,108 (2010 census); 9,352 (2002 census); Known for their carved wooden toys.
