= Nikolai Bartram =

Russian illustrator, poster designer, art historian, and collector

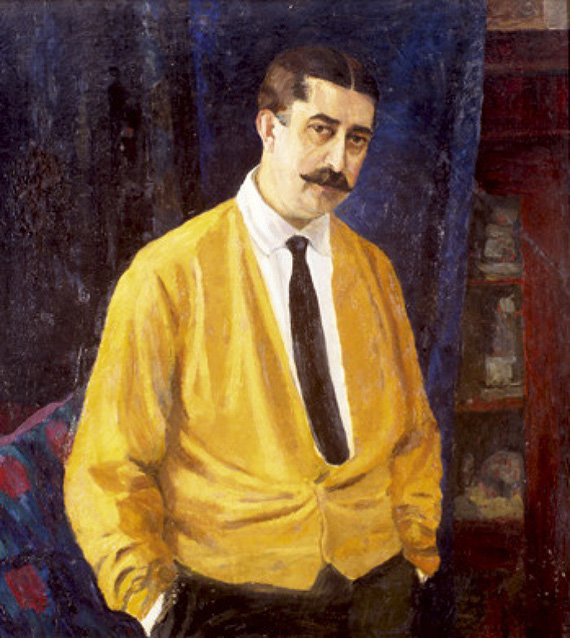
Nikolai Bartram; portrait by his wife, Yevdokia (c. 1920)

Nikolai Dmitrievich Bartram (Russian: Николай Дмитриевич Бартрам; 5 September 1873 – 13 July 1931) was a Russian illustrator, poster designer, art historian, and collector.

== Biography ==
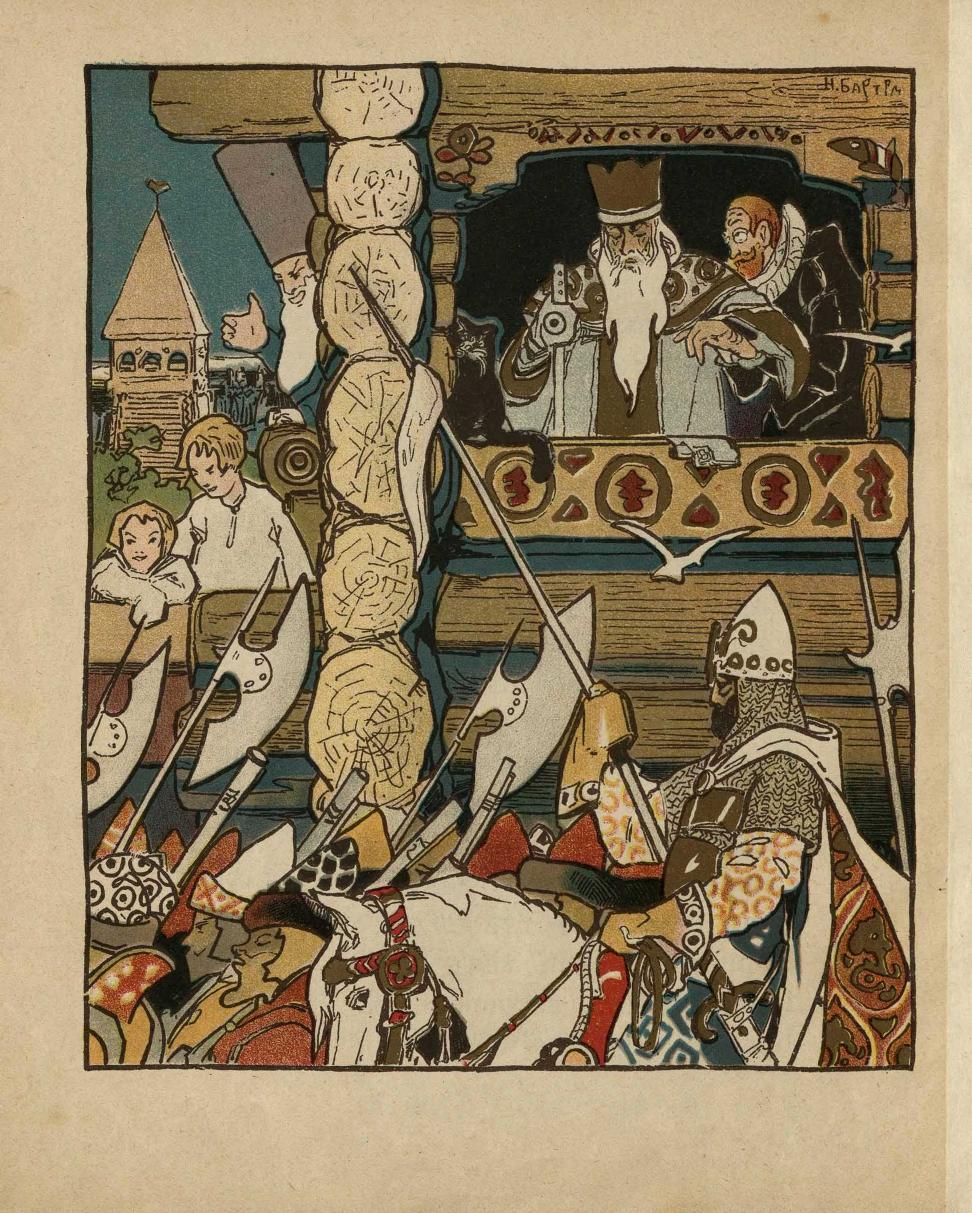
Illustration for The Tale of the Golden Cockerel

His father, Dmitri Ernestovich Bartram, was a watercolor artist, who had a small workshop where he made toys. Nikolai learned to paint and draw at an early age. When he was sixteen, he began studying at the Moscow School of Painting, Sculpture and Architecture, but had to quit after two years, due to poor health. Back home, he organized a workshop for the manufacture of wooden toys, which he directed for ten years.

He also studied the history of toys in Russia. This led him to the works of the historian, Ivan Zabelin, and the ethnographer, Vera Kharuzina, both of whom became acquaintances. He then began collecting toys, foreign and domestic, as well as making trips to the provinces to collect old clothing and household items.

From 1900 to 1903, he travelled throughout Europe; visiting toy shops and returning with suitcases of dolls, toy soldiers, and toy animals. He also developed an interest in children's books and created illustrations for several old Russian folktales. From 1904, he served as an artist for the Moscow Zemstvo and, until 1917, was head of the art department at the Museum of Handicrafts. He organized a workshop there, making dolls with porcelain heads, dressed in folk costumes. His shop also created the first "architectural toys" in Russia; based on historic buildings and towers.

In 1912, he married the artist and collector, Yevdokia Loseva, who joined him in his various enterprises. In October 1918, as World War I was winding down, he and Yevdokia founded the Moscow Toy Museum; although it was not opened to the general public until 1921. Many of the items displayed had been taken from nationalized estates, by the Bolshevik government. In 1924, it was moved to a nearby mansion. Bartram remained its Director until his death.

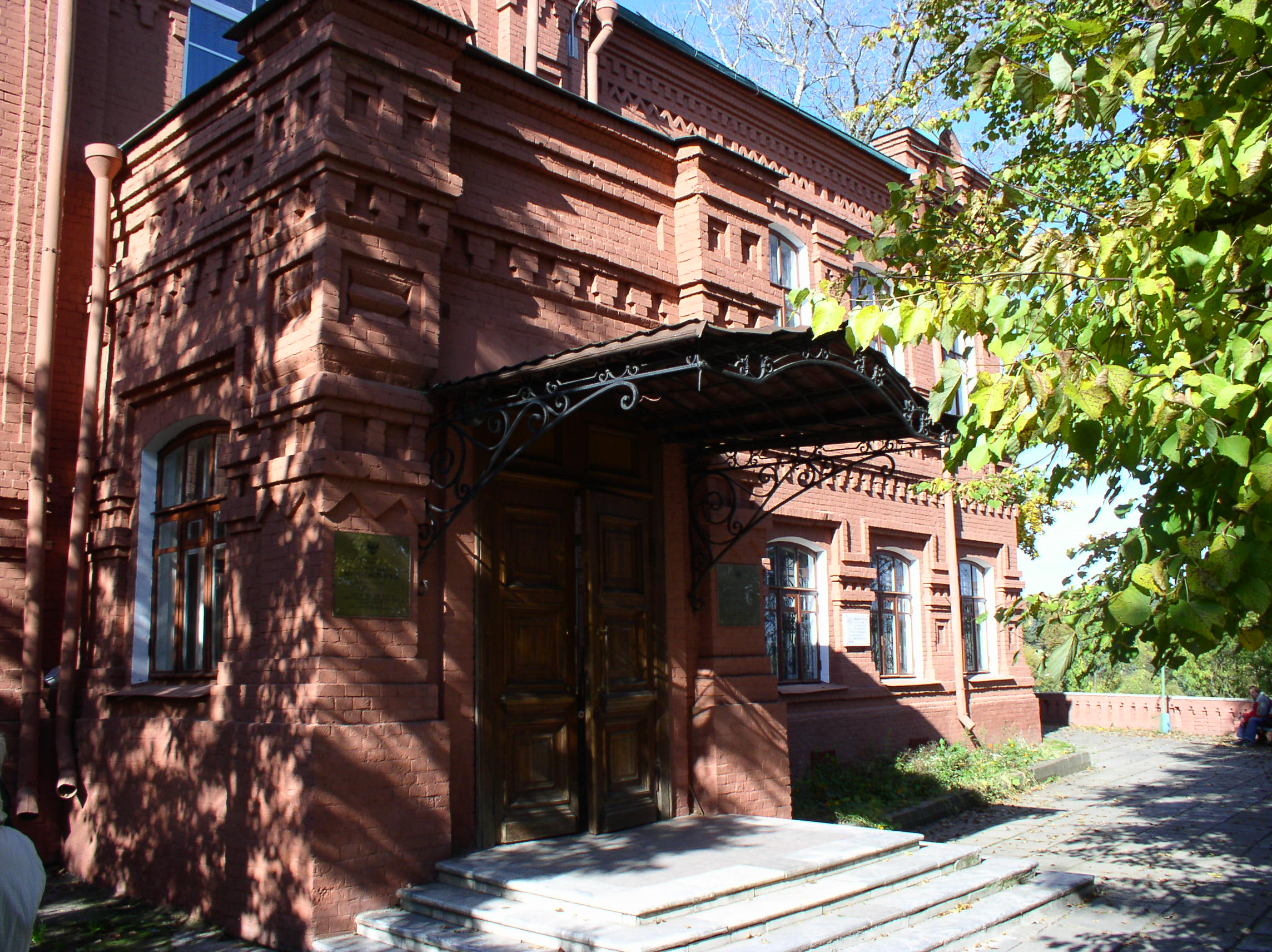
The Toy Museum in 2005

He was a member of numerous organizations. In 1916, he was appointed Chairman of the Union of Decorative Arts and Art Industry Workers. Later he served as head of the Decorative Arts Commission at the People's Commissariat for Education, as well as belonging to their Commission for the Protection of Monuments of Art and Antiquity. He was also elected to the State Academy of Artistic Sciences.

He died in 1931, aged only fifty-seven, and was interred at Novodevichy Cemetery. Shortly after his death, the toy museum was moved to Zagorsk. In 1980, it was moved to its current location in Sergiyev Posad.
