= Odoyevsky District =

Odoyevsky District Одоевский район (Russian)
- District
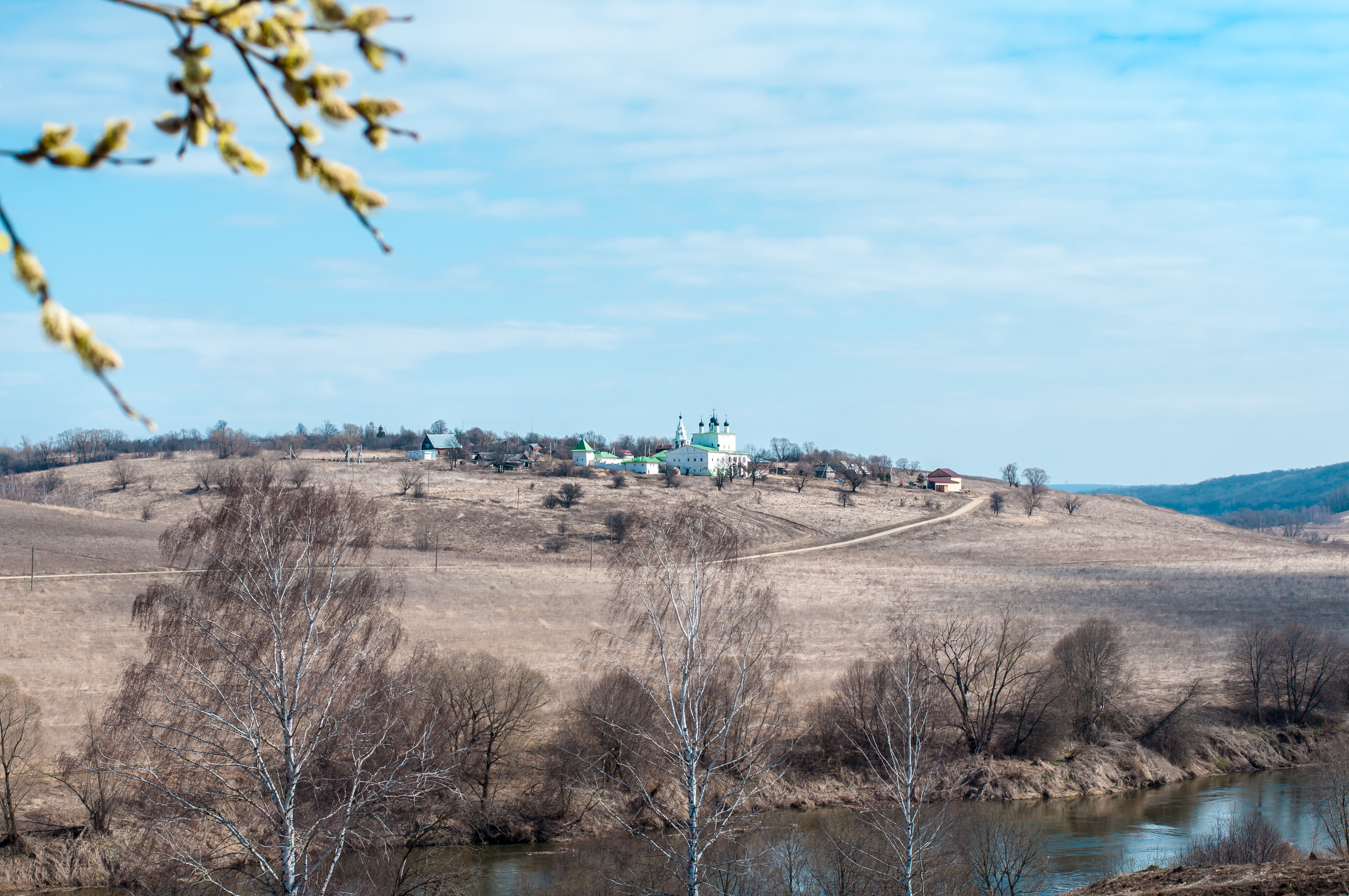
- Monastery Nativity Anastasia: Anastasovo, Odoyevsky District

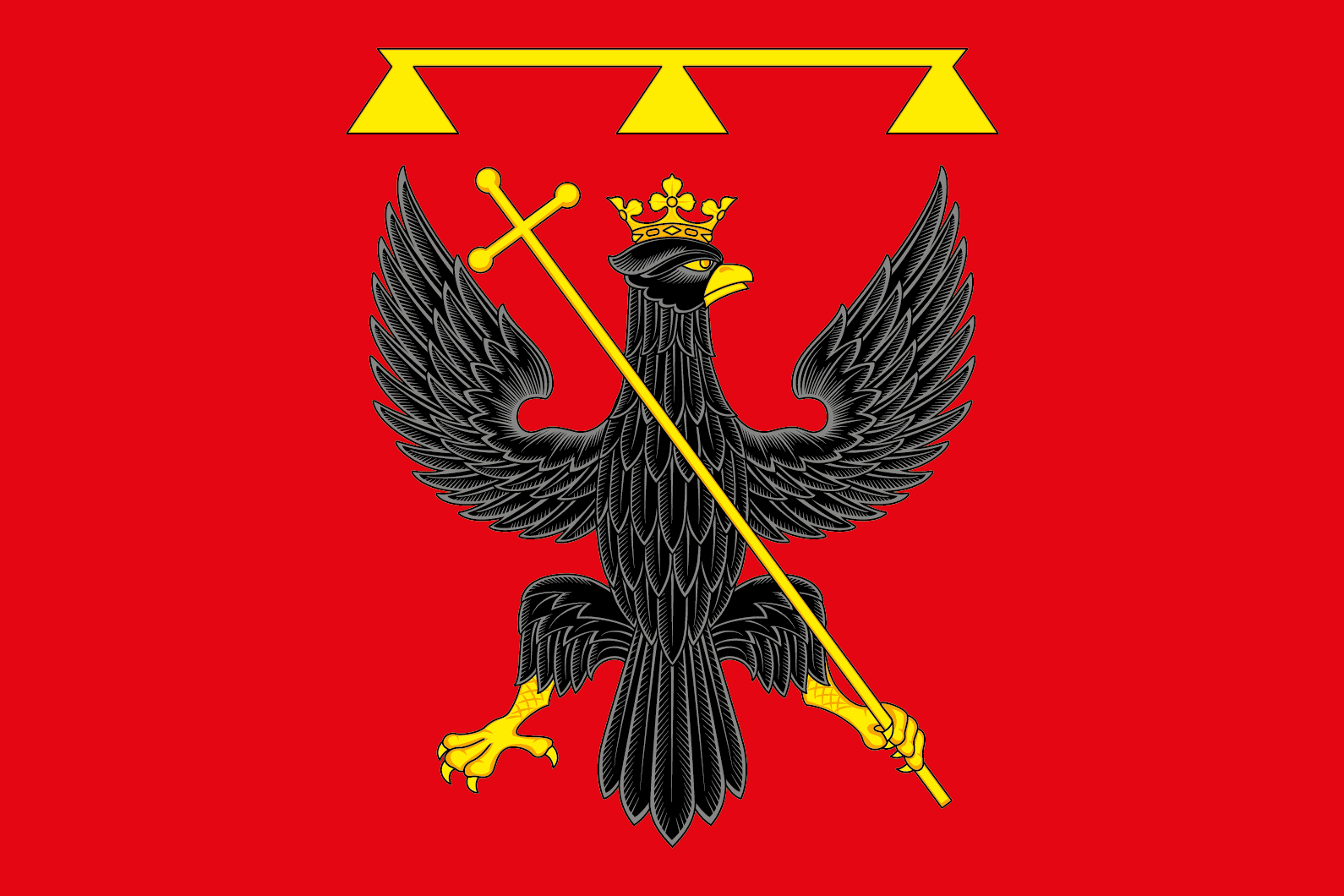
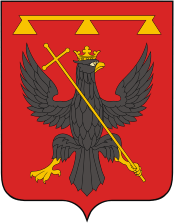
- Flag Coat of arms
- Location of Odoyevsky District in Tula Oblast
- Coordinates: 53°56′32″N 36°41′59″E
- Country: Russia
- Federal subject: Tula Oblast
- Established: 20 June 1924
- Administrative center: Odoyev

Area
  - Total: 1,182 km^{2} (456 sq mi)

Population (2010 Census)
  - Total: 13,184
  - Density: 11.15/km^{2} (28.89/sq mi)
  - Urban: 46.6%
  - Rural: 53.4%

Administrative structure
  - Administrative divisions: 1 Urban-type settlements, 12 Rural administrations
  - Inhabited localities: 1 urban-type settlements, 134 rural localities

Municipal structure
  - Municipally incorporated as: Odoyevsky Municipal District
  - Municipal divisions: 1 urban settlements, 3 rural settlements
- Time zone: UTC+3 (MSK)
- OKTMO ID: 70636000
- Website: http://odoev.tulobl.ru/

Odoyevsky District (Russian: Одо́евский райо́н) is an administrative district (raion), one of the twenty-three in Tula Oblast, Russia. Within the framework of municipal divisions, it is incorporated as Odoyevsky Municipal District. It is located in the west of the oblast. The area of the district is 1,182 square kilometers (456 sq mi). Its administrative center is the urban locality (a work settlement) of Odoyev. The population at the 2010 census was 13,184 14,149 (2002 census); 15,312 (1989 Soviet census). The population of Odoyev accounts for 46.6% of the district's total population.

== Culture ==
A well-known craft in the district is the ceramic pottery Filimonovo toys produced in the village of Filimonovo.

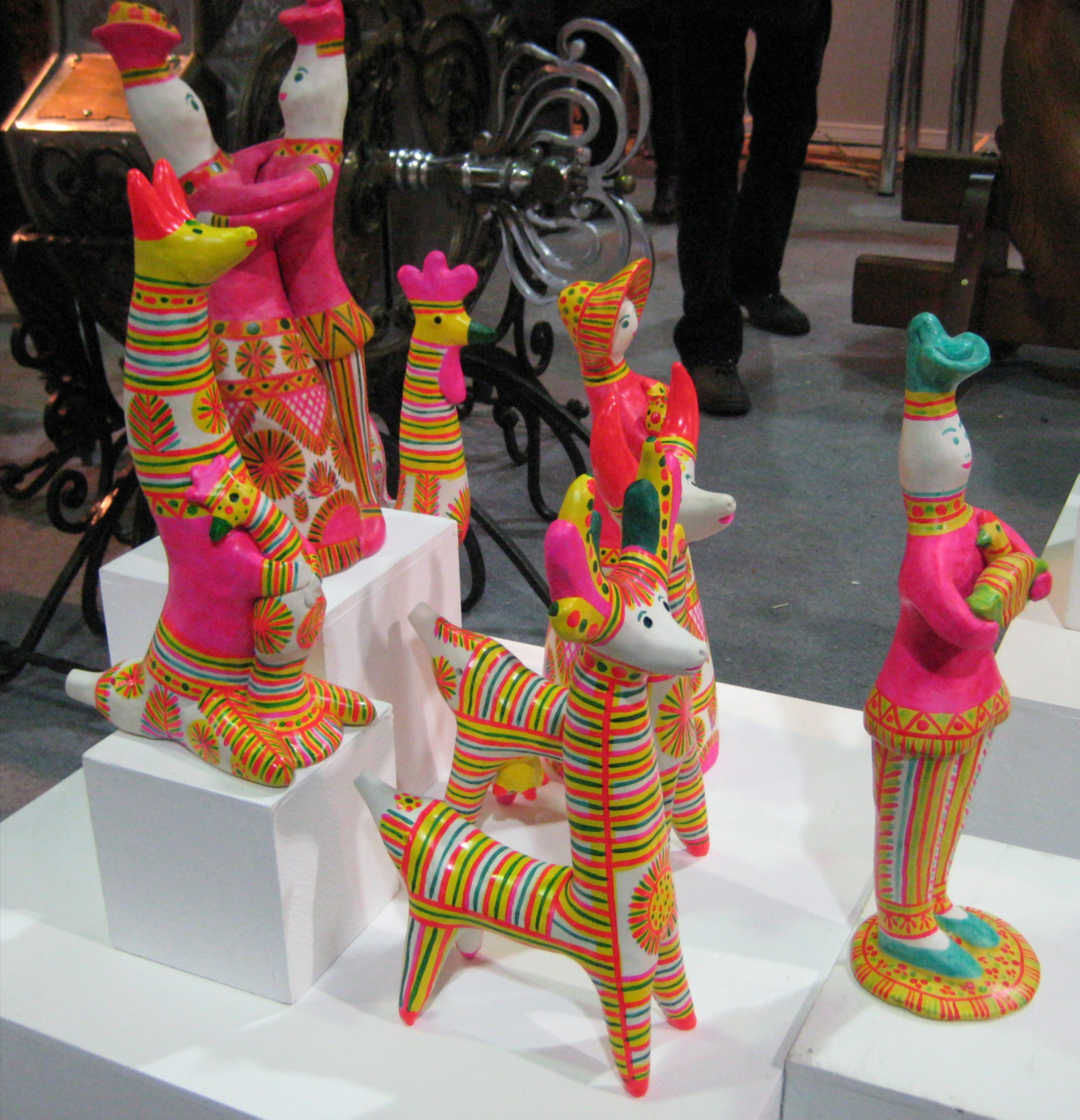
Filimonovo toys
