= Tales of the Alhambra (film) =

- Spanish: Cuentos de la Alhambra
- Directed by: Florián Rey
- Written by: Fernando Alarcón; Florián Rey
- Based on: Tales of the Alhambra by Washington Irving
- Produced by: Vicente Sempere
- Starring: Carmen Sevilla; Aníbal Vela; Manuel Arbó; José Isbert
- Cinematography: Heinrich Gärtner
- Edited by: Félix Suárez Inclán
- Music by: Jesús García Leoz
- Production company: Peninsular Films
- Distributed by: Peninsular Films
- Release date: August 24, 1950
- Running time: 103 minutes
- Country: Spain
- Language: Spanish

Tales of the Alhambra (Spanish: Cuentos de la Alhambra) is a 1950 Spanish comedy film directed by Florián Rey and starring Carmen Sevilla, Aníbal Vela and Manuel Arbó. The film is an adaptation of Washington Irving's 1832 short stories of the same title.

== Plot ==
American writer Washington Inving travels to La Alhambra de Granada, visiting its moorish buildings and getting inspiration from the people he meets : Mariquilla the gipsy, the soldier in love with her, bandoleers and local politicians.

== Cast ==
In alphabetical order

- Manuel Aguilera
- Julio F. Alymán
- Manuel Arbó as Ventero
- Mario Berriatúa as Lucas
- Raúl Cancio as Lieutenant
- Francisco Cano
- José Guardiola
- Manuel Guitián
- Casimiro Hurtado as Tío Pichón
- José Isbert as Don Cosme - the scribe
- José María Martín
- Mari Carmen Obregón
- Nicolás D. Perchicot as governor
- Santiago Rivero
- Rosario Royo as Paquita
- Carmen Sevilla as Mariquilla
- Carmen Sánchez as Doña Tula
- Luis Torrecilla
- Aníbal Vela as Washington Irving
- Juan Vázquez as Corregidor
- Roberto Zara as Varguitas
