= Dymkovo toys =

Traditional Russian folk handicraft

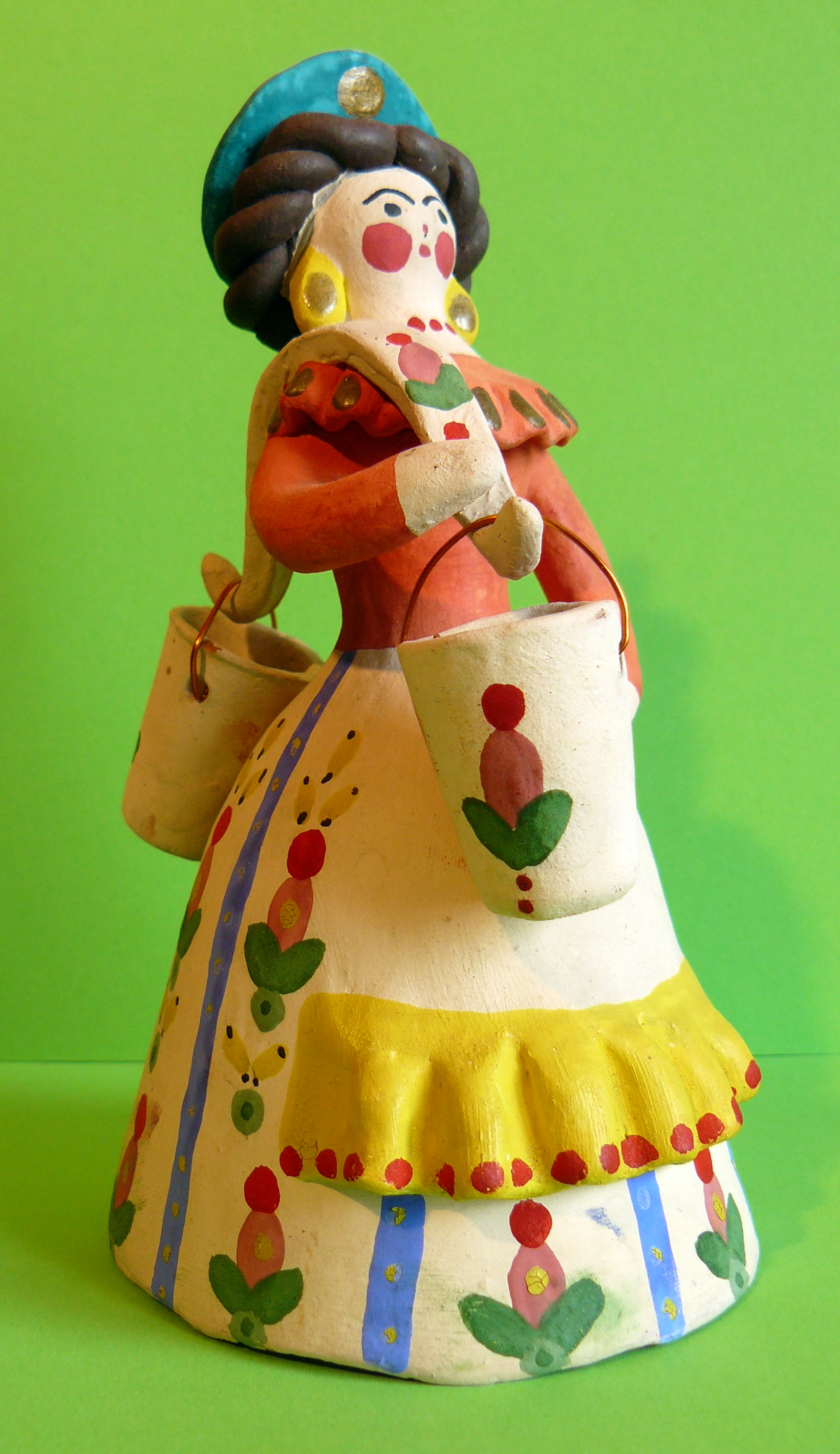
A Dymkovo toy

Dymkovo toys, also known as the Vyatka toys or Kirov toys (Дымковская игрушка, вятская игрушка, кировская игрушка in Russian) are moulded painted clay figures of people and animals (sometimes in the form of a pennywhistle). It is one of the old Russian folk art handicrafts, which still exists in the village of Dymkovo near Kirov (formerly Vyatka). Traditionally, Dymkovo toys are made by women.

The tradition of making pennywhistles in the form of a horse, a horse rider, and a bird goes back to the ancient magic ritual images and has to do with the agricultural calendar holidays. Later, the little figures lost their magic meaning and turned into toys for children, the making of which would become an artistic handicraft. Up until the 20th century, this toy production had been timed to the spring fair called свистунья, or whistler. The first recorded mentioning of this event took place in 1811, but it is believed to have existed for some 400 years, thus dating the history of the Dymkovo toy at least from the 17th century.

In the late 19th century the handicraft fell into decline because the Dymkovo toys had been forced out of the market by the factory-made moulded plaster statuettes, which imitated porcelain articles. During Soviet times, however, the Dymkovo handicraft was revived. In 1933, they organized an artel called Вятская игрушка (The Vyatka Toy), which would turn into a workshop of the Artistic Fund of the RSFSR (Russian: Художественный фонд РСФСР). These days, the Dymkovo toys are known as a popular Russian souvenir.

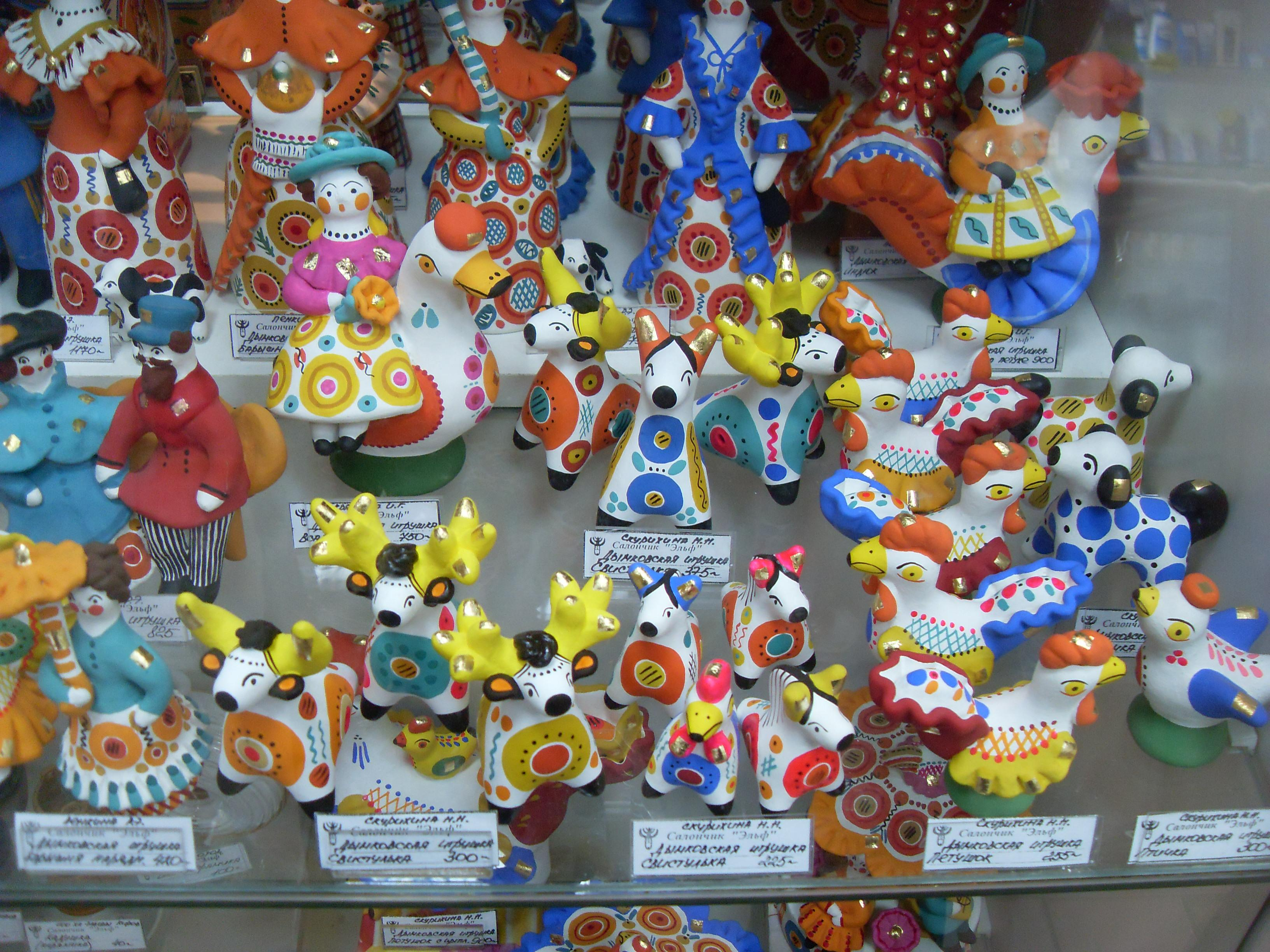
Dymkovo toys

The Dymkovo toys are moulded from a mixture of local potter's clay and river sand. The parts are then fastened together with watery clay. After the toys are dried and tempered in a furnace, they are whitewashed with chalk diluted in milk, then painted with tempera (before 1953, the artists used aniline paints ground with eggs) in 4 to 10 (or more) colors, and decorated with gold leaf.

Modern Dymkovo toys include ancient motifs, as well as those of the second half of the 19th century, such as барыни (barynyas, or landladies), няньки (nyanki, or nannies), водоноски (vodonoski, or female watercarriers) and others. In the 1930s, the Dymkovo toys began to depict fairy tales and a contemporary lifestyle. There were also multi-character compositions on stands, and figures of people taller than 30 cm.

Massive, abstract, and somewhat grotesque forms of the Dymkovo toys are emphasized by ruffles, puffed collars, and other features. The improvised bright painting of the toys represents a geometric ornament of circles, checks, and dots of different colors and sizes.

== See also ==
- Filimonovo toy
