= Villa Zorayda =

Historic house in Florida, United States

- U.S. National Register of Historic Places
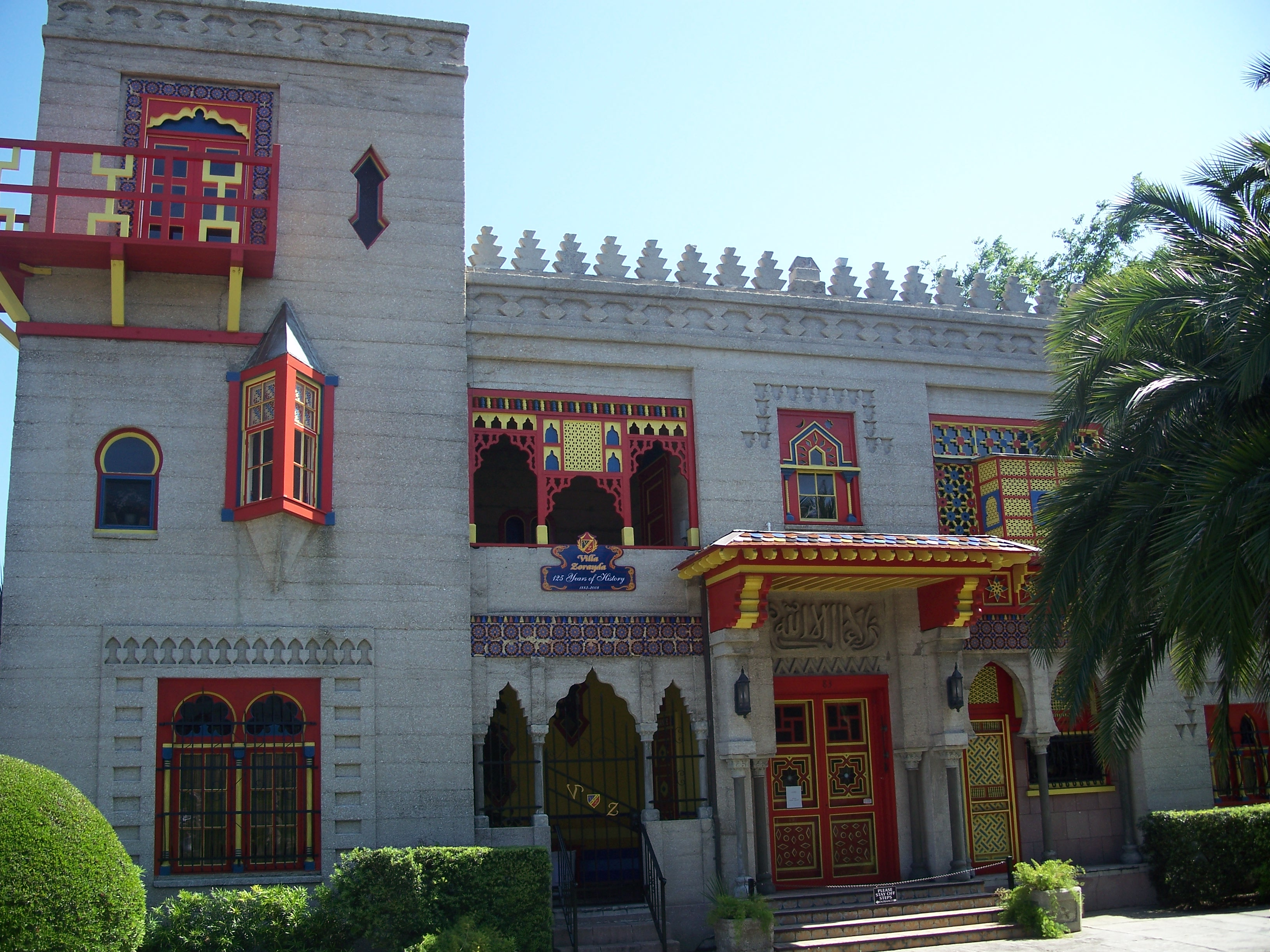

- Location within Florida Location within the United States
- Location: St. Augustine, Florida
- Coordinates: 29°53′30″N 81°18′54.5″W
- Architect: Franklin W. Smith
- Architectural style: Moorish Revival
- NRHP reference No.: 93001002
- Added to NRHP: September 23, 1993

Commemorative plaque

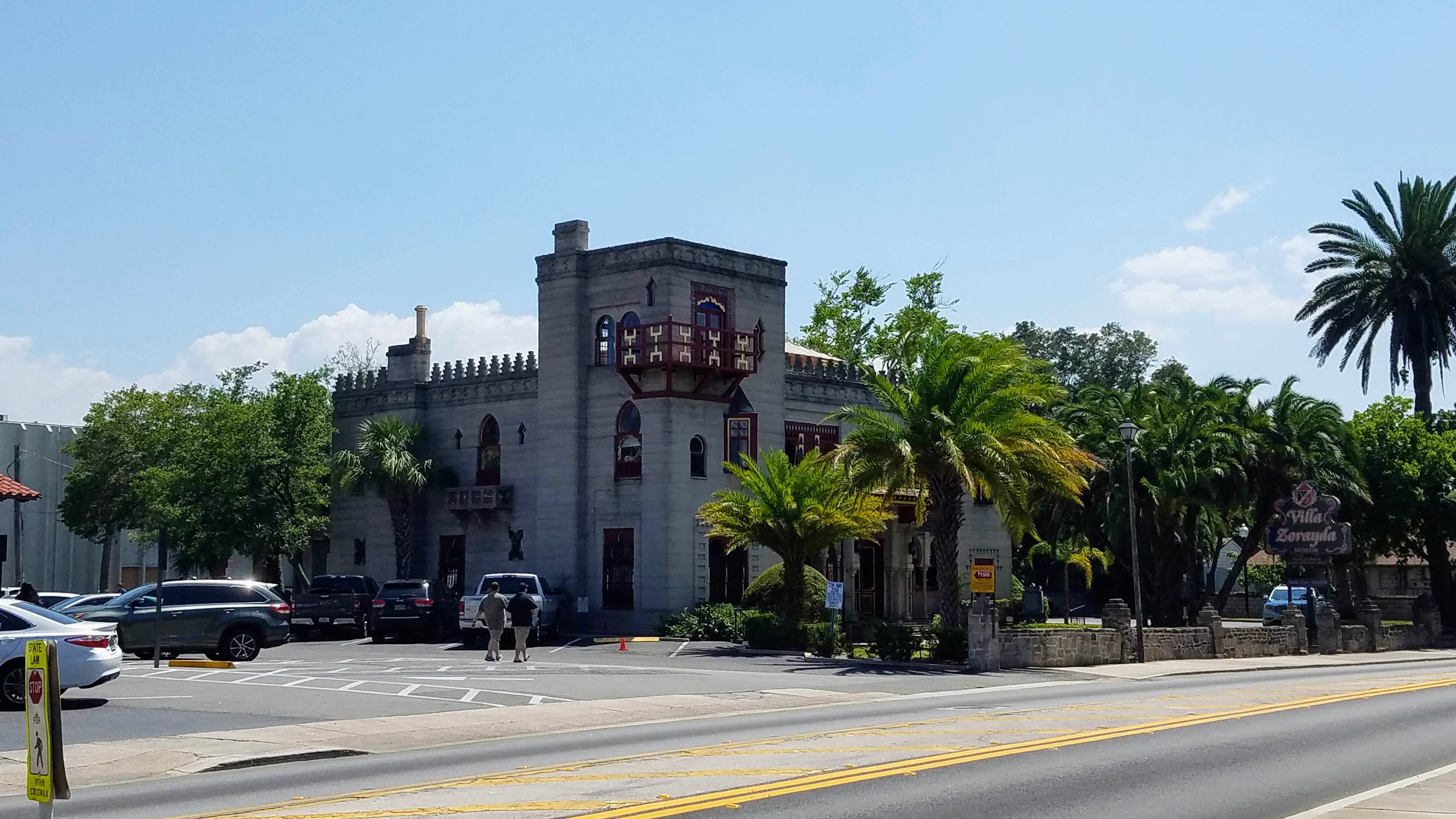
May 2019

Villa Zorayda (also known as the Zorayda Castle) is a house at 83 King Street in St. Augustine, Florida. Built in 1883 by the eccentric Boston millionaire Franklin W. Smith as his winter home, it was inspired by the 12th-century Moorish Alhambra Palace in Granada, Spain. Smith named it "Villa Zorayda", after one of the princesses in Washington Irving's Tales of the Alhambra. The building and part of Franklin Smith's art and antique collection were sold to Abraham Mussallem, a rug and antiquities merchant originally from Syria, in 1913. On September 23, 1993, it was added to the U.S. National Register of Historic Places. The Villa Zorayda Museum is still owned by the Mussallem family and contains the original art and antique collection assembled by Franklin Smith and Abraham Mussallem.

== History ==
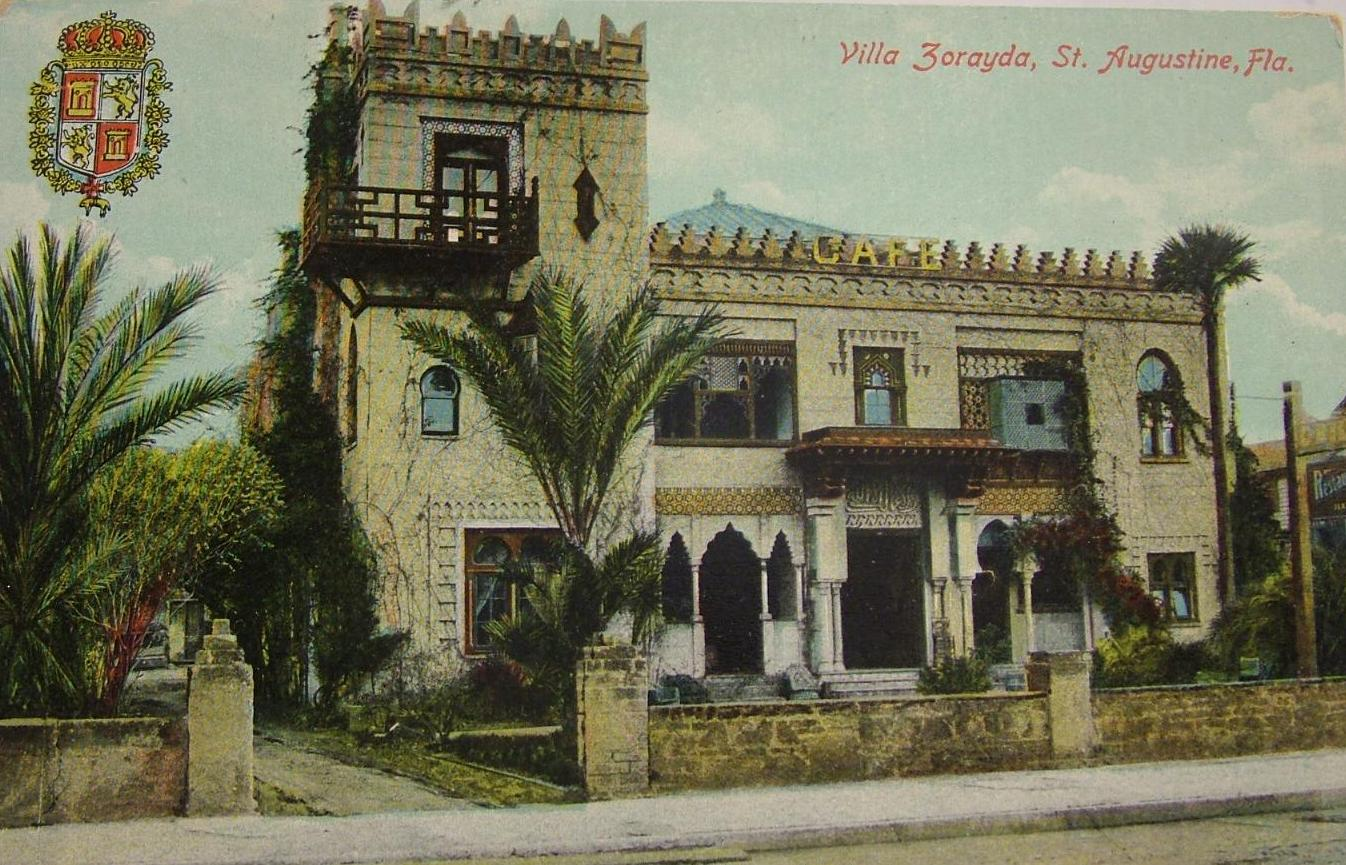
The Villa Zorayda in the early 1900s

Franklin W. Smith was an amateur architect and pioneer experimenter in poured concrete construction. His winter home, Villa Zorayda, was the first residence built in the Moorish Revival style in Florida, and the first poured concrete building in St. Augustine. Smith's concrete mix, which used crushed coquina shells as an aggregate, and his method of pouring it in successive levels, was adopted by Henry Morrison Flagler, a Standard Oil partner and Florida developer, for his nearby hotels and churches on an even grander scale. Villa Zorayda could also be considered the first example of fantasy architecture in Florida.

Smith was an early member of the Republican Party, and danced with his wife at Abraham Lincoln's inaugural ball in 1861. He was also a founder of the Boston YMCA, and was involved in many reform efforts and schemes for public improvement in the course of his long life. He is buried in the Mount Auburn Cemetery in Cambridge, Massachusetts. One block east of Villa Zorayda is the largest building Smith constructed in St. Augustine, the Casa Monica Hotel (later purchased by Henry Flagler and renamed the Cordova Hotel).

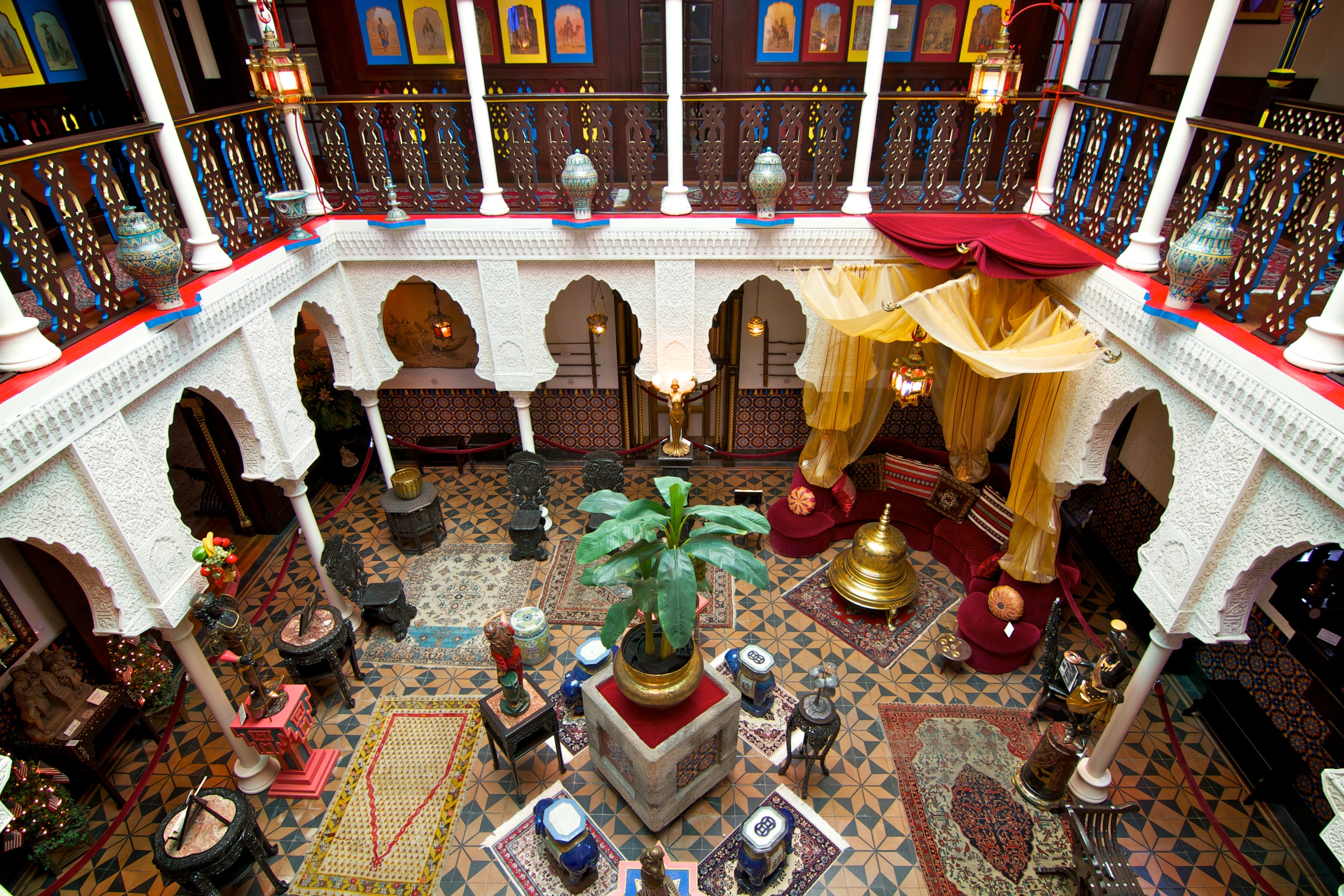
The Villa Zorayda Museum's "Court of Lions"

In addition to its intended purpose as a private residence, the Villa Zorayda has been used as a restaurant, a nightclub and gambling casino, and a hotel. The building underwent renovations beginning in 2003 and reopened to the public in 2008. Audio tours are available in English, Spanish, and French. Audio tours provide an extensive overview of the history of the building, the building's role in St. Augustine's history, and the entire antique and art collection inside. The museum is open daily

== The collection ==
The Villa Zorayda Museum contains intricate interior details, including most notably work in cast plaster with ground alabaster matching that of the Alhambra Palace in Granada, Spain. These alabaster and plaster reliefs are referred to as traceries or arabesques and are replicas of walls in the Alhambra Palace. The saying, "There is no conqueror but God", the same phrase reproduced in the tracery of the Alhambra, is inscribed in Arabic script above the front entrance. The architecture of the building is accompanied by fine detail including hand painted wood panels and tiles, intricately designed fireplaces and doorways, and geometrically shaped windows and stained glass. The collection also includes hand-pierced brass lamps from Damascus and other parts of the Middle East, Oriental rugs, sculptures, carved furniture, decorative tiles, and Egyptian artifacts.
