= The Tale of the Golden Cockerel =

1835 fairy tale poem by Pushkin

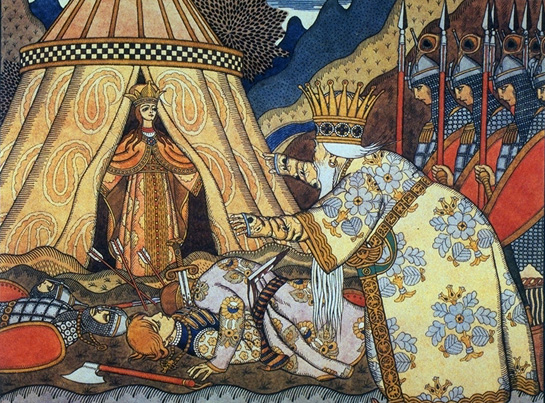
Tsar Dadon meets the Shemakha queen. Illustration by Ivan Bilibin, 1907

The Tale of the Golden Cockerel (Russian: Сказка о золотом петушке, romanized: Skazka o zolotom petushke) is the last fairy tale in verse by Alexander Pushkin. Pushkin wrote the tale in 1834 and it was first published in literary magazine Biblioteka dlya chteniya (Library for Reading) in 1835. While not officially based on any specific fairy tale, a number of similar stories were later revealed by scholars, most famously by Anna Akhmatova in her 1933 essay "Pushkin's Last Fairy Tale". Among the influences named were the Legend of the Arabian Astrologer from Tales of the Alhambra by Washington Irving, Der goldene Hahn (1785) by Friedrich Maximilian Klinger and Kaib (1792) by Ivan Krylov. In turn, all of them borrowed from the ancient Coptic legend first translated by the French Arabist Pierre Vattier in 1666 using the 1584 manuscript from the collection of Cardinal Mazarin.

== Adaptations ==
- 1907 – The Golden Cockerel, opera by Nikolai Rimsky-Korsakov
- 1967 – The Golden Cockerel, USSR, production of a film studio Soyuzmultfilm, popular animated film by Alexandra Snezhko-Blotskaya
