= The Golden Cockerel =

Opera by Nikolai Rimsky-Korsakov

- Opera by Nikolai Rimsky-Korsakov
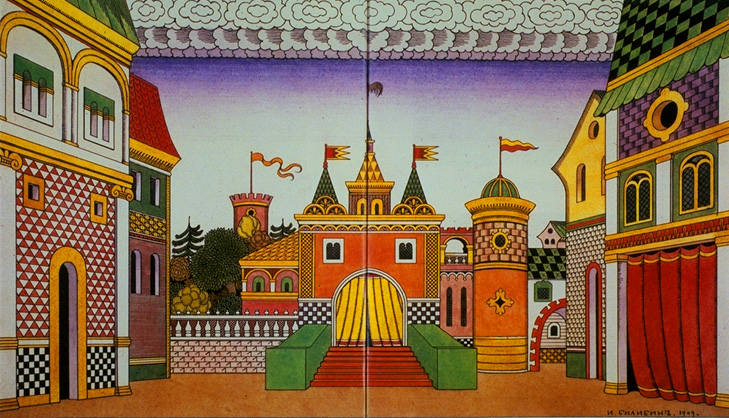
- Ivan Bilibin's 1909 stage set design for Act 2: The Tsardom of Tsar Dodon, Town Square
- Native title: Zolotoy petushok (Золотой петушок)
- Other title: Le coq d'or
- Librettist: Vladimir Belsky
- Language: Russian; French
- Based on: Pushkin's "The Tale of the Golden Cockerel" (1834)
- Premiere: 7 October 1909; Solodovnikov Theatre, Moscow, Russia

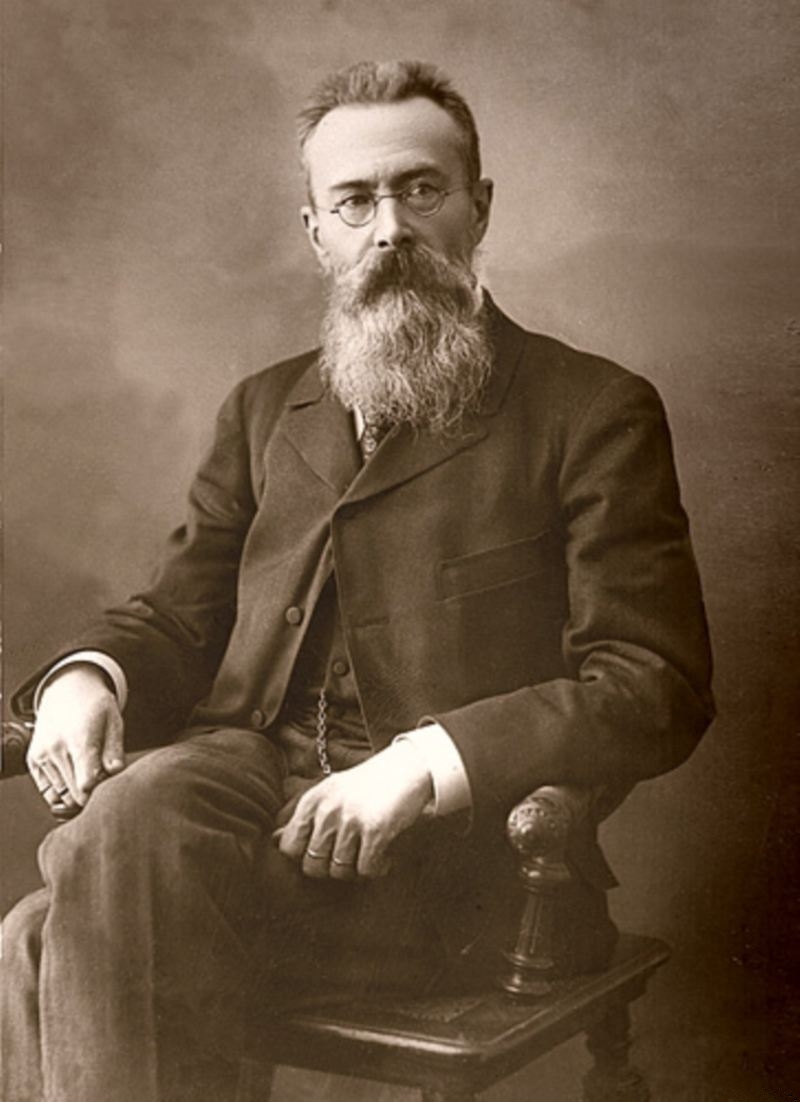
Nikolai Rimsky-Korsakov in 1897

The Golden Cockerel (Russian: Золотой петушок, romanized: Zolotoy petushok) is an opera in three acts, with a short prologue and an even shorter epilogue, composed by Nikolai Rimsky-Korsakov, his last complete opera, before his death in 1908. Its libretto written by Vladimir Belsky, is derived from Alexander Pushkin's 1834 poem, The Tale of the Golden Cockerel. The opera was completed in 1907 and premiered in 1909, in Moscow, after the composer's death. Apart from Russia, it has often been performed in French, as Le Coq d'or.

== Composition history ==
Nikolai Rimsky-Korsakov had considered his previous opera, The Legend of the Invisible City of Kitezh and the Maiden Fevroniya (1907) to be his final artistic statement in the medium, and, indeed, this work has been called a "summation of the nationalistic operatic tradition of Glinka and The Five". However, the political situation in Russia at the time inspired him to take up the pen to compose a "razor-sharp satire of the autocracy, of Russian imperialism, and of the Russo-Japanese war." Also, Rimsky-Korsakov's previous works inspired by Alexander Pushkin's poems, especially Tsar Saltan (1899-1900), had proven to be very successful.

The work on The Golden Cockerel began in 1906 and finished by September 1907. By the end of February 1908, the director of Imperial Theatres, Vladimir Telyakovskiy passed the score to the censorship agency in order to get approval for the Bolshoi Theatre. It was returned unedited, yet was suddenly taken back the next day. This time many changes were requested to be made to the libretto as well as the original Pushkin's text. Rimsky-Korsakov suspected someone's denunciation and resisted any changes. He continued the work on orchestration while fighting with progressive illness. In June 1908, Telyakovskiy informed him that the Moscow Governor-General Sergei Gershelman was highly against the opera. In his last letter Rimsky-Korsakov asked his friend and music publisher Boris Jurgenson to contact Michel-Dimitri Calvocoressi and suggest to him to stage The Golden Cockerel in Paris. He died two days later and thus never witnessed the premiere of his last opera.

== Performance history ==
The premiere took place on 7 October (O.S. 24 September) 1909, at Moscow's Solodovnikov Theatre in a performance by the Zimin Opera. Emil Cooper conducted; set designs were by Ivan Bilibin. The opera was given at the city's Bolshoi Theatre a month later, on 6 November, conducted by Vyacheslav Suk and with set designs by Konstantin Korovin. London and Paris premieres occurred in 1914; in Paris it was staged at the Palais Garnier, in London at the Theatre Royal Drury Lane by the Ballets Russes as an opera-ballet, choreographed and directed by Michel Fokine with set and costume designs by Natalia Goncharova. The United States premiere took place at the Metropolitan Opera House on 6 March 1918, with Marie Sundelius in the title role, Adamo Didur and Maria Barrientos in the actual leads, and Pierre Monteux conducting.

The Met performed the work regularly through 1945. All Met performances before World War II were sung in French; during the work's final season in the Met repertory, the Golden Cockerel was sung in English. The English translators were Antal Doráti and James Gibson. The work has not been performed at the Met since the war, but it was staged at neighboring New York City Opera from 1967 to 1971, always in English, with Beverly Sills singing the Tsaritsa of Shemakha opposite Norman Treigle's Dodon, and Julius Rudel conducting Tito Capobianco's production.

At Covent Garden in London the opera was seen in January 1954, in a production by Robert Helpmann conducted by Igor Markevitch (making his Covent Garden debut); the cast included Hugues Cuénod as the astrologer, Howell Glynne as Dodon, and Mattiwilda Dobbs as the Queen of Shemakhan. In 1998, the Royal Opera company presented a new production at Sadler's Wells Theatre produced by Tim Hopkins and conducted by Vladimir Jurowski with Jean-Paul Fouchécourt as the astrologer, Paata Burchuladze as Dodon and Elena Kelessidi as the Queen.

On 13 December 1975, the BBC broadcast a live performance in English from the Theatre Royal Glasgow of a production by David Pountney with the BBC Scottish Symphony Orchestra under Alexander Gibson, and with Don Garrard as Tsar Dodon, John Angelo Messana as the Astrologer and Catherine Gayer as the Tsaritsa.

The Mariinsky Theatre staged a new production of The Golden Cockerel on 25 December 2014, with Valery Gergiev as conductor. The stage director and costume designer was Anna Matison. The opera was presented in Russian during the 2015 winter season by the Sarasota Opera conducted by Ekhart Wycik, with set designs by David P. Gordon, and featuring Grigory Soloviov as Tsar Dodon, Alexandra Batsios as the Tsaritsa of Shemakha, Timur Bekbosunov as the Astrologer, and Riley Svatos as the Golden Cockerel.

De Munt/La Monnaie staged a new production in Brussels in December 2016. This was a co-production with the Teatro Real of Madrid and Opera National de Lorraine (Nancy). The stage director and costume designer was Laurent Pelly; the conductor, Alain Altinoglu. The role of Tsar Dodon was shared between Pavol Hunka and Alexey Tikhomirov; the Tsarina was shared between Venera Gimadieva and Nina Minasyan. Alexander Kravets took the role of Astrologer and the singing role of the Cockerel was played by Sheva Tehoval with Sarah Demarthe as the on-stage Cockerel.

== Instrumentation ==
- Woodwinds: 1 Piccolo, 2 Flutes, 2 Oboes, 1 Cor anglais, 2 Clarinets (in A-B), 1 Bass clarinet (in A-B), 2 Bassoons, 1 Contrabassoon ;
- Brass: 4 French horns (in F), 2 Trumpets (in C), 1 Trumpet contralto (in F), 3 Trombones, 1 Tuba ;
- Percussion: Timpani, Triangle, Snare drum, Tambourine, Glockenspiel, Cymbals, Bass drum, Xylophone, Tam-tam ;
- Other: Celesta, 2 Harps ;
- Strings: Violins, Violas, Cellos, Double basses.

== Roles ==
Roles	Voice type	Performance cast Zimin Opera 24 September 1909 (Conductor: Emil Cooper)	Performance cast Bolshoi Theatre 6 November 1909 (Conductor: Vyacheslav Suk)
Tsar Dodon (Царь Додон)	bass	Nikolay Speransky	Vasily Osipov
Tsarevich Gvidon (Царевич Гвидон)	tenor	Fyodor Ernst	Semyon Gardenin
Tsarevich Afron (Царевич Афрон)	baritone	Andrey Dikov	Nikolay Chistyakov
General Polkan	bass	Kapiton Zaporozhets	Khristofor Tolkachyov
Amelfa, a housekeeper	contralto	Aleksandra Rostovtseva	Serafima Sinitsina
Astrologer	tenor altino	Vladimir Pikok	Anton Bonachich
Tsaritsa of Shemakha (Шемаханская царица)	coloratura soprano	Avreliya-Tsetsiliya Dobrovolskaya	Antonina Nezhdanova
Golden Cockerel (Золотой петушок)	soprano	Vera Klopotovskaya	Yevgeniya Popello-Davydova
chorus, silent roles

Note on names:

- Pushkin spelled Dodon's name as Dadon. The association of the revised spelling Dodon in the libretto with the dodo bird is likely intentional.
- Shemakha is a noun, denoting a place. Shemakhan is an adjectival usage.

== Synopsis ==
Time: Unspecified
Place: In the thrice-tenth tsardom, a far off place (beyond thrice-nine lands) in Russian folklore

Note: There is an actual city of Shemakha (also spelled "Şamaxı", "Schemacha" and "Shamakhy"), which is the capital of the Shamakhi Rayon of Azerbaijan. In Pushkin's day it was an important city and the capital of what was to become the Baku Governorate. But the realm of that name, ruled by its tsaritsa, bears little resemblance to today's Shemakha and region.

=== Prologue ===
After a quotation by the orchestra of the most important leitmotifs, a mysterious Astrologer comes before the curtain and announces to the audience that, although they are going to see and hear a fictional tale from long ago, his story will have a valid and true moral.

=== Act 1 ===
The bumbling Tsar Dodon talks himself into believing that his country is in danger from a neighbouring state, Shemakha, ruled by a beautiful Tsaritsa. He requests advice from the Astrologer, who supplies a magic Golden Cockerel to safeguard the Tsar's interests. When the little cockerel confirms that the Tsaritsa of Shemakha does harbor territorial ambitions, Dodon decides to preemptively strike Shemakha, sending his army to battle under the command of his two sons.

=== Act 2 ===
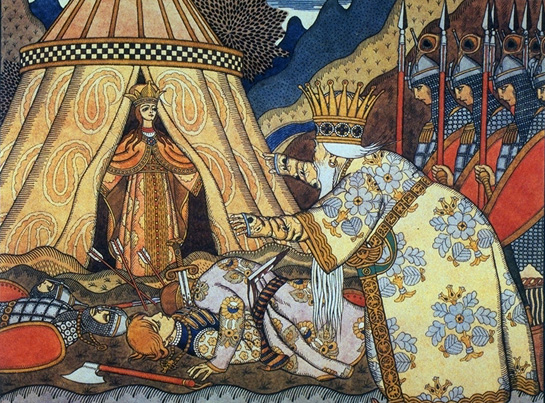
Tsar Dodon (Dadon) meets the Shemakha queen, illustration by Ivan Bilibin, 1907.

However, his sons are both so inept that they manage to kill each other on the battlefield. Tsar Dodon then decides to lead the army himself, but further bloodshed is averted because the Golden Cockerel ensures that the old Tsar becomes besotted when he actually sees the beautiful Tsaritsa. The Tsaritsa herself encourages this situation by performing a seductive dance – which tempts the Tsar to try and partner with her, but he is clumsy and makes a complete mess of it. The Tsaritsa realises that she can take over Dodon's country without further fighting – she engineers a marriage proposal from Dodon, which she coyly accepts.

=== Act 3 ===
The Final Scene starts with the wedding procession in all its splendour. As this reaches its conclusion, the Astrologer appears and says to Dodon, "You promised me anything I could ask for if there could be a happy resolution of your troubles ..." "Yes, yes", replies the Tsar, "just name it and you shall have it". "Right", says the Astrologer, "I want the Tsaritsa of Shemakha!" At this, the Tsar flares up in fury and strikes down the Astrologer with a blow from his mace. The Golden Cockerel, loyal to his Astrologer master, then swoops across and pecks through the Tsar's jugular. The sky darkens. When light returns, the Tsaritsa and the little cockerel are gone.

=== Epilogue ===
The Astrologer comes again before the curtain and announces the end of his story, reminding the public that what they just saw was "merely illusion", that only he and the Tsaritsa were mortals and real.

== Principal arias and numbers ==
Act 1
Introduction: "I Am a Sorcerer" «Я колдун» (orchestra, Astrologer)
Lullaby (orchestra, guards, Amelfa)

Act 2
Aria: "Hymn to the Sun" «Ответь мне, зоркое светило» (Tsaritsa of Shemakha)
Dance (Tsaritsa of Shemakha, orchestra)
Chorus (slaves)

Act 3
Scene: "Wedding Procession" «Свадебное шествие» (Amelfa, people)

== Analysis ==
Preface to The Golden Cockerel by librettist V. Belsky (1907)

The purely human character of Pushkin's story, The Golden Cockerel – a tragi-comedy showing the fatal results of human passion and weakness – allows us to place the plot in any surroundings and in any period. On these points the author does not commit himself, but indicates vaguely in the manner of fairy-tales: "In a certain far-off tsardom", "in a country set on the borders of the world"... Nevertheless, the name Dodon and certain details and expressions used in the story prove the poet's desire to give his work the air of a popular Russian fairy tale (like Tsar Saltan), and similar to those fables expounding the deeds of Prince Bova, of Jerouslan Lazarevitch or Erhsa Stchetinnik, fantastical pictures of national habit and costumes. Therefore, in spite of Oriental traces and the Italian names Duodo and Guidone, the tale is intended to depict, historically, the simple manners and daily life of the Russian people, painted in primitive colours with all the freedom and extravagance beloved of artists.

In producing the opera the greatest attention must be paid to every scenic detail, so as not to spoil the special character of the work. The following remark is equally important. In spite of its apparent simplicity, the purpose of The Golden Cockerel is undoubtedly symbolic.

This is not to be gathered so much from the famous couplet: "Tho' a fable, I admit, moral can be drawn to fit!" which emphasises the general message of the story, as from the way in which Pushkin has shrouded in mystery the relationship between his two fantastical characters: The Astrologer and the Tsaritsa.

Did they hatch a plot against Dodon? Did they meet by accident, both intent on the tsar's downfall? The author does not tell us, and yet this is a question to be solved in order to determine the interpretation of the work. The principal charm of the story lies in so much being left to the imagination, but, in order to render the plot somewhat clearer, a few words as to the action on the stage may not come amiss.

Many centuries ago, a wizard, still alive today, sought by his magic cunning to overcome the daughter of the Aerial Powers. Failing in his project, he tried to win her through the person of Tsar Dodon. He is unsuccessful and to console himself, he presents to the audience, in his magic lantern the story of heartless royal ingratitude.

== Performance practice ==
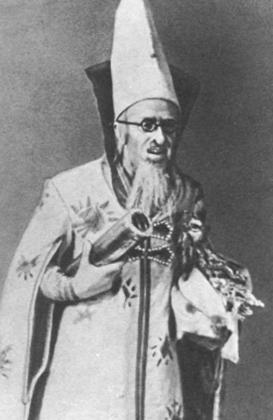
Vladimir Pikok sang the role of the Astrologer in the premiere of the opera. The difficult role is written for a tenor altino, as the Astrologer is a eunuch (Solodovnikov Theatre, Moscow, 1909).

Composer's performance remarks (1907)

1. The composer does not sanction any "cuts."
2. Operatic singers are in the habit of introducing interjections, spoken words, etc. into the music, hoping thereby to produce dramatic, comic or realistic effect. Far from adding significance to the music, these additions and emendations merely disfigure it. The composer desires that the singers in all his works keep strictly to the music written for them.
3. Metronome marks must be followed accurately. This does not imply that artists should sing like clock-work; they are given full artistic scope, but they must keep within bounds.
4. The composer feels it necessary to reiterate the following remark in lyrical passages: those actors who are on the stage, but not singing at the moment, must refrain from drawing the attention of the spectators to themselves by unnecessary by-play. An opera is first and foremost a musical work.
5. The part of the Astrologer is written for a voice seldom met with, that of tenor altino. It may however be entrusted to a lyric tenor possessing a strong falsetto, for the part is written in the extremely high register.
6. The Golden Cockerel demands a strong soprano or high mezzo-soprano voice.
7. The dances performed by the Tsar and Tsaritsa in the second act must be carried out so as not to interfere with the singers' breathing by too sudden or too violent movement.

Staging practices Early stagings became influential by stressing the modernist elements inherent in the opera. Diaghilev's 1914 Paris production had the singers sitting offstage, while dancers provided the stage action. Though some in Russia disapproved of Diaghilev's interpretation, and Rimsky-Korsakov's widow threatened to sue, the production was considered a milestone. Stravinsky was to expand on this idea in the staging of his own Renard (1917) and Les Noces (1923), in which the singers are unseen, and mimes or dancers perform on stage.

== Derived works ==
Rimsky-Korsakov made the following concert arrangement:

- Introduction and Wedding Procession from the opera The Golden Cockerel (1907)

Введение и свадебное шествие из оперы «Золотой петушок»

After his death, A. Glazunov and M. Shteynberg (Steinberg) compiled the following orchestral suite:

- Four Musical Pictures from the Opera The Golden Cockerel

Четыре музыкальных картины из оперы «Золотой петушок»

1. Tsar Dodon at home (Царь Додон у себя дома)
2. Tsar Dodon on the march (Царь Додон в походе)
3. Tsar Dodon with the Shemakhan Tsaritsa (Царь Додон у Шемаханской царицы)
4. The wedding and the lamentable end of Dodon (Свадьба и печальный конец Додона)

Efrem Zimbalist wrote Concert Phantasy on 'Le coq d'or' for violin and piano based on themes from the suite.

== Inspiration for other works ==
Marina Frolova-Walker points to The Golden Cockerel as the fore-runner of the anti-psychologistic and absurdist ideas which would culminate in such 20th century 'anti-operas' as Prokofiev's The Love for Three Oranges (1921) and Shostakovich's The Nose (1930). In this, his last opera, Rimsky-Korsakov had laid "the foundation for modernist opera in Russia and beyond."

In 1978-1979 the English composer Kaikhosru Shapurji Sorabji wrote "Il gallo d’oro" da Rimsky-Korsakov: variazioni frivole con una fuga anarchica, eretica e perversa.

== Recordings ==
Audio Recordings (Mainly studio recordings, unless otherwise indicated)

Source: www.operadis-opera-discography.org.uk

- 1951, Aleksey Korolev (Tsar Dodon), Pavel Tchekin (Tsarevich Gvidon), Levon Khachaturov (Tsarevich Afron), Sergey Krassovsky (General Polkan), Antonina Kleshcheva (Amelfa), Pavel Pontryagin (Astrologer), Nadezhda Kazantseva (Shemakhan Tsaritsa), Lina Shukhat (Golden Cockerel). The Great symphony orchestra of All-Union Radio and The Great choir of All-Union Radio. Choirmaster: Ivan Kuvykin. Alexander Gauk (conductor). This recording was discovered and released for the first time in any format in 2011 by the Russian label Aquarius. It is now considered the best recording of this work.
- 1962, Aleksey Korolev (Tsar Dodon), Yuri Yelnikov (Tsarevich Gvidon), Aleksandr Polyakov (Tsarevich Afron), Leonid Ktitorov (General Polkan), Antonina Klescheva (Amelfa), Gennady Pishchayev (Astrologer), Klara Kadinskaya (Shemakhan Tsaritsa), Nina Polyakova (Golden Cockerel). Moscow Radio Orchestra and Chorus. ' Aleksey Kovalev & Yevgeny Akulov (conductor).
- 1971 (sung in English, live performance), Norman Treigle (Tsar Dodon), Beverly Sills (Tsaritsa Shemakha), Enrico di Giuseppe (Astrologer), Muriel Costa-Greenspon (Amelfa), Gary Glaze (Gvidon), David Rae Smith (Afron), Edward Pierson (Polkan), Syble Young (Le Coq d’or). Orchestra and Chorus of the New York City Opera. Julius Rudel
- 1985, Nikolai Stoilov (Tsar Dodon), Ljubomir Bodurov (Tsarevich Gvidon), Emil Ugrinov (Tsarevich Afron), Kosta Videv (General Polkan), Evgenia Babacheva (Amelfa), Lyubomir Diakovski (Astrologer), Elena Stoyanova (Shemakhan Tsaritsa), Yavora Stoilova (Golden Cockerel). Sofia National Opera Orchestra and Chorus, Dimiter Manolov.
- 1987, Evgeny Nesterenko (Tsar Dodon), Vyacheslav Voinarovsky (Tsarevich Gvidon), Vladimir Svistov (Tsarevich Afron), Alexei Mochalov (General Polkan), Raisa Kotova (Amelfa), Boris Tarkhov (Astrologer), Elena Ustinova (Shemakhan Tsaritsa), Olga Shalaeva (Golden Cockerel). Academic Symphony Orchestra of Moscow State Philharmonic and All-Union Radio and Television Academic Grand Choir, Dmitri Kitaenko.
- 1988, (live performance), Yevgeny Svetlanov (conductor), Bolshoy Theatre Orchestra and Chorus, Artur Eisen (Tsar Dodon), Arkady Mishenkin (Tsarevich Gvidon), Vladimir Redkin (Tsarevich Afron), Nikolay Nizinenko (General Polkan), Nina Gaponova (Amelfa), Oleg Biktimirov (Astrologer), Yelena Brilova (Shemakhan Tsaritsa), Irina Udalova (Golden Cockerel)

Notable excerpts

- 1910 Antonina Nezhdanova (Shemakhan Tsaritsa): Hymn to the Sun (in Russian). Available on LP, CD and online.

=== Videos ===
- 1986 Grigor Gondjian (Tsar Dodon), Ruben Kubelian (Tsarevich Gvidon), Sergey Shushardjian (Tsarevich Afron), Ellada Chakhoyan (Queen of Shemakha), Susanna Martirosian (Golden Cockerel), Haroutun Karadjian (General Polkan), Grand Aivazian (Astrologer). Alexander Spendiaryan State Academic Theatre Orchestra, Yerevan, Aram Katanian.
- 2002 Albert Schagidullin (Tsar Dodon), Olga Trifonova (Tsaritsa), Barry Banks (Astrologer) Orchestre de Paris, Kent Nagano
- 2016 Pavlo Hunka (Tsar Dodon), Venera Gimadieva (Queen of Shelmaka), Alexander Kravets (Astrologer), Chorus and Symphony Orchestra of La Monnaie, Brussels, Alain Altinoglu

== Sources ==
- Abraham, Gerald (1936). "XIV. – The Golden Cockerel". Studies in Russian Music. London: William Reeves / The New Temple Press. pp. 290–310.
- Holden, Amanda (Ed.), The New Penguin Opera Guide, New York: Penguin Putnam, 2001 ISBN 0-14-029312-4.
