= Dimiter Manolov =

Bulgarian conductor (1940–1998)

Dimiter Manolov (Bulgarian: Димитър Манолов; 20 July 1940 – 25 September 1998) was a Bulgarian conductor. His career included work with the Ruse Opera, the Pleven Philharmonic, the Sofia Philharmonic Orchestra, the Sofia Opera, the Plovdiv Philharmonic and orchestras in Colombia.

== Biography ==
Manolov studied at the Bulgarian State Conservatory and in 1962 continued his conducting studies at the Moscow Conservatory with Gennady Rozhdestvensky. After returning to Bulgaria in 1966, he worked at the Ruse Opera and later spent three years with the Pleven Philharmonic. In 1972 he joined the Sofia Philharmonic, where he worked for nine seasons.

In 1981 Manolov moved to Colombia to conduct the Bogotá Philharmonic Orchestra. His period with the orchestra included Brahms and Beethoven symphony cycles at the Auditorio León de Greiff in Bogotá. He served as one of the Bogotá Philharmonic's principal conductors.

He returned to Bulgaria in the mid-1980s and worked as chief conductor of the Sofia Opera. He later led the Plovdiv Philharmonic and taught at the National Academy of Music in Sofia.

In 1991 Manolov returned to Colombia. In 1994, Colcultura appointed him titular conductor of the Orquesta Sinfónica de Colombia; at the time he was conducting the Sinfónica del Valle. He died in Bogotá on 25 September 1998.

== Discography ==
- Rimsky-Korsakov: The Golden Cockerel, Sofia National Opera Chorus and Orchestra, Capriccio, 1996.
