= Filimonovo toy =

Ceramic Russian folk art toys

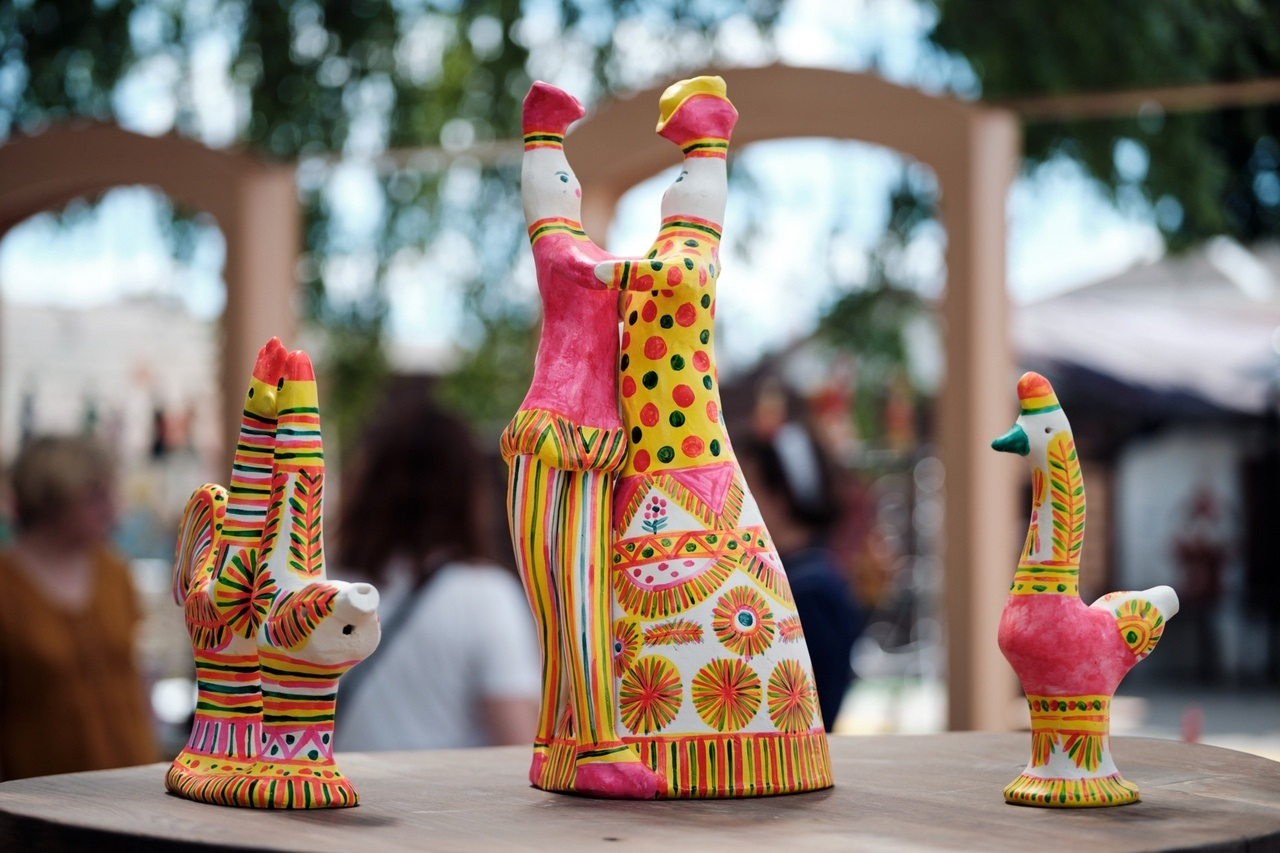
Brightly coloured Filimonov ceramic toys

Filimonovo toys (Russian: Филимо́новская игру́шка) are a type of Russian pottery craft produced in Odoyevsky District of Tula Oblast, Russia. The toys derive their name from the village of its origin, Filimonovo, and are moulded by hand from the bluish-grey local clay that fires into a pure white ceramic. The artists paint the figures with aniline dyes with motifs of brightly colored strips and spots.

Filimonovo toys are often clay whistles in the forms of women, horsemen, and assorted animals such as bears, cattle, and roosters. Figurine motifs of people or other animals holding chickens or roosters is also quite common.
