= Malyshev (surname) =

Malyshev (masculine) or Malysheva (feminine) is a Russian surname. It may refer to:

- Aleksandr Malyshev (born 1980), Russian professional football coach and a former player
- Anton Malyshev (born 1985), Russian ice hockey player
- Ilya Malyshev (1904–1973), Soviet geologist
- Mikhail Malyshev (1965–2025), Russian murderer, cannibal and serial killer
- Misha Malyshev, Russian physicist
- Natalia Malysheva (born 1994), Russian amateur wrestler
- Pyotr Malyshev (1898–1972), Soviet Army lieutenant general
- Sergey Malyshev, several people
- Valeri Malyshev
- Volodymyr Malyshev (born 1950), Ukrainian politician
- Vyacheslav Malyshev (1902–1957), Soviet politician buried in the Kremlin Wall Necropolis
- Yekaterina Malysheva (born 1987), Russian speed skater
- Yelena Malysheva (born 1961), Russian physician and TV presenter
- Yury Malyshev, several people
