= Krasnoyarsk Geologists' Affair =

Geologists accused of sabotage

Geologists' Affair
- Full case name: Krasnoyarsk Geologists' Affair
- Decided: 1949–1950 (investigation process) Rehabilitation in March 1954
- Verdict: Sentenced to various terms of imprisonment in a labor camp (from 10 to 25 years) with confiscation of property and deprivation of rights for 5 years. The sentence was handed down on October 28, 1950.
- Charge: Incorrect assessment and deliberate concealment of mineral deposits, sabotage, espionage, counterrevolutionary agitation.

The Krasnoyarsk Geologists' Affair or Geologists' Affair (Russian: Красноярское дело геологов, Дело геологов) was an investigative process carried out in the Soviet Union in 1949–1950, involving charges against a group of geologists accused of incorrect evaluation, deliberate concealment of mineral deposits, and sabotage during the search for uranium deposits in Siberia.

In March 1954, the case was dismissed due to lack of evidence, and all convicted geologists were rehabilitated.

== Background ==
On 14 September 1929, the Supreme Council of the National Economy of the USSR and the People's Commissariat of Finance approved by joint order the "Rules of the Supreme Council of the National Economy of the USSR and the People's Commissariat of Finance of the USSR on remuneration for discoverers of new deposits of uranium and other radium-bearing ores". Private individuals could also be rewarded.

The emergence of the Krasnoyarsk Geologists' Affair is associated with an acute crisis in the Soviet atomic bomb project. The problem arose due to a critical shortage of explored industrial uranium deposits in the USSR. Uranium was required for the project to create a Soviet atomic bomb.

The use of nuclear weapons by the United States against Japan, and the Soviet leadership's awareness —albeit in general terms— of the existence of Plan Totality, as well as subsequent U.S. plans for preventive military actions against the USSR involving nuclear weapons, (Note: Таких как: «Пинчер» (1946 г.), «Бройлер» (1947 г.), «Бушвэкер» (1948 г.), «Кранкшафт» (1948 г.), «Хафмун» (1948 г.), «Флитвуд» (англ. Fleetwood, 1948 г.), «Когвилл» (1948 г.), «Оффтэк» (1948 г.), «Чариотир» (англ. Charioteer — «Колесничий», 1948 г.), «Дропшот» (англ. Dropshot, 1949 г.), «Троян» (англ. Trojan, 1949 г.).) formed the basis for the mobilization of all possible Soviet resources to achieve nuclear military parity.

The exceptional urgency of the problem of searching for uranium and thorium industrial raw materials for the USSR's atomic program from August 1945 to the late 1950s was also emphasized in a departmental order concerning Dalstroy. Order of the Main Directorate of Dalstroy No. 0053 of 25 August 1945 prescribed that "all heads and chief geologists of geological exploration divisions of mining administrations and district geological directorates begin compiling plans for uranium prospecting within their territories. For this purpose, immediately begin laboratory testing for radioactivity and uranium minerals of all archival samples, as well as samples collected by field parties in the current year, especially from tin, tungsten, cobalt, and rare-metal deposits. Introduce monthly summaries of uranium mineralization findings for all geological exploration divisions and district geological directorates starting 1 October… For geologists who discovered uranium deposits and production managers, large monetary bonuses and state awards were established by government decision".

In late 1945, within the system of the Committee for Geological Affairs, a Directorate was established to oversee the search and exploration of radioactive ore deposits. The first heads of the Directorate were Sergey Vasilyevich Goryunov and Iosif Fyodorovich Grigoriev.

In 1946, awards were established for the discovery of uranium deposits. Prospecting work began with mass checks of the radioactivity of rock samples in museums and storage facilities of geological organizations, collected at different times from a wide variety of mineral deposits, in the best case from previously identified uranium occurrences. Very great importance was attached to this work; subsequently, this was reflected in the official designation of one of the organizational forms of uranium prospecting — "mass prospecting". A number of governmental resolutions and regulations were adopted, making their implementation mandatory for all geological exploration organizations of the USSR.

Local historians and hunters were widely involved in providing feasible assistance to geologists. In 1945, the newspaper Pravda published a government appeal calling on the population — schoolchildren, teachers of natural sciences, local ore experts, tourists, prospectors, collective farmers, members of cooperatives, fishermen, hunters, and local historians — to help geologists search for ores and mineral raw materials needed by the country. The urgency of the problem of searching for industrial uranium deposits in the USSR was not lost even in the second half of the 1950s; thus, in the October 1956 issue of the magazine Yuniy Technik, a very detailed appeal article was published, containing detailed practical advice and addressed to young pioneer geologists on "how to search for uranium".

=== Shestakova's Memorandum ===
In 1947, the lawyer and journalist A. F. Shestakova (born 1904) arrived in Minusinsk as a correspondent for the newspaper Pravda. In October, after numerous "signals" concerning the presence of radioactive ores and heavy-metal ores in the territory of Krasnoyarsk Krai —sent to all authorities, including the newspaper Pravda, and to Moscow— by the local historian N. V. Surin, and by the independent local historian and amateur geologist I. G. Prokhorov (born 1887), Shestakova examined ownerless geological collections that had been taken from the museum attic into the backyard of the Minusinsk Regional Museum named after N. M. Martyanov, where she discovered a specimen presumed to be uranium ore. The specimen, however, was labeled as limestone from the old, exhausted copper deposit "Yuliya". Shestakova sent the найденный specimen for analysis to the well-known mineralogist K. A. Nenadkevich in Moscow. The specimen was found to contain 1.5% uranium.

After several letters by Shestakova sent to Beria and Stalin, to the newspaper Pravda, as well as thematically related statements submitted to authorities by some geologists in the field, the receipt of similar signals about local geologists ignoring the opinions of local historians, hunters, and beekeepers, and the discussion of Shestakova's memorandum, the leadership of the USSR formed a version alleging that geologists were concealing deposits of heavy and rare metals, including uranium, in Siberia, in Altai (now the territory of Eastern Kazakhstan), in Tuva, in the Minusinsk region, and in Krasnoyarsk Krai.

In the Archive of the President of the Russian Federation there are preserved:

- 22 March 1949 — Memorandum by A. B. Aristov and P. N. Pospelov "On important deposits of uranium minerals in Krasnoyarsk Krai and the reasons for delays in their development," with an appendix consisting of a report on the "Yuliya" mine, compiled by A. F. Shestakova on 1 March 1949. (File 175.)
- 30 March–21 April 1949 — Resolutions of the Politburo of the Central Committee of the All-Union Communist Party (Bolsheviks), the Council of Ministers of the USSR, and materials on the state of affairs in the Ministry of Geology and on measures to improve the work of the Ministry, on the condition of geological exploration in Krasnoyarsk Krai based on reports by A. F. Shestakova and P. N. Pospelov. (File 176.)
- 14 May 1949 — Memorandum by P. N. Pospelov addressed to I. V. Stalin, with an appendix containing a copy of his memorandum of 19 November 1946 and works by A. F. Shestakova, "On the history of the question of searches for radium in the depths of Russia," "A little about the past of Krasnoyarsk Krai," and "On the question of Siberian soda," concerning the wrecking activities of a group of geologists of Krasnoyarsk Krai, individual deposits, and mineral-resource regions. (File 177.)
- 15 May 1949 — Memorandum by P. N. Pospelov addressed to I. V. Stalin, with an appendix containing the memorandum by A. F. Shestakova "On the presumed area of the deposit from which specimen no. 23 originates and where to search for its analogues," on the state of raw-material reserves of non-ferrous and rare metals in Krasnoyarsk Krai. (File 178.)

=== Predominant opinion in exploration geology of those years ===
By Resolution No. 2628–713ss, the Council of People's Commissars of the USSR obligated the Committee for Geologists' Affairs to direct the main scientific and engineering personnel, as well as technical and material resources, toward ensuring geological prospecting for uranium, organizing for this purpose, on 1 April 1946, 270 field parties, including 28 geological exploration parties, 158 prospecting-and-mapping parties, and 84 revision parties, to operate in various regions of the country. The geological service had not previously known such tempos or such targeted organization on a nationwide scale.

However, the results of the search for uranium deposits in 1946–1947 were deemed unsatisfactory by the Council of Ministers.

The situation in the state committees responsible for subsoil resources was further exacerbated by the public and firm position of a number of geologists, including Ya. S. Edelstein, who had worked in the Minusinsk region for about 20 years, the senior geologist of the Geological Committee, editor of the multivolume edition Geologiya SSSR, and one of the largest and most authoritative geologist–geomorphologists. He asserted, that there were no uranium deposits in Siberia and could not be any, which was an erroneous assertion from the standpoint of geological science. (Note: This approach to Siberia was prevalent in Soviet geology at the time and significantly altered the direction of uranium exploration and prospecting efforts in the country.)

However, in the Council of Ministers, the Ministry of State Security (MGB), which was responsible for the extraction of uranium and thorium for the Soviet Atomic Project, and in the Politburo, it was known that in 1947 a sufficiently large deposit had been discovered (the so-called "Strelkinsky" uranium site, the Eastern "lead" mining administration, later transformed into the prospecting administration of Yeniseystroi of the Ministry of Internal Affairs; exploration was carried out by chief geologist A. A. Yakzhin), and that from 1948 intensive mining of uranium ore was underway in Krasnoyarsk Krai in the southern part of the Yenisei Ridge, at the Ust-Angarsk settlement (approximately 900 people; at peak production up to eight mines and several adits; closed in the late 1950s), by civilian mine workers.

Since January 1949, mining was also conducted at the Kodar deposit (other names: the "Marble" deposit; the Ermakovskoye mining administration), discovered in 1948, which later turned out to be small but exceptionally rich in uranium content in the ore.

In January 1949, the leadership of certain agencies overseeing geological prospecting and exploration for uranium reported to the government and the Ministry of Internal Affairs the discovery of the Taimyr uranium-ore province in the north of Krasnoyarsk Krai, without waiting for full confirmation of its reserves and the prospects of its deposits from geologists, which had been requested by L. Beria prior to the final report to the government (the Eastern Taimyr Kamenskoye deposit, "Rybak"; uranium content in individual samples from the ore body up to 1.4%).

== Beginning and course ==
On 30 March 1949, at a regular meeting of the Politburo of the Central Committee of the All-Union Communist Party (Bolsheviks), one of the agenda items was a report by P. N. Pospelov and A. F. Shestakova on the state of geological exploration in Krasnoyarsk Krai. Based on the report, a commission was established under the leadership of L. P. Beria; its members also included Malenkov, Mikoyan, V. S. Abakumov, P. A. Zakharov, A. B. Aristov, P. N. Pospelov, and A. F. Shestakova. The commission was tasked with clarifying the situation in the Ministry of Geology within ten days and taking appropriate measures, as well as preparing a conclusion "On the work of the USSR Ministry of State Security in exposing saboteurs in geology, particularly in the north and south of Krasnoyarsk Krai".

On the previous day, 29 March, outside the framework of the Krasnoyarsk affair, N. E. Martyanov and O. K. Poletaeva were arrested in Tomsk. On the day following the Politburo meeting, 31 March, I. K. Bazhenov, E. D. Tomashpolskaya, A. G. Vologdin, I. F. Grigoriev, and Y. M. Sheinmann were arrested. On 3 April, V. N. Dominikovsky; and on 7 April, L. I. Shamansky. After this, for two and a half weeks, "successful" work was carried out with the arrested individuals. On 25 April, a new wave of arrests of Tomsk professors followed: A. Ya. Bulynnikov, M. I. Kuchin, and F. N. Shakhov.

Two weeks later, a third and largest wave of arrests began: on 9 May, V. K. Kotulsky; on 12 May, V. V. Bogatsky; on 14 May, N. Ya. Kogan, B. K. Likharev, G. M. Skuratov, B. F. Speransky, V. A. Khakhlov, and others; on 23 May, V. M. Kreiter; and on 30 May, M. P. Rusakov.

Thus, in Moscow, the corresponding member of the USSR Academy of Sciences A. G. Vologdin, the director of the Institute of Geological Sciences of the USSR Academy of Sciences academician I. F. Grigoriev, the adviser to the Minister of Geology M. I. Gurevich, the chairman of the technical council of the Ministry of Geology professor V. M. Kreiter, and the chief geologist of the Tuva Geological Exploration Expedition Y. M. Sheinmann were arrested; in Leningrad, research staff of VSEGEI V. N. Vereshchagin, V. N. Dominikovsky, B. K. Likharev, Ya. S. Edelstein, and professors V. K. Kotulsky and M. M. Tetyayev; in Tomsk, professors and lecturers of the Tomsk Polytechnic Institute and Tomsk State University I. K. Bazhenov, A. Ya. Bulynnikov, M. I. Kuchin, V. D. Tomashpolskaya, V. A. Khakhlov, and F. N. Shakhov; and in Irkutsk, lecturer of the Mining and Metallurgical Institute L. I. Shamansky. Academician of the Academy of Sciences of the Kazakh SSR M. P. Rusakov, head of an expedition of ZSGU B. F. Speransky, chief engineer of the trust "Zapsibtsvetmetrazvedka" K. S. Filatov, and a large group of geologists from Krasnoyarsk—V. V. Bogatsky, N. Ya. Kogan, Yu. F. Pogonya-Stefanovich, O. K. Poletaeva, A. A. Predtechensky, N. F. Ryabokon, G. M. Skuratov, and others—were also arrested.

The USSR Minister of Geology I. I. Malyshev was summoned to the Kremlin. After a conversation with Stalin, he suffered a massive myocardial infarction and was removed from his post as minister and demoted, being transferred to Karelia to conduct targeted prospecting and development of iron ore deposits for the Cherepovets Metallurgical Plant.

=== Court of Honor of the Ministry of Geology ===
Detailed information about the proceedings of the Court of Honor of the Ministry of Geology is lacking, but it is known that courts of honor were held against leading geologists of VSEGEI, lecturers of the geology faculty of Leningrad State University and the Mining Institute as part of the campaign against cosmopolitanism. These proceedings preceded the arrests of some geologists of the Institute of Geological Sciences of the USSR Academy of Sciences and the dismissal of the USSR Minister of Geology I. I. Malyshev. According to later recollections of participants, "the investigative process, as it is said, took place in Moscow at the very Ministry of Geology of the USSR and at the editorial office of the newspaper Pravda. Specialists from geological services of many cities of the former Union, professors, scholars, enterprise managers, and others were summoned to the process", up to 200 people.

=== Reasons for the process' beginning ===
The facts and their interpretation by Shestakova, as well as other "signals from below" from local historians and individuals involved in "mass prospecting" on the ground, were used as the formal public reason for launching an eighteen-month investigation.

The problem of the lack of uranium to load an industrial plutonium-producing reactor was so critical that, by decision of I. V. Stalin and L. P. Beria, funding was provided "on the fly," based on actual expenditures, without previously approved estimates. Decisions on carrying out geological exploration and constructing enterprises for uranium mining and ore processing were often made in a forced manner, with violations of the generally accepted staging of these works (prospecting, evaluation, preliminary exploration, detailed ore exploration, design, and construction of mines). This led to conflicts between the leadership of the First (uranium) Main Directorate of the USSR Ministry of Geology and the First Main Directorate under the Special Committee of the Council of People's Commissars (Council of Ministers) of the USSR. Former head of the geological department of the First Main Directorate E. A. Pyatov, describing the situation of those years, noted: "The leadership of the Main Directorate of the USSR Ministry of Geology, and especially the chief geologist, Academician I. F. Grigoriev, who was brought up in the tradition of observing proper staging, opposed large-scale geological exploration and operational work at insufficiently prepared sites".

The true reason lay in the catastrophic shortage of explored strategic non-ferrous, rare, and radioactive natural resources under conditions of extremely rigid confrontation with the United States in the period from 1945 to the late 1950s, the critical discrepancy between the very modest results of the work of Soviet geologists in the search for and exploration of uranium and other heavy metal deposits in 1946–1947, and the state funds spent on these searches, as well as an interdepartmental conflict of interests among organizations responsible for supplying the defense industry with uranium.

== Further course and conclusion ==
A number of leading geologists responsible for forecasting the development of the USSR's resource base, as well as for directing and planning geological exploration work for strategic resources, were accused of criminal negligence, incorrect predictive assessments of promising ore districts, and sabotage in the conduct and organization of prospecting for deposits of rare and radioactive metals.

For example, the conviction of one of the principal defendants in the case included the following wording of the official charges: "being one of the leaders of the geological service in the USSR Grigoriev was well acquainted with the deposits of Altai and their significance, conceals rich deposits of rare metals in Altai and obstructs their industrial development".

By October 1950, after several months of interrogations involving physical and psychological pressure on the defendants, almost all of them had signed self-incriminating confessions.

On 28 November 1950, the scientists were informed that one month earlier they had been sentenced in absentia by the Special Council of the USSR Ministry of State Security "for incorrect evaluation and deliberate concealment of mineral deposits, sabotage, espionage, and counter-revolutionary agitation", and that they had been sentenced to various terms of imprisonment in corrective labor camps (from 10 to 25 years), with confiscation of property and deprivation of rights for five years.

== Toward an assessment of the possible reasons for initiating the Krasnoyarsk Affair ==
At present, memoirs, documents, and several interviews with geologists have been published, (Note: "... I know people who have searched their whole lives and found nothing. After all, a geologist is always alone with himself in his search. Some even had instruments that ‘crackled’, signalling the presence of uranium. But they found a convenient explanation that it was ‘a meaningless rock anomaly’. They needed to dig, to dig into the ground, to really be sure of the negative result. But, in addition to desire, you also need knowledge to be able to think on a large scale. — Is it true that the Streltsovskoye deposit could have been discovered much earlier? — Back in 1955, I assessed the uranium deposits in the Streltsovskoye depression, where Krasnokamensk is now located and the Priargunsky uranium plant operates. Our report at the time included a note about the need to focus work there. A year later, other people came... and gave a negative conclusion. They said that the ore deposits were weak and not worth paying attention to. They were more authoritative back then, and people believed them. In 1962, I was again appointed head of the search and exploration party in the same Priargunsky district. But now I had both planes and drilling rigs at my disposal. I could make decisions. Before that, I had already discovered a number of other deposits. However, the work was planned to be carried out not in “my” place. I said: I don't give a damn about this project — and concentrated all my efforts where I thought it was necessary. We drilled the rig. The core turned out to be uranium. We set up two more rigs. They drilled. But on the same day, an order came, and for my insolence, they sent me to the North, to work underground. I said, “How can that be? It smells like ore!” And they replied, “You don't want to go to the North. You're a coward! You're afraid of difficulties.” So I went. A week later, all work at “my” site was shut down. The pipes were pulled out of the ground. The site was liquidated. And they started working on the previous project. And then, when everything was confirmed and it became clear that good uranium ore had been found, the head of our Sosnovskaya expedition, Stepanov, brought me back. Later, he admitted that he was restoring justice in this way. Search and exploration party number 32 was specially created, which I headed. It was the largest party in the Soviet Union. Then, through its efforts, a whole series of uranium deposits was discovered in the Streltsovsky trough. (From Interview with V. P. Zenchenko, discoverer of the Streltsovsky uranium deposit, winner of the 1970 Lenin Prize, awarded to him and other geologists for the discovery of this uranium deposit // Nehaev O. The Uranium Man. sibirica.su. Access date: 2 April 2020. Archived: 28 September 2020).) confirming the existence in those years of certain real cases of "incorrect assessment and deliberate concealment of deposits of strategic mineral resources". Such, for example, is the history of the discovery, exploration, and concealment of the Kamenskoye uranium deposit in 1948–1952 (Rybak settlement, Taymyr Peninsula in the north of Krasnoyarsk Krai), the complex fate of the discovery of a large group of the Streltsovskoye uranium deposits in Priargunye in the southeast of Chita Oblast in Southeastern Siberia, and the history of development, depletion, exploration, and artificially prolonged liquidation of the exhausted Kodar (Ermakovskoye) uranium deposit.

Such data may provide grounds for a new assessment of the reasons for initiating, the course of, and the consequences of the Krasnoyarsk Affair of geologists.

== Changes in geological exploration practice after the investigation ==
In the practice of postwar Soviet geology, so-called Central Audit Parties already existed, (Note: See Resolution of the Council of Ministers of the USSR No. 2802-892ss/op on awarding bonuses to geologists of the Central Revision Party for the discovery of the Kryvyi Rih uranium deposit in 1946.) as well as prospecting-audit geological and geophysical parties, which were engaged in selecting sites for future prospecting and exploration work in territories already covered by geological and geophysical surveys, carried out such work, and conducted audits of old and depleted deposits. This practice proved successful and was preserved until the end of the existence of the USSR and the Ministry of Geology.

=== Special audit parties ===
Almost simultaneously with the start of the investigative proceedings in the Krasnoyarsk affair, in order to identify instances of erroneous reserve assessments, overlooked or underestimated prospective ore occurrences, deposits, and ore fields in all territorial geological exploration divisions, so-called SAPs (Special Audit Parties) were formed from geologists by order of the new Minister of Geology P. A. Zakharov.

They carried out audits, reviews, and independent geological expert assessments, checking the results of prospecting work from recent years with the aim of identifying undiscovered or erroneously overlooked deposits of strategic raw materials, as well as verifying the correctness of exploration work conducted at previously identified deposits of such natural resources, submitting their reports and memoranda to the First Chief Directorate, the Ministry of Geology of the USSR, and the Commission for Mineral Reserves Estimation (KGZ; from 1 July 1954, the KGZ under the Council of Ministers of the USSR).

The SAPs continued to operate from 1949 to 1959; from the summer of 1959, due to the reorganization of the First Chief Directorate, the system of the Ministry of Internal Affairs and the Ministry of State Security, which at that time were responsible for the exploration and extraction of precious metals, rare elements, rare metals (tin, tungsten, molybdenum, bismuth, arsenic, antimony, and mercury), and radioactive metals, it was decided to terminate the work of the SAPs and reorganize them into their departmental analogues.

On 27 December 1949, in order to intensify the extraction and processing of uranium ores, the Second Chief Directorate under the Council of Ministers of the USSR (SGD) was created on the basis of the First Directorate of the First Chief Directorate. Several enterprises and construction projects were transferred to the SGD from the First Chief Directorate. Management and control over the activities of the SGD were also carried out exclusively by the Special Committee. The separation of the mining industry contributed to a sharp increase in uranium production. Mining was carried out both within the territory of the USSR and in the "people's democracies" of Eastern Europe.

By 1953, the problem of increasing uranium ore production had largely been resolved, and on 16 March 1953 the Council of Ministers of the USSR adopted a resolution to merge the First and Second Chief Directorates into a single body — the First Chief Directorate under the Council of Ministers of the USSR.

The First Chief Directorate, responsible for the entire cycle of supporting the Soviet Atomic Project, began independently, bypassing the Ministry of Geology, to ensure all geological stages from prospecting to operational support of rare-earth and uranium deposits, and in 1953 was transformed into the Ministry of Medium Machine Building. There, the practice of carrying out a full cycle of specialized prospecting and geological exploration, initiated by the geologists of Yeniseystroy and Dalstroy, was preserved.

=== Risks and errors in geology ===
The Krasnoyarsk affair of geologists in 1949–1950 not only shattered the lives of many of the USSR’s leading geologists, but also revealed the lack, from the late 1940s to the mid-1950s, of tested methodologies for a systemic approach and of criteria necessary to achieve and implement economically or strategically successful projects in industrial applied geology. It accelerated the separation of geology as a science from industrial geology and закрепило the withdrawal of full geological work cycles in a number of areas into the geological services of specialized ministries, such as the Ministry of Non-Ferrous Metallurgy, the Ministry of Medium Machine Building, and the Ministry of the Oil Industry of the USSR.

The cost of errors by geological specialists, (Note: The extremely precise system of personal responsibility that existed in industrial geology in the early post-war and war years was described by geophysicist and writer Oleg Kuvaev in his novel Territory: "What next? A new gold-bearing province is needed. The state must risk tens of millions. — It will take the risk. But you personally are risking everything. If it fails, the state will lose tens of millions. You will lose everything. You will be gone." // Kuvayev, O. M. Territory. This episode fully reveals the true reasons for the initiation of criminal investigations against geologists in the Krasnoyarsk case.) in predictive, prospecting, exploration, and evaluation work on deposits and ore clusters, and of incorrect state planning based on such errors, was always extremely high, amounting to tens and hundreds of millions of Soviet rubles.

For example, a well-known case of a major geological error is considered to be the many-fold underestimation of reserves at the Sheregesh, Tashtagol, and Teya deposits of Kemerovo Oblast in Western Siberia, as a result of which the design capacities of the iron ore mines put into operation turned out to be very small.

Nowadays, systematic risk assessments in decision-making for such work are addressed by the discipline of economic geology, which emerged for approximately the same reasons that led to the Krasnoyarsk affair.

From the mid-1920s to the present, in cases of doubt regarding the results of prospecting, exploration, and predictive work, independent geological audit and expertise have been carried out, either state-run or private.

== Involved geologists' further life ==
For six professors, the arrests of 1949–1950 proved fatal:

- Grigoryev I. F., Gurievich M. I. (referent of the Minister of Geology), Shamansky L. I. — did not live to see the trial.
- Edelstein Ya. S. — died immediately after the verdict was pronounced in a prison hospital in Leningrad.
- Kotulsky V. K. — died en route to Norilsk.
- Kogan N. Ya. — died in the camp.

Among the repressed were well-known scientists:

- Balandin, Aleksey Alexandrovich (1898–1967)
- Bogatsky, Vyacheslav Vyacheslavovich (1913–1981)
- Bulynnikov, Alexander Yakovlevich (1892–1972)
- Vologdin, Alexander Grigoryevich (1896–1971)
- Grigoryev, Iosif Fyodorovich (1890–1949)
- Kotulsky, Vladimir Klimentyevich (1879–1951)
- Kreiter, Vladimir Mikhailovich (1897–1966)
- Kuchin, Mikhail Ivanovich (1887–1963)
- Luchitsky, Igor Vladimirovich (1912–1983)
- Pogrebitsky, Evgeny Osipovich (1900–1976)
- Rusakov, Mikhail Petrovich (1892–1963)
- Safronov, Nikolai Ilyich (1904–1982)
- Speransky, Boris Fyodorovich (1885–1956)
- Tetyaev, Mikhail Mikhailovich (1882–1956)
- Khakhlov, Venedikt Andreyevich (1894–1972)
- Shakhov, Felix Nikolaevich (1894–1971)

The main part of the convicted geologists served their sentences in scientific-production "sharashkas", where exploration, research, prospecting, surveying, and development of promising and operating uranium deposits and mines were carried out, in various parts of the USSR: Krasnoyarsk (OTB-1 of Yeniseystroy, including, for example, the Central Mineralogical-Petrographic Laboratory of Yeniseystroy), Magadan (Northern KTE No. 8), Norillag, Pevek — Chaun ITL (Chaunlag, ITL of Office p/o 14) of Dalstroy Gulag, Vorkuta.

In the geological department of OTB-1 were geologists Bulynnikov, Kreiter, Kuchin, Pogonya-Stefanovich, Rusakov, Tetyaev. Luchitsky also worked here. The head of the department was appointed Musatov, transferred to Krasnoyarsk from the OTB in Zagorsk near Moscow. In Kolyma worked Bazhenov, Bogatsky, Vereshchagin, Vologdin, Predtechensky, Ryabokon, Skuratov, Filatov, Shakhov, Sheinmann. Balandin, Dominikovsky, Likharev, Khakhlov ended up in Norillag. Women geologists Poletaeva and Tomashpolskaya served their terms in the Mariinsk camps on general works.

== Rehabilitation ==
Academician A. A. Balandin, summer 1953 — a government directive ordered the immediate transfer of A. A. Balandin to Moscow. Rehabilitation was carried out thanks to a petition by N. D. Zelinsky, with reinstatement to his position, restoration of awards and titles, and allocation of an apartment. On 13 June, he was reinstated in the rank of academician.

By 1953, the problem of increasing uranium ore production in the USSR had largely been resolved.

In 1954, under public pressure, the legal rehabilitation of the affected geologists began in small groups.

Rehabilitation certificates dated 31 March and 10 April 1954 stated, "The decision of the Special Council of 28 October 1950 has been annulled, and the case has been closed due to lack of proof of the charges". In some certificates, a different wording was used: "The decision of the Special Council of 28 October 1950 has been annulled, and the case has been closed due to the absence of corpus delicti".

Upon returning to their places of work, they were reinstated in their positions; their academic degrees and awards were returned, and party membership was restored with full recognition of seniority.

On 26 October 1956, the Party Control Commission convened to consider a petition by V. M. Kreiter, which he had addressed to N. Khrushchev. A. F. Shestakova was also invited to the commission, where she defended her own position and that of local regional historians, and was expelled from the CPSU.

On 23 October 1953, after a long hiatus, many geologists were elected as corresponding members of the Academy of Sciences of the USSR.

== Repeated analysis of Shestakova’s sample ==
In the mid-2000s, Shestakova’s sample no. 23, preserved in the Museum of Geology of Central Siberia, was subjected to repeated analysis, which revealed the presence of uranium–vanadium minerals carnotite and tyuyamunite in the sample. It was suggested that the sample may have originated from known uranium deposits of Central Asia.

== See also ==
- Geolkom Trial (1928–1929)

== Bibliography ==
In chronological order:

- Godlevskaya, N. Yu.; Kreiter, I. V. (1994). «Krasnoyarsk Case» of Geologists [«Красноярское дело» геологов] (in Russian). Vol. 2. Saint Petersburg: Unknown. pp. 158–166.
- Belyakov, P. L. (1999). «Krasnoyarsk Case» [«Красноярское дело»] (in Russian) (3rd ed.). Moscow; Saint Petersburg: VSEGEI. pp. 422–427.
- USSR Atomic Project: Documents and Materials. Vol. 2, Book 6. The Atomic Bomb, 1945–1954 [Атомный проект СССР. Документы и материалы. Т. 2, кн. 6. Атомная бомба, 1945—1954] (in Russian). Moscow; Sarov: Nauka; Fizmatlit; VNIIEF. 2006. ISBN 5-85165-402-3.
- Domarenko, V. A.; Rikhvanov, L. P. (2007). Essays on the History of the Study of Radioactivity and the Formation of Uranium Geology in Central Siberia. Essay One: Origins [Очерки по истории изучения радиоактивности и становлении урановой геологии в Центральной Сибири. Очерк первый. Истоки] (in Russian). Vol. 311.
- Domarenko, V. A.; Rikhvanov, L. P.; Molchanov, V. I.; Potseluev, A. A. (2008). Essays on the History of the Study of Radioactivity and the Formation of Uranium Geology in Central Siberia. Essay Two [Очерки по истории изучения радиоактивности и становлении урановой геологии в Центральной Сибири. Очерк второй] (in Russian). Vol. 312.
- Pshenichkin, A. Ya.; Rikhvanov, L. P. (2008). Repressed Geologists: Graduates and Staff of Tomsk Polytechnic University [Репрессированные геологи: выпускники и сотрудники Томского политехнического] (in Russian).
- Grek, O. G. (1999). «Krasnoyarsk Case» of Geologists (1949–1954) [«Красноярское дело» геологов (1949—1954 гг.)] (in Russian). Vol. 6. Krasnoyarsk: Krasnoyarsk State Pedagogical University. pp. 231–234.
- Vazhnov, Mikhail (2009). The Atomic Age: The Norilsk Trace [Атомный век: норильский след] (in Russian). Moscow: Polyarnaya Zvezda.
- Svinin, V. F. (2010). Geologists in the USSR Atomic Project. Part 1: 1940–1946 [Геологи в атомном проекте СССР. Ч. 1. 1940—1946] (in Russian).
- Svinin, V. F. (2010). Geologists in the USSR Atomic Project. Part 2: 1946–1953 [Геологи в атомном проекте СССР. Ч. 2. 1946—1953] (in Russian).
- Volobuev, Gennady (2013). Tarak Deposits: The Settlement of Tayozhny in the USSR Atomic Project [Таракские россыпи: посёлок Таёжный в Атомном проекте СССР] (in Russian) (2nd, expanded ed.). Krasnoyarsk: Bukva Stateinova.
