= Kalicki =

Kalicki (feminine: Kalicka; plural: Kaliccy) is a Polish surname. It may refer to:

- Jan Kalicki (1922–1953), Polish mathematician
- Jan Kalicki (drummer), British musician
- Kim Kalicki (born 1997), German bobsledder
- Włodzimierz Kalicki (born 1955), Polish writer

== See also ==
- Kasimir Petrovich Kalitsky ― Russian oil geologist.
