= Georgii Frederiks =

Russian scientist

- Георгий Николаевич Фредерикc
- Born: 1889; Volga region
- Died: February 18, 1938 (aged 48–49)
- Education: Kazan Imperial University
- Scientific career
- Fields: Geology
- Workplaces: Geological Committee; Perm State University; Mining Institute

Georgii Nikolaevich Frederiks (Russian: Георгий Николаевич Фредерикc) (1889–1938) was a Russian and Soviet geologist who specialized in paleontology, tectonics and stratigraphy. He described many fossil taxa before becoming a victim of the Great Terror.

G. N. Frederiks was born in the Volga region, graduated from the Kazan Imperial University in 1911, and obtained his master's degree in mineralogy and geognosy (geology) from there in 1917. He inherited the title of Baron from his father some time before April 1913. "This title was to cause him angst in subsequent years and, apparently, be a contributing factor to his death at the hands of the NKVD". He was employed by the Geological Committee from 1913, and between 1920 and 21 he was sent to inaugurate the teaching of geology at the newly autonomous Perm State University, where he served as professor, head of the Department of Geology, and dean of the Technical Faculty, then returned to the Geological Committee. In 1931 he was purged from the Geological Committee and went to work at the Mining Institute both in the palaeontology section of the Mining Museum and teaching in the Department of General Geology. At that time D. I. Mushketov was the director of the museum and head of the General Geology Department.

Skilled in languages and maintaining contact with foreign scientists and with White Russian scientists, he is said to have believed that science is independent of politics. He was arrested February 24, 1935, and exiled for three years to corrective labour camps, from which he was released eight months early, after which he returned to his home in Leningrad. He was arrested repeatedly after that and finally on June 13, 1937, was charged with deliberately misinterpreting the geological structure during explorations in the Chusovskie Gorodki Oil Field, and also with conspiracy to kill the leaders of the USSR. He was executed February 18, 1938, on the same day as his colleague and likely protector D. I. Mushketov and several other colleagues. Full exoneration (rehabilitation) was granted, posthumously, November 30, 1956.

As well as major contributions to stratigraphy and geological mapping, G. N. Frederiks is particularly remembered for his contributions to the paleontology of the late Paleozoic era (Carboniferous and Permian periods), notably Brachiopoda, Ammonoidea, and Bryozoa.

== Further references ==
- Web site of Perm State University with reference to G. N. Frederiks
- Geologist-to-geologist entry for G. N. Fredericks
- Orlov, V. P. et al. (eds, 1999) Репрессированных Геологи 3-е изд. (Repressed Geology, third edition), VSEGEI (in Russian)
