= Lebedinsky iron ore deposit =

Coordinates: 51.252°N 37.690°E

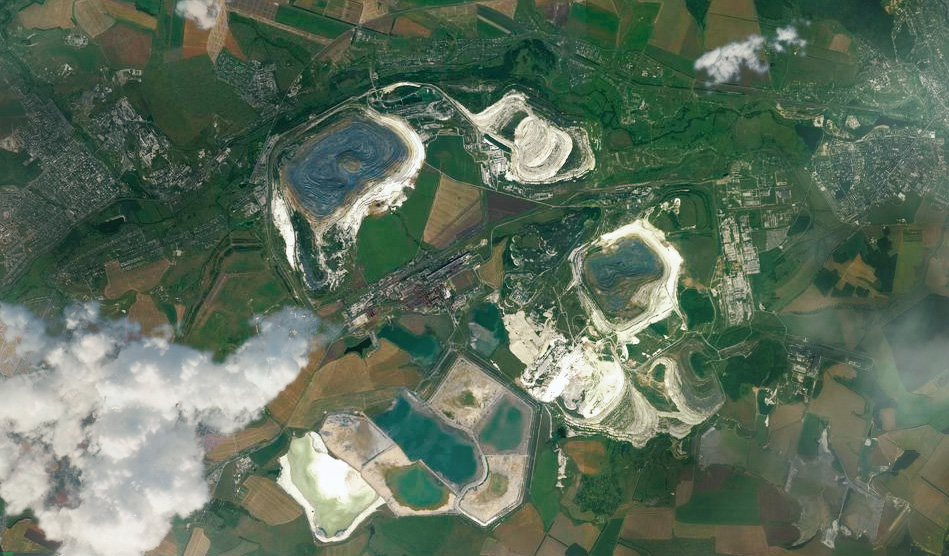

Lebedinsky iron ore deposit is an iron ore deposit in the Belgorod Oblast, near the city of Gubkin, on the territory of the Staro-Oskolsky iron ore region of the Kursk Magnetic Anomaly, which is on the balance sheet of Lebedinsky GOK OAO. It was discovered in 1956, the development of rich iron ores has been carried out since 1959, since 1973 a deposit of ferruginous quartzites has been developed. The explored reserves of iron ore are 4.3 billion tons with an Fe content of 44.6% . An ore deposit measuring one and a half by two kilometers lies at a depth of fifty to one hundred and sixty meters (upper limit). The main ore minerals are magnetite, hematite. Development is carried out in an open way. The average annual production is more than thirty-eight million tons of ore. The main administrative and industrial development centers are located in Gubkin and Stary Oskol.

== Sources ==
- Магматические месторождения // Рудные месторождения СССР : в 3 т. / Под ред. акад. В. И. Смирнова. — 2-е изд., перераб. и доп. — М. : Недра, 1978. — Т. 1. — С. 106—107. — 352 с. — 9000 экз.
- Лебединский горно-обогатительный комбинат // Горная энциклопедия: [в 5 томах] / гл. ред. Е. А. Козловский. — М.: «Советская энциклопедия», 1987. — Т. 3. Кенган — Орт. — С. 176. — 592 с. — 56 540 экз. — ISBN 5-85270-007-X.
