= Malyshev =

Malyshev may refer to:

- Malyshev Factory, a heavy equipment factory in Ukraine
- Malyshev (surname)
- 17139 Malyshev, minor planet
