= Vera Kalitskaya =

Vera Pavlovna Kalitskaya
- Вера Павловна Калицкая
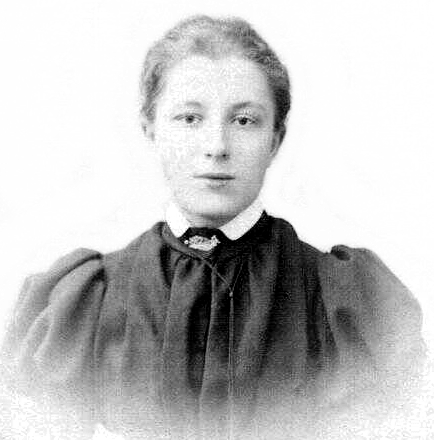
- 1898
- Born: 9 September 1828; Saint Petersburg, Russia
- Died: 20 November 1910 (aged 82); Leningrad, Russia
- Education: Bestuzhev Courses
- Occupations: Writer; Geologist
- Spouse(s): Alexander Grin; Kasimir Kalitsky
- Writing career
- Years active: 1904–1945
- Period: Modern
- Genres: short story, children's literature, biography, translation, correspondence
- Literary movement: Realism

Vera Pavlovna Kalitskaya (or Vera Pavlovna Abramova-Kalitskaya; née Abramova; pseudonym V. Alien; April 21, 1882, St.Petersburg – May 14, 1951 Leningrad) was a Russian and Soviet writer and publicist, editor, and author of children's, popular science books and memoirs. She was a member of the Leningrad City Committee of Writers and worked as a chemist in the analytical laboratory of the Geological Committee and the All-Russian Oil Research Geological Prospecting Institute.

== Early life and education ==
She was born on April 21, 1882 in Saint Petersburg, into the family of a civil servant of the State Control, Pavel Yegorovich Abramov (1852?–1913), and Olga Ivanovna (née Lazareva; 1852?–1887), from the nobility of the Simbirsk Governorate, who owned no real estate.

In 1898, she graduated from the Liteinaya Women's Gymnasium in St. Petersburg with a gold medal.

In 1902, she graduated from the Physics and Mathematics Department of the Higher Women's Courses (Bestuzhev Courses), specializing in chemistry.

From 1902 to 1904, she studied at the Women's Medical Institute in St. Petersburg but left after 2 years.

== Career ==
=== Teacher and medic ===
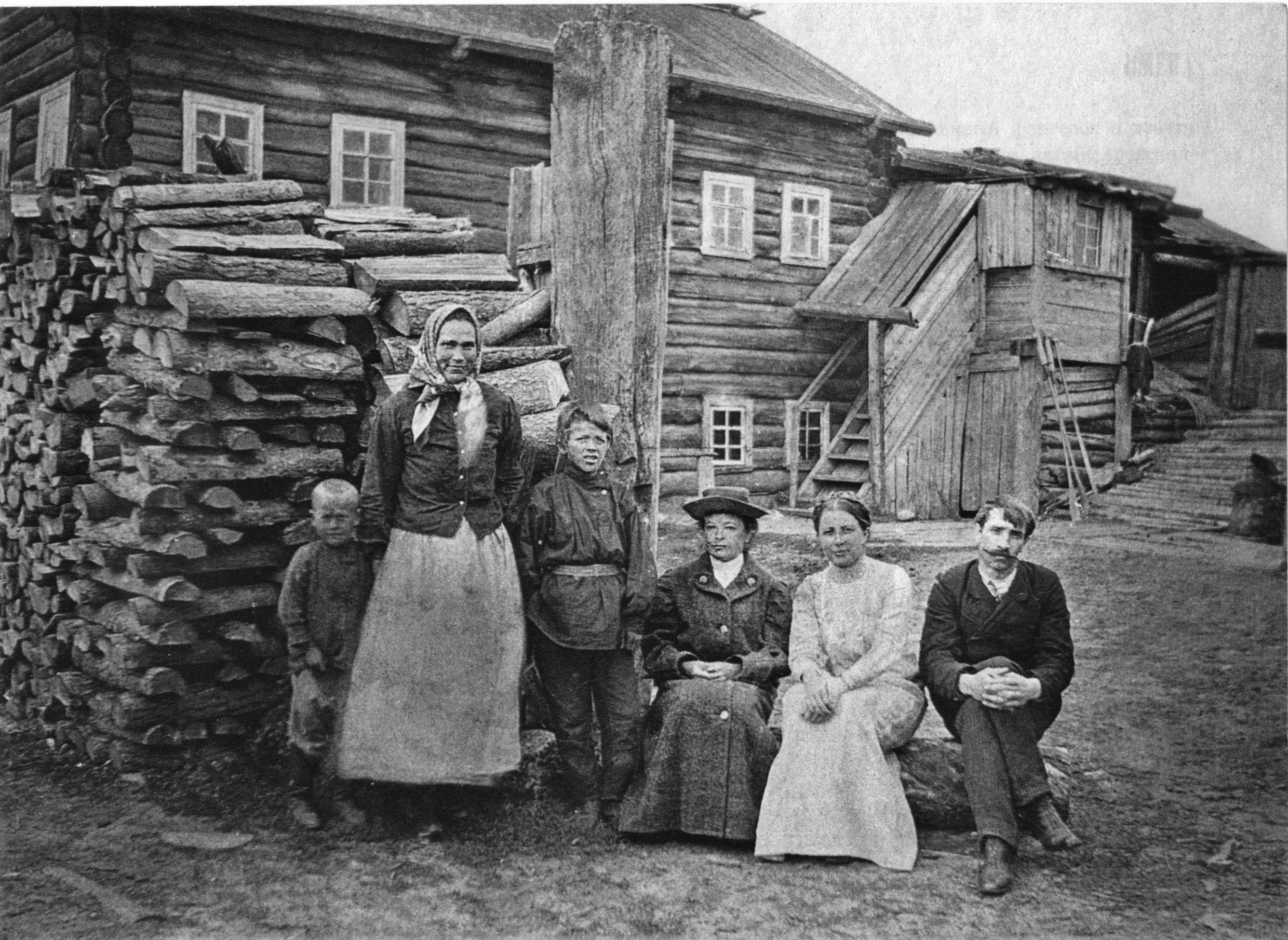
Vera Pavlovna with Alexander Grin in exile, 1911

From 1904 to 1907, she taught at the Smolensk Classes for Workers of the Technical Society, at the Nikolskoye Women's School, and at the Peskova Gymnasium.

During the revolutionary events of 1905, she worked as a medical worker in the underground revolutionary organization Red Cross, aiding political prisoners, where in 1906 she met the revolutionary and writer A. S. Grin (her first husband from 1910 to 1913).

From November 1910 to May 1912, she was in exile with Grin in Pinega and Kegostrov in the Arkhangelsk Governorate.

=== Chemist and geologist ===
From 1907 to 1910 and 1914–1922, she worked in the chemical laboratory of the Russian Geological Committee. From 1919, she participated in expeditions to the Volga region and Central Asia with an employee of the Geological Committee, Kasimir Petrovich Kalitsky. After the liquidation of the Geological Committee, from the 1930s she worked (with short breaks) at the All-Union Oil Geological Prospecting Institute (NGRI, VNII, VNIGRI).

From 1941 to 1942, she lived in besieged Leningrad, where her husband, the famous oil geologist K. P. Kalitsky, died of starvation and pneumonia on December 28, 1941.

=== Literary activity ===
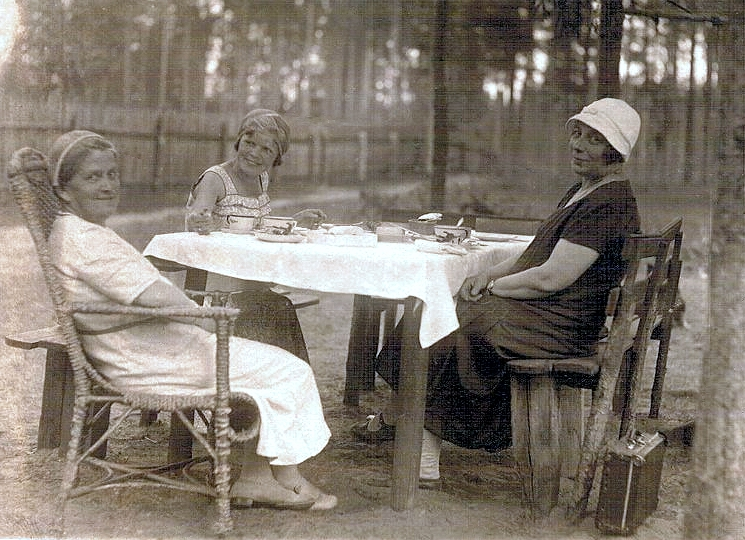
The Kalitskys and the Argentovs (1933 or 1922)

In 1904, she began publishing her first stories.

She was an employee, and later a member of the editorial board, of the journal "Chto i kak chitat' detyam" (What and How to Read to Children) in St. Petersburg (1912–1914).

She collaborated with journals (articles and editing): "Chitalnya narodnoy shkoly," "Protalinka," "Detskiy otdykh," "Tropinka," "Vskhody," "Vseobshchiy zhurnal."

In the 1920s, she was a member of Marshak's Circle of Children's Writers in Petrograd.

She was a member of the Leningrad City Committee of Writers.

From June 1942 until the summer of 1944, she was evacuated to the city of Kuibyshev.

From 1943 to 1945, she worked on her memoirs about K. P. Kalitsky, which remain unpublished to this day.

From January 1946, she worked as a translator at the Oil Institute (VNIGRI), working from home.

By 1948, she had finished her memoirs about Alexander Grin.

She died on May 14, 1951 in Leningrad at the age of sixty-nine.

She is buried at the Shuvalovskoye Cemetery.

== Family ==
First husband (1910–1913) — Alexander Grinevsky (Alexander Grin; 1880–1932) — member of the Socialist Revolutionary Party, writer.

Second husband (from spring 1917, officially from 1920) — Kasimir Petrovich Kalitsky (1873–1941) — oil geologist.

== Membership in organizations ==
From the 1920s, she was a member of the "Circle of Children's Writers" formed around S. Ya. Marshak.

- 1934 — Union of Soviet Writers.

== Bibliography ==
Main publications in Russian:

- Abramova V. Plitka shokolada [A Bar of Chocolate] // Detskiy otdykh [Children's Rest]. 1904. No. 7.
- Abramova V. Chyornoye bogatstvo [Black Wealth] // Detskiy otdykh. 1904. No. 10.
- Abramova V. V Laplandii [In Lapland]. Spb.: N. Morev, 1912. 30 p. (Chitalnya narodnoy shkoly. Zhurnal s kartinkami. Issue 8)
- Abramova V. Silach: Rasskaz [The Strongman: A Story]. St. Petersburg: N. Morev, 1913. 18 p. (Chitalnya narodnoy shkoly: Zhurnal s kartinkami; Issue 4)

Before 1918, her published translations and books included: S. Lagerlöf "The Handkerchief of St. Veronica," Ewing "The Gypsy Child," K. Gorbunov "The Triumph of Truth," Efim Chestnyakov "The Wonderful Apple," Stories and Songs of Uncle Misha, Charles Roberts "Children of the Waters and Forests."

- Abramova (Kalitskaya) V. P. Begletsy: Rasskazy dlya detey [The Runaways: Stories for Children]. Moscow-Petrograd: Gosudarstvennoye izdatel'stvo, 1923. 84 p.
- Abramova-Kalitskaya V. P. Loshad' Vasiliya Dmitrievicha [The Horse of Vasily Dmitrievich]. Moscow: G. F. Mirimanov, 1925. 23 p.; 2nd edition. 1928. 21 p. (Novaya biblioteka shkol'nika [New Schoolchild's Library])
- Kalitskaya V. P. V Laplandii [In Lapland]. M., 1925
- Kalitskaya V. P. O shimpanze, ikh kharaktere i ume: (Pis'ma s Tenerifa) [About Chimpanzees, Their Character and Intelligence: (Letters from Tenerife)]. Moscow: Mirimanov G. F., 1926. 32 p.(Biblioteka shkol'nika [Schoolchild's Library])
- Alien V. Khrabryy pastukh i velikiy uchenyy: rasskaz byl' [o L. Pasteure] [The Brave Shepherd and the Great Scientist: a true story [about L. Pasteur]]. Moscow: Mirimanov G. F., 1928. 48 p. (Biblioteka shkol'nika [Schoolchild's Library])
- Abramova-Kalitskaya V. P. Million glaz [o L. Girshmane] [A Million Eyes [about L. Hirschman]]. Moscow-Leningrad: Molodaya gvardiya, 1931. 166 p. (print run 10,000 copies)
- Abramova-Kalitskaya V. P. Iskateli nefti: Rasskazy dlya yunoshestva [Oil Prospectors: Stories for Youth] / ed. K. P. Kalitsky. Leningrad; Moscow; Novosibirsk: Gorgonefteizdat, 1933. 124 p. (Series Yunosheskaya nauchno-tekhnicheskaya biblioteka [Youth Scientific and Technical Library]). (print run 5,000 copies)
- Kalitskaya V. P. Vospominaniya ob Aleksandre Grine [Memoirs of Alexander Grin]. L.: Lenizdat, 1972. 157 p.
- Kalitskaya V. P. Moya zhizn' s Aleksandrom Grinom: vospominaniya, pis'ma [My Life with Alexander Grin: memoirs, letters] / comp. L. Varlamova, N. Yalova, D. Losev. Feodosiya: Izdatel'skiy dom Koktebel', 2010. 256 p. (ser. Obrazy bylogo [Images of the Past]; Issue 14); 2nd ed. 2021. 400 p. (ser. Portret mastera [Portrait of the Master]; Issue 6).

For the 150th anniversary of Kasimir Petrovich Kalitsky, a book by V. P. Kalitskaya titled "Kasimir Petrovich Kalitsky: Life and Works" (written in 1945) was prepared at the GIN RAS (though not yet published). It includes accompanying scientific articles and numerous comments and references to archival materials and literature.

== Residences ==
Lived at:

- 1907–1908 – St. Petersburg, 11th Line of Vasilievsky Island, building 44, apt. 24.
- 1909–1910 – 6th Line of V. O., building 1.
- 1917 – Autumn 1931 — Zverinskaya Street, building 17b, apt. 25.
- October 1931 – April 1951 — 5th Line of Vasilievsky Island, building 54, apt. 10.

== Literature ==
- Kalitskaya V. P. Avtobiografiya (22 iyunya 1950) [Autobiography (June 22, 1950)] — on the Alexander Grin website.
- Sandler V. Chetyre goda sledom za Grinom [Four Years Following Grin] // Prometey. 1968. Volume 5.
- Istoriya dorevolyutsionnoy Rossii v dnevnikakh i vospominaniyakh [History of Pre-revolutionary Russia in Diaries and Memoirs]. Moscow, 1976—1988. Vol. 4. Part 4.
- Kolotupova S. V. Vera Kalitskaya v krugu pisateley-sovremennikov [Vera Kalitskaya in the Circle of Contemporary Writers] // A. Grin. Stat'i, ocherki, issledovaniya. Feodosiya, 2014.
- Bardina S. Aleksandr Grin i yego "shuvalovskaya Shveytsariya" [Alexander Grin and his "Shuvalov Switzerland"] // Sankt-Peterburgskiye vedomosti. 2018, November 2.
- Bardina S. Peterburgskaya gavan' Aleksandra Grina: Adresa Nevskogo: dokumental'naya povest' [The St. Petersburg Harbor of Alexander Grin: Addresses of Nevsky: a documentary story]. – M. : Feodosiya: ID "Koktebel'", 2021. -(Obrazy bylogo [Images of the Past]. Issue 23).
