= Bekasovo =

Bekasovo (Russian: Бекасово) is the name of several rural localities in Russia:

- Bekasovo, Kaluga Oblast, a village in Yukhnovsky District of Kaluga Oblast
- Bekasovo, Moscow Oblast, a village under the administrative jurisdiction of the Town of Naro-Fominsk in Naro-Fominsky District of Moscow Oblast
