= Minkovo =

Minkovo (Russian: Миньково) is the name of several rural localities in Russia:

- Minkovo, Yukhnovsky District, Kaluga Oblast, a village in Yukhnovsky District of Kaluga Oblast
- Minkovo, Zhukovsky District, Kaluga Oblast, a village in Zhukovsky District of Kaluga Oblast
- Minkovo, Vologda Oblast, a selo in Minkovsky Selsoviet of Babushkinsky District of Vologda Oblast
