= Yukhnov =

Yukhnov Юхнов
- Town
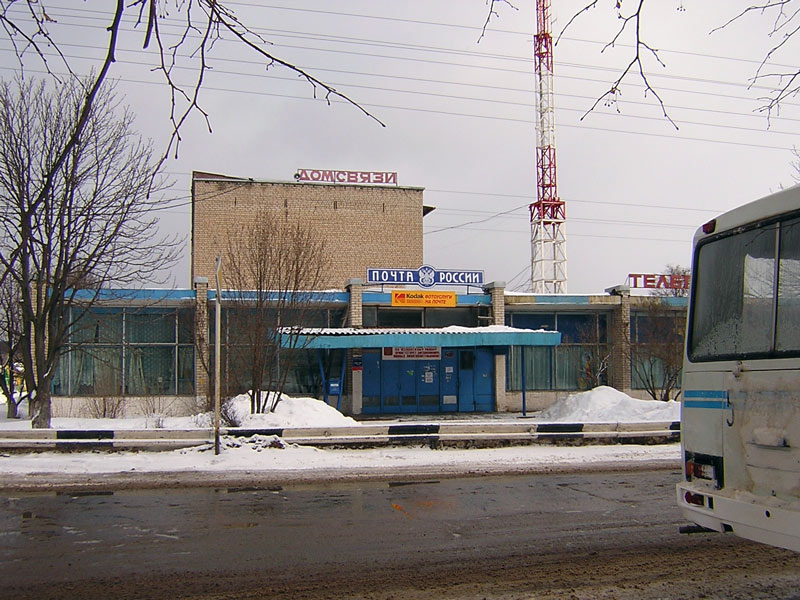
- Post office in Yukhnov

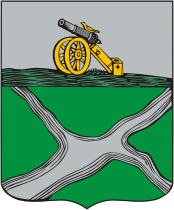
- Coat of arms
- Interactive map of Yukhnov
- Location of Yukhnov Yukhnov (Kaluga Oblast)
- Coordinates: 54°44′40″N 35°13′47″E
- Country: Russia
- Federal subject: Kaluga Oblast
- Administrative district: Yukhnovsky District
- Known since: 1410
- Town status since: 1777
- Elevation: 150 m (490 ft)

Population (2010 Census)
  - Total: 7,056
  - Estimate (2023): 6,470 (−8.3%)

Administrative status
  - Capital of: Yukhnovsky District

Municipal status
  - Municipal district: Yukhnovsky Municipal District
  - Urban settlement: Yukhnov Urban Settlement
  - Capital of: Yukhnovsky Municipal District, Yukhnov Urban Settlement
- Time zone: UTC+3 (MSK)
- Postal codes: 249910, 249911, 249929
- OKTMO ID: 29650101001
- Website: angrykpi.com/ru

Yukhnov (Russian: Ю́хнов) is a town and the administrative center of Yukhnovsky District in Kaluga Oblast, Russia, located on the Kunava River (Oka's basin) 85 kilometers (53 mi) northwest of Kaluga, the administrative center of the oblast. Population: 6,610 (2021 census); 7,056 (2010 census); 7,692 (2002 census); 6,059 (1989 Soviet census).

== History ==
It has been known since 1410. Town status was granted in 1777.

During the Second World War the town was occupied by the Germans from October 5, 1941 to March 5, 1942. In late 1941, the Germans operated the Dulag 112 prisoner-of-war camp in the town.

== Administrative and municipal status ==
Within the framework of administrative divisions, Yukhnov serves as the administrative center of Yukhnovsky District, to which it is directly subordinated. As a municipal division, the town of Yukhnov is incorporated within Yukhnovsky Municipal District as Yukhnov Urban Settlement.

== Notable people ==
- Mikhail Yanshin
- Valentin Koptyug
- Mikhail Rusakov
