= Mikhail Rusakov =

Mikhail Petrovich Rusakov
- Михаил Петрович Русаков
- Born: 20 November [O.S. 8 November] 1892; Yukhnov, Smolensk Governorate, Russian Empire
- Died: October 24, 1963 (aged 70); Moscow, Russian SFSR, Soviet Union
- Resting place: Novodevichy Cemetery
- Citizenship: Russian Empire; Soviet Union

Mikhail Petrovich Rusakov (Russian: Михаил Петрович Русаков, 20 November [O.S. 8 November] 1892 in Yukhnov – 24 October 1963 in Moscow) was a Soviet geologist, academician of the Kazakhstan Academy of Sciences, Honored Worker of Science and Technology of the Kazakh Soviet Socialist Republic.

He graduated from high school with a gold medal. In 1911, he entered the Geological Department of the Petrograd Mining Institute, from which he graduated in 1921.

He worked in the Ural-Siberian Division of the Geological Committee, and then in the geological department of the Kazakh branch of the Academy of Sciences of the USSR.

His main works are devoted to the study of geology and ore deposits of Kazakhstan.

Rusakov discovered the following mining fields: Kounrad (copper), Semizbugskoe (corundum, andalusite) Karagaylinskoye (lead, barite), Kairaktinsky (asbestos, barite, base metals) and other mineral deposits.

On 30 May 1949 Rusakov was arrested by the NKVD as a part of falsified "Krasnoyarsk Case". By an extrajudicial decision of the Special Council of the NKVD he was sentenced to 25 years of labor camps. He worked in a sharashka OTB-1 in Krasnoyarsk. He was freed and rehabilitated on 20 March 1954

Mineral Rusakovite, water ferrovanadate Fe5 [VO4] 2 (OH) 9 • 3H2O is named after Mikhail Rusakov.

There is a monument to Rusakov in the city of Balkhash erected in 1992 to commemorate the centenary of the scientist and a school and a street of the city is named after him.
