= Dmitry Mushketov =

Soviet geologist and paleontologist

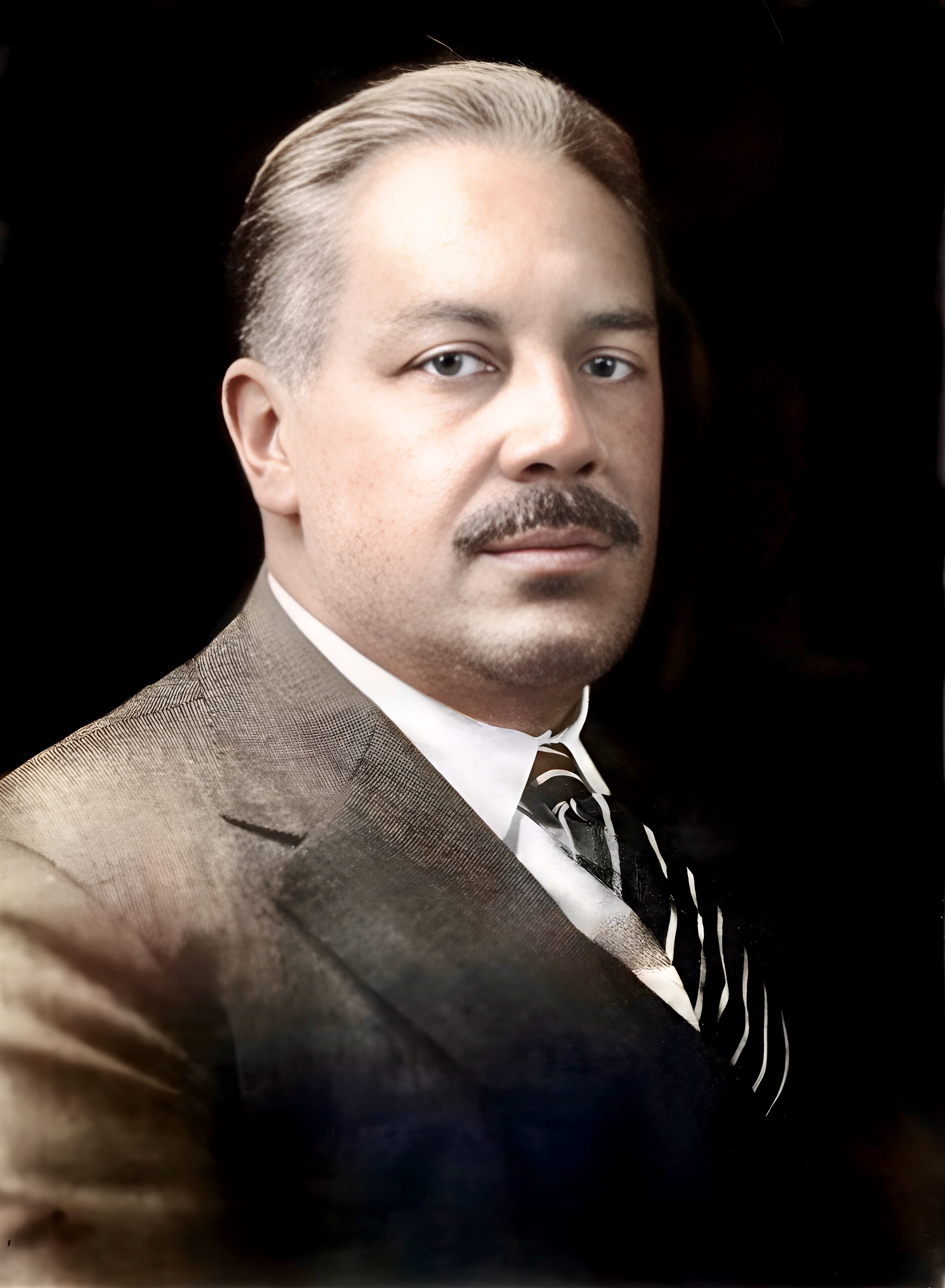
- 1920th
- Born: March 31, 1882
- Died: February 18, 1938 (aged 55)
- Known for: First INQUA president
- Scientific career
- Fields: Geology
- Workplaces: Saint Petersburg Mining Institute

Dmitry Ivanovich Mushketov (Russian: Дми́трий Ива́нович Мушкетов; 31 March [O.S. 19 March] 1882 – 18 February 1938) was a Russian and Soviet geologist and paleontologist. He was one of the victims of the Great Terror.

== Biography ==
Dmitry Mushketov was born in Saint Petersburg to the family of Ivan Vasilyevich Mushketov, a famous explorer and professor at the Mining Institute, and Ekaterina Pavlovna Mushketova.

His early education by his mother gave him a fluency in German, French, and English, which allowed him later in life to travel to Western Europe, to correspond with foreign specialists, and to represent Soviet geology abroad. He entered the Mining Institute in 1899 and graduated with honours in 1907.

In 1905 he was awarded Minor Silver Medal of the Russian Geographical Society.

He attained Master of Science degree in 1915 and awarded honorary Doctorate in Geology and Mineralogy from the Mining Institute, 1936.

D. I. Mushketov's geological interests were very wide including the worldwide study of tectonics and seismology, but he concentrated his work in Central Asia, covering also the fields of stratigraphy, geomorphology, glaciers, and mineral resources. His scholarly output was prodigious, with "more than 50 scientific works, several textbooks and manuals included, before 1926". Between 1909 and 1916 he carried out the geological survey of eastern Fergana which contributed to the geological map of Central Asia. His name is particularly well known for the high-quality revisions and additions that he made to each edition of the textbook on physical geology that was originally written by his father (published in 1888–91).

In 1918 he was appointed director of the Mining Institute and was director of the Geological Committee in 1926–1929.

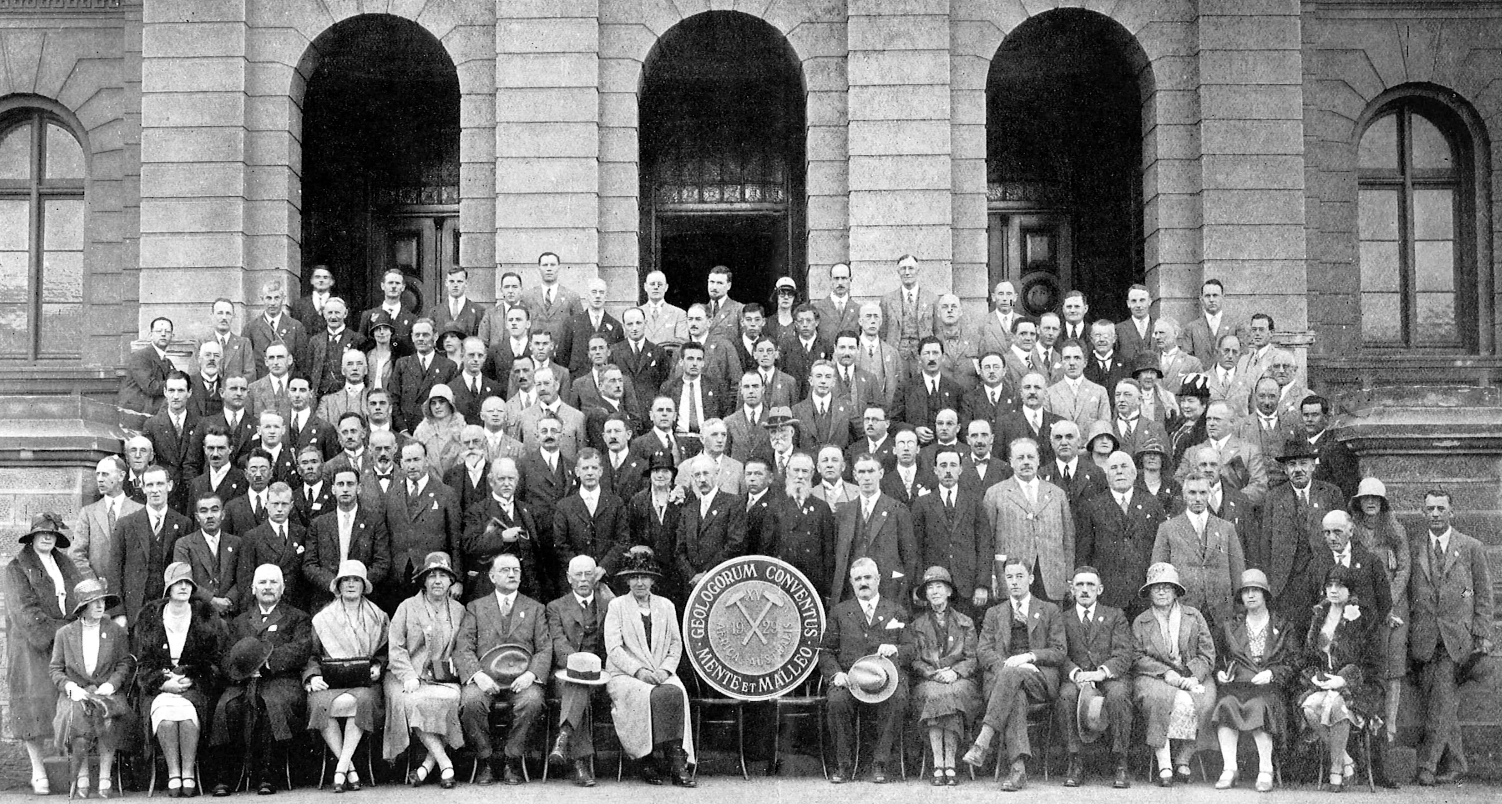
Dmitry Mushketov on 15th International Geological Congress, 1929

He participated in International Geological Congress abroad in 1922 (XIII, Belgium), 1926 (XIV, Spain), and 1929 (XV, South Africa). In addition, he was entrusted with making a bid for the International Geological Congress (XVI) to take place in the USSR in 1933 and was Chairman of the Organizing Committee for the Third All-Russia Geological Congress in Tashkent, 1928.

=== Repression ===
In 1933 he was forbidden to attend the International Geological Congress (XVI, USA), 1933. The Soviet delegation to the congress was led instead by Ivan Gubkin.

On June 29, 1937, Mushketov was arrested upon a falsified accusation, a month before the International Geological Congress (XVII, Moscow, July 21, 1937). In response to an official request for information filed by the Commission on Geological Study of the USSR March 29, 1962, the following information was provided by the Military Board of the USSR Supreme Court, May 31, 1962:

D. I. Mushketov was sentenced to death and executed on February 18, 1938. He was fully exonerated (rehabilitated), posthumously, on December 8, 1956.

Several colleagues were executed on the same day in Leningrad: Nikolay Bobkov, Vsevolod Cherkesov, and G. N. Frederiks.
