= Kasimir Petrovich Kalitsky =

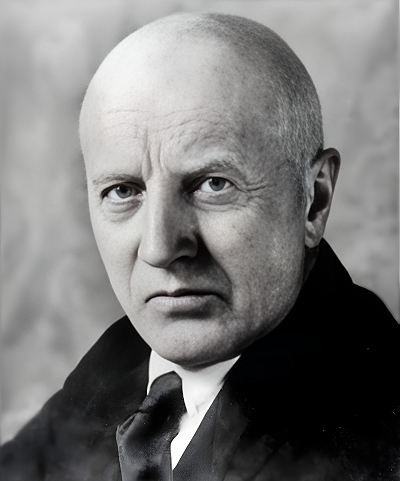
- Born: 16 March 1873; Saint Petersburg
- Died: 28 December 1941 (aged 68); Leningrad
- Education: Saint Petersburg Mining Institute
- Known for: Oil exploration. Theories of the origin of oil
- Scientific career
- Fields: Petroleum geology, Stratigraphy
- Workplaces: Geological Committee of Russia, Oil Institute

Kasimir Petrovich Kalitsky (Rus. Казимир Петрович Калицкий; Kazimir Kalickij; 1873–1941) — Russian oil geologist (Petroleum geology), made a significant contribution to the study of oil regions of the Caucasus, Pre-Caspian, Transcaspian, Volga regions and Central Asia. Geological descriptions and maps compiled by him are still relevant to this day. Kalitsky's theories about the processes of oil formation and accumulation had a great influence on the study and exploration of hidden oil deposits. His ideas on the origin and migration of petroleum are crucial for the history of geology.

== Biography ==
Kalitsky was born on March 16 1873 in Saint Petersburg into a family of doctors.

He was brought up and studied in a German orphanage and school in St. Petersburg.

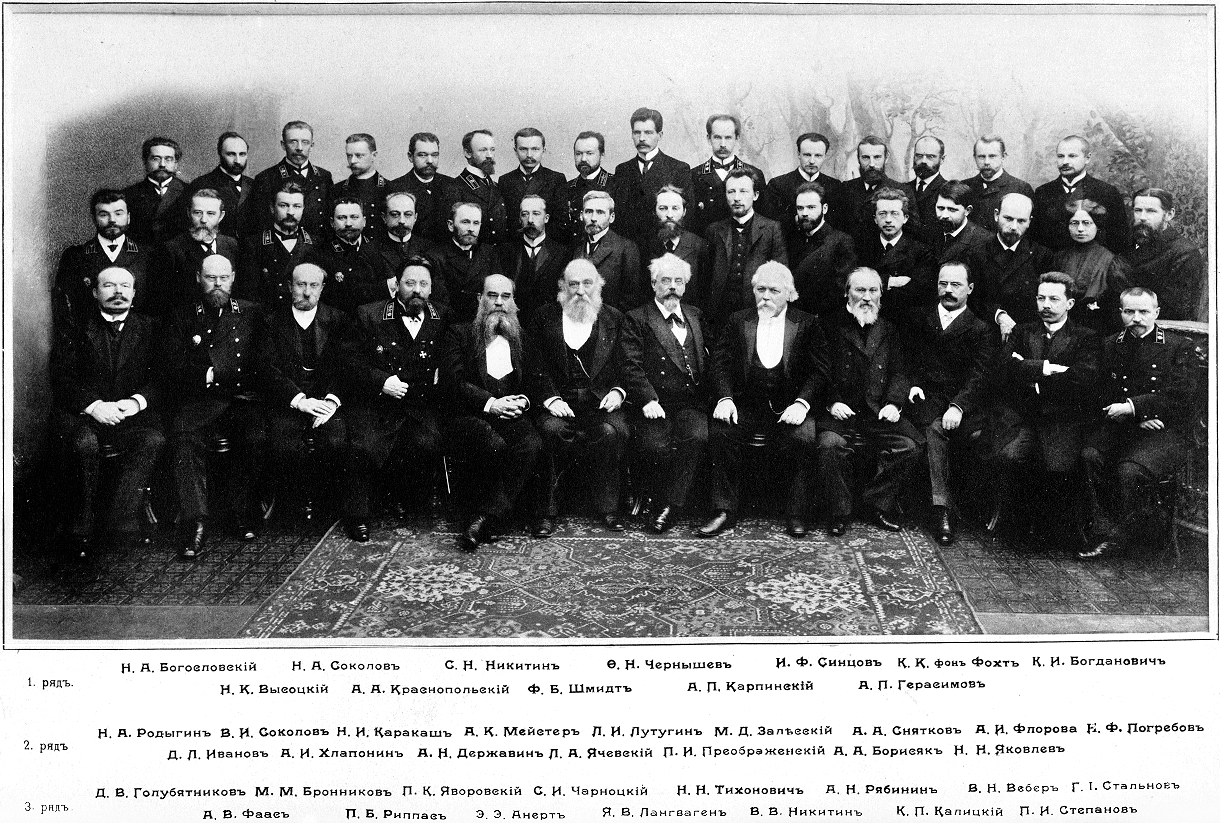
Geological Committee member, 1907

In 1899 he graduated from the Mining Institute in St. Petersburg. He started science work under the new program of the Geological Committee for systematic studies of petroliferous areas of imperial Russia (1901). He was a mining engineer on expeditions for geological surveying, then he was elected as a full-time geologist. He became the first head of the Oil Section of the Geological Committee (1920-1925, 1926-1928). He held high positions in the established Petroleum Geological Prospecting Institute and consulted at oil producing enterprises in the Caucasus and Central Asia.

He was the author of books on the theory and practice of oil prospecting, among them: On the migration of oil (1911), In what phase of the geological cycle does the formation of oil deposits occur? (1916), Oil-producing formations (1934), Origin of oil from plant remains of sea communities (1937), Facial features of shoe-string oil deposits (1939), Algal remains as a possible source material for the formation of oil (1940). Based on his extensive experience, he gave the first lecture course in Russia on petroleum geology at the Mining Institute (1921–1923) and published a university textbook. This introduced many students to oil exploration.

He developed a method of using structural geological map for oil exploration. He made his own theory of the origin of oil in detail.

He died of illness on December 28, 1941 in Leningrad.

== Memory and discussion of Kalitsky's theories ==
The tragic death of Kalitsky during the Siege of Leningrad at the end of 1941, and the recognition of his merits prompted the Petroleum Institute to publish with a positive review his unifying monograph Scientific foundations of oil exploration (1944). In addition, the Institute asked his wife and colleague Vera Kalitskaya (1882–1951) to write a book about his life and scientific works. She had literary talent, had worked with Kalitsky since 1914 at the Geological Committee, participated in his expeditions and interviewed his colleagues. The book is full of biographical details, based on memories, documents, letters and analysis of publications.

However, in the late 1940s, the Cold War began and the Soviet ideological struggle affected scientific theories, among which it was necessary to choose the only “correct” one. In petroleum geology, these were the views of Ivan Gubkin (1871-1939). Kalitsky's theories on the origin and migration of oil began to be actively denied. In addition, the book talks about joint work and meetings with geologists who went into exile or were repressed in Stalin’s time. And among the presented letters, a meeting in the USA (1927) between Kalitsky and American geneticists, including Thomas Hunt Morgan (1866–1945), was described. Morgan became the main ideological enemy during the Lysenkoism time in the USSR (Soviet neo-Lamarckism 1948-65). For these reasons, a book about him could not be published.

Only in 1958, was it possible to add an article about Kalitsky’s achievements to the additional Vol. 51 of the Great Soviet Encyclopedia. He was listed as one of the discoverers of important oil fields, the author of the original hypothesis of the origin of oil, and the founder of new directions in petroleum geology. The memory of the scientist was restored in 1973 in the All-Union Petroleum Research Geological Prospecting Institute (VNIGRI), in the meeting dedicated to the 100th anniversary of his birth, and later in publications dedicated to the 80th anniversary of the institute (2009). Kalitsky’s large oil field discovery near Makhachkala city, during his 1923-26 expeditions, became an important supply of oil during World War II, starting in 1941.

Kalitsky’s hypotheses are especially interesting for the history of science, as an example of the creative development of original theories, based on the collection of data and analysis of numerous facts at the intersections of sciences.

Named in honor of K. P. Kalitsky:

- Kalitsky Peak at the foot of Mount Elbrus, Caucasus (height 3581 m.)
- Several new species of extinct fossil organisms.

== Links ==
- Galkin A. I. Kasimir Petrovich Kalitsky. Biography and Bibliography on http://higeo.ginras.ru/view-record.php?tbl=person&id=482
- Казимир Петрович Калицкий: жизнь и труды (1873-1941). Book preprint on https://preprints.ru/article/1511
- Вклад К.П. Калицкого в нефтяную геологию юга России. 2023.
