= Ilya Malyshev =

Soviet geologist

- Илья Малышев

Chairman of the State Commission for Mineral Reserves of the Council of Ministers of the USSR
- In office December 1957 – August 1971

1st Minister of Geology of the USSR
- In office 14 June 1946 – 11 April 1949
- Preceded by: Position established
- Succeeded by: Pyotr Andreevich Zakharov

2nd Chairman of the Committee for Geological Affairs under the Council of People's Commissars of the USSR
- In office July 1939 – 14 June 1946
- Preceded by: Ivan Mikhailovich Gubkin
- Succeeded by: Position abolished

Personal details
- Born: 1 August 1904; Maykor, Russian Empire
- Died: 23 April 1973 (aged 68); Moscow, Russian SFSR, Soviet Union
- Resting place: Novodevichy Cemetery, Moscow
- Political party: Communist Party of the Soviet Union

Awards

Ilya Ilyich Malyshev (Russian: Илья Ильич Малышев; 1 August 1904 – 23 April 1973) was a Soviet geologist who was Minister of Geology of the USSR from 1946 to 1949.

== Biography ==
In 1930, he graduated from the Ural Mining Institute with a degree in mining engineering and exploration geology.

From 1930 to 1932, he worked as deputy director of the Ural branch of the Institute of Applied Mineralogy in the city of Sverdlovsk.

Malyshev became a member of the Communist Party of the Soviet Union in 1932. From 1932 to 1935, he was a graduate student at the USSR Academy of Sciences in Leningrad and Moscow. From 1935 to 1937 he was a senior researcher at the USSR Academy of Sciences.

From 1937 to 1939, he was the Deputy Head of the Main Geological Directorate of the People's Commissariat of Heavy Industry of the USSR.

From 1939 to 1946, he was the Chairman of the Committee for Geological Affairs of the USSR, and Minister of Geology of the USSR, he was removed from this position in connection with the Krasnoyarsk Affair.

From 1949 to 1952, he was the head of the North-Western Geological Directorate of the USSR Ministry of Geology in Petrozavodsk.

From 1952 to 1957, he worked at the All-Union Scientific Research Institute of Mineral Raw Materials as senior researcher and head of the titanium sector.

From 1957 to 1971, he was the Chairman of the State Commission for Mineral Reserves under the Council of Ministers of the USSR.

Earned a Doctor of Geological and Mineralogical Sciences in 1958.

He was buried in Moscow at the Novodevichy Cemetery. In 2006, a new mineral, Malyshevite, was named in his honor.

== Awards ==
- Order of Lenin
- Order of the October Revolution
- Order of the Red Banner of Labor (three times).
