= Geolkom Trial =

Soviet trial against geologists from the Geological Committee (1928–1929)

The Geolkom Trial (Russian: Дело Геолкома) was a 1928–1929 fabricated trial of the alleged "counter-revolutionary organization within the Geological Committee", which, as the OGPU claimed, "sought to use the rich statistical and intelligence data available to the Geological Committee to distort the economic policy of the Soviet government in the field of mining and the mining industry and thereby contribute to the restoration of the bourgeois-capitalist system in the USSR".

The Geolkom Trial was part of the series of political cases directed against "old" specialists and scientists: the Shakhty Trial (1928), "On Sabotage in the Gold and Platinum Industry" (1929), "On Sabotage in the Oil Industry" (1929–1931), the Industrial Party Trial (1930), the Academic Trial (1930–1931), "On Sabotage and Espionage Activities of Counterrevolutionary Groups in the Geological Industry" (1930–1932).

During the trial, 32 persons were investigated, of which 16 persons were sentenced, including Ilya Ginszburg, (Note: Ilya Ginszburg was sentenced to death, replaced with 10 years of imprisonment, worked in Ukhta expedition, released in 1934, exonerated on 27 July 1936) Mikhail Dzhakson (Джаксон Михаил Николаевич), (Note: Mikhail Dzhakson belonged to Russian nobility, graduated as a lawyer from the St. Peterburg University. He was in charge of statistics department of Geolkom. Received death sentence, replaced with 10 years of imprisonment. As of 1931 he was in Svirlag. While being a prisoner, he served in a geological bureau in Murmansk.) Grigory Kuzbasov, (Note: Кузбасов Григорий Александрович was a student working for Geolkom. Sentenced for 5 years and sent to the Ukhta expedition.) Dmitry Ortenberg, (Note: Dmitry Ortenberg was head of the Moscow office of Geolkom. He was sentenced for 3 years of exile in Siberia. In 1931 he was moved to Kazakhstan, released in January 1932.) Н. И. Сафронов, Н. Н. Тихонович, М. Л. Трофимюк и А. Н. Флёров.

Much more geologists were repressed in the Soviet Union. The book Репрессированные геологи [Repressed Geologists] contains about 1,000 biographical sketches compiled from various sources.

== See also ==
- Krasnoyarsk Geologists' Affair (1949–1950)
