= Valeri Malyshev =

Valeri Malyshev may refer to:

- Valeri Aleksandrovich Malyshev, Soviet actor who played in the movie Dead Souls
- Valeri Malyshev (politician), former vice-governor of Saint Petersburg
- Valeri Mikhailovich Malyshev (b. 1980), Russian footballer
