= Yury Malyshev =

Yury Malyshev, or Yuri Malyshev, may refer to:

- Yury Malyshev (cosmonaut) (1941–1999), Soviet cosmonaut
- Yury Malyshev (rower) (born 1947), Soviet Olympic rower
- Yury Malyshev (speed skater) (born 1933), Soviet Olympic speed skater
