= Yevgeny Kozlovsky =

Russian geologist and politician (1929–2022)

- Евгений Козловский
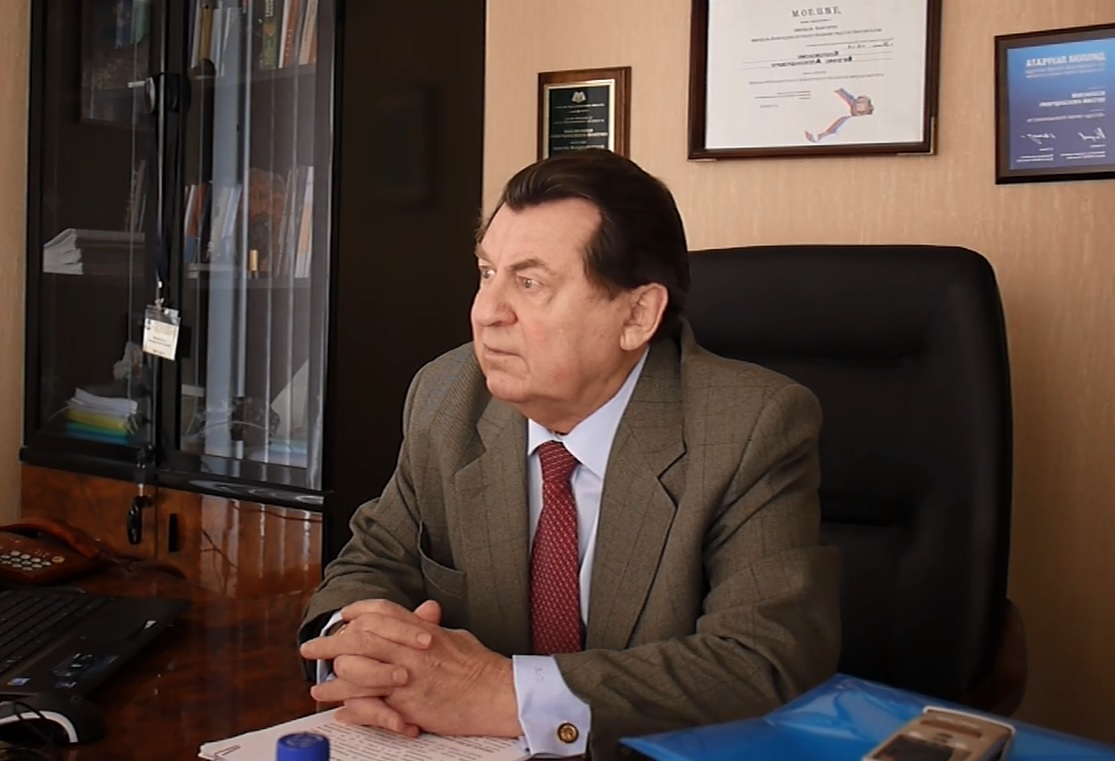
- Kozlovsky in 2014

Minister of Geology of the Soviet Union
- In office 29 December 1975 – 7 June 1989
- Preceded by: Alexander Sidorenko
- Succeeded by: Grigori Gabrielyants

Personal details
- Born: Yevgeny Aleksandrovich Kozlovsky; 7 May 1929 Dovsk, Byelorussian SSR, Soviet Union
- Died: 20 February 2022 (aged 92) Moscow, Russia
- Party: CPSU
- Education: Russian State Geological Prospecting University
- Occupation: Geologist
- Yevgeny Kozlovsky's voice Recorded on 25 April 2013

Yevgeny Aleksandrovich Kozlovsky (Russian: Евге́ний Алекса́ндрович Козло́вский; 7 May 1929 – 20 February 2022) was a Soviet and Russian politician. A member of the Communist Party of the Soviet Union, he served as Minister of Geology from 1975 to 1989.

Kozlovsky died on 20 February 2022, at the age of 92.
