= Ministry of Geology =

Government ministry of the Soviet Union

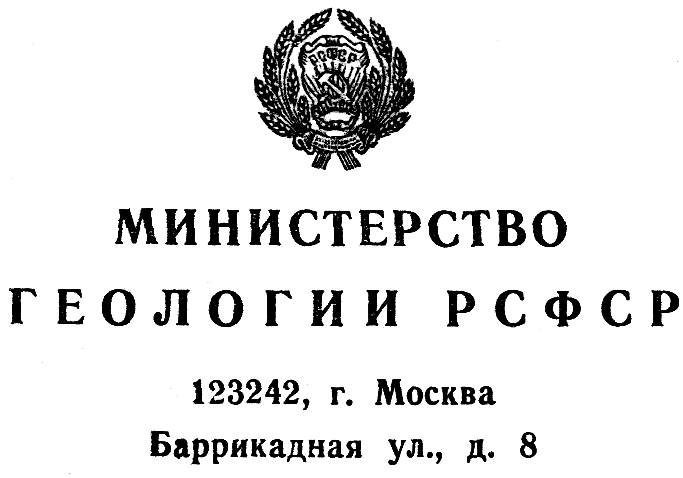
Ministry of Geology of the RSFSR

The Ministry of Geology (Mingeo; Russian: Министерство геологии СССР) was a government ministry in the Soviet Union.

Established as Committee for Geology in 1939; renamed Ministry of Geology in 1946; responsible for the exploration and surveying of the geological resources of the USSR, the expansion of proven mineral reserves, and the development of new technology. In September 1987 the Ministry changed from union-republic ministry to all-union ministry.

The Ministry of Geology was dissolved on 1 December 1991 and replaced by the Ministry of Ecology and Natural Resources of the Russian SFSR.

== List of ministers ==
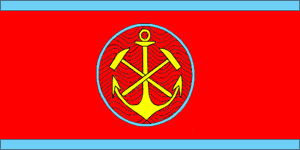
Flag of the Minister of Geology, approved in 1983

- Ilya Malyshev (14.6.1946 - 11.4.1949)
- Pyotr Zakharov (11.4.1949 - 15.3.1953)
- Pyotr Antropov (31.8.1953 - 24.2.1962)
- Aleksandr Sidorenko (27.2.1962 - 29.12.1975)
- Yevgeny Kozlovsky (29.12.1975 - 17.7.1989)
- Grigory Gabrielyants (17.7.1989 - 24.8.1991)
