= Maykor, Perm Krai =

Maykor Майкор
- Settlement
- Location within Perm Krai Location within Russia
- Coordinates: 59°00′N 55°52′E
- Country: Russia
- Region: Perm Krai
- District: Yusvinsky District
- Time zone: UTC+5:00

Maykor (Russian: Майкор) is a rural locality (a settlement) and the administrative center of Maykorskoye Rural Settlement, Yusvinsky District, Perm Krai, Russia. The population was 2,756 as of 2010. There are 47 streets.

== Geography ==
Maykor is located 59 km east of Yusva (the district's administrative centre) by road. Gorki is the nearest rural locality.
