= Misha Malyshev =

Russian/American financial trader

- Born: Mikhail Malyshev; Shuya, Russia
- Education: Moscow Institute of Physics and Technology, Princeton University
- Occupations: Trader (finance), CEO of Teza Technologies

Mikhail “Misha” Malyshev is a Russian/American financial trader and business executive who is the founder and CEO of Teza Group, a quantitative trading firm based in Chicago, Illinois.

== Education ==
Misha Malyshev attended the Moscow Institute of Physics and Technology, earning a B.S. in physics and an M.S. in Theoretical Physics. After coming to the United States, Malyshev earned a Ph.D. from Princeton University in Astrophysics in 1998.

== Career ==
Malyshev began his career in 1998 at Bell Laboratories conducting research until 2000. He spent the next three years as a consultant with McKinsey & Company. In 2003, he joined Citadel Investment Group and developed a quantitative trading business within the Quantitative Analytics group. He was appointed to the position of Managing Director and Global Head of High Frequency Trading; under his direction, the group made $1 billion in 2008. He resigned in 2009 and started his own firm. The move prompted Citadel to file a lawsuit in which Malyshev was required to pay a fine.

Malyshev founded Teza Group and its affiliate Teza Technologies in 2009. He is CEO of the firm. He would later establish Teza Capital Management LLC, a registered investment advisor.

Malyshev has also been a contributing author to Smart Business Chicago.

== Philanthropy ==
Malyshev is a donor and sponsor for the Adler Planetarium. He is on the board of directors of After-School All-Stars and is on the advisory board of After School Matters. He is a member of the global leadership council for buildOn, where he has contributed money to fund the building of schools in developing countries.
