= Sergey Malyshev =

Sergey Malyshev may refer to:

- Sergey Malyshev (sport shooter), Russian sport shooter
- Sergey Malyshev (ice skater), Russian ice skater
