= Jan Kalicki =

Polish mathematician

- Born: January 28, 1922; Warsaw, Poland
- Died: November 25, 1953 (aged 31); Contra Costa County, USA
- Citizenship: Polish
- Education: Warsaw University,
- Spouse: Mireya Jaimes-Freyre
- Scientific career
- Fields: Mathematician

Jan Kalicki (28 January 1922 – 25 November 1953) was a Polish mathematician who investigated logical matrices.

== Biography and education ==
Jan Kalicki graduated from high school in Warsaw in May 1939 just months before Germany invaded Poland on 1 September. He wanted to go to the University of Warsaw but it was closed down on 27 September when Poland surrendered.

Famous mathematicians present at the University of Warsaw such as Borsuk, Łukasiewicz, Mazurkiewicz, Sierpiński, Mostowski, and Kuratowski opened up an underground University of Warsaw. This was repressed by the Nazis who wanted to stop all intellectual efforts and they imprisoned or killed several. Nevertheless, Kalicki completed his studies in mathematics and philosophy at this underground university but it would have to wait until the end of the war in 1945 before he would be awarded an MA in mathematics and philosophy.

He taught for two years after the war at the Universities of Łódź and University of Warsaw he went to London on a British Council Scholarship for two years. There, Kalicki received his doctorate in mathematical logic in July 1948 at the University of London. While studying in London he married Mireya Jaimes-Freyre in 1947 and had a son named after his father.

Feeling that going back to Poland at this time would be restrictive he decided to stay in London and lectured in mathematics at Woolwich Polytechnic. A year later he went to University of Leeds and stayed there until 1951 when he went to the US to become Visiting Assistant Professor of Mathematics in the University of California, Berkeley.

== Later life and death ==
In 1953, just after a year he was appointed Assistant Professor of Mathematics at the Davis campus he returned to Berkeley, to become Assistant Professor of Philosophy. He died three months later in a car accident north of Berkeley, California. A tribute published by the University of California emphasized that he was beloved by colleagues and students alike.

== Works ==
Kalicki published 13 papers on logical matrices and equational logic in the five years before his death.
