= Yukhnovsky District =

Yukhnovsky District Юхновский район (Russian)
- District
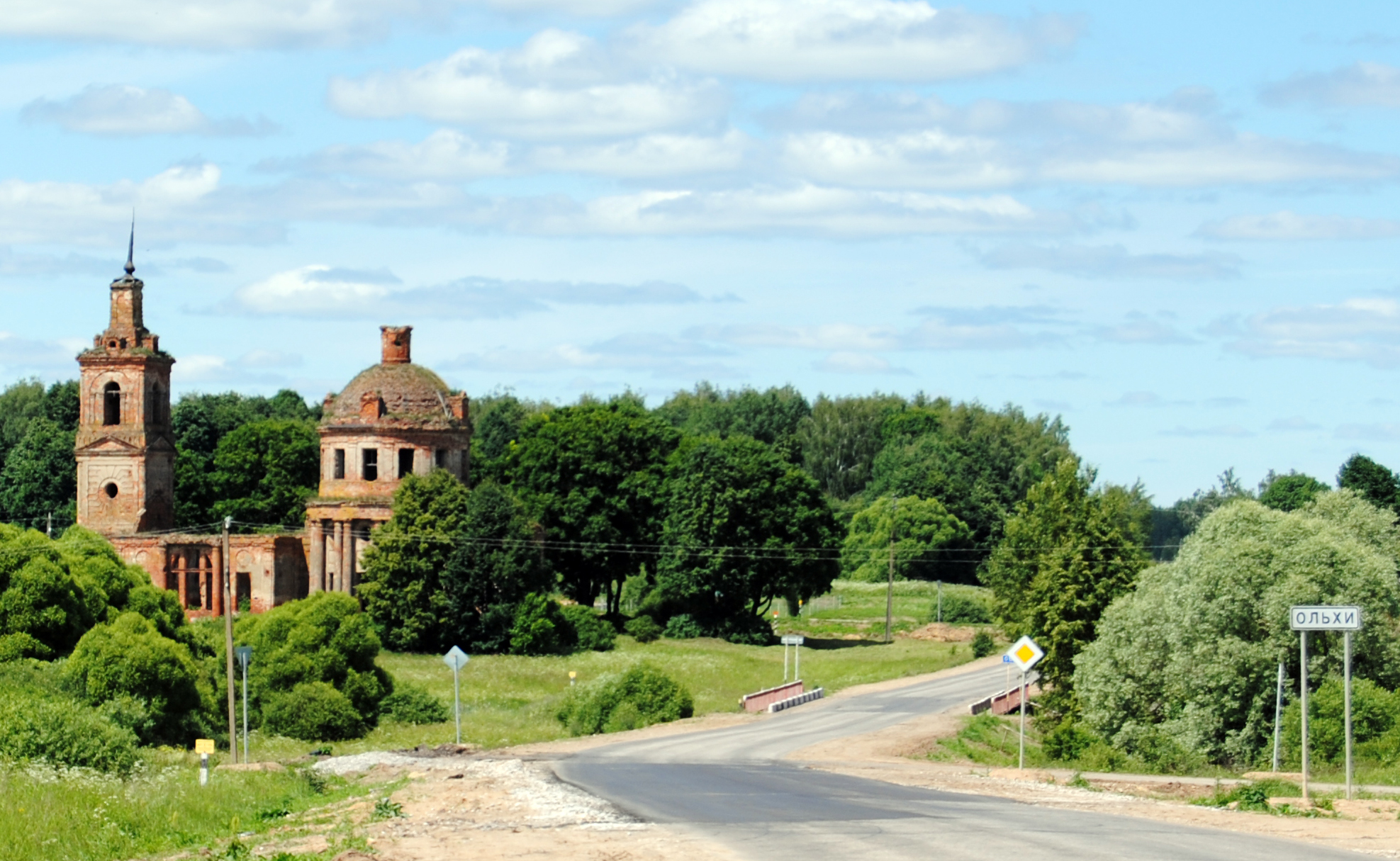
- Church of St. Nicholas: Alder, Yukhnovsky District

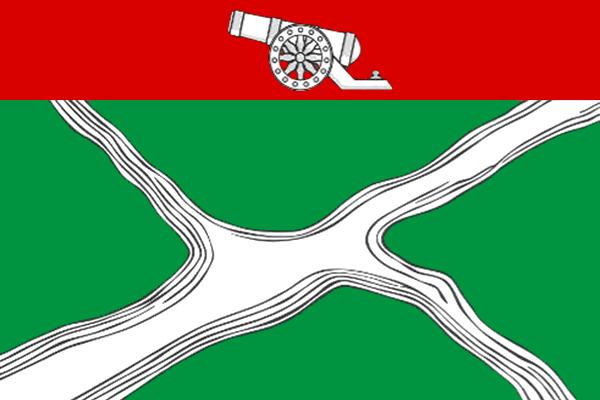
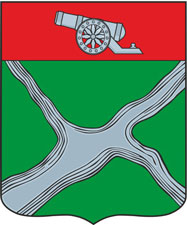
- Flag Coat of arms
- Location of Yukhnovsky District in Kaluga Oblast
- Coordinates: 54°45′N 35°14′E
- Country: Russia
- Federal subject: Kaluga Oblast
- Established: 1 October 1929
- Administrative center: Yukhnov

Area
  - Total: 1,332.5 km^{2} (514.5 sq mi)

Population (2010 Census)
  - Total: 12,696
  - Density: 9.5280/km^{2} (24.677/sq mi)
  - Urban: 55.6%
  - Rural: 44.4%

Administrative structure
  - Inhabited localities: 1 cities/towns, 135 rural localities

Municipal structure
  - Municipally incorporated as: Yukhnovsky Municipal District
  - Municipal divisions: 1 urban settlements, 13 rural settlements
- Time zone: UTC+3 (MSK)
- OKTMO ID: 29650000
- Website: http://uhnov.ru/

Yukhnovsky District (Russian: Юхновский райо́н) is an administrative and municipal district (raion), one of the twenty-four in Kaluga Oblast, Russia. It is located in the northwest of the oblast. The area of the district is 1,332.5 square kilometers (514.5 sq mi). Its administrative center is the town of Yukhnov. Population: 12,912 (2021 census); 12,696 (2010 census); 14,447 (2002 Census); 13,749 (1989 Soviet census). The population of Yukhnov accounts for 51.2% of the district's total population.
