= Geological Committee =

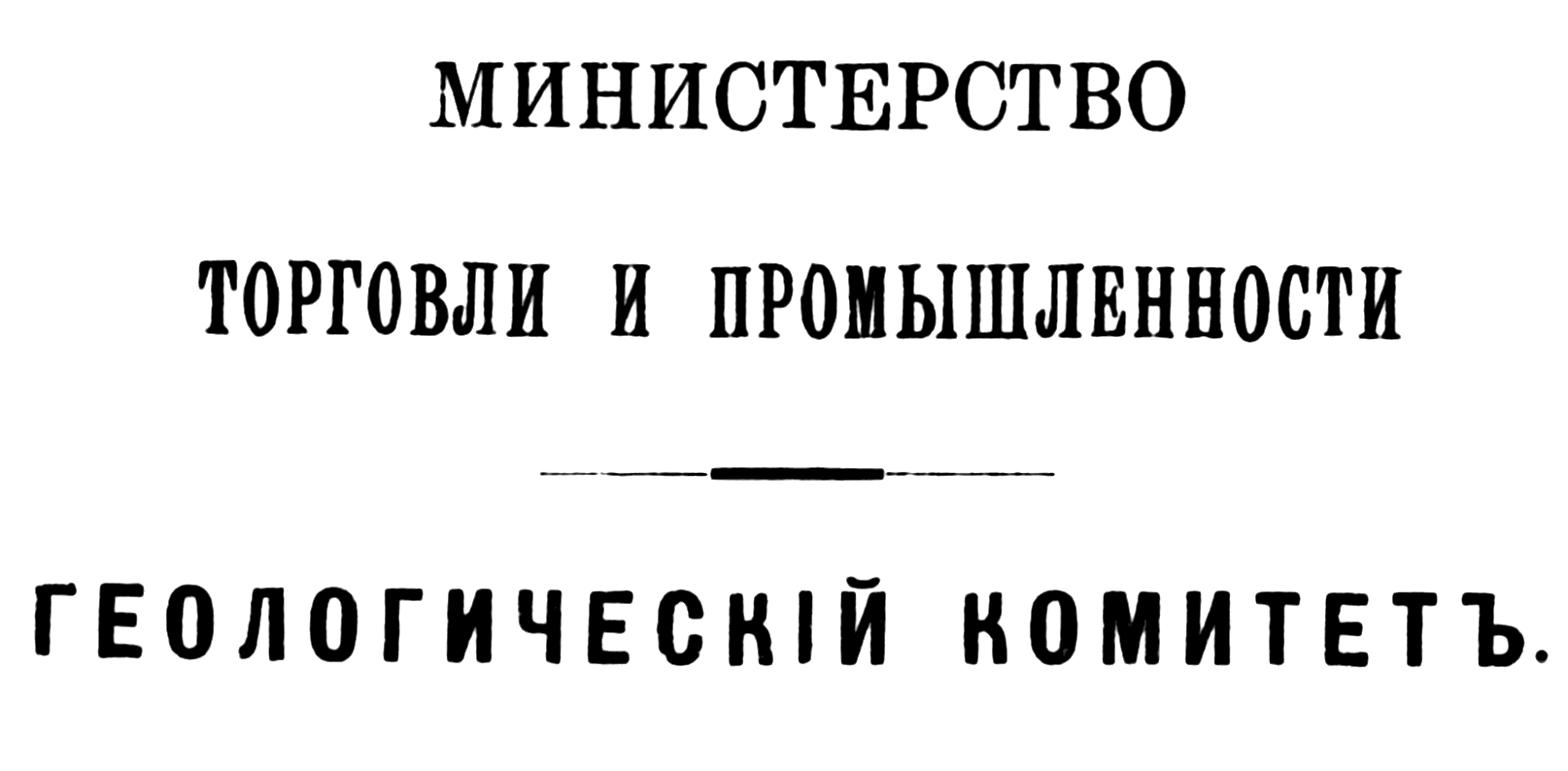

Agency overview
- Formed: 1882
- Jurisdiction: Russia, USSR
- Headquarters: Saint Petersburg

The Geological Committee (Geolkom) was the main state geological institution in charge of the geological survey in the Russian Empire and the Soviet Union (1882–1930).

- 1882 – Established in Saint Petersburg for the systematic and comprehensive study of the subsoil of the Russian Empire and the compilation of [geological maps.
- 1912 – Geological Committee of the Ministry of Trade and Industry.
- 1918 – Geological Committee of the VSNKh
- 1930 – Abolished in January 1930.

== History ==
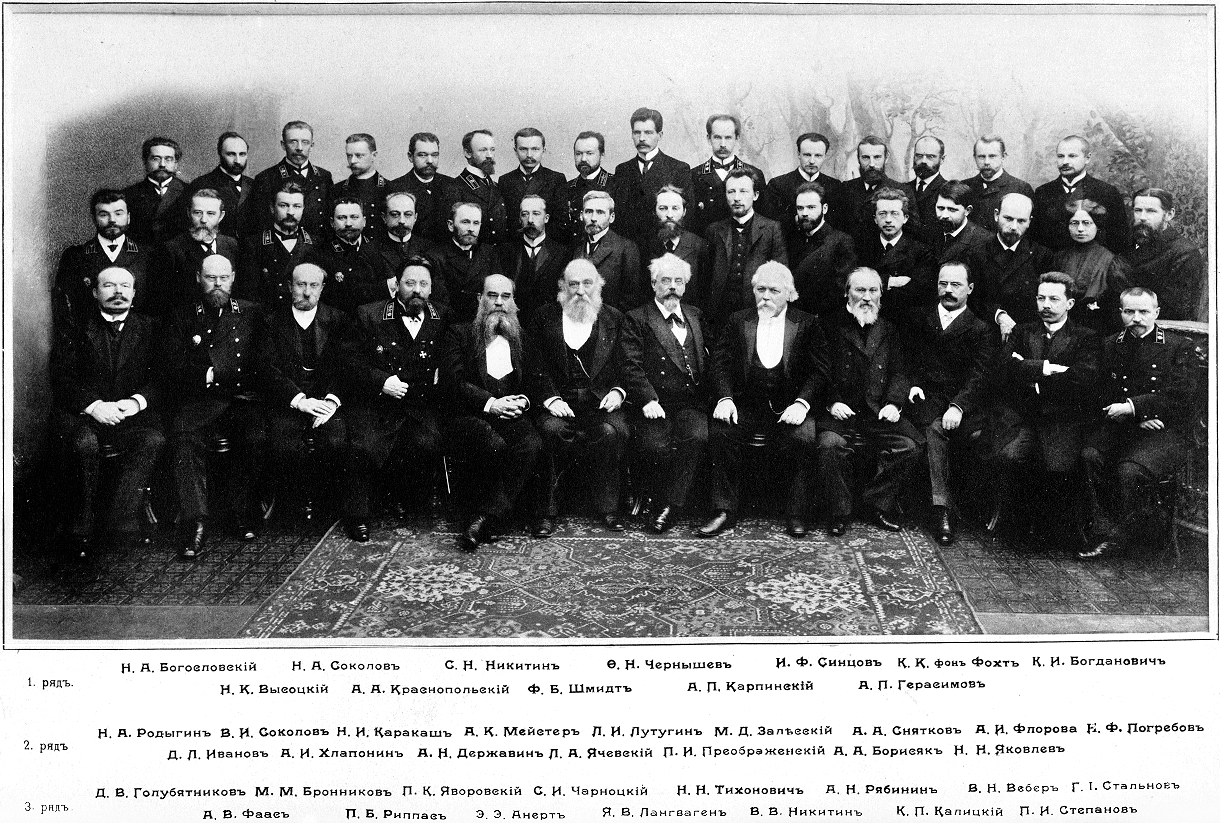
The Geological Committee in 1907

The Geological Committee was created on 19 [O.S. 1882] January by a decree of Emperor Alexander III within the Mining Department of the Ministry of State Property.

The tasks of the Geolkom included the systematic study of the geological structure of the country and the mineral wealth of its subsoil, conducting regional geological mapping, and later, the systematic description of the geological structure of the territory of the Russian Empire.

In 1912, Nicholas II approved the Law "On the Establishment of the Regulations on the Geological Committee and the Staff of this Committee," which had been approved by the State Council and the State Duma. It essentially retained, without change, the main foundations upon which the Regulations on the Geological Committee of 1882 and 1897 were built.

In 1914, it was part of the Ministry of Trade and Industry of the Russian Empire.

=== Soviet reorganization ===
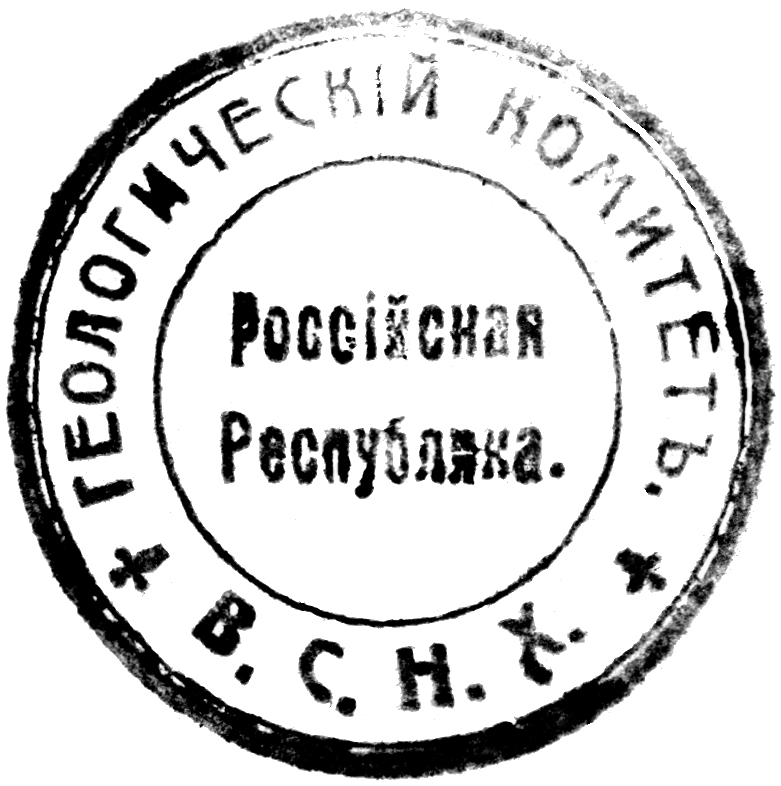
The Geological Committee, after 1918

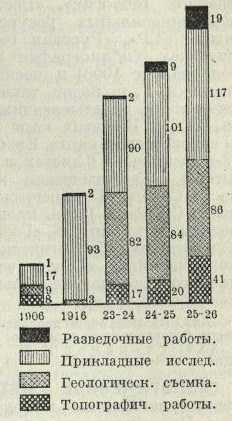
Growth of the Geolkom's work

After the revolutions of 1917, the activity of the Geolkom expanded. It became the "central geological institution of the USSR".

In March 1918, the committee was transferred to the Supreme Council of the National Economy (VSNKh), and from 1923, its tasks included: organizing, implementing, and regulating all geological and exploration works of national significance. Branches were created (Moscow, Ukrainian, Siberian, Ural, Central Asian, North Caucasian) and bureaus (e.g., Transcaucasian).

In 1923, the management "Tsentropromrazvedka" (Central Industrial Exploration), which was under the Mining Department of the VSNKh, was introduced into the structure of the Geolkom. From this time, the tasks of the Geolkom included not only geological mapping and coordination of scientific research of a geological profile but also the exploration of mineral resources.

Structure of the Geological Committee in 1924:

Directorate	Administrative Office Financial and Supply Department Museum Laboratory Councils Scientific Administrative and Economic – Bureaus Bibliographic Topographic Publications – Sections Paleontological Petrographic Oil Coal Metallic Non-Metallic Minerals Gold and Platinum Hydrogeological – Departments Regional Geology Applied Geology and Exploration	Regional Sections Exploration Bureau Accounting Bureau Branches Moscow Ukrainian, Siberian, Far Eastern North Caucasian, Transcaucasian, Ural, Turkestan

In March 1926, by order of the Chairman of the VSNKh (then F. E. Dzerzhinsky), the elective system for forming the governing bodies (including the director) of the Geolkom was abolished, while the powers of the Scientific Council of the Geolkom were narrowed. Thus, in addition to a sharp expansion of activity and staff numbers, the organizational structure of the Geolkom was gradually changing in accordance with the development of the state structures of the USSR.

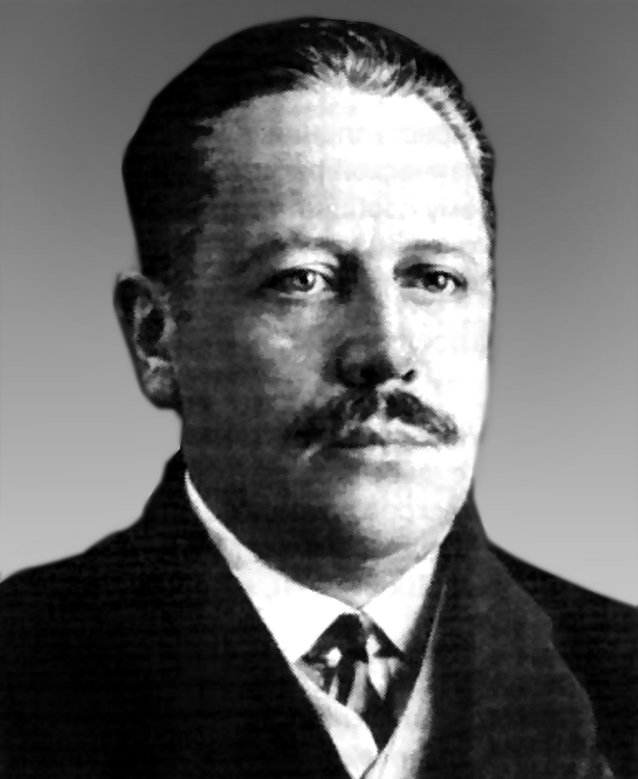
D. I. Mushketov, the last head of the Geolkom

On 20 April 1926, Professor and Rector of the Mining Institute D. I. Mushketov was appointed Chairman of the Geolkom. His deputy was appointed I. M. Gubkin, and his assistants were A. K. Meistner, V. K. Kotulsky and N. N. Tikhonovich.

In 1927, by order of the VSNKh of the USSR, the Geological Committee was entrusted with determining the provision of newly constructed enterprises for capital construction with reserves of mineral raw materials. In the same year, in execution of Order No. 881 of the VSNKh of the USSR, the Geological Committee formed the Commission for Calculating Mineral Reserves "to give uniformity and authority to all reserve figures originating from the Geological Committee". The first meeting of the "Commission" (minutes No. 1) took place on 31 May 1927, which is considered the birth date of the currently existing State Commission on Mineral Reserves (GKZ).

=== Liquidation ===
On 25 October 1928, a decision was made to reorganize the Geolkom, which, on the one hand, prescribed the decentralization of the management of geological exploration and geological survey work locally, and on the other, the separation of research and administrative functions. This was part of the authorities' plan to crush the old science.

In January 1929, I. I. Radchenko (a professional revolutionary, delegate to the 1st Congress of the RSDLP, deputy chairman and member of the presidium of the VSNKh) was appointed director of the Geolkom for the "reconstruction" period, who resigned his powers in January 1930 along with the liquidation of the Geolkom.

In January 1930, the Geolkom was abolished. The functions of coordination and planning of geological exploration work were transferred to the Main Geological Survey Directorate in Moscow (GGRU), and the branches were transformed into regional geological survey departments, which were entrusted with the production of geological survey, prospecting, and exploration work.

The head of the Moscow branch of the Geolkom, I. M. Gubkin, participated in the discrediting and abolition of the parent organization (located in Leningrad), summarizing the results (in November 1933), he said:

But the Geological Committee did not want to take this path at all, it considered this path a distortion of its service to pure science. The Geological Service is one of the elements of the great construction project, and not a self-sufficient institution with its own tasks of serving geological science on a global scale, which the old tsarist Geolkom always strove to become.

=== Successors ===
The research subdivisions of the Geolkom left in Leningrad continued their activities as separate sectoral scientific institutions:

- Institute of the Geological Map
- Institute of Non-Ferrous Metals
- Institute of Ferrous Metals
- Institute of Non-Metallic Minerals
- Institute of Coal
- Institute of Groundwater
- Institute of Geophysics
- Institute of Oil
- Drilling Trust
- Central Chemical Laboratory
- Geological Exploration Museum and Library
- 12 Regional Geological Survey Departments (RGRU).

In April 1931, they were reunited again (except for the Institute of Oil) into a single institute under the names:

1931 — TsNIGRI — Central Research Geological Prospecting Institute

1939 – VSEGEI — All-Union Research Geological Institute.

== Moscow Branch of the Geolkom ==
Renamings by date of reorganization:

- 19 October 1918 — Moscow Branch of the Geological Committee (MOGK)
- Autumn 1929 — Moscow Regional Geological Survey Department (MRGRU)
- Summer 1931 — Moscow Regional Geological Survey Trust (MRGRT)
- Autumn 1933 — Moscow Geological-Hydro-Geodetic Trust (MGGGT)
- Summer 1935 — Moscow Geological Trust (MGT)
- Autumn 1938 — Moscow State Geological Administration (MGGU)
- Winter 1953 — Moscow Geological Administration (MGU)
- Autumn 1954 — Geological Administration of Central Regions (GUCR)
- Autumn 1967 — Territorial Geological Administration of Central Regions (TGUCR)
- Spring 1980 — Production Geological Association "Tsentrgeologiya" (PGO)
- Summer 1991 – State Geological Enterprise "Tsentrgeologiya" (GGP).

== See also ==
- Ministry of Geology of the Soviet Union
- Geolkom Trial (1928–1929)
- Russian Geological Research Institute
- Geophysical Service of the Russian Academy of Sciences

== Literature ==
Vernadsky V. I. "Fundamental changes are inevitable...". Diary of 1941 // "Novy Mir" 1995, No. 5. (Publication, text preparation and notes by I. Mochanov) The manuscript of the diary is stored in the Archive of the Russian Academy of Sciences, fund 518 V. I. Vernadsky (inventory 2).

Khabakov A. V. Activity of the Geological Committee in Russia // Proceedings of the Institute of Natural Science and Technology of the USSR Academy of Sciences. Volume 27. M., 1959.

Kleopov I. L. Geological Committee (1882–1929): History of Geology in Russia / ed. S. V. Obruchev. M.: Nauka, 1964. 175 p.

Outstanding Domestic Geologists, L., 1978 (Essays on the History of Geological Knowledge, issue 19)

VSEGEI in the Development of Geological Science and the Mineral Resource Base of the Country, 1882–1982, L., 1982 (Proceedings of VSEGEI. Vol. 314).

Outstanding Scientists of the Geological Committee – VSEGEI. L., 1982.

Evdoshenko Yu. V. Geolkom and Reforms. On the 130th Anniversary of Russia's First Geological Institution // Gornye Vedomosti. 2012. No. 8. P. 72–86.

Evdoshenko Yu. V. Liquidation of the Geolkom. On the 130th Anniversary of Russia's First Geological Institution // Gornye Vedomosti. 2012. No. 10. P. 60–72.

== Links ==
- Scientists of the Geological Committee — Essays on the History of Geological Knowledge. 1971.
- Building of the Geological Committee (VSEGEI)
- 130 Years of the Geolkom (VSEGEI), 2012.
