= Armorial of Russia =

List of the Coats of arms of the Russian Federation

This article lists emblems and coats of arms used in Russia, including the federal subjects and other subdivisions.

== Current coats of arms ==
=== Federation ===
Coat of Arms of the Russian Federation (1993–present)

=== Republics ===
Coat of arms of the Republic of Adygea

Coat of arms of the Altai Republic

Coat of arms of Bashkortostan

Coat of arms of Buryatia

Coat of arms of Chechnya

Coat of arms of Chuvashia

Coat of arms of Crimea

Coat of arms of Dagestan

Coat of arms of the Donetsk People's Republic

Coat of arms of Ingushetia

Coat of arms of Kabardino-Balkaria

Coat of arms of Kalmykia

Coat of arms of Karachay-Cherkessia

Coat of arms of Karelia

Coat of arms of Khakassia

Coat of arms of the Komi Republic

Coat of arms of the Lugansk People's Republic

Coat of arms of Mari El

Coat of arms of Mordovia

Coat of arms of North Ossetia–Alania

Coat of arms of Sakha

Coat of arms of Tatarstan

Coat of arms of Tuva

Coat of arms of Udmurtia

=== Oblasts ===
Coat of arms of Amur Oblast

Coat of arms of Arkhangelsk Oblast

Coat of arms of Astrakhan Oblast

Coat of arms of Belgorod Oblast

Coat of arms of Bryansk Oblast

Coat of arms of Chelyabinsk Oblast

Coat of arms of Irkutsk Oblast

Coat of arms of Ivanovo Oblast

Coat of arms of Kaliningrad Oblast

Coat of arms of Kaluga Oblast

Coat of arms of Kemerovo Oblast

Coat of arms of Kherson Oblast

Coat of arms of Kirov Oblast

Coat of arms of Kostroma Oblast

Coat of arms of Kurgan Oblast

Coat of arms of Kursk Oblast

Coat of arms of Leningrad Oblast

Coat of arms of Lipetsk Oblast

Coat of arms of Magadan Oblast

Coat of arms of Moscow Oblast

Coat of arms of Murmansk Oblast

Coat of arms of Nizhny Novgorod Oblast

Coat of arms of Novgorod Oblast

Coat of arms of Novosibirsk Oblast

Coat of arms of Omsk Oblast

Coat of arms of Orenburg Oblast

Coat of arms of Oryol Oblast

Coat of arms of Penza Oblast

Coat of arms of Pskov Oblast

Coat of arms of Rostov Oblast

Coat of arms of Ryazan Oblast

Coat of arms of Sakhalin Oblast

Coat of arms of Samara Oblast

Coat of arms of Saratov Oblast

Coat of arms of Smolensk Oblast

Coat of arms of Sverdlovsk Oblast

Coat of arms of Tambov Oblast

Coat of arms of Tomsk Oblast

Coat of arms of Tver Oblast

Coat of arms of Tyumen Oblast

Coat of arms of Ulyanovsk Oblast

Coat of arms of Vladimir Oblast

Coat of arms of Volgograd Oblast

Coat of arms of Vologda Oblast

Coat of arms of Voronezh Oblast

Coat of arms of Yaroslavl Oblast

Coat of arms of Zaporozhye Oblast

=== Krais ===
Coat of arms of Altai Krai

Coat of arms of Kamchatka Krai

Coat of arms of Khabarovsk Krai

Coat of arms of Krasnodar Krai

Coat of arms of Krasnoyarsk Krai

Coat of arms of Perm Krai

Coat of arms of Primorsky Krai

Coat of arms of Stavropol Krai

Coat of arms of Zabaykalsky Krai

=== Autonomous oblasts ===
Coat of arms of Jewish Autonomous Oblast

=== Autonomous okrugs ===
Coat of arms of Chukotka

Coat of arms of Khanty-Mansi

Coat of arms of Nenetsia

Coat of arms of Yamalo-Nenets

=== Federal cities ===
Coat of arms of Moscow

Coat of arms of Saint Petersburg

Coat of arms of Sevastopol

=== Institutions ===
Central Election Commission

Federal Antimonopoly Service

Federal Agency of Geodesy and Cartography (defunct)

FAPSI (defunct)

Federal Rail Transport Agency

Rosstat

Federal Road Agency

Roskomnadzor

Federal Air Transport Agency

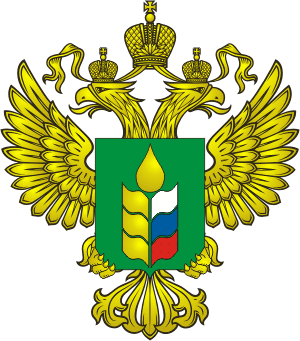
Ministry of Agriculture

Ministry of Foreign Affairs

Ministry of Education and Science (defunct)

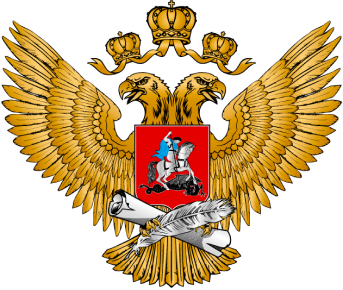
Ministry of Education

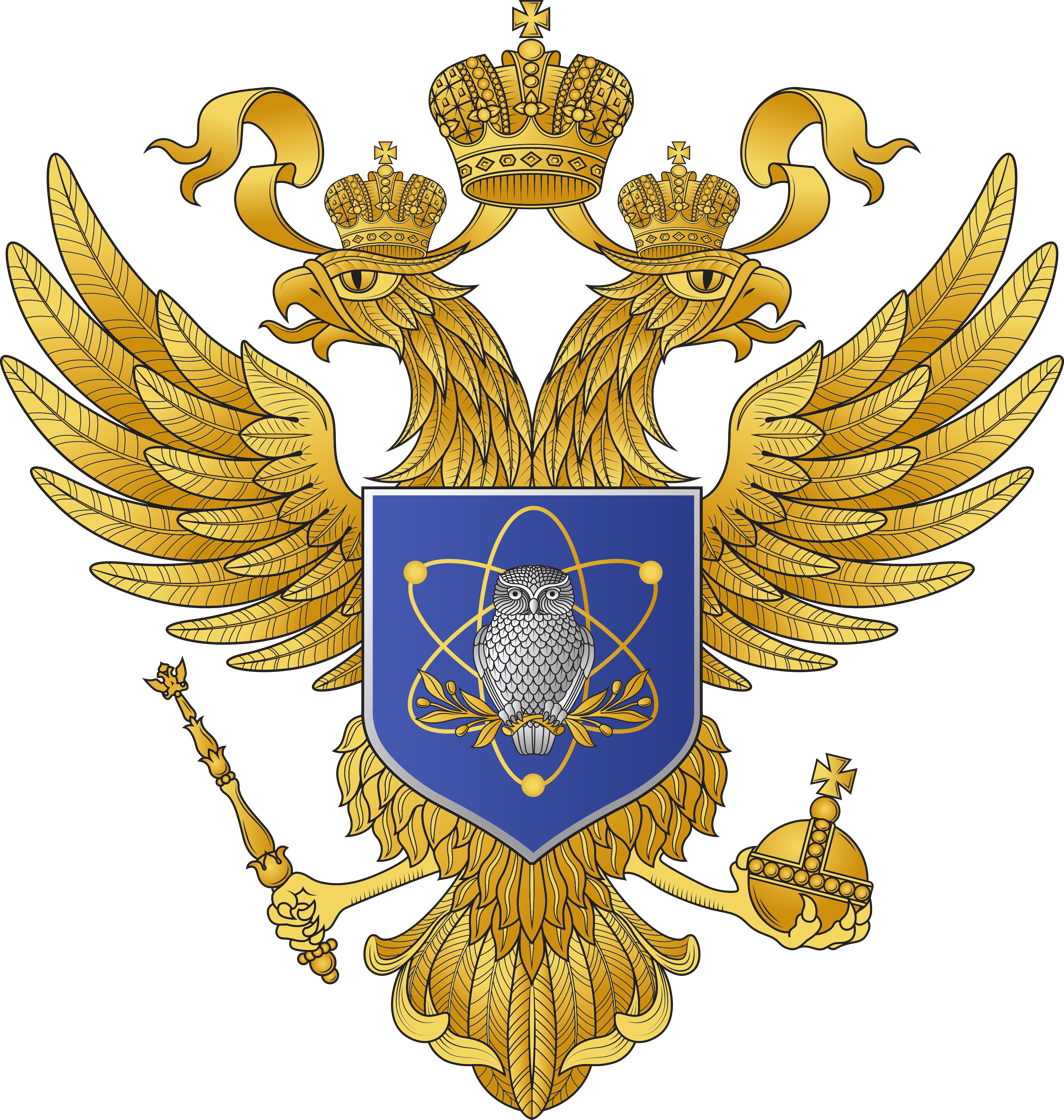
Ministry of Science and Higher Education

Ministry for the Development of the Russian Far East and Arctic

Federal Agency for Fishery

Rospotrebnadzor

Federal Service of Military-Technical Cooperation

Judicial Department

Ministry of Digital Development, Communications and Mass Media

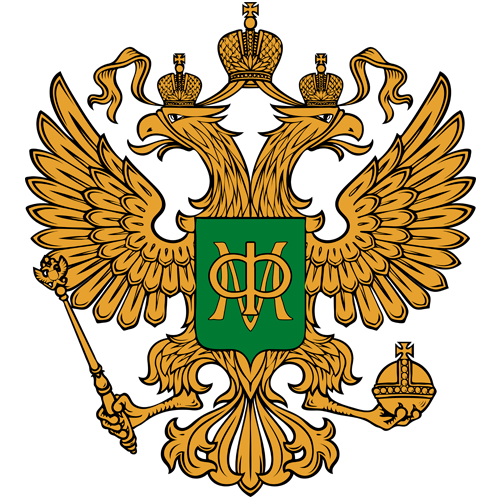
Ministry of Finance

National Guard of Russia

Office of the Prosecutor-General of Russia

State Courier Service

High Court of Arbitration (defunct)

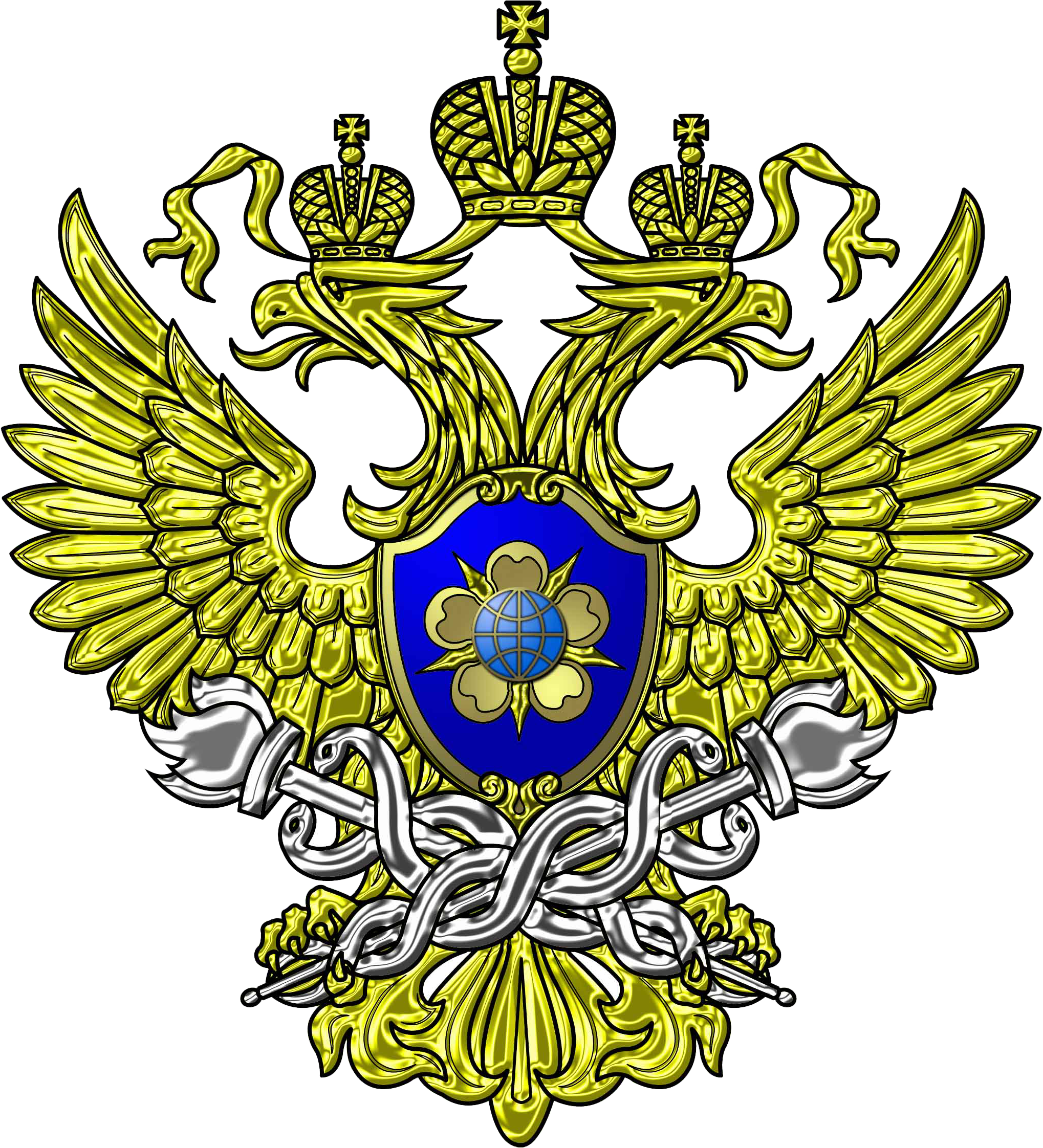
Rosfinmonitoring

== Former subjects ==
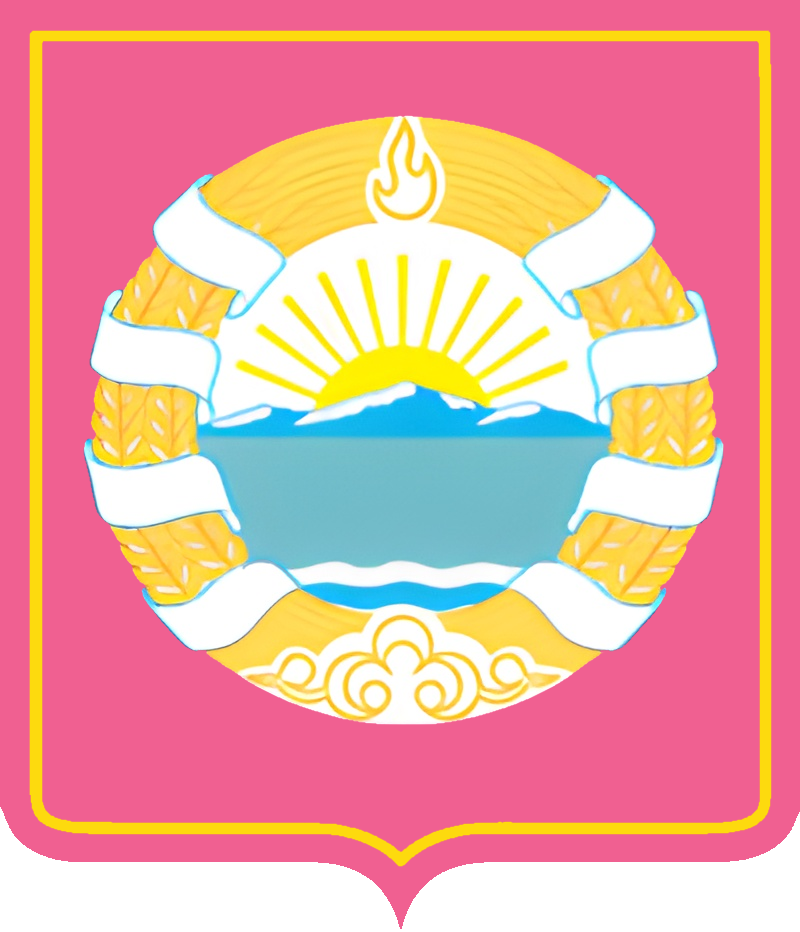
Coat of arms of Agin-Buryat Autonomous Okrug

Coat of arms of Chita Oblast

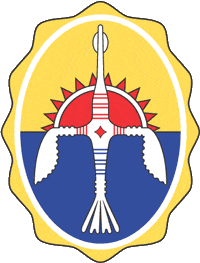
Coat of arms of Evenk Autonomous Okrug

Coat of arms of Kamchatka Oblast

Coat of arms of Komi-Permyak Autonomous Okrug

Coat of arms of Koryak Autonomous Okrug

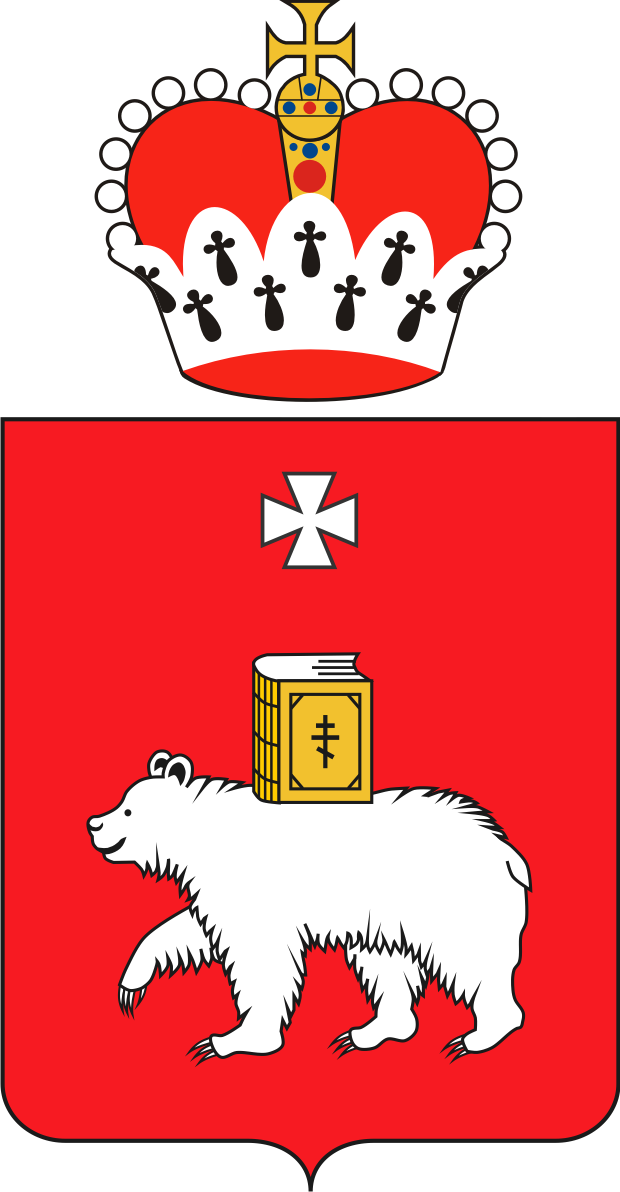
Coat of arms of Perm Oblast

Coat of arms of Taymyr Autonomous Okrug

Coat of arms of Ust-Orda Buryat Autonomous Okrug

== Adygea ==
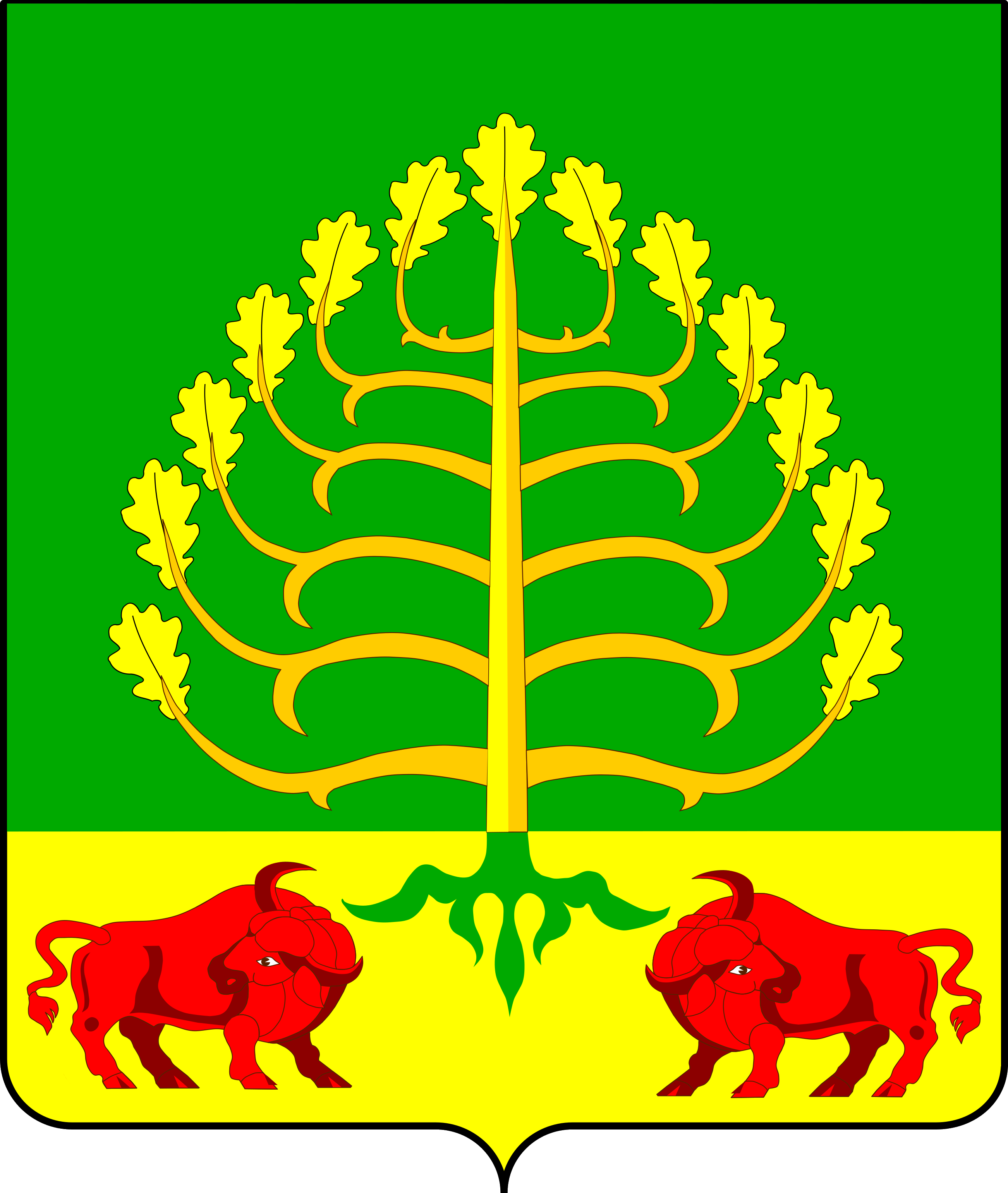
Adygeysk

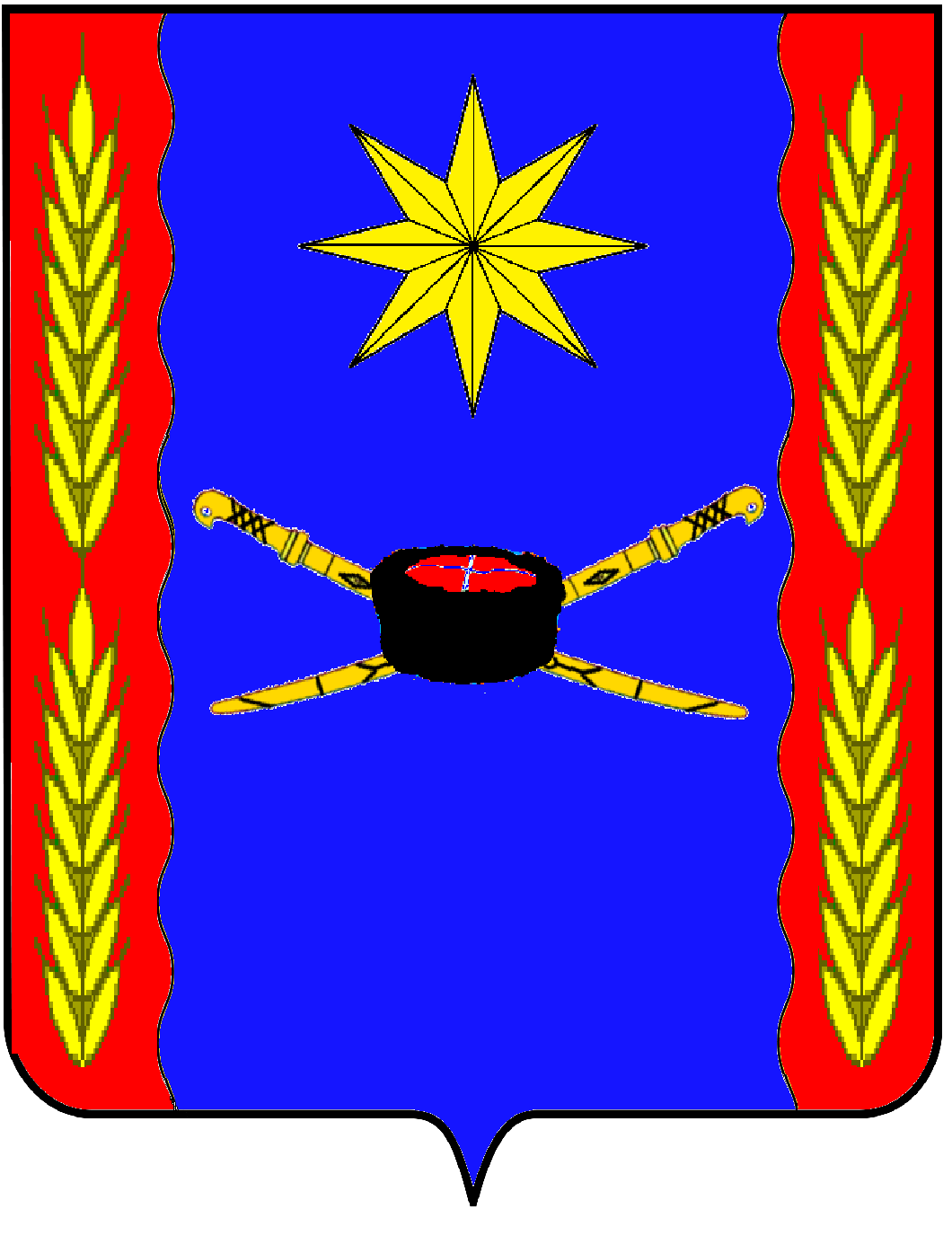
Giaginskaya

Maykop

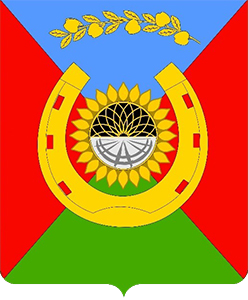
Giaginsky District

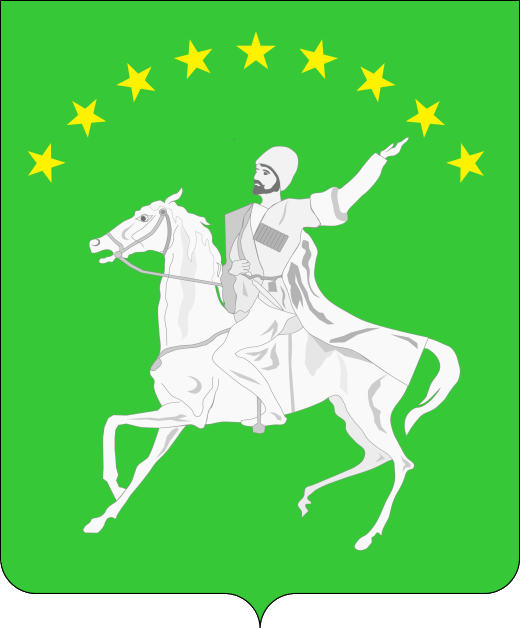
Koshekhablsky District

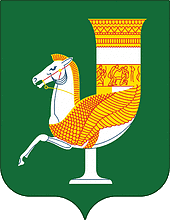
Krasnogvardeysky District

Maykopsky District

Takhtamukaysky District

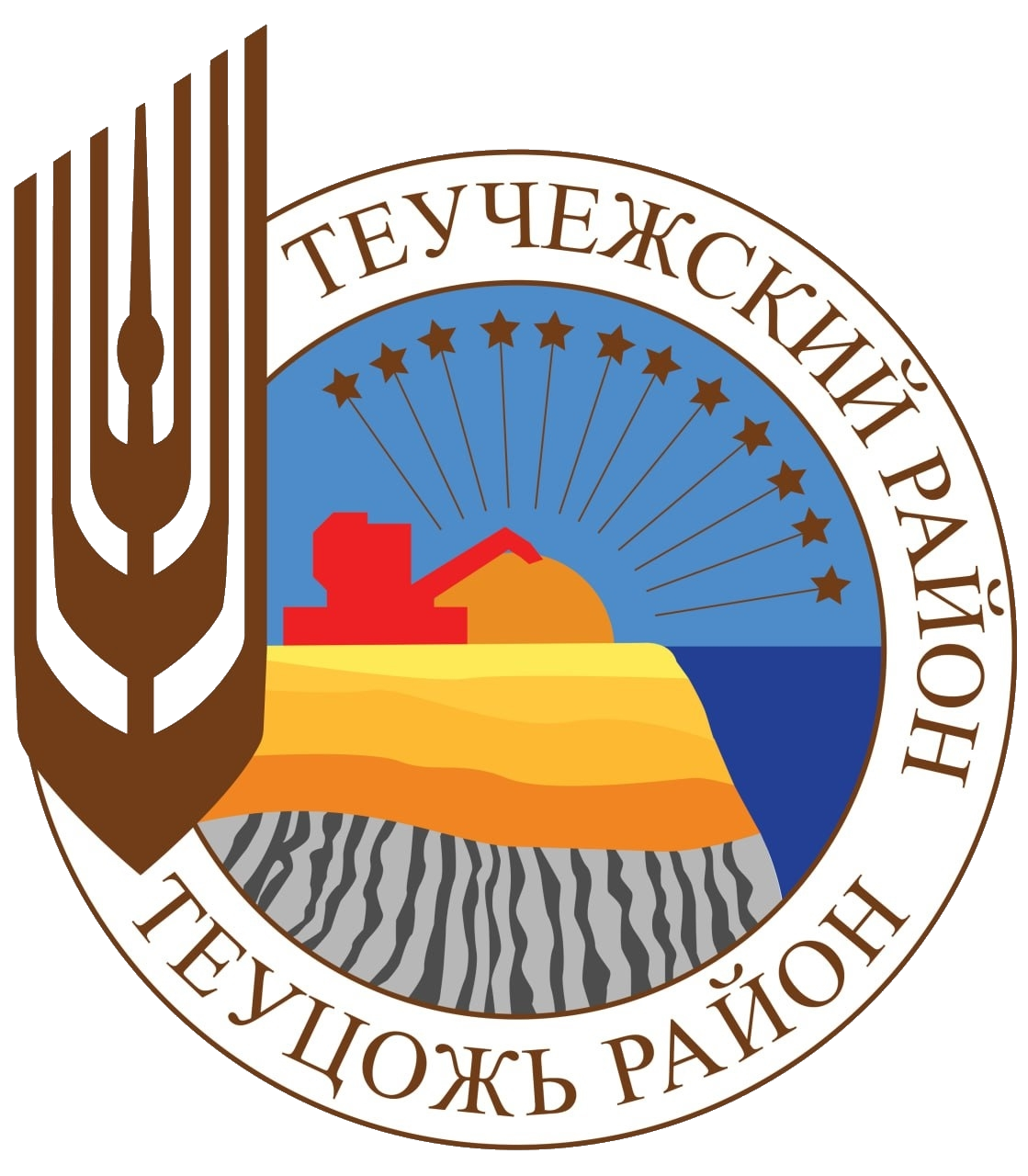
Teuchezhsky District

Shovgenovsky District

== Altai ==
Gorno-Altaysk

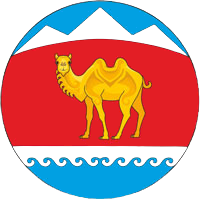
Kosh-Agachsky District

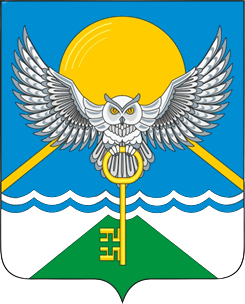
Mayminsky District

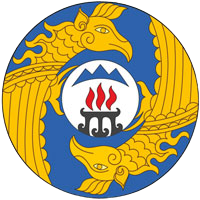
Ongudaysky District

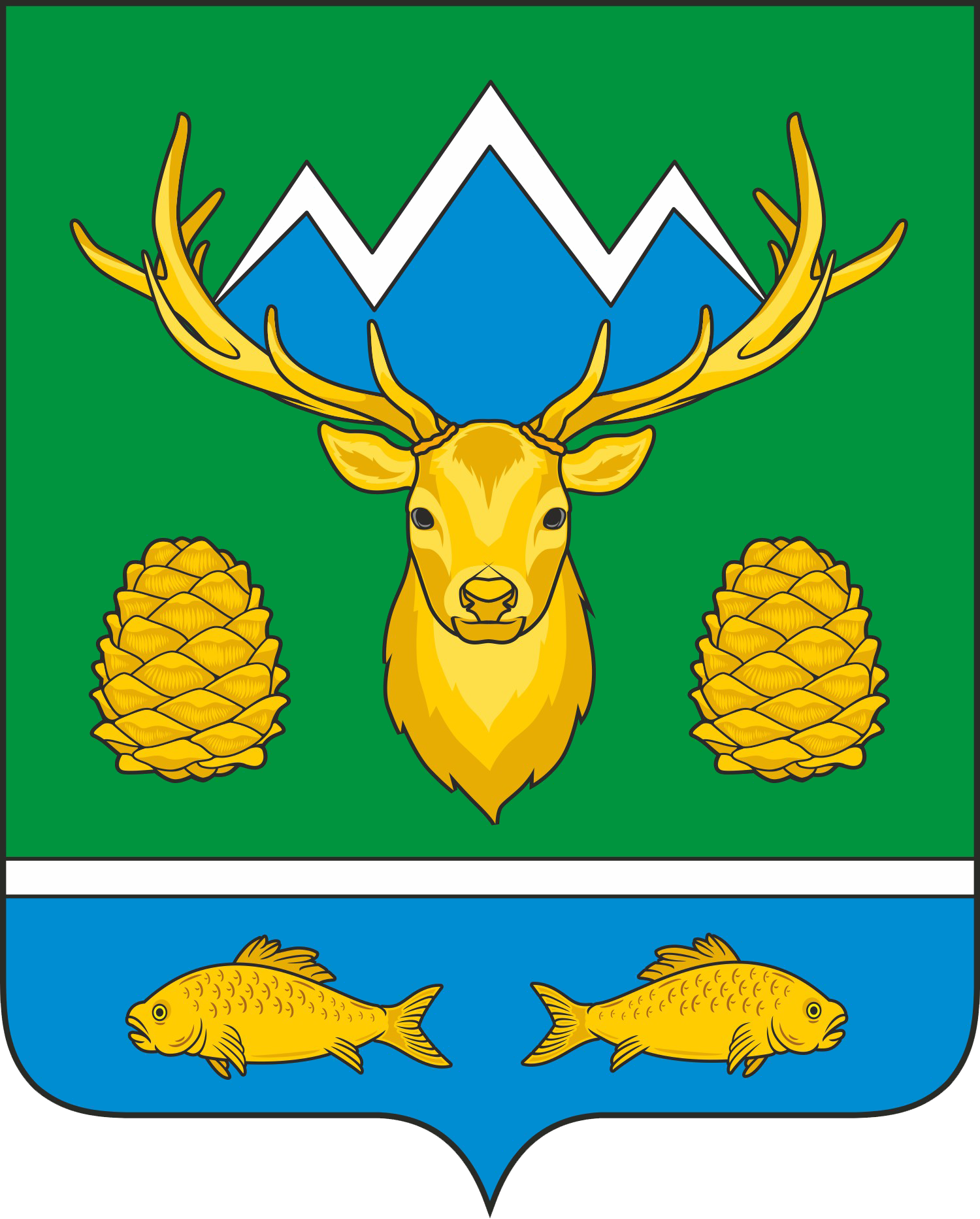
Turochaksky District

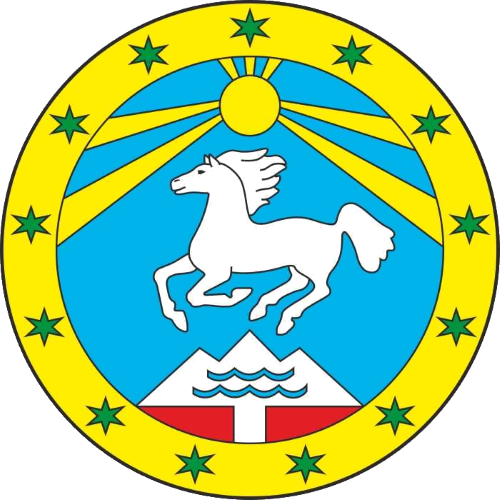
Ulagansky District

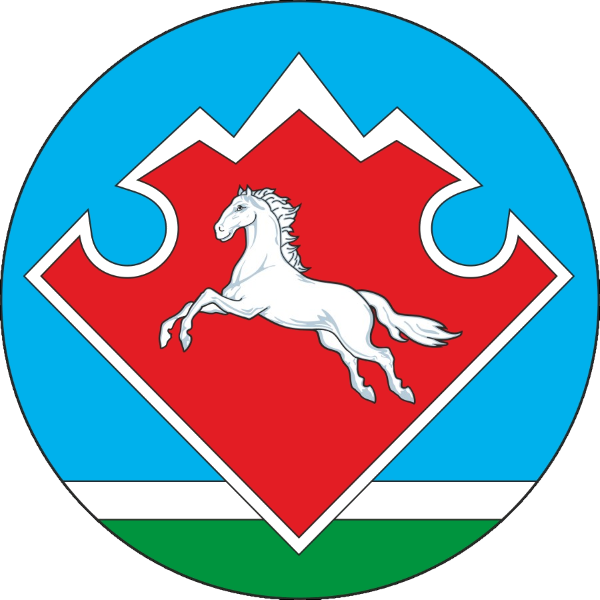
Ust-Kansky District

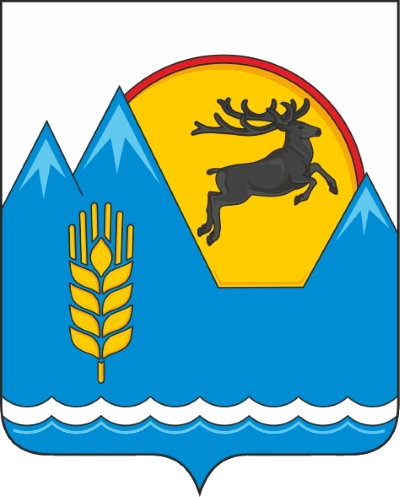
Ust-Koksinsky District

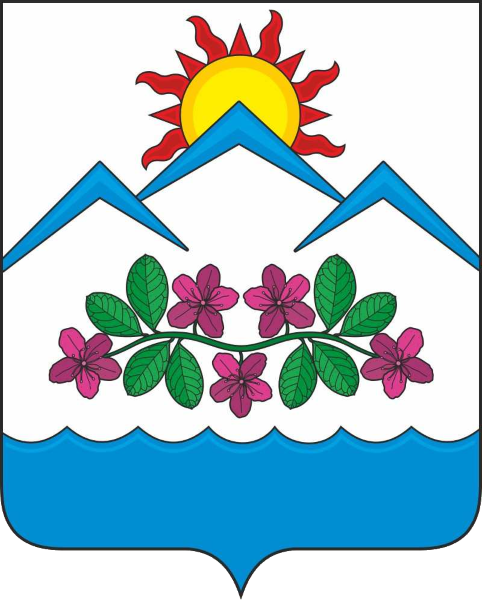
Chemalsky District

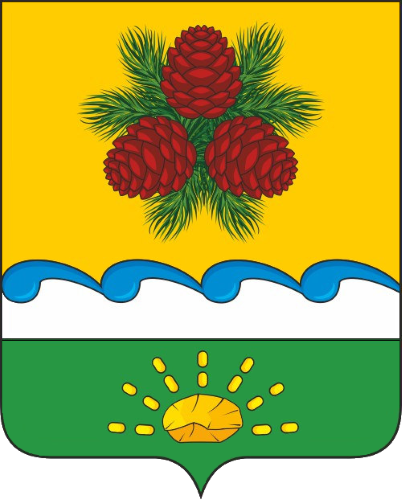
Choysky District

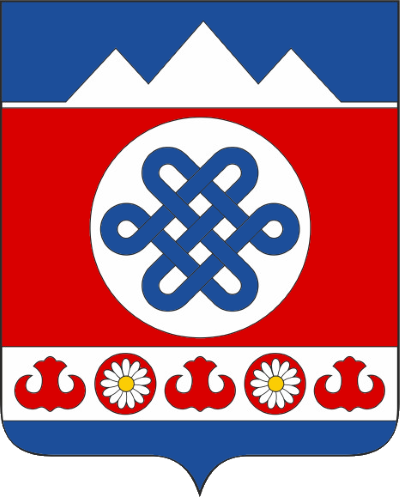
Shebalinsky District

== Bashkortostan ==
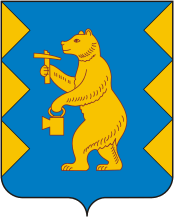
Mezhgorye

Ufa

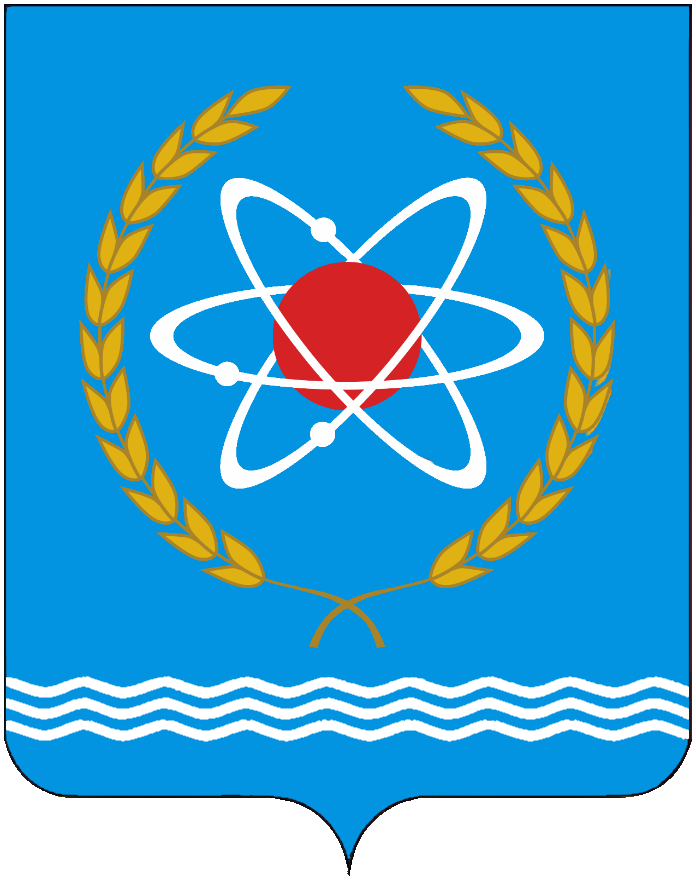
Agidel

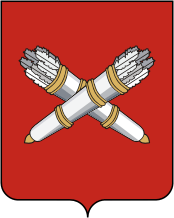
Belebey

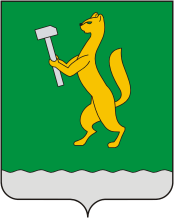
Beloretsk

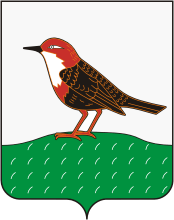
Birsk

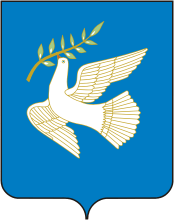
Blagoveshchensk

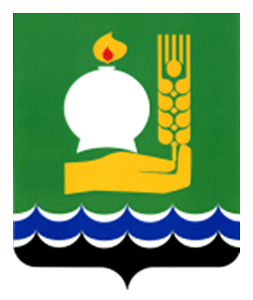
Dyurtyuli

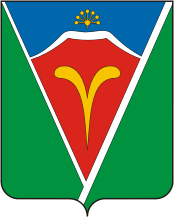
Ishimbay

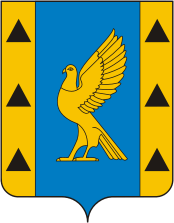
Kumertau

Meleuz

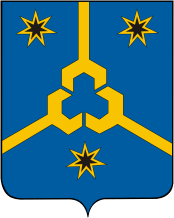
Neftekamsk

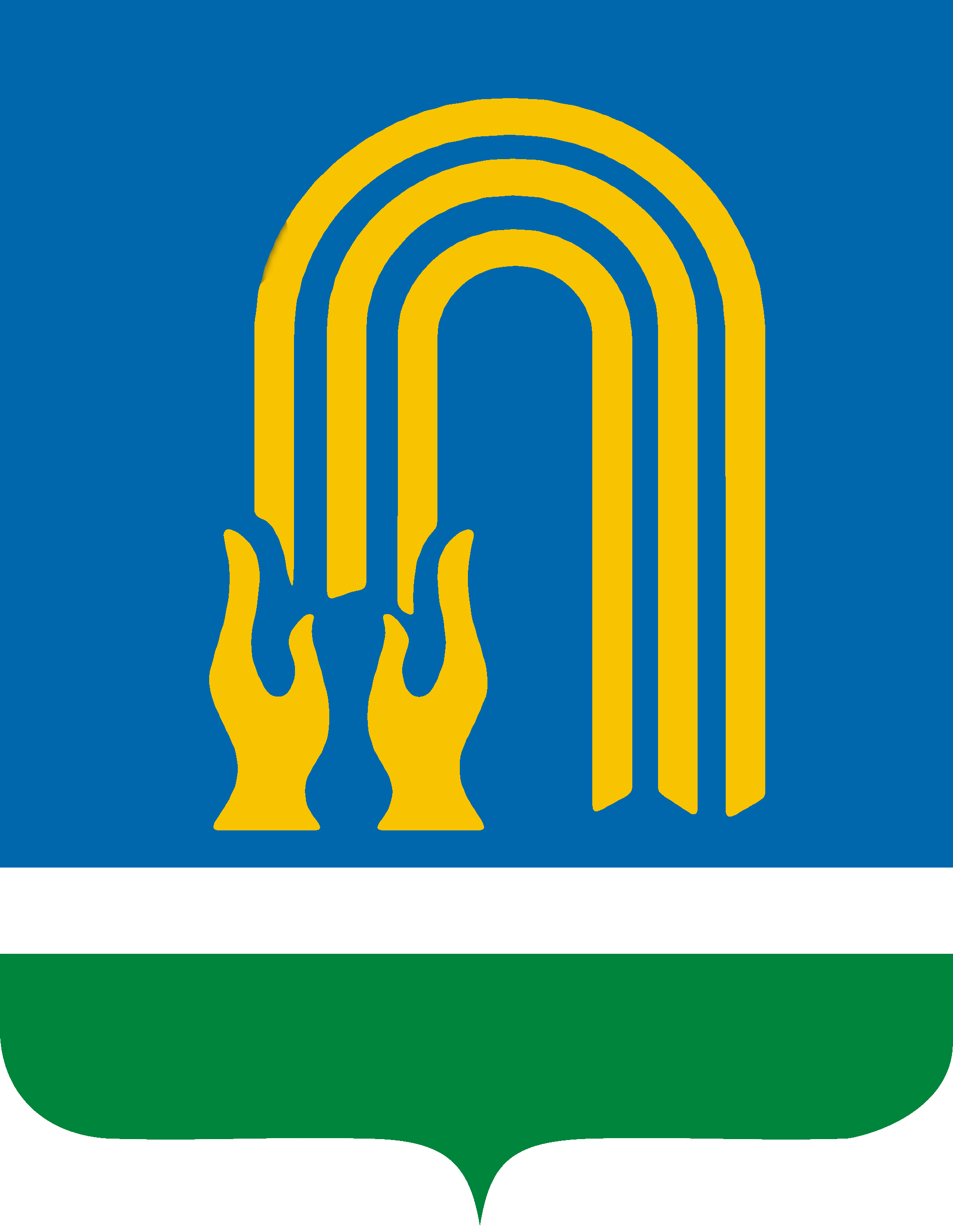
Oktyabrsky

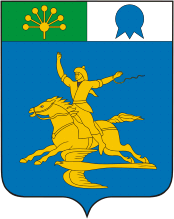
Salavat

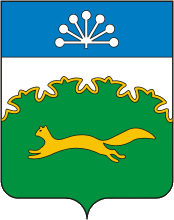
Sibay

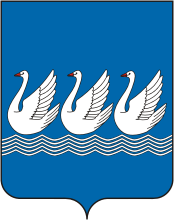
Sterlitamak

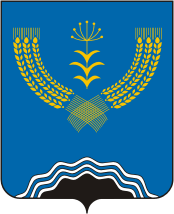
Tuymazy

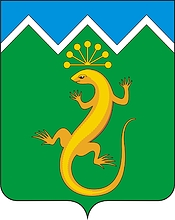
Uchaly

Yanaul

Abzelilovsky District

Alsheyevsky District

Arkhangelsky District

Askinsky District

Aurgazinsky District

Bakalinsky District

Baymaksky District

Baltachevsky District

Belebeyevsky District

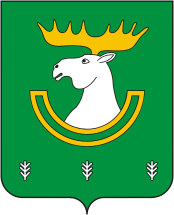
Belokataysky District

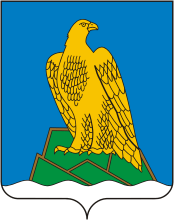
Beloretsky District

Bizhbulyaksky District

Birsky District

Blagovarsky District

Blagoveshchensky District

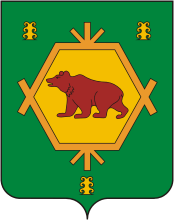
Burzyansky District

Burayevsky District

Buzdyaksky District

Gafuriysky District

Davlekanovsky District

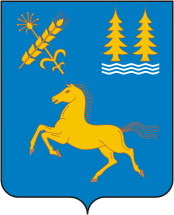
Duvansky District

Dyurtyulinsky District

Yermekeyevsky District

Zianchurinsky District

Zilairsky District

Iglinsky District

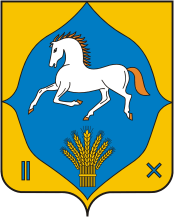
Ilishevsky District

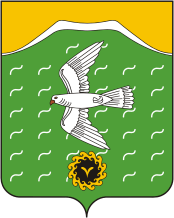
Ishimbaysky District

Kaltasinsky District

Karaidelsky District

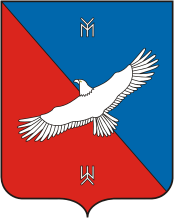
Karmaskalinsky District

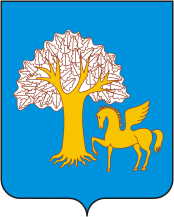
Kiginsky District

Krasnokamsky District

Kugarchinsky District

Kuyurgazinsky District

Kushnarenkovsky District

Mechetlinsky District

Meleuzovsky District

Mishkinsky District

Miyakinsky District

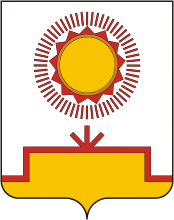
Nurimanovsky District

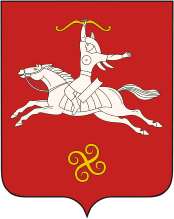
Salavatsky District

Sterlibashevsky District

Sterlitamaksky District

Tatyshlinsky District

Uchalinsky District

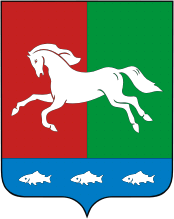
Ufimsky District

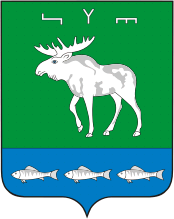
Fyodorovsky District

Khaybullinsky District

Chekmagushevsky District

Chishminsky District

Sharansky District

Yanaulsky District

== Buryatia ==
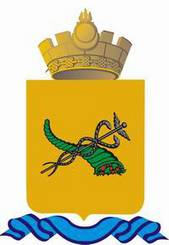
Ulan-Ude

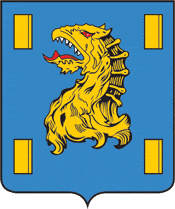
Kyakhta

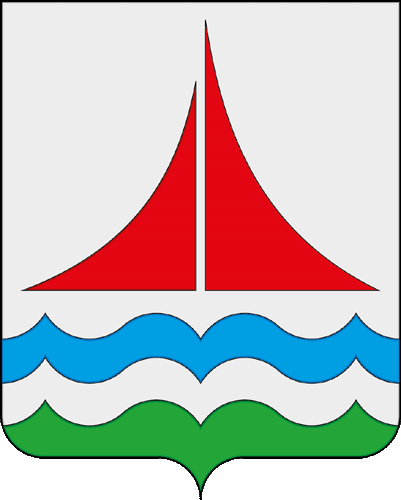
Severobaykalsk

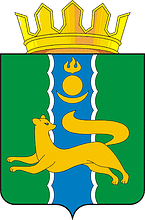
Barguzinsky District

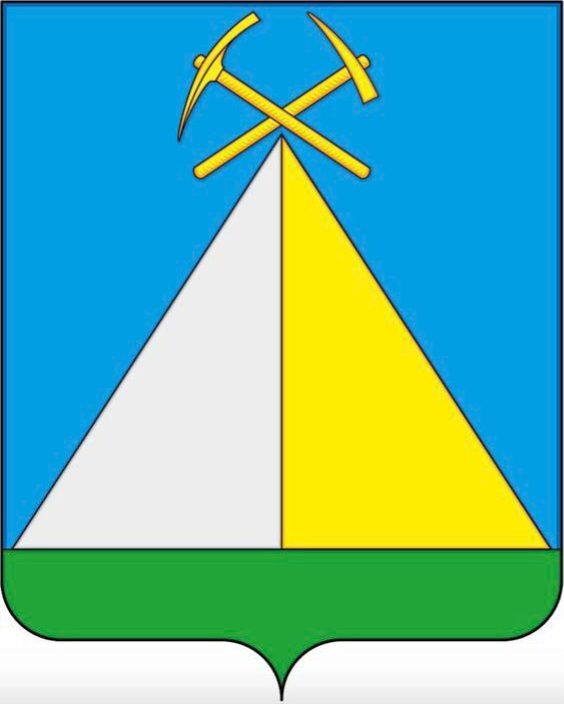
Bauntovsky District

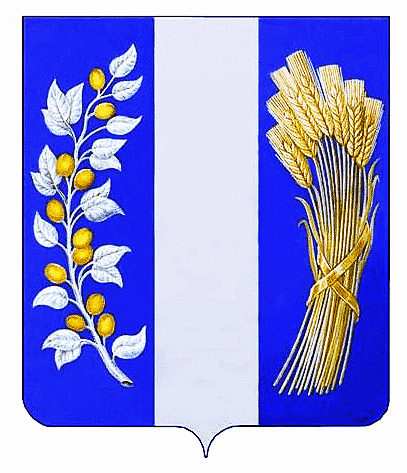
Bichursky District

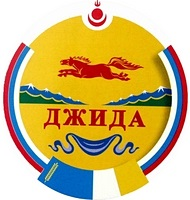
Dzhidinsky District

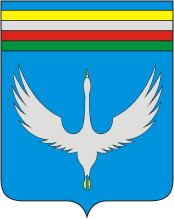
Yeravninsky District

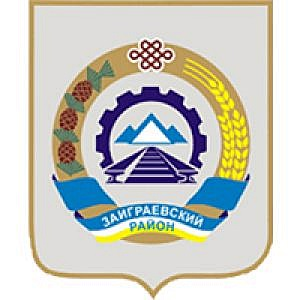
Zaigrayevsky District

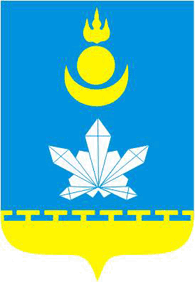
Zakamensky District

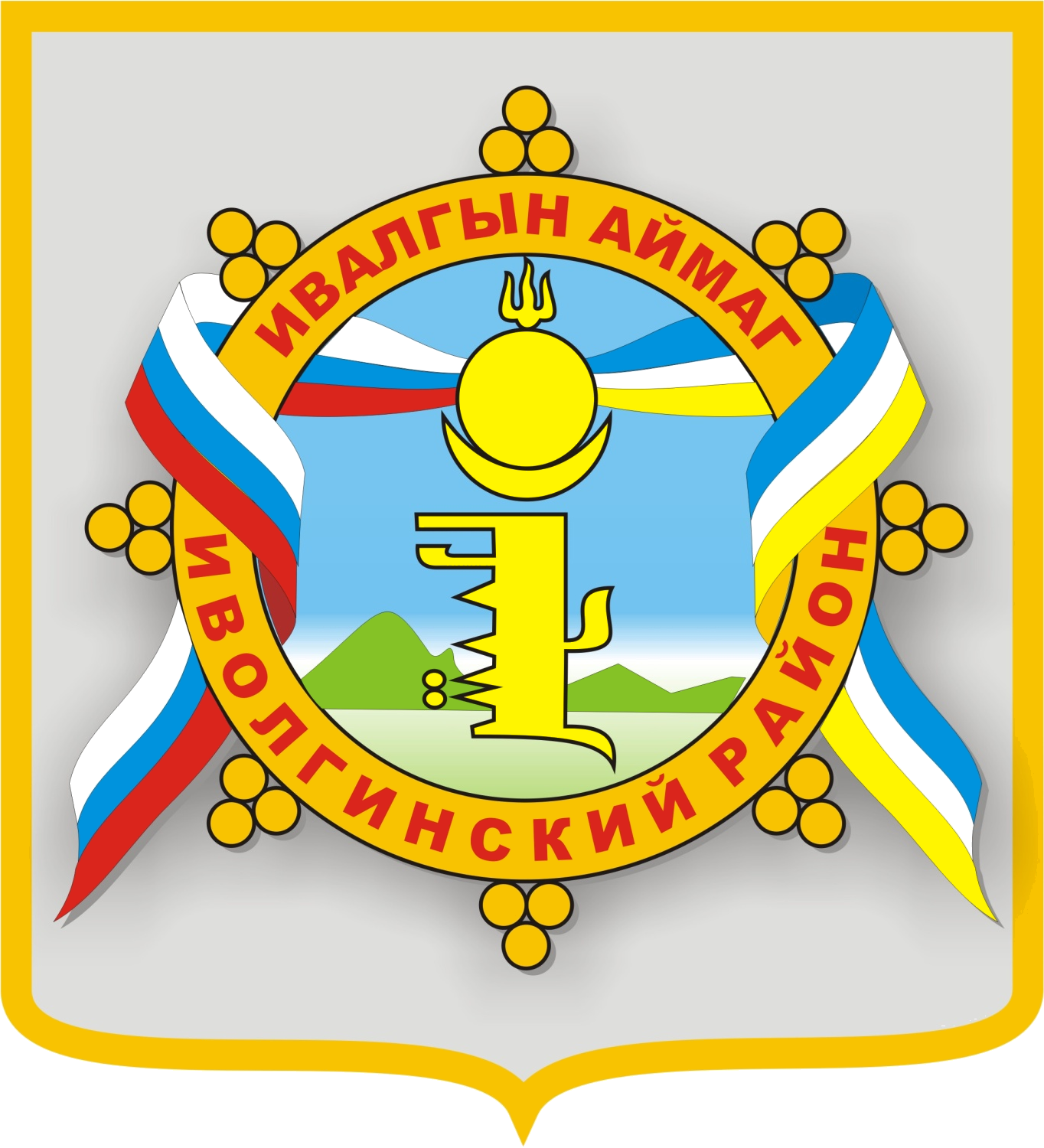
Ivolginsky District

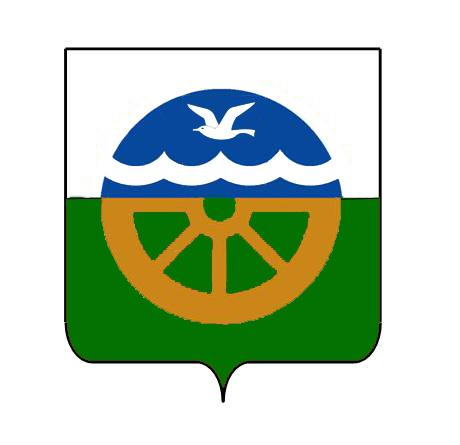
Kabansky District

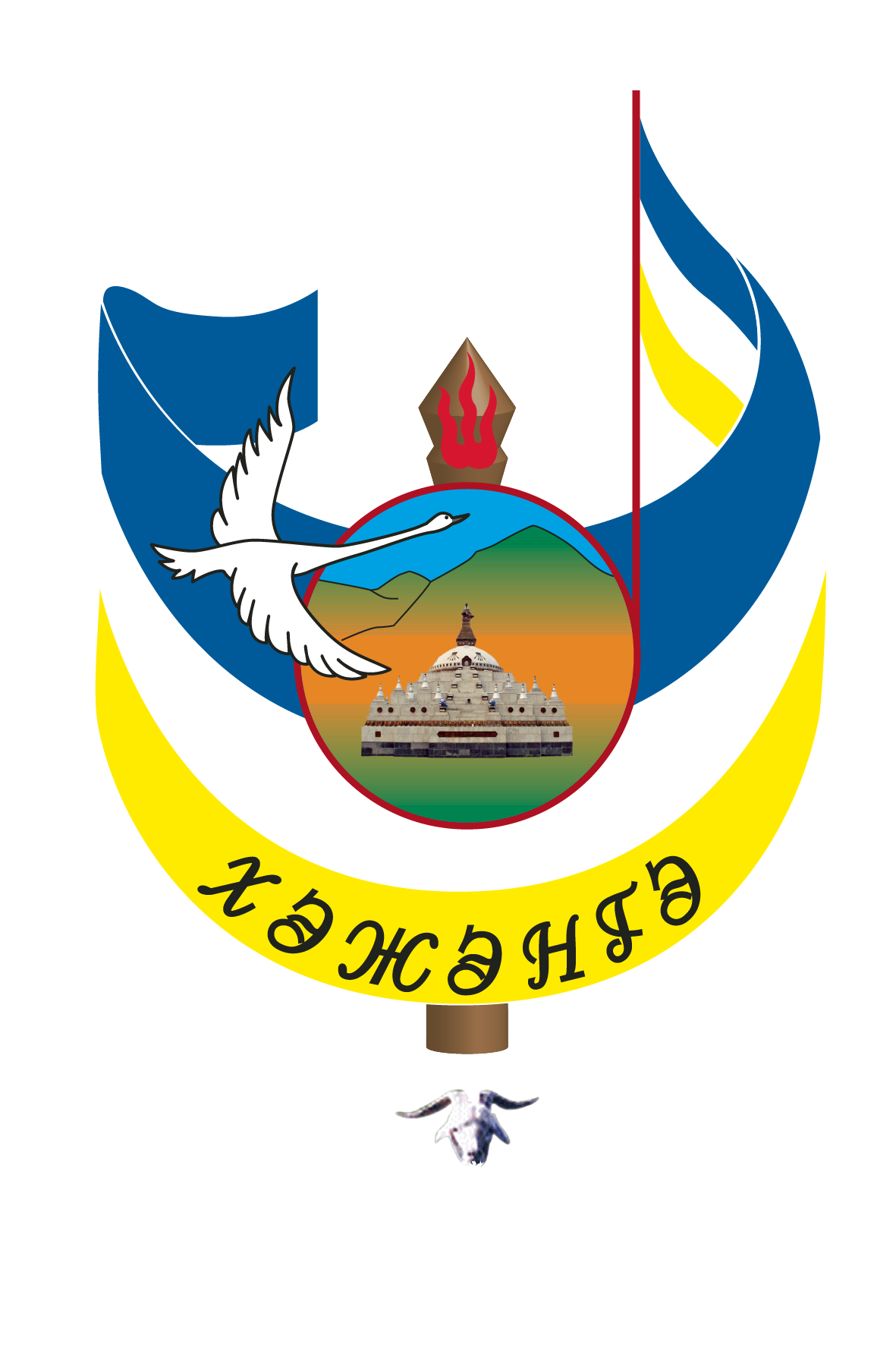
Kizhinginsky District

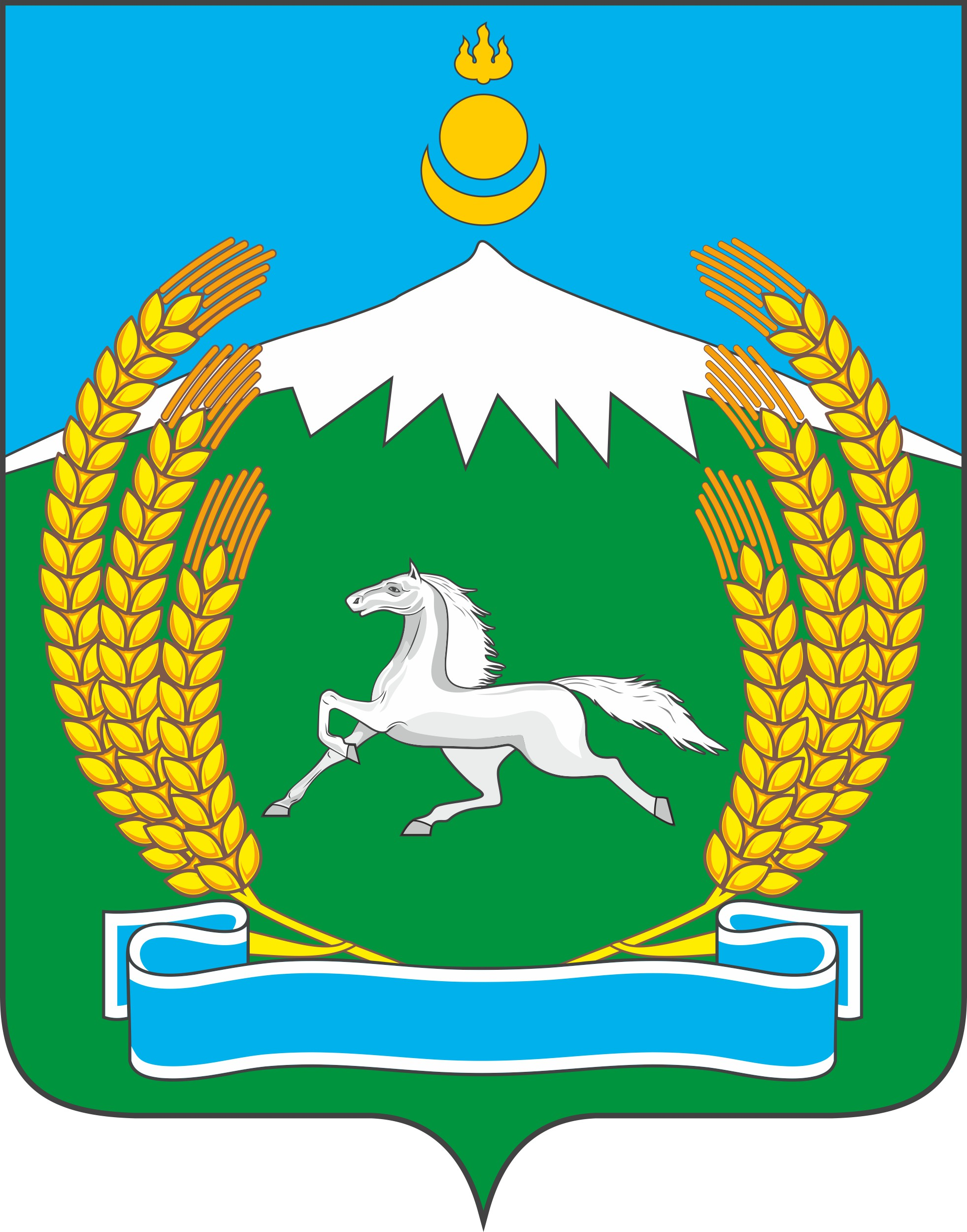
Kurumkansky District

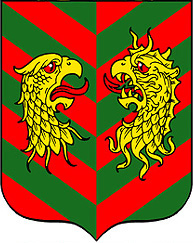
Kyakhtinsky District

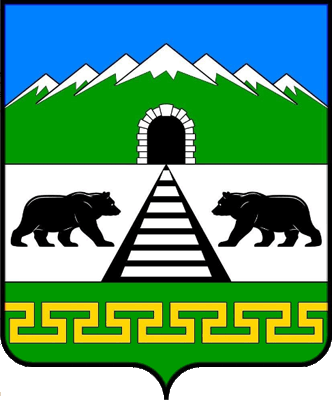
Muysky District

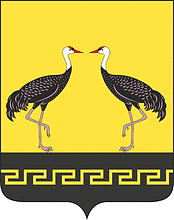
Mukhorshibirsky District

Okinsky District

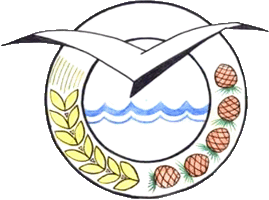
Pribaykalsky District

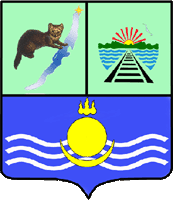
Severo-Baykalsky District

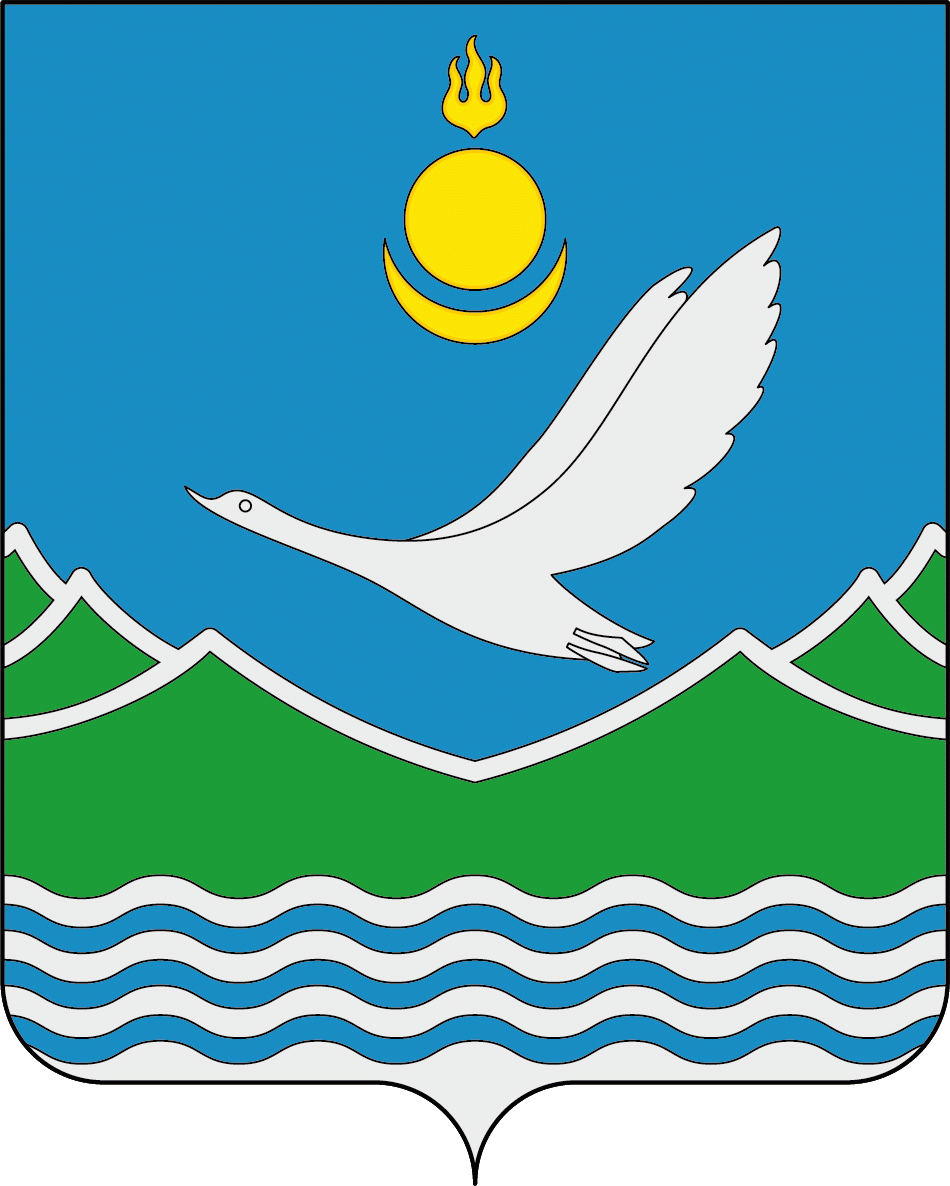
Selenginsky District

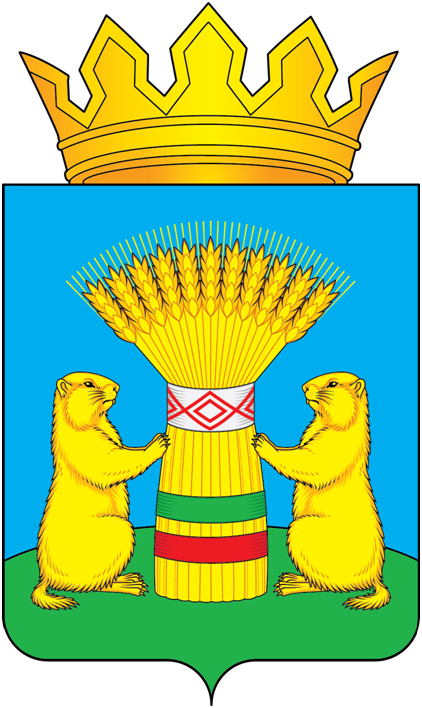
Tarbagataysky District

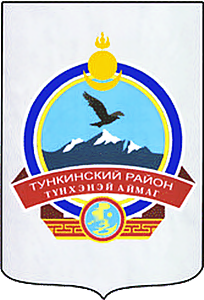
Tunkinsky District

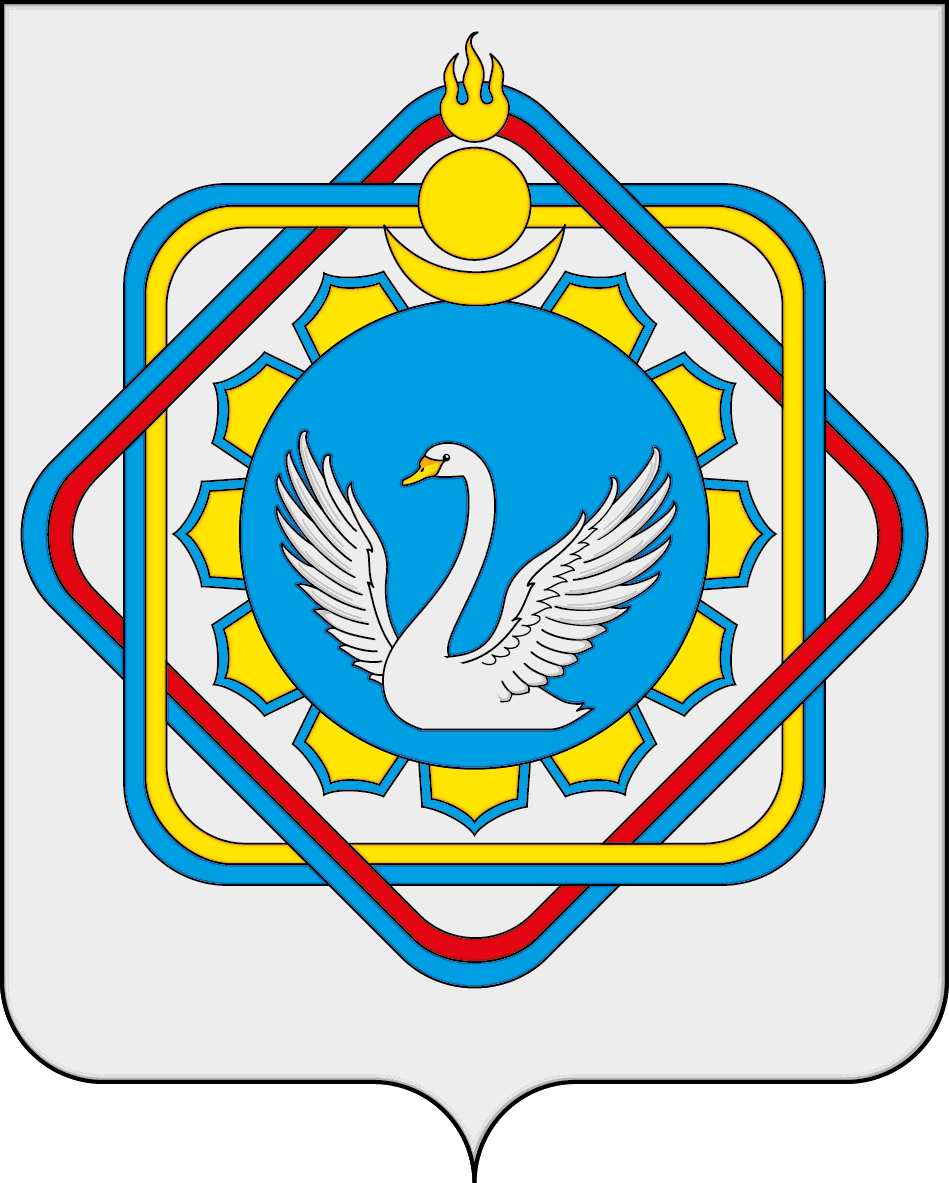
Khorinsky District

== Chechnya ==
Grozny

Argun

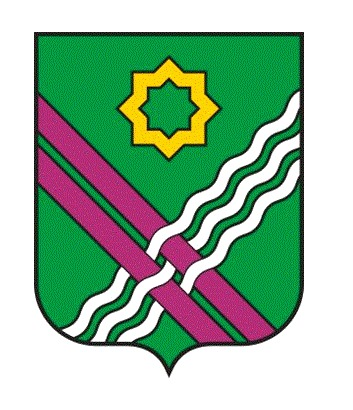
Achkhoy-Martanovsky District

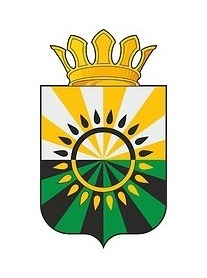
Groznensky District

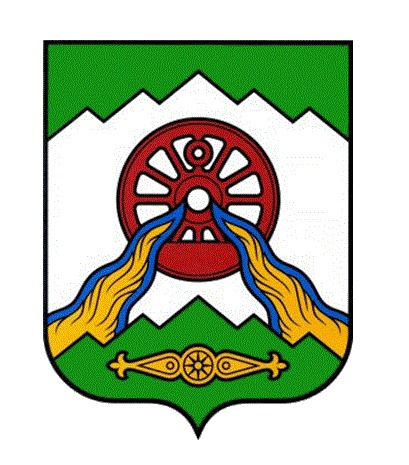
Gudermessky District

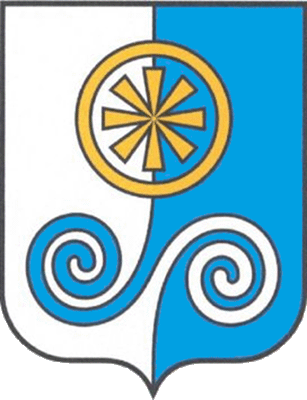
Itum-Kalinsky District

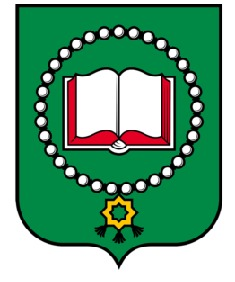
Kurchaloyevsky District

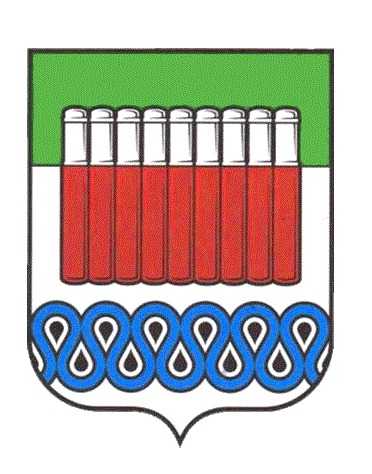
Nadterechny District

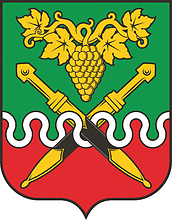
Naursky District

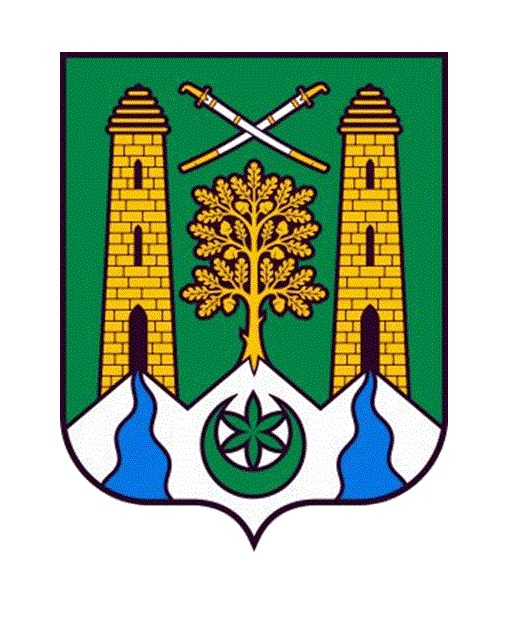
Nozhay-Yurtovsky District

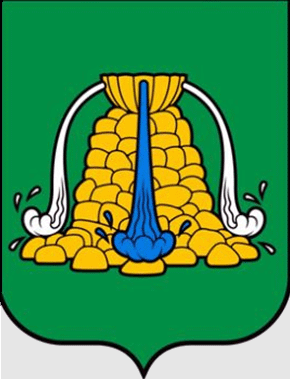
Sernovodsky District

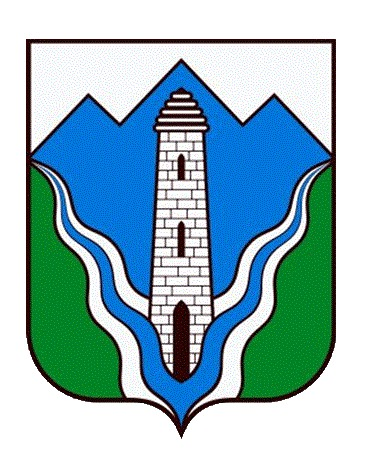
Shatoysky District

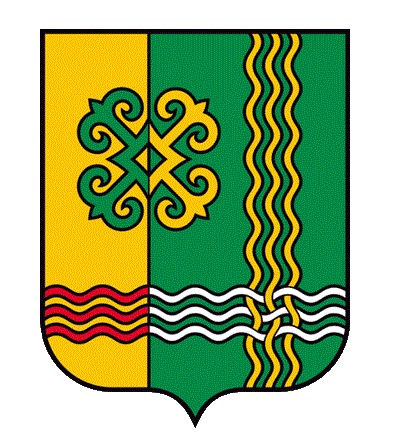
Shelkovskoy District

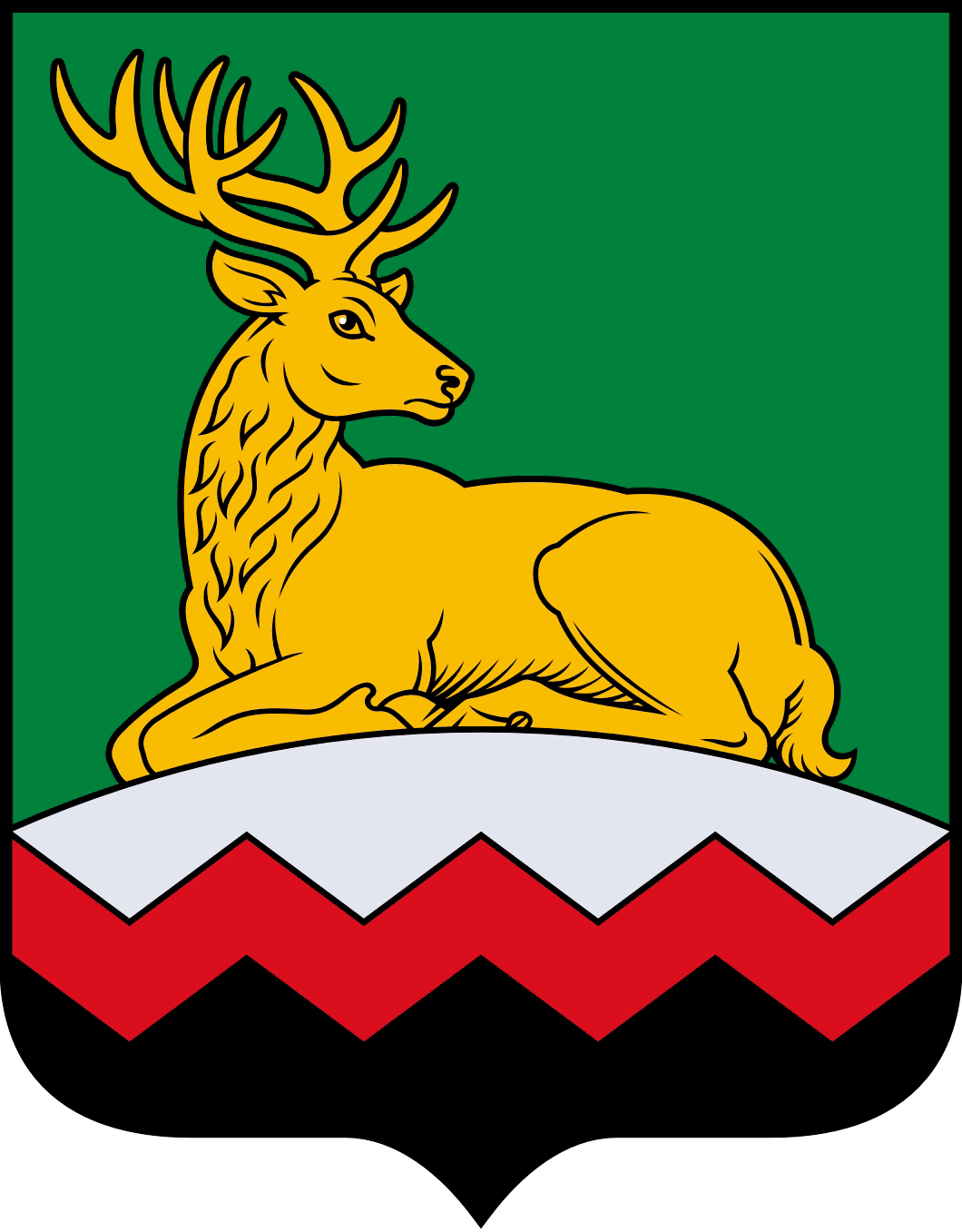
Urus-Martanovsky District

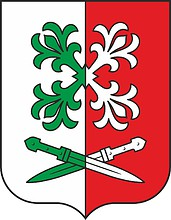
Vedensky District

== Chuvashia ==
Cheboksary

Alatyr

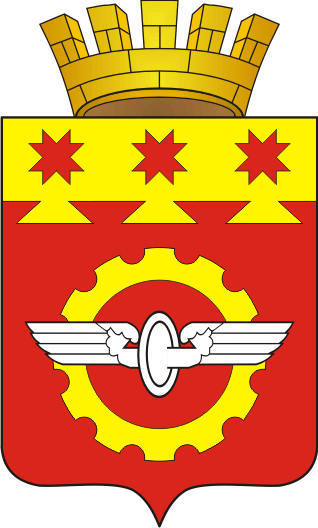
Kanash

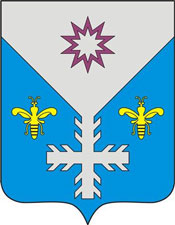
Kozlovka

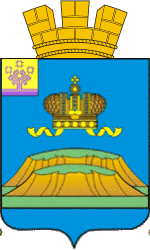
Mariinsky Posad

Novocheboksarsk

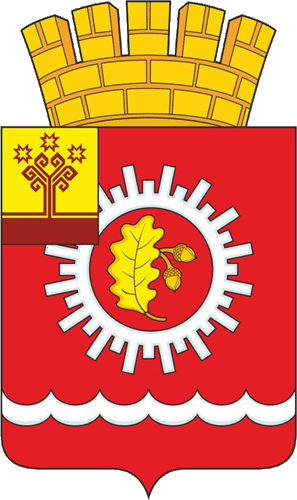
Shumerlya

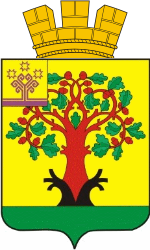
Tsivilsk

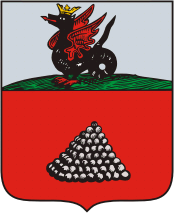
Yadrin

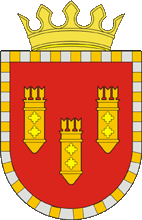
Alatyrsky District

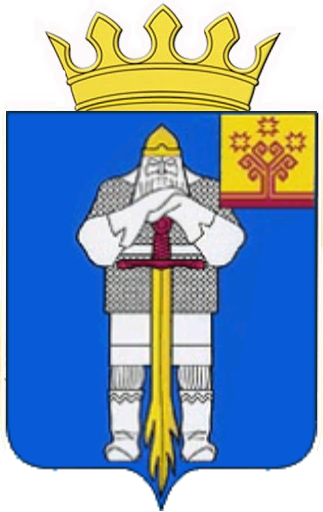
Batyrevsky District

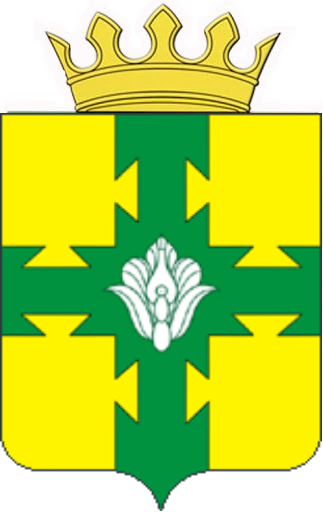
Kanashsky District

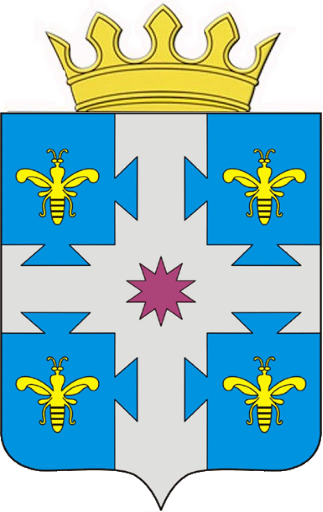
Kozlovsky District

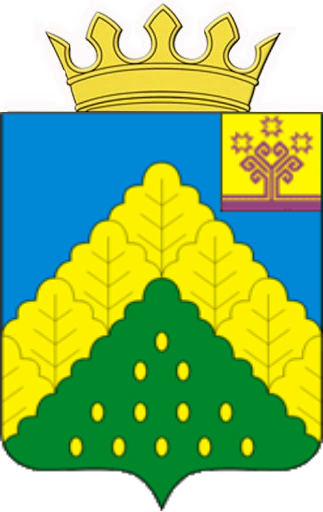
Komsomolsky District

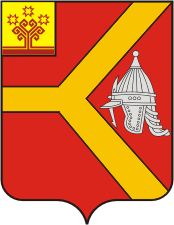
Krasnoarmeysky District

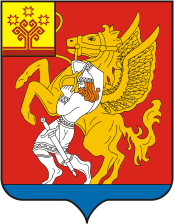
Krasnochetaysky District

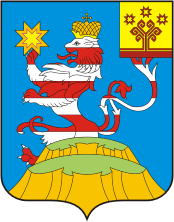
Mariinsko-Posadsky District

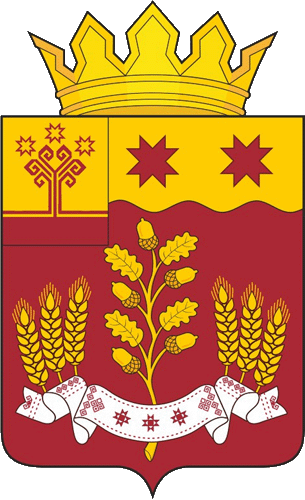
Morgaushsky District

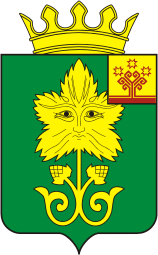
Urmarsky District

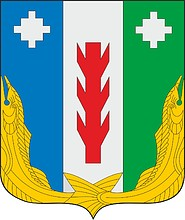
Poretsky District

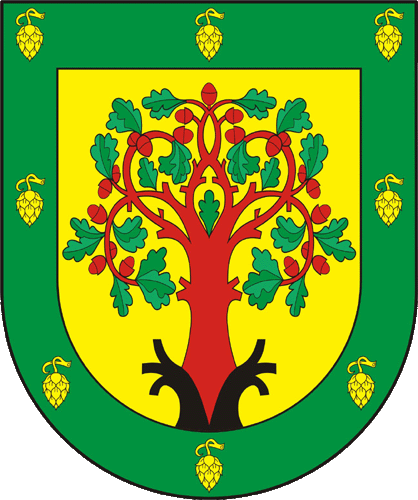
Tsivilsky District

Cheboksarsky District

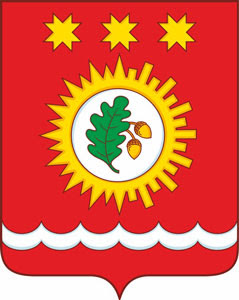
Shumerlinsky District

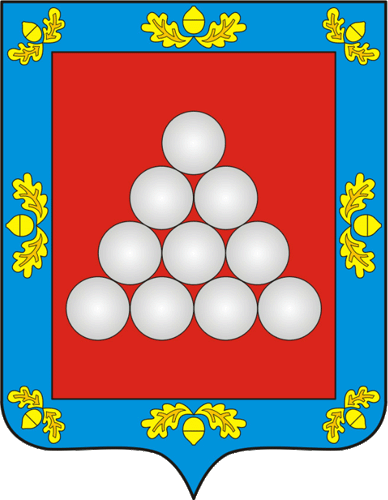
Yadrinsky District

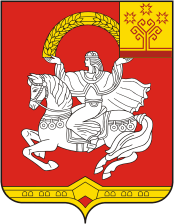
Yalchiksky District

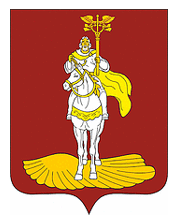
Yantikovsky District

== Dagestan ==
Makhachkala

Buynaksk

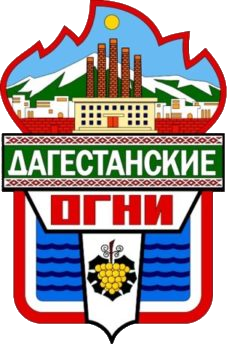
Dagestanskiye Ogni

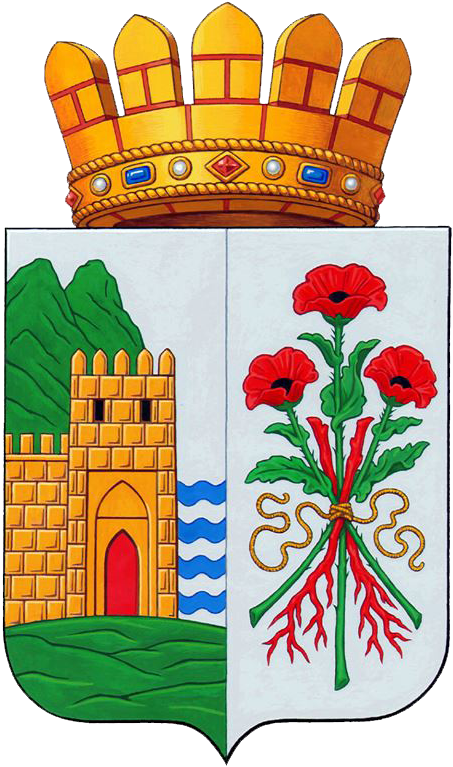
Derbent

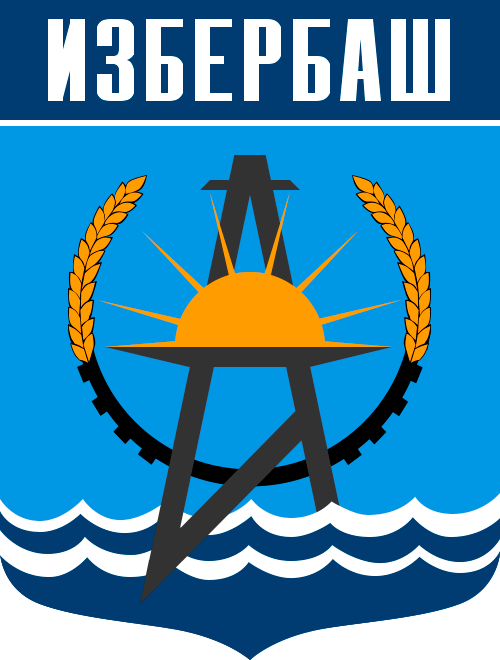
Izberbash

Kaspiysk

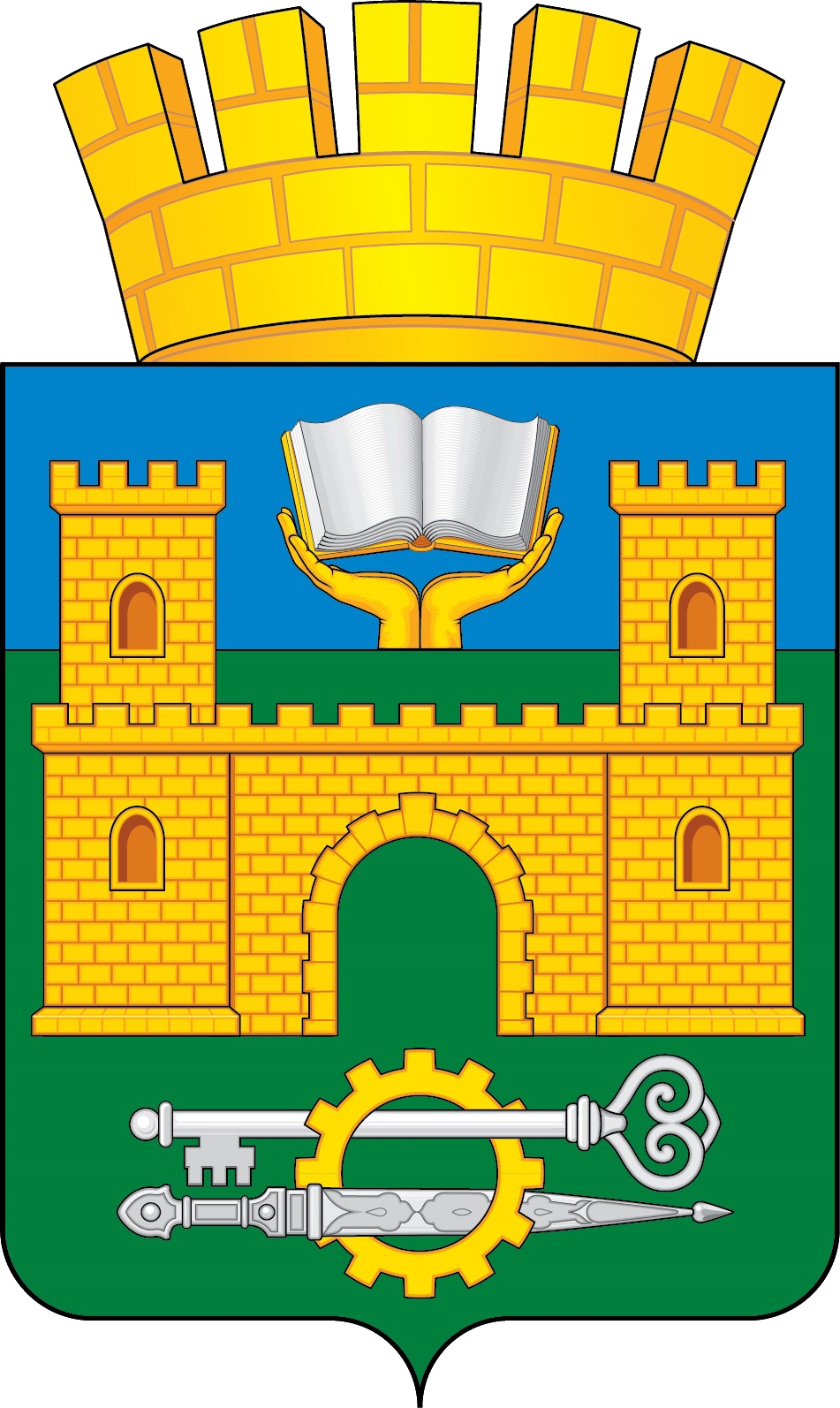
Khasavyurt

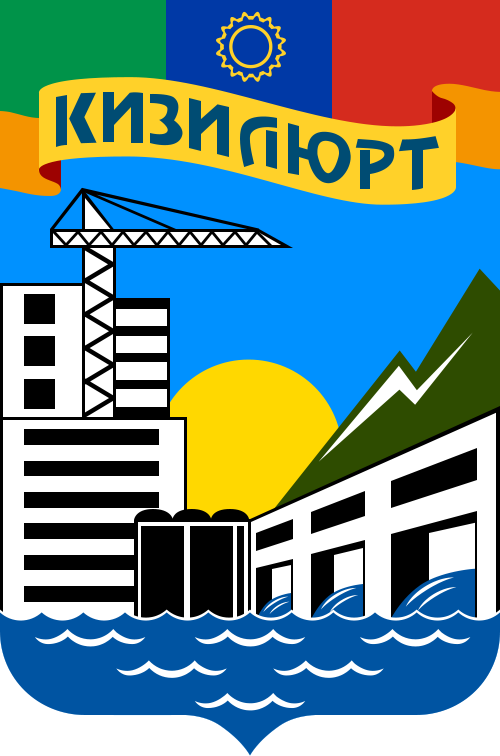
Kizilyurt

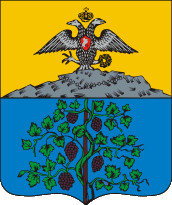
Kizlyar

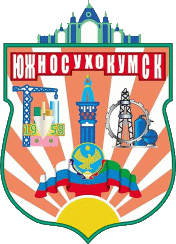
Yuzhno-Sukhokumsk

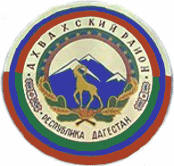
Akhvakhsky District

Akushinsky District

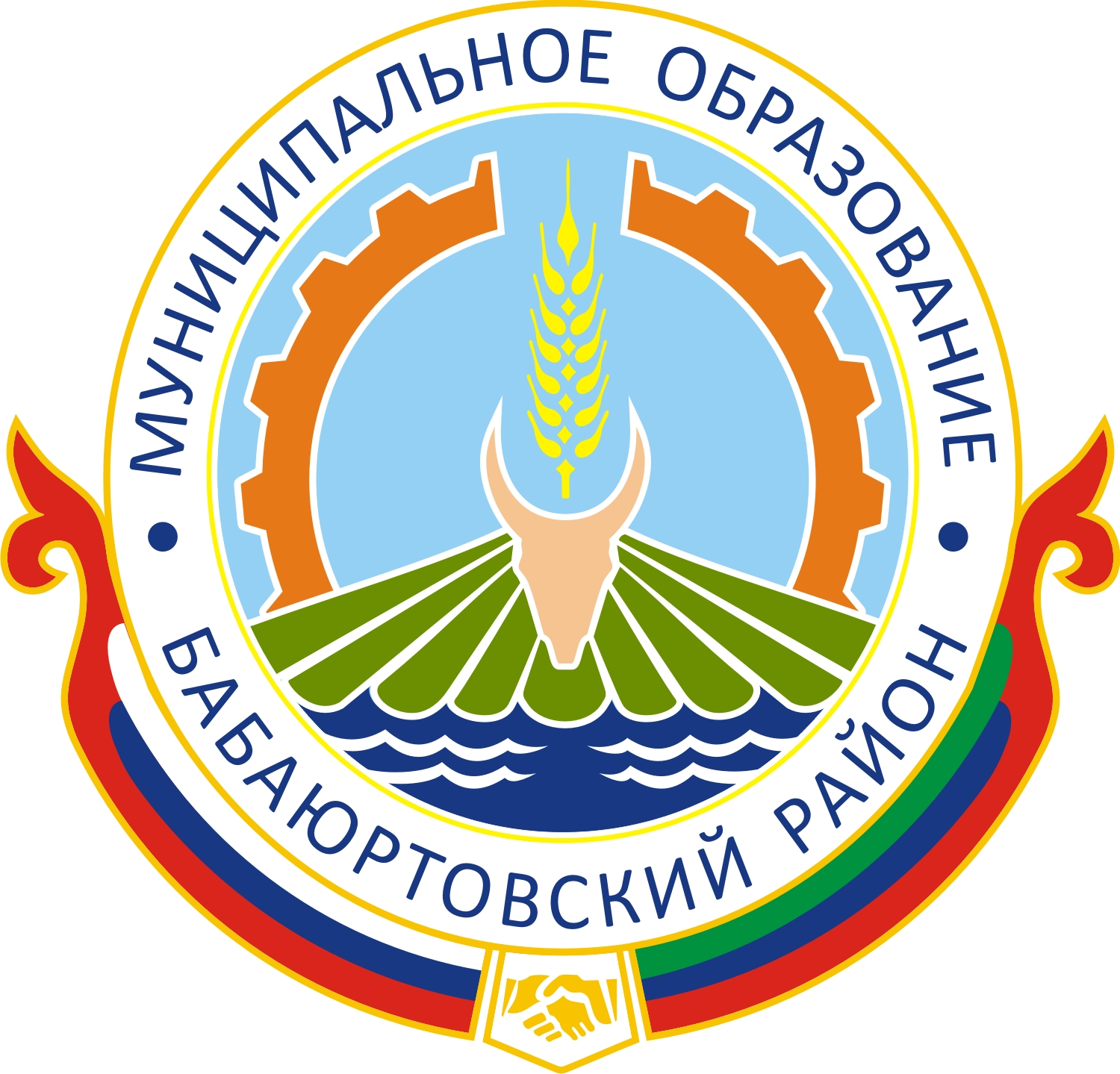
Babayurtovsky District

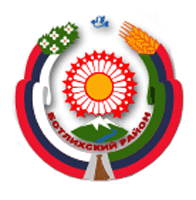
Botlikhsky District

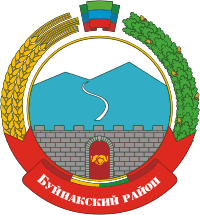
Buynaksky District

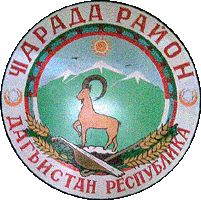
Charodinsky District

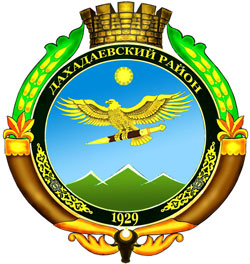
Dakhadayevsky District

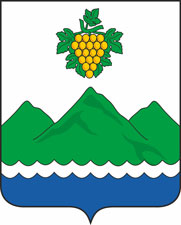
Derbentsky District

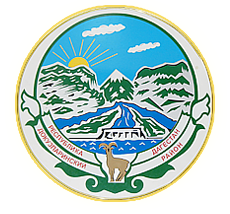
Dokuzparinsky District

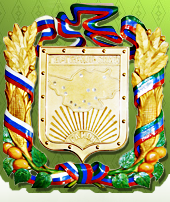
Gergebilsky District

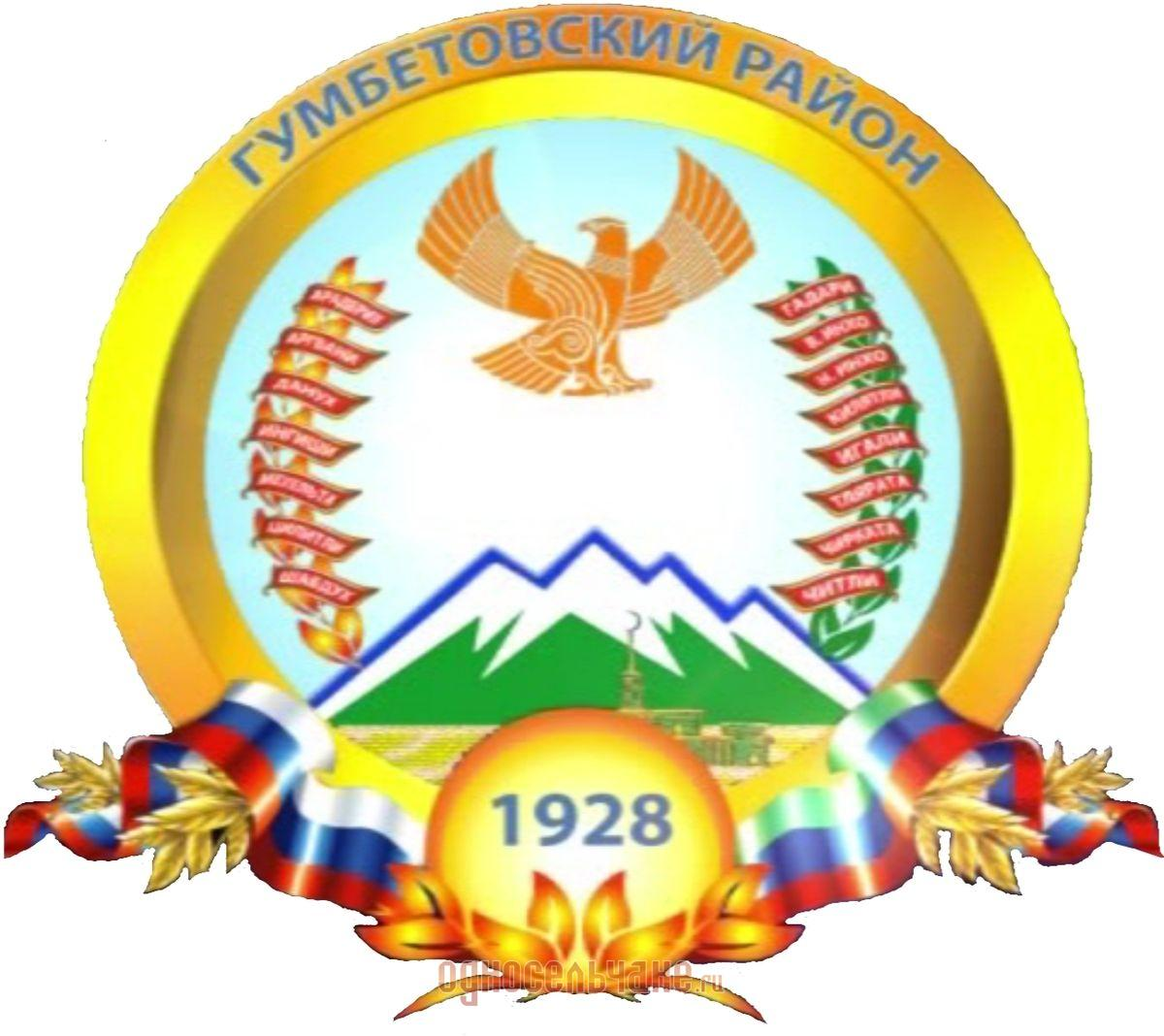
Gumbetovsky District

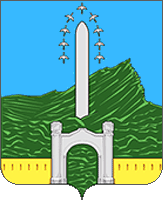
Gunibsky District

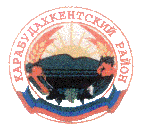
Karabudakhkentsky District

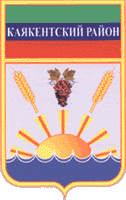
Kayakentsky District

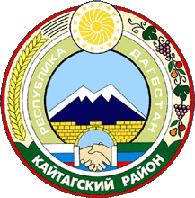
Kaytagsky District

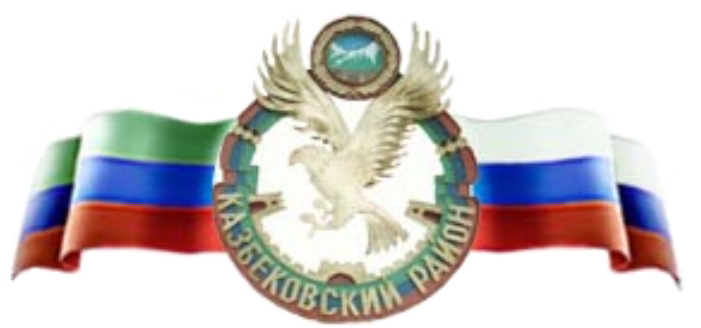
Kazbekovsky District

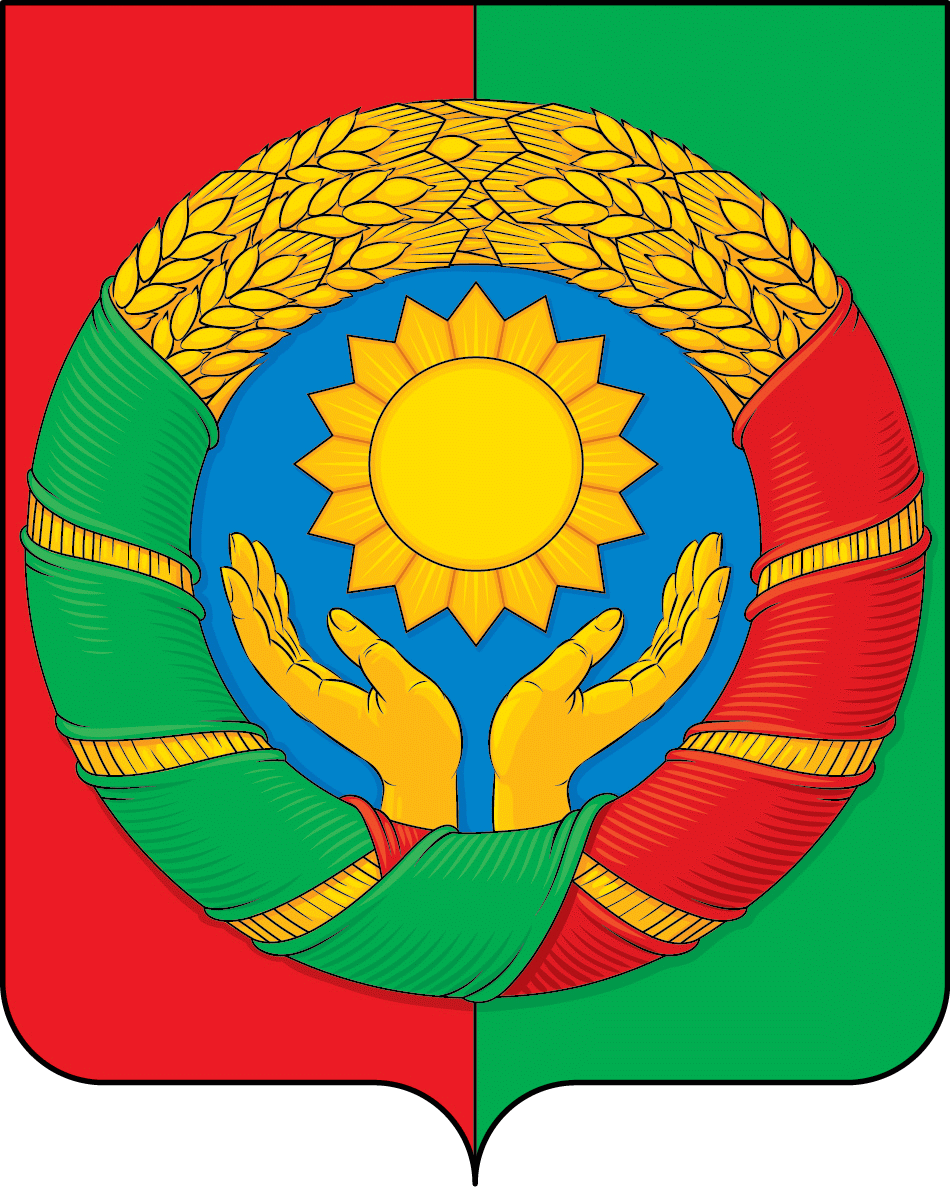
Khasavyurtovsky District

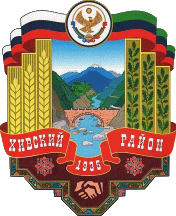
Khivsky District

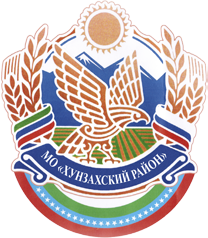
Khunzakhsky District

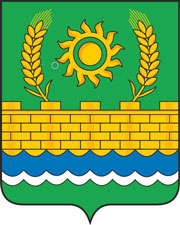
Kizilyurtovsky District

Kizlyarsky District

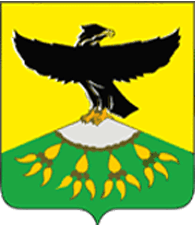
Kulinsky District

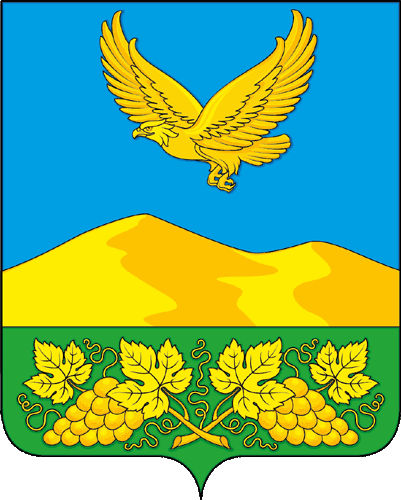
Kumtorkalinsky District

Kurakhsky District

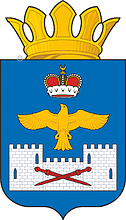
Laksky District

Levashinsky District

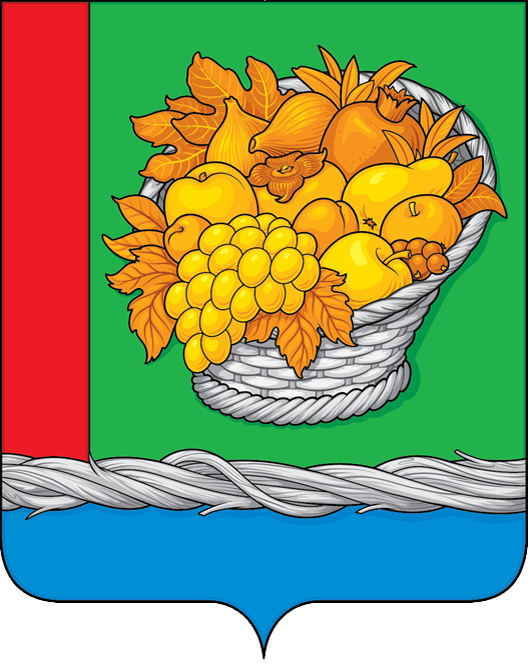
Magaramkentsky District

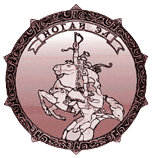
Nogaysky District

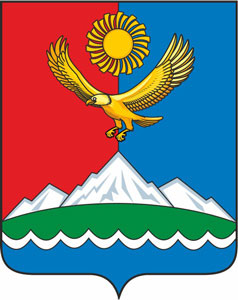
Novolaksky District

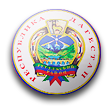
Rutulsky District

Sergokalinsky District

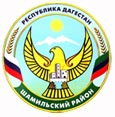
Shamilsky District

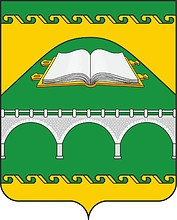
Suleyman-Stalsky District

Tabasaransky District

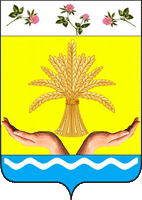
Tarumovsky District

Tlyaratinsky District

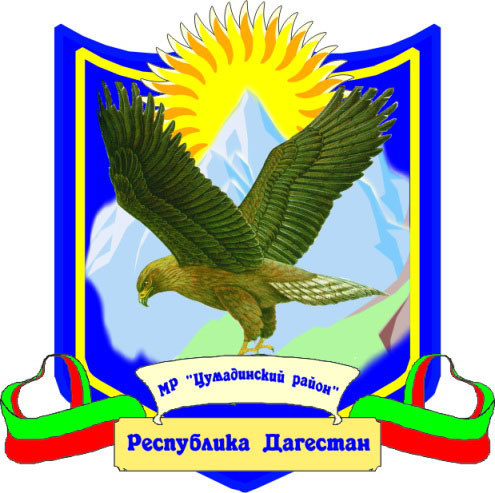
Tsumadinsky District

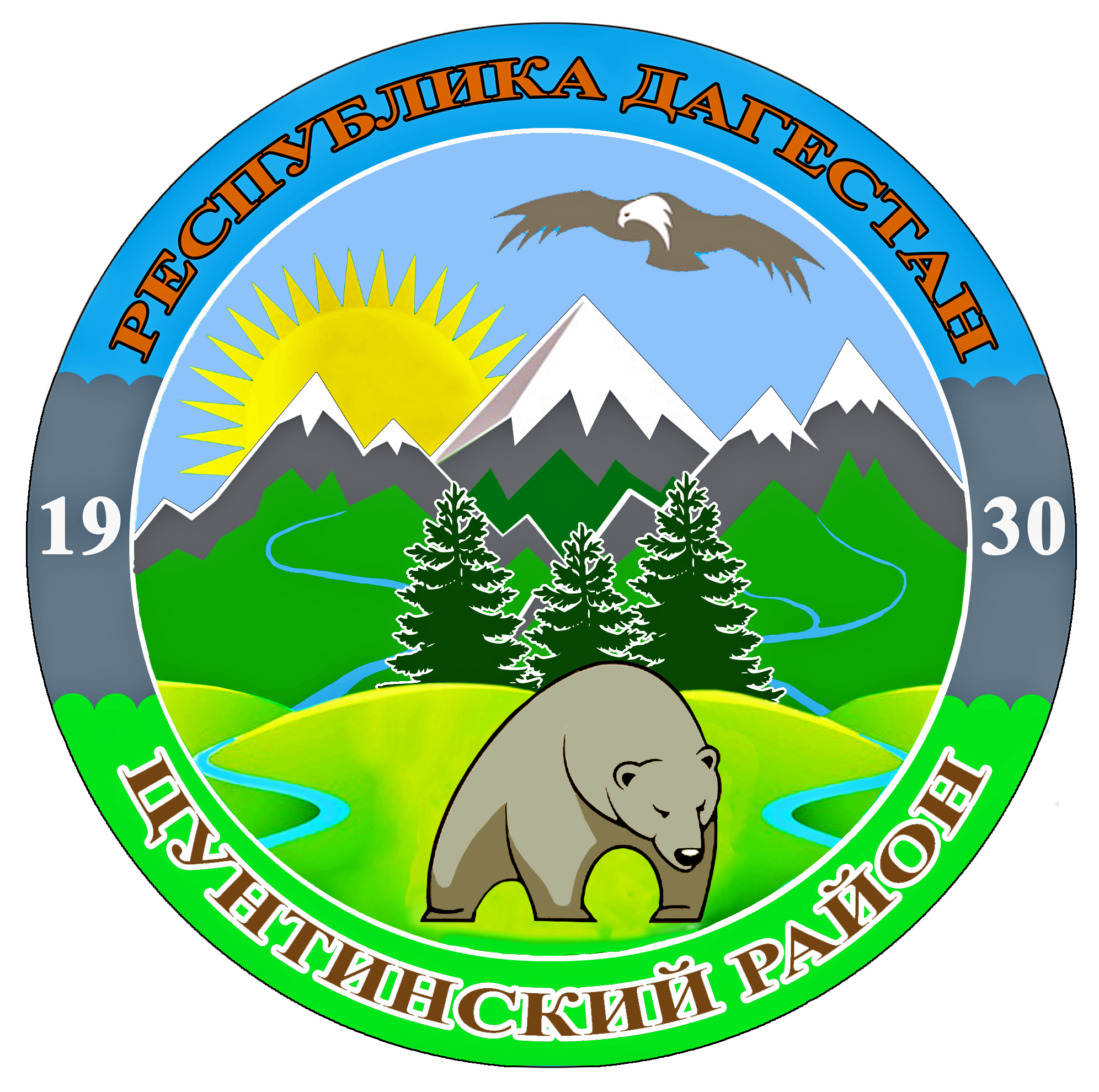
Tsuntinsky District

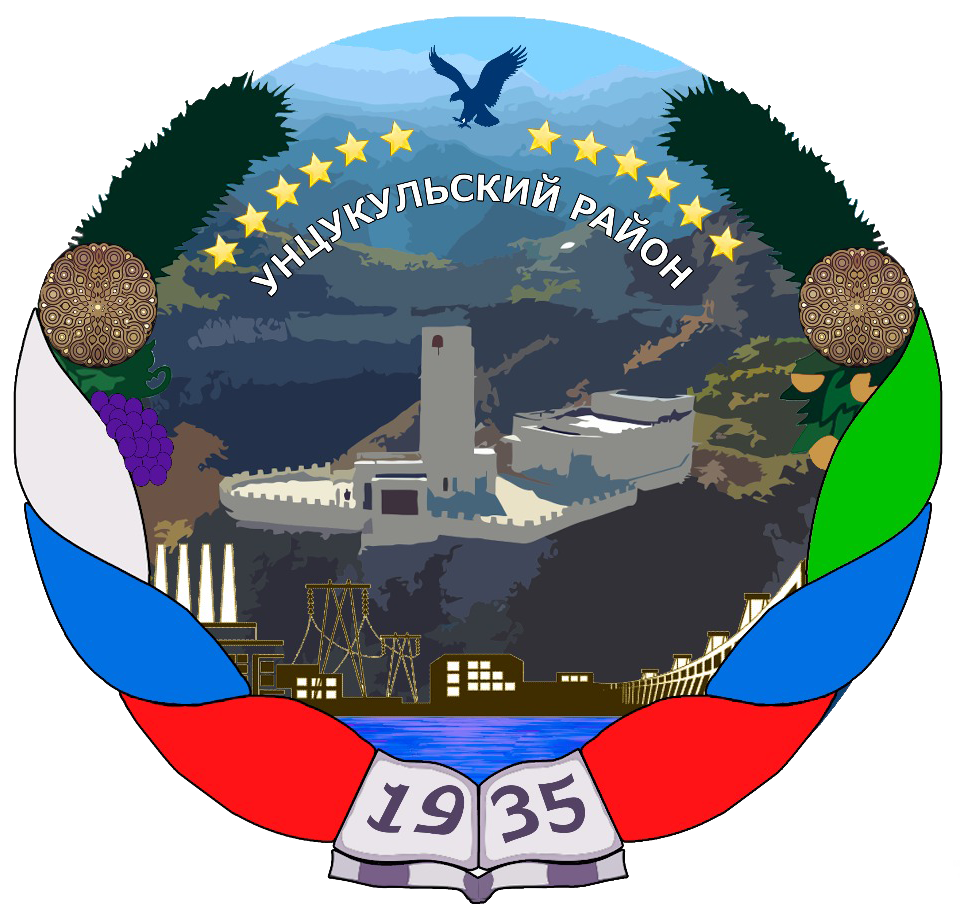
Untsukulsky District

== Ingushetia ==
Magas

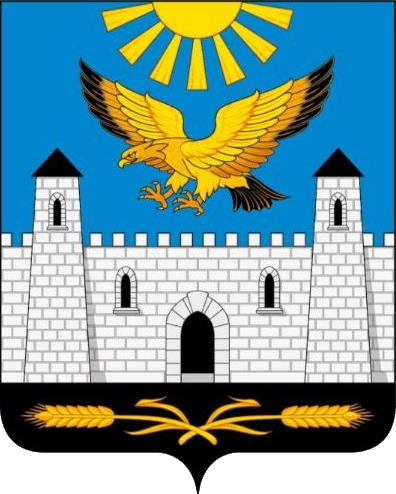
Karabulak

Malgobek

Nazran

Sunzha

Dzheyrakhsky District

Malgobeksky District

Nazranovsky District

Sunzhensky District

== Kabardino-Balkaria ==
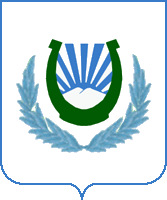
Nalchik

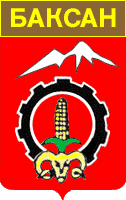
Baksan

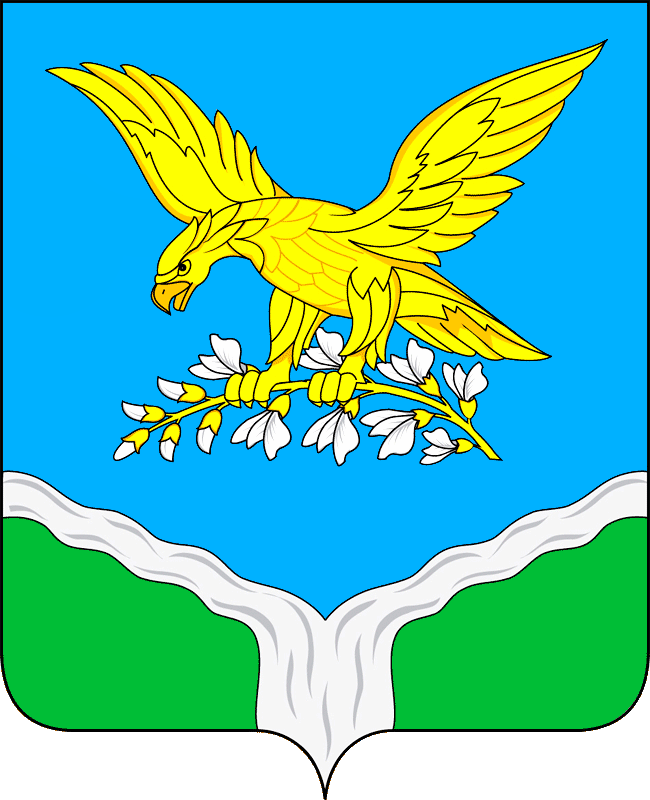
Prokhladny

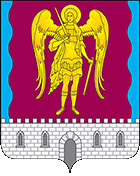
Maysky

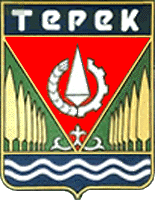
Terek

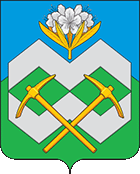
Tyrnyauz

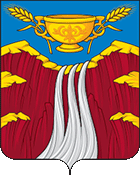
Chegemsky District

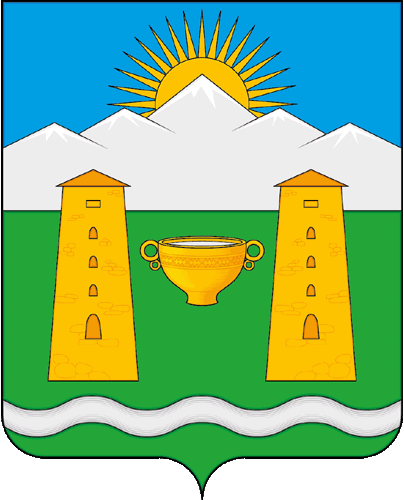
Chereksky District

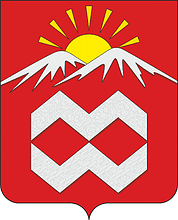
Elbrussky District

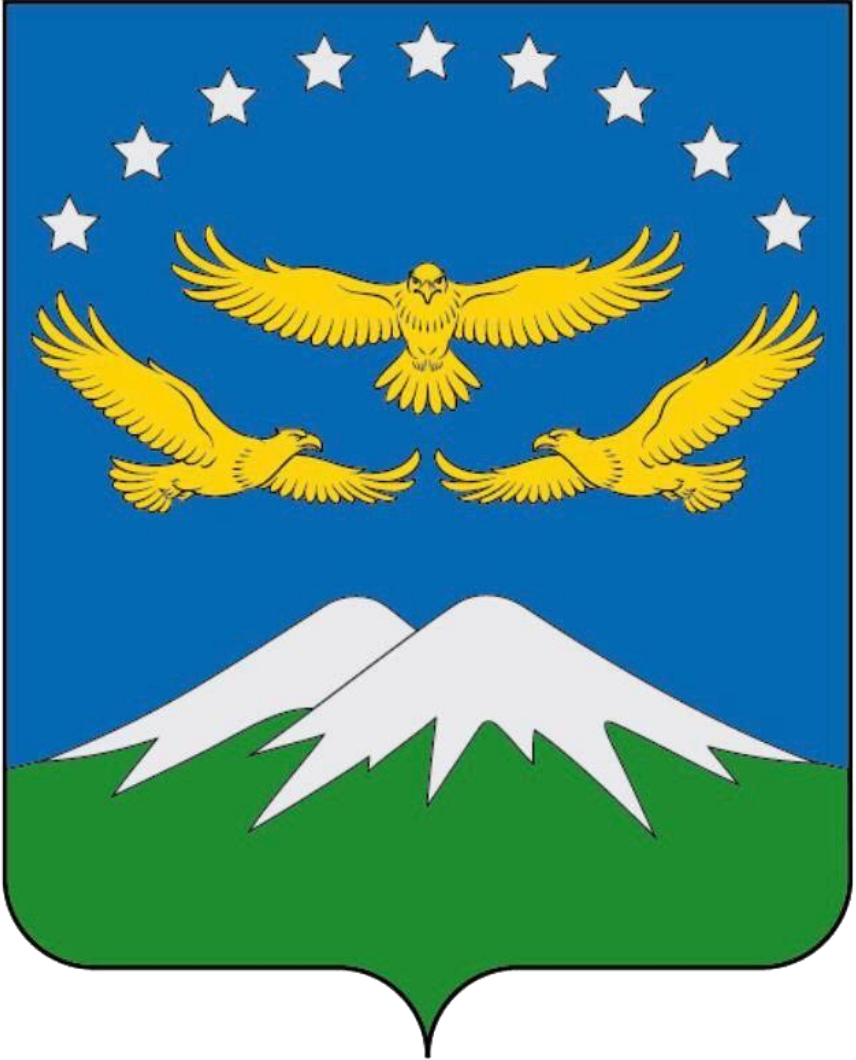
Leskensky District

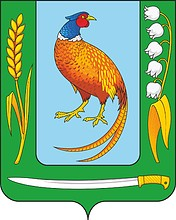
Maysky District

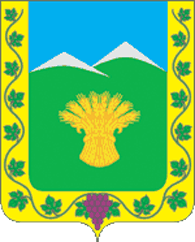
Prokhladnensky District

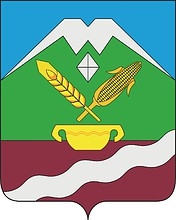
Tersky District

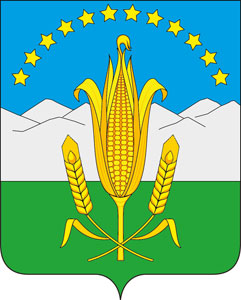
Urvansky District

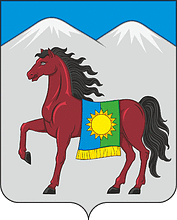
Zolsky District

== Kalmykia ==
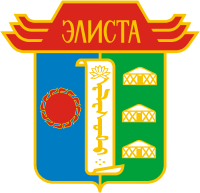
Elista

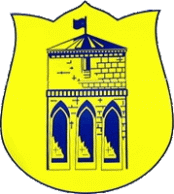
Gorodovikovsk

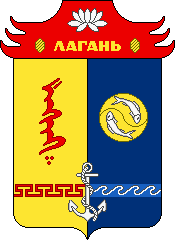
Lagan

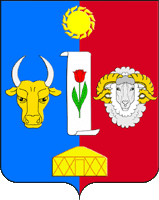
Chernozemelsky District

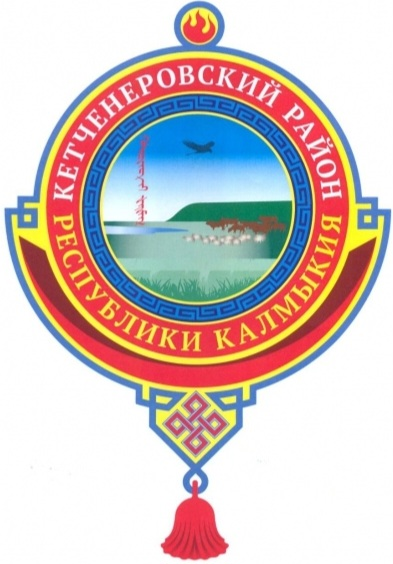
Ketchenerovsky District

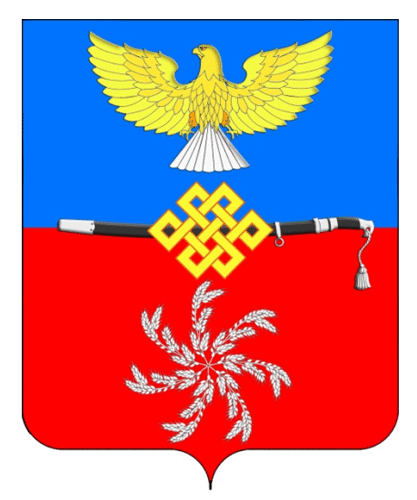
Oktyabrsky District

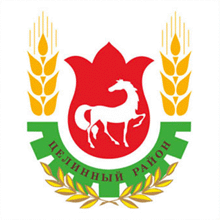
Tselinny District

== Karachay-Cherkessia ==
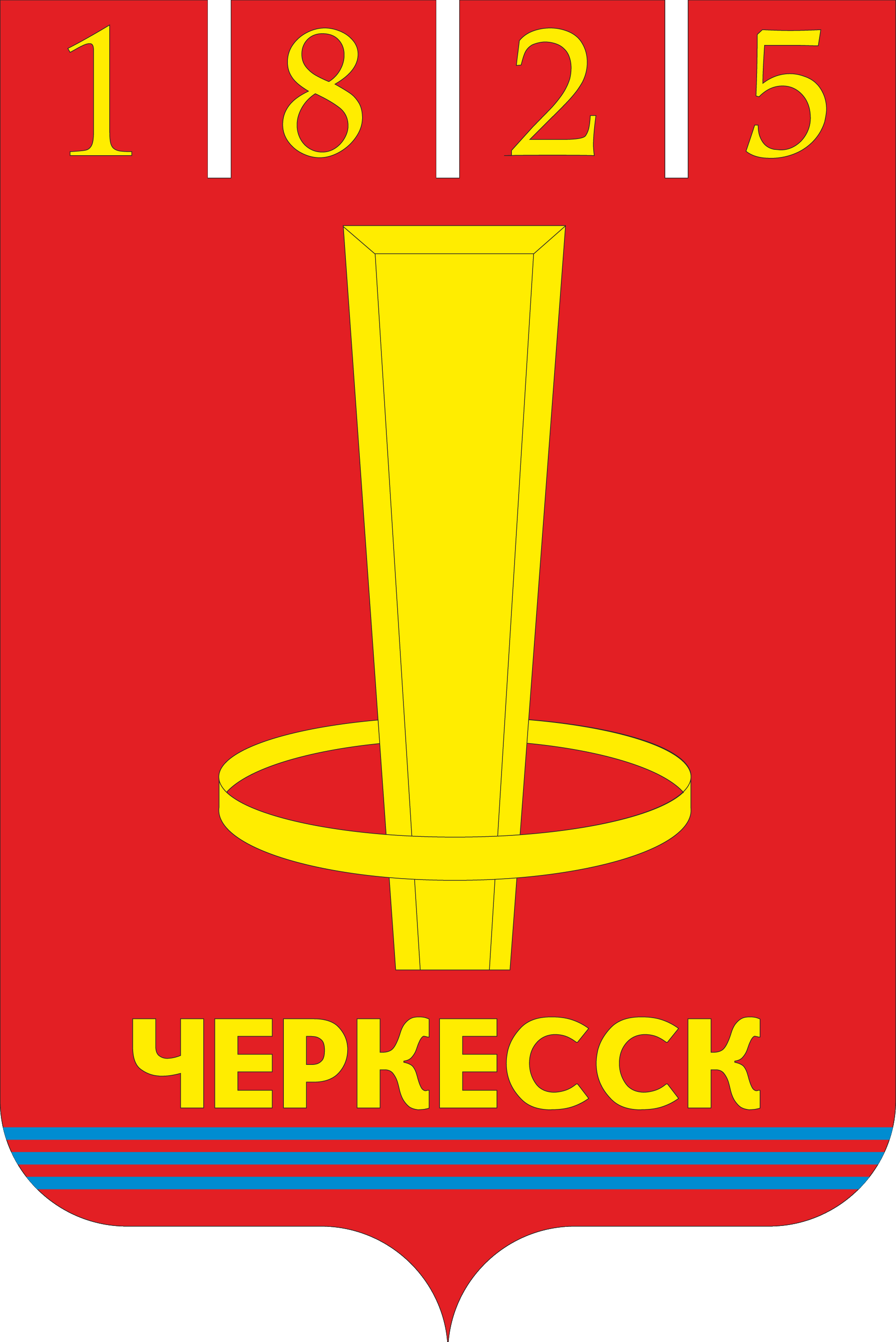
Cherkessk

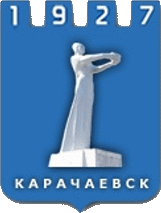
Karachayevsk

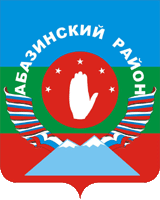
Abazinsky District

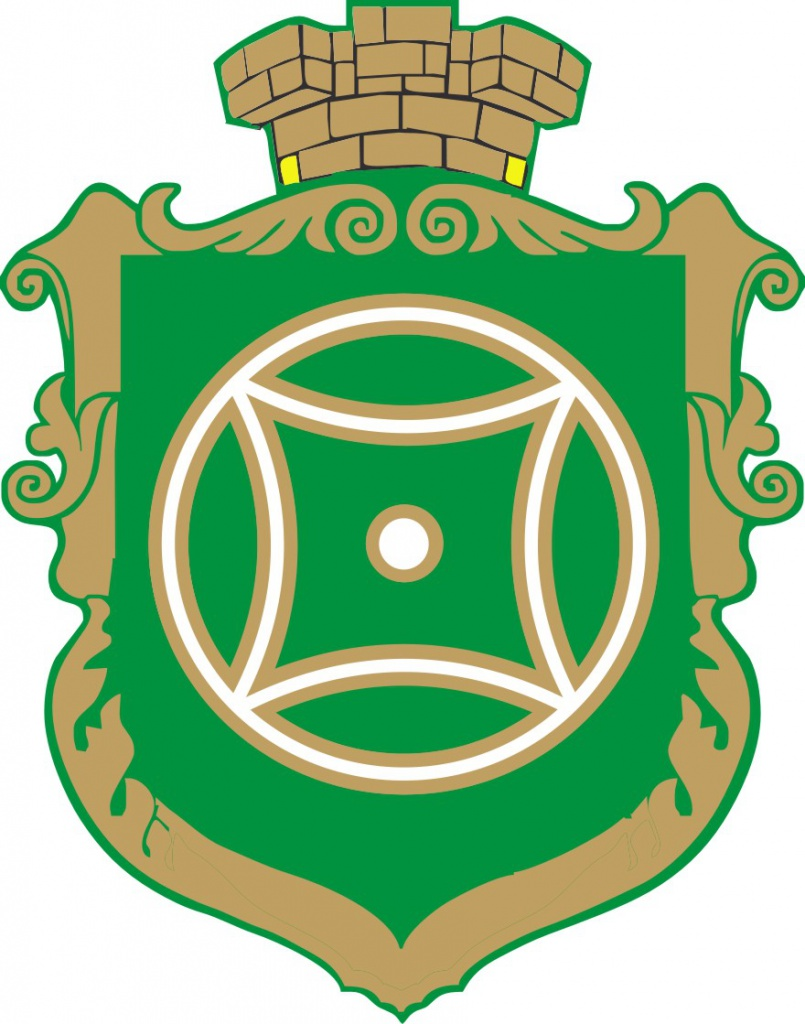
Karachayevsky District

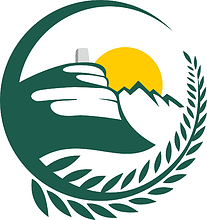
Khabezsky District

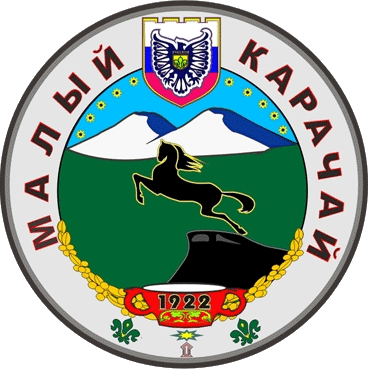
Malokarachayevsky District

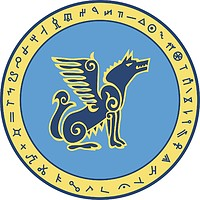
Nogaysky District

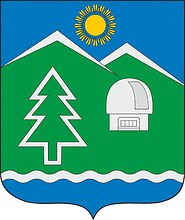
Zelenchuksky District

== Karelia ==
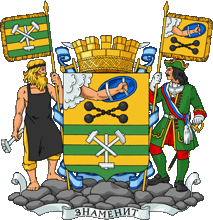
Petrozavodsk

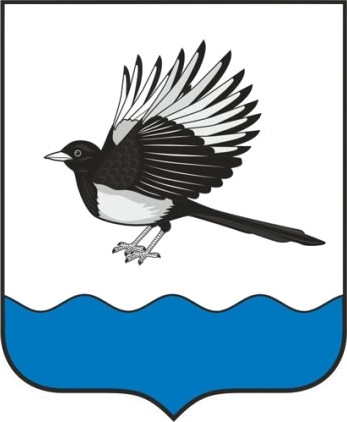
Belomorsk

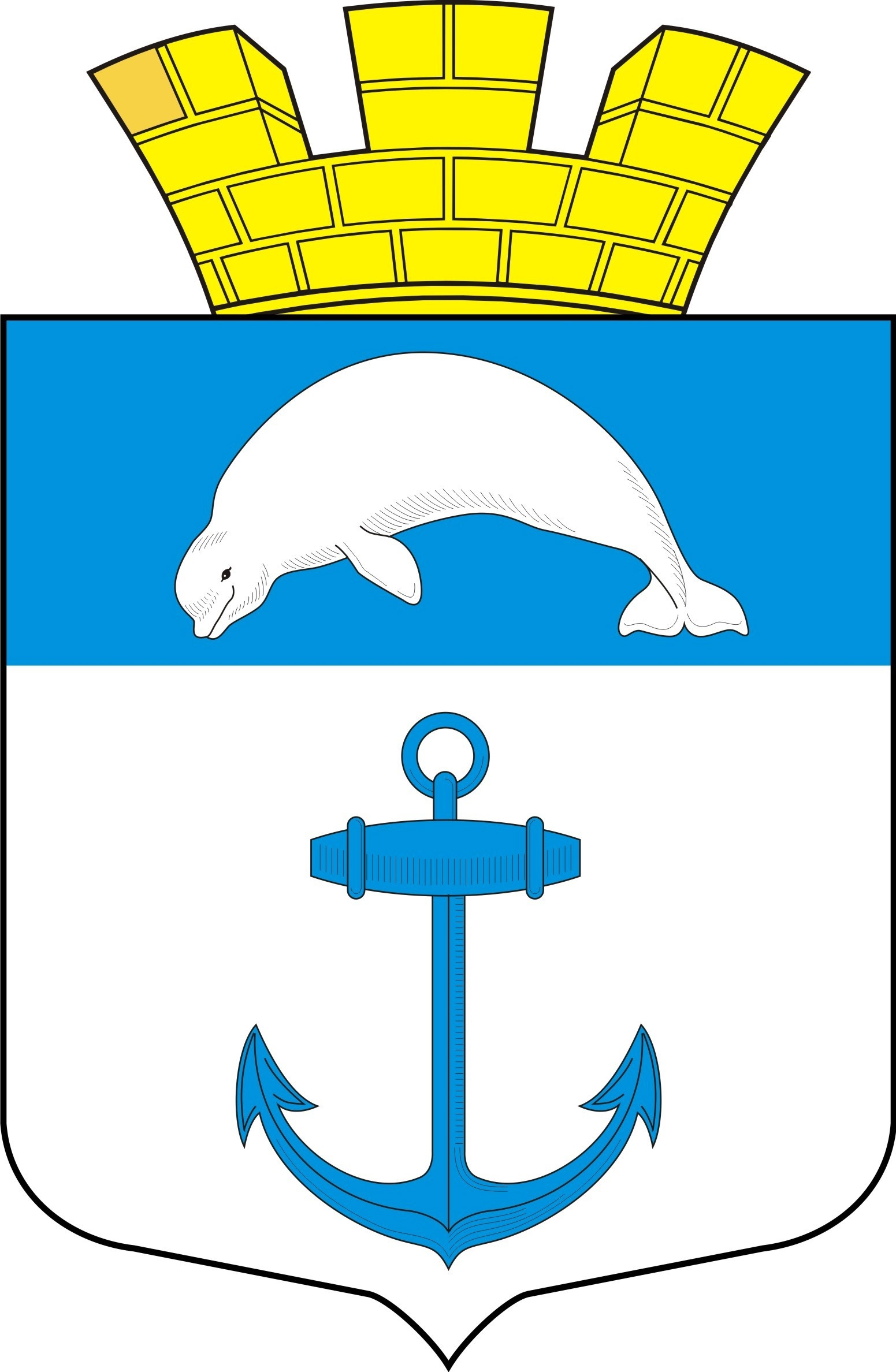
Chupa

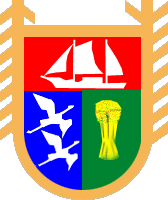
Lakhdenpokhya

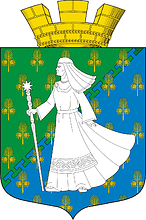
Loukhi

Kalevala

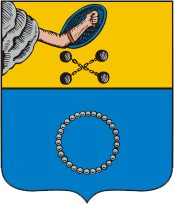
Kem

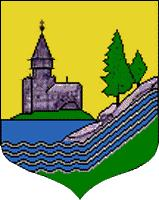
Kondopoga

Kostomuksha

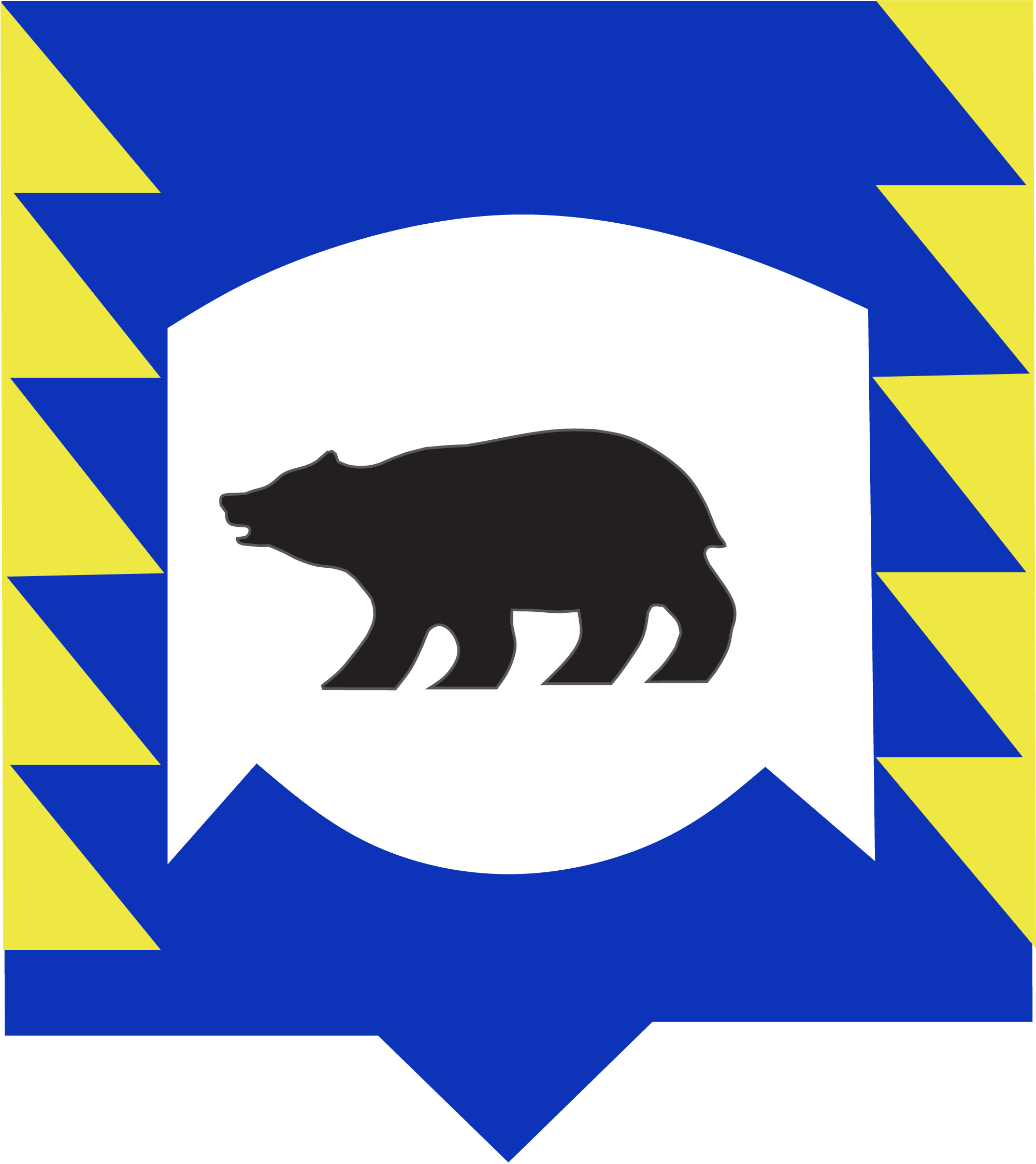
Medvezhyegorsk

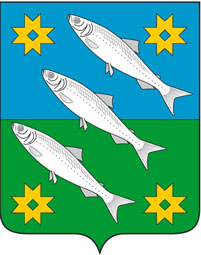
Muyezersky

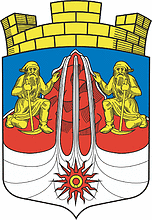
Nadvoitsy

Olonets

Pitkyaranta

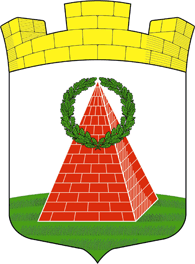
Povenets

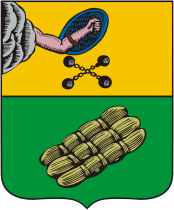
Pudozh

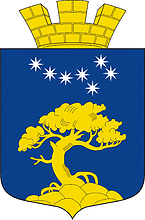
Pyaozersky

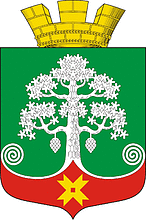
Segezha

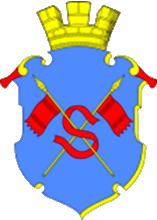
Sortavala

Suoyarvi

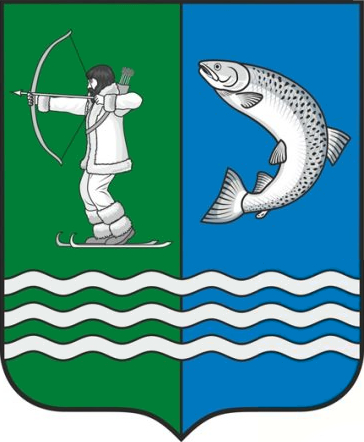
Belomorsky District

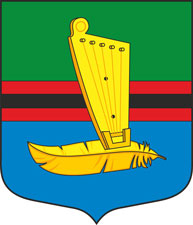
Kalevalsky District

Kemsky District

Kondopozhsky District

Lakhdenpokhsky District

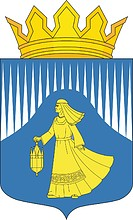
Loukhsky District

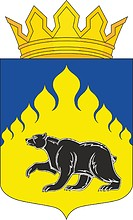
Medvezhyegorsky District

Muyezersky District

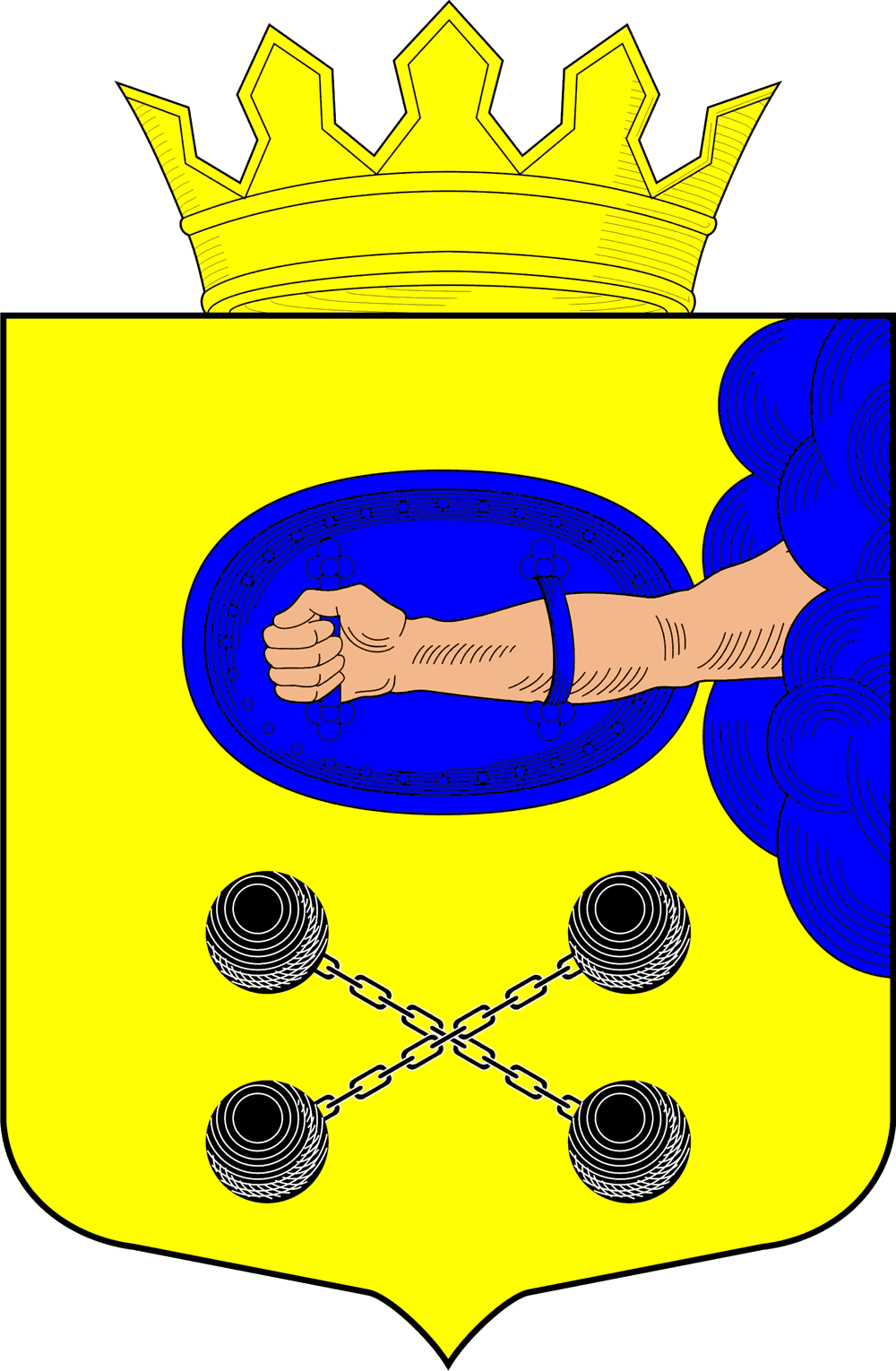
Olonetsky District

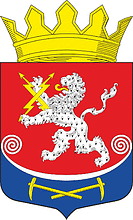
Pitkyarantsky District

Prionezhsky District

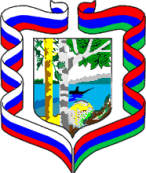
Pryazhinsky District

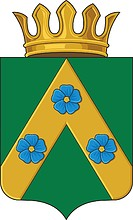
Pudozhsky District

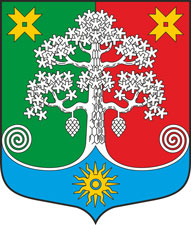
Segezhsky District

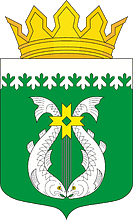
Suoyarvsky District

== Khakassia ==
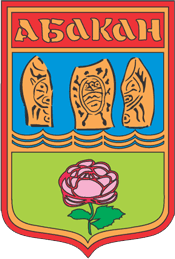
Abakan

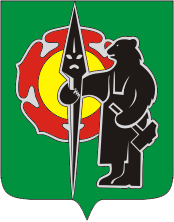
Abaza

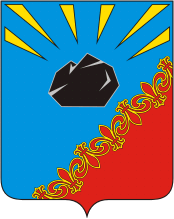
Chernogorsk

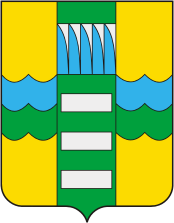
Sayanogorsk

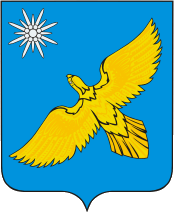
Sorsk

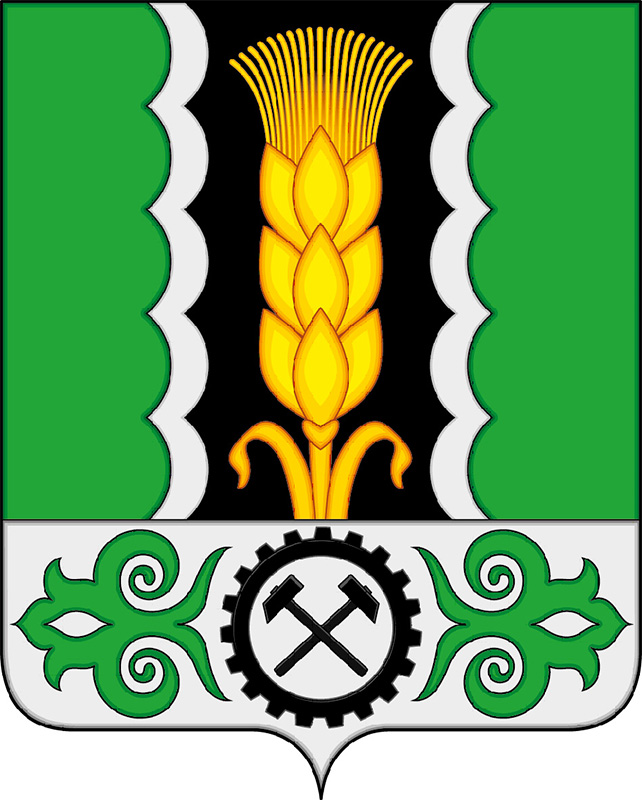
Altaysky District

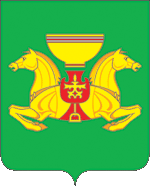
Askizsky District

Beysky District

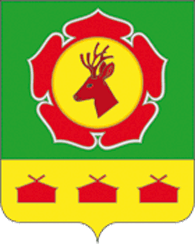
Bogradsky District

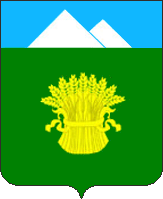
Ordzhonikidzevsky District

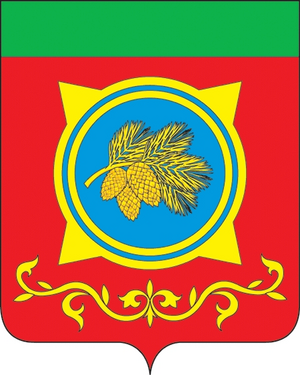
Tashtypsky District

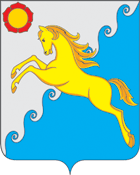
Ust-Abakansky District

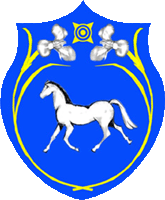
Shirinsky District

== Komi ==
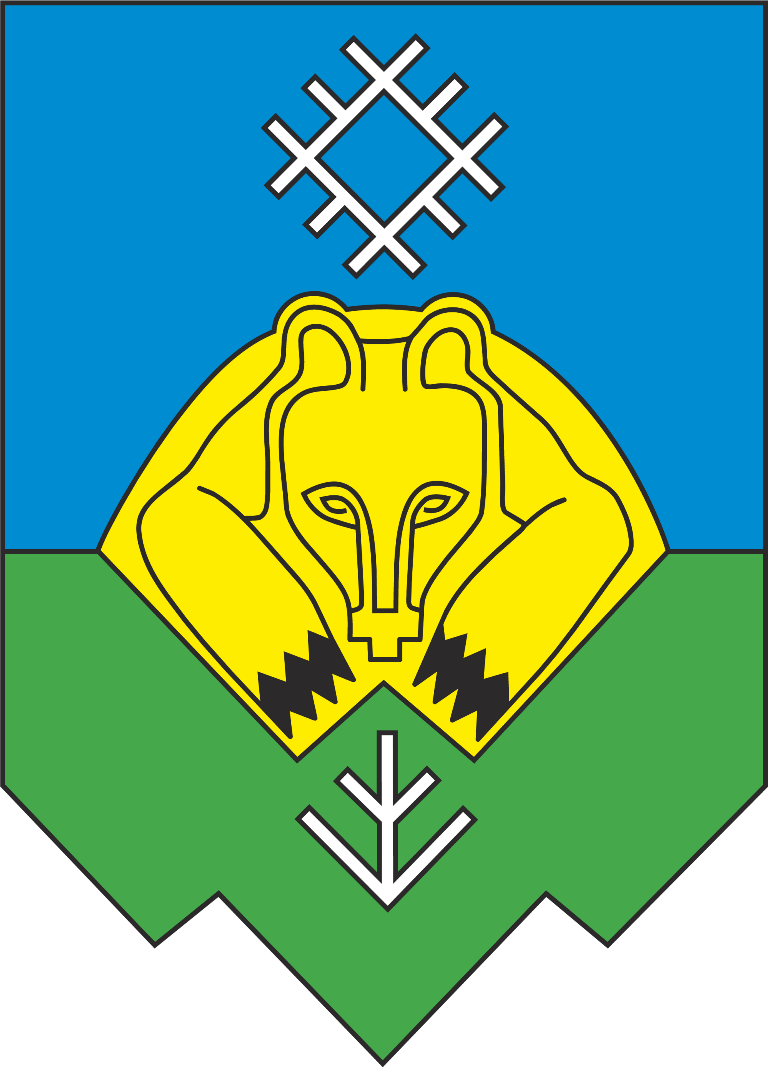
Syktyvkar

Inta

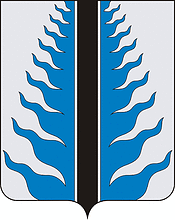
Nizhny Odes

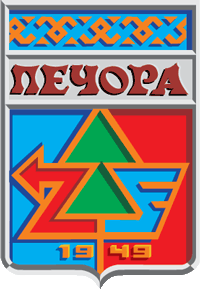
Pechora

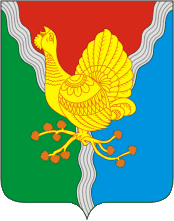
Sosnogorsk

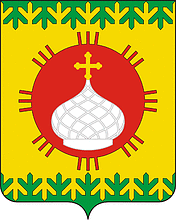
Troitsko-Pechorsk

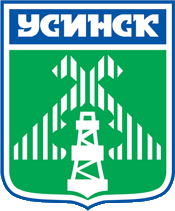
Usinsk

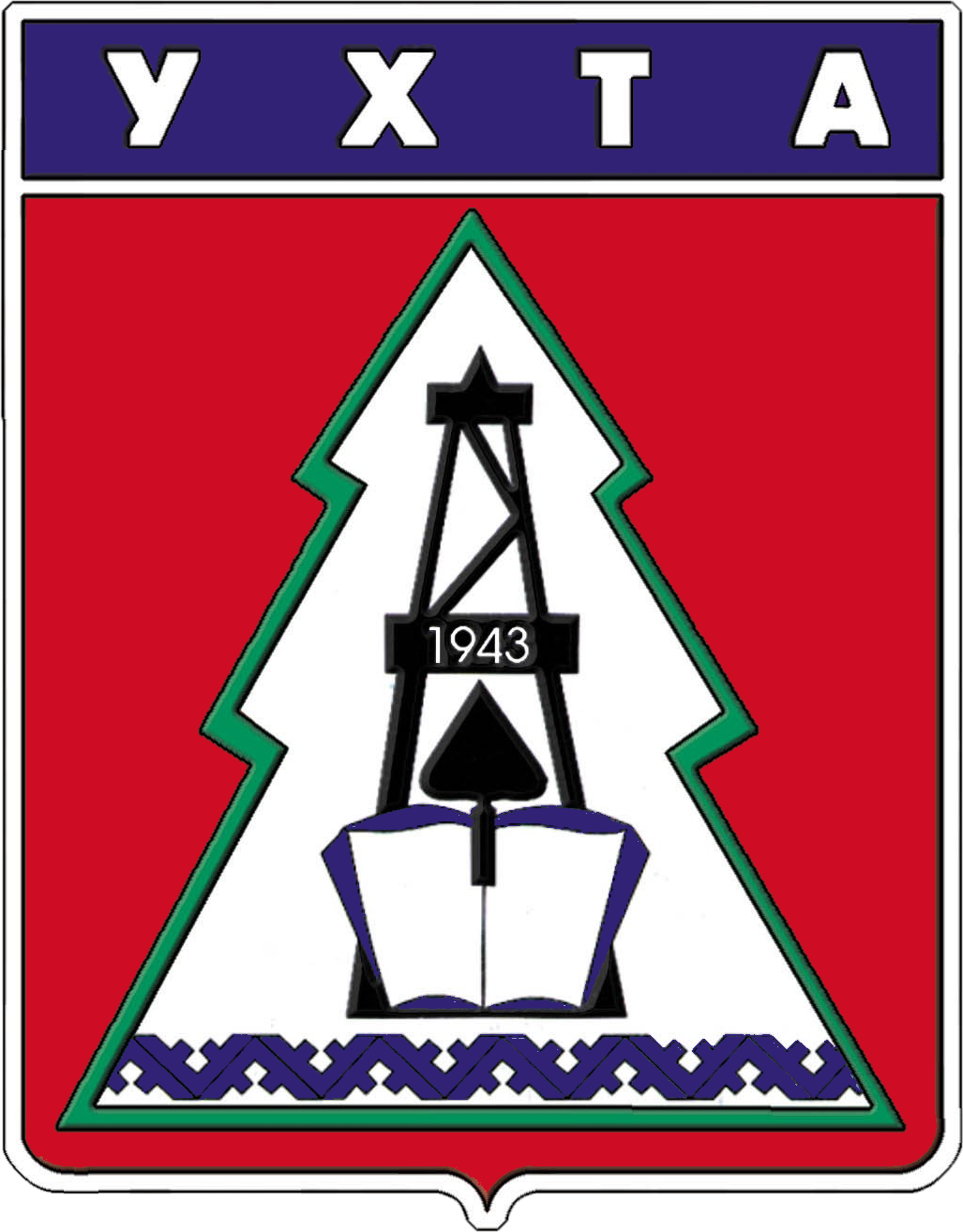
Ukhta

Vorkuta

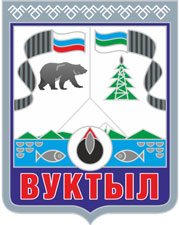
Vuktyl

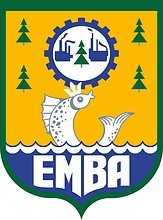
Yemva

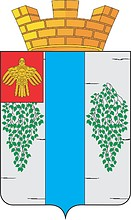
Zheshart

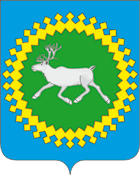
Izhemsky District

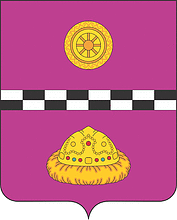
Knyazhpogostsky District

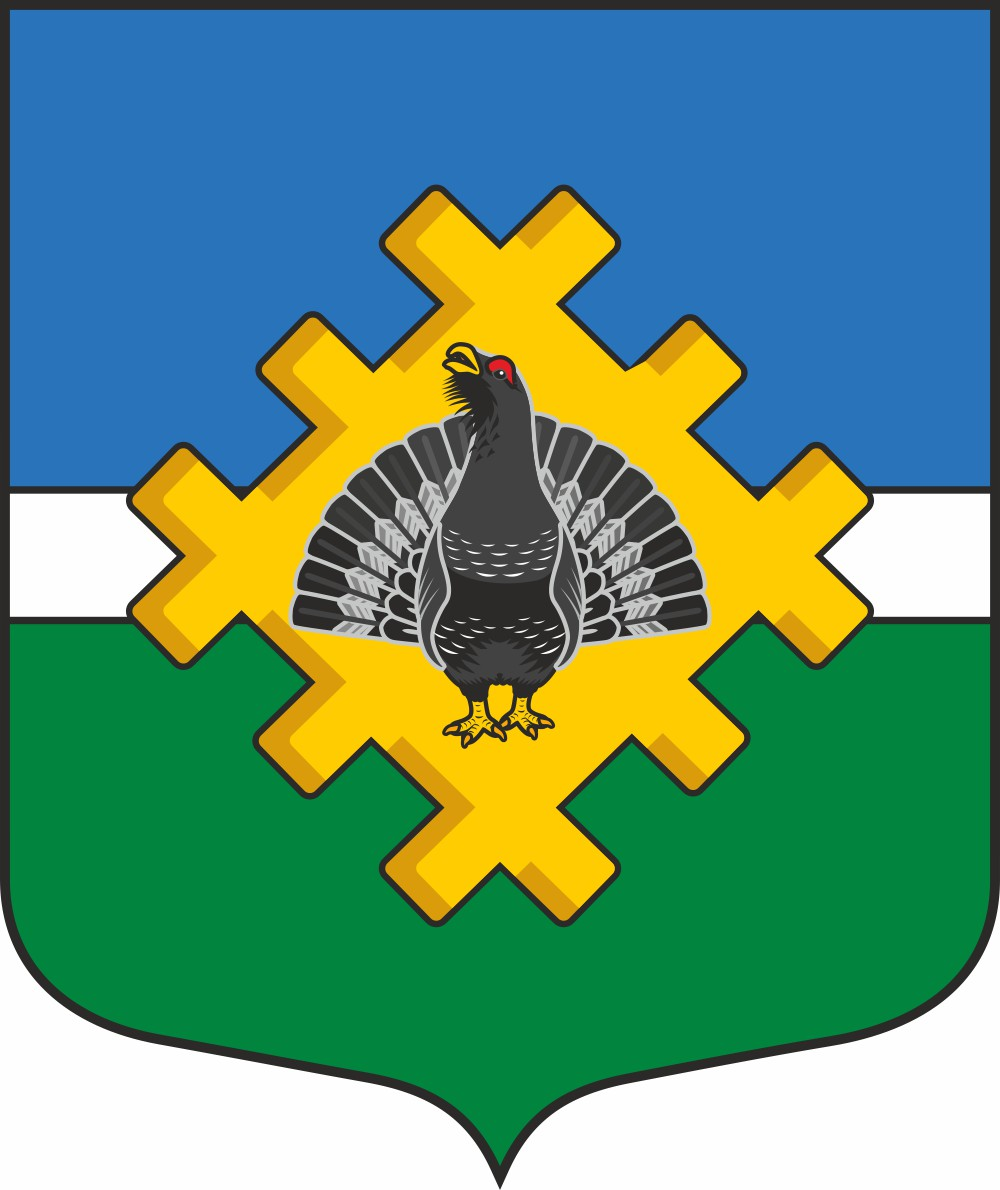
Koygorodsky District

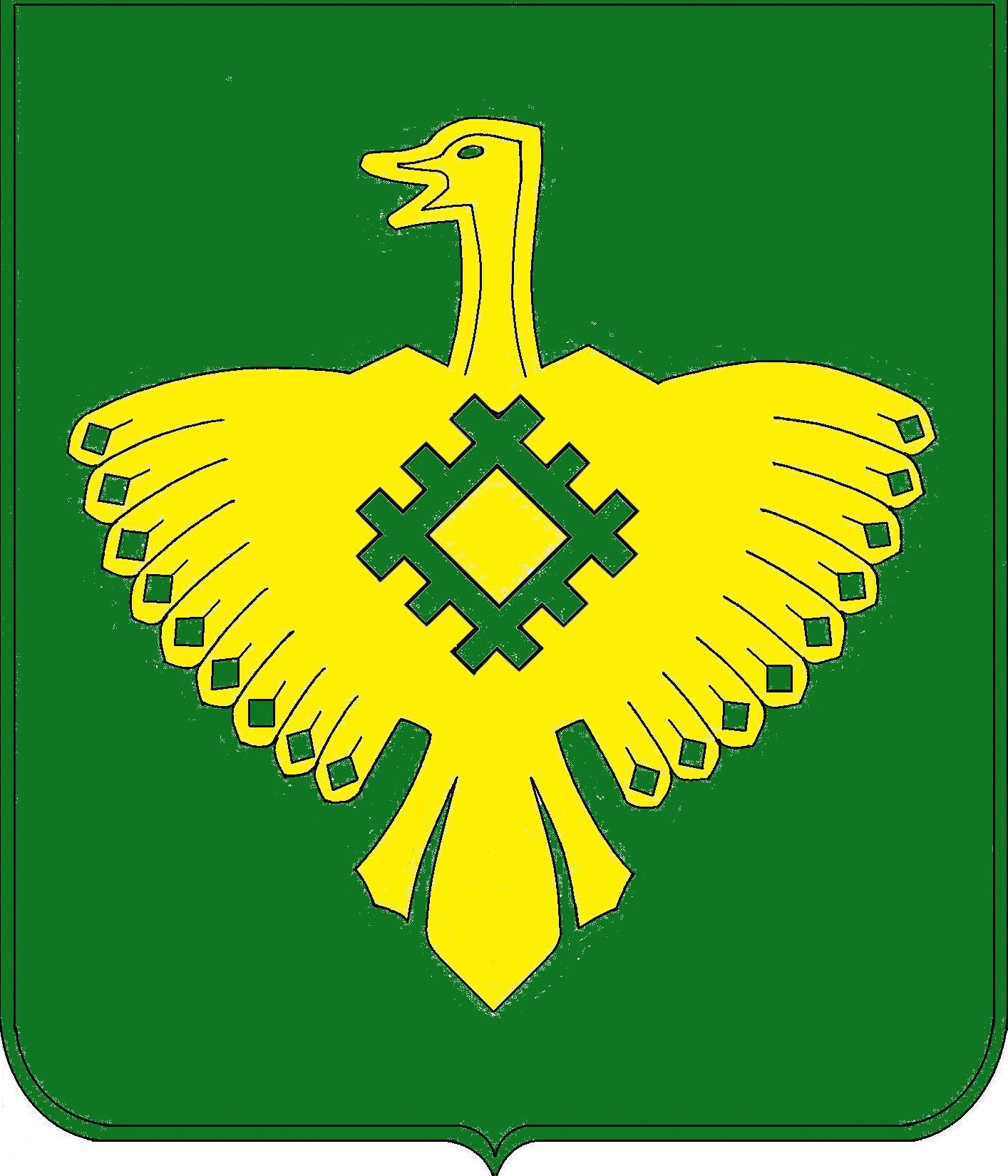
Kortkerossky District

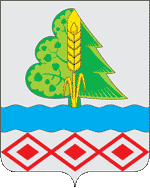
Priluzsky District

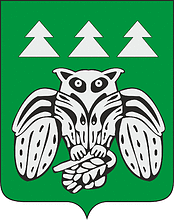
Syktyvdinsky District

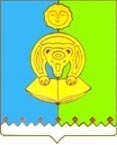
Sysolsky District

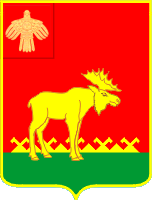
Troitsko-Pechorsky District

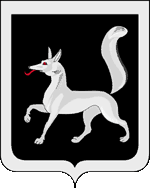
Udorsky District

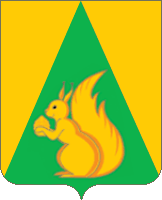
Ust-Kulomsky District

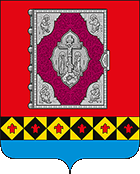
Ust-Tsilemsky District

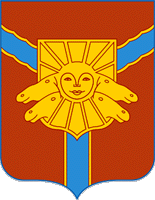
Ust-Vymsky District

== Mari El ==
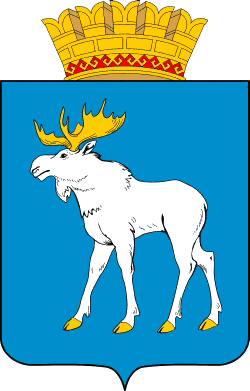
Yoshkar-Ola

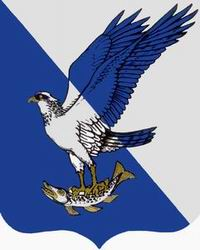
Volzhsk

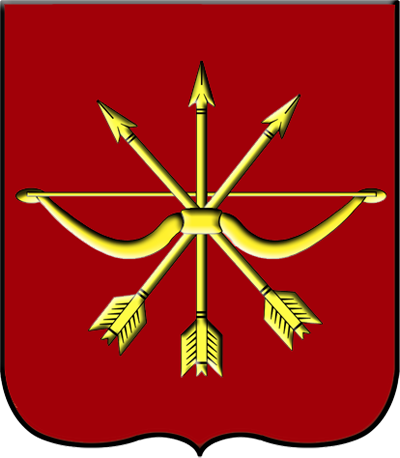
Kozmodemyansk

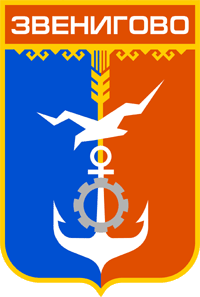
Zvenigovo

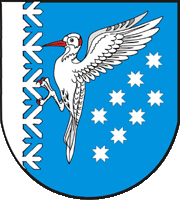
Volzhsky District

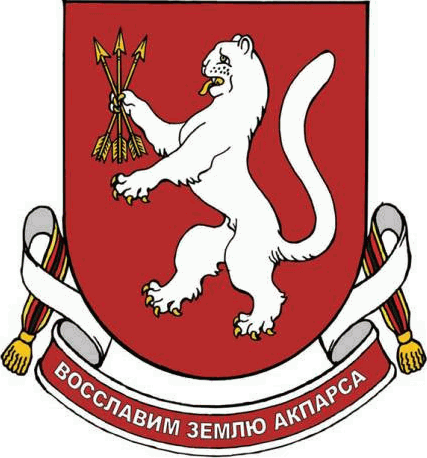
Gornomariysky District

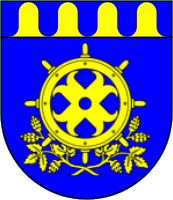
Zvenigovsky District

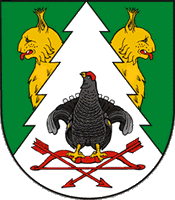
Kilemarsky District

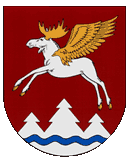
Kuzhenersky District

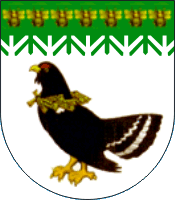
Mari-Tureksky District

Medvedevsky District

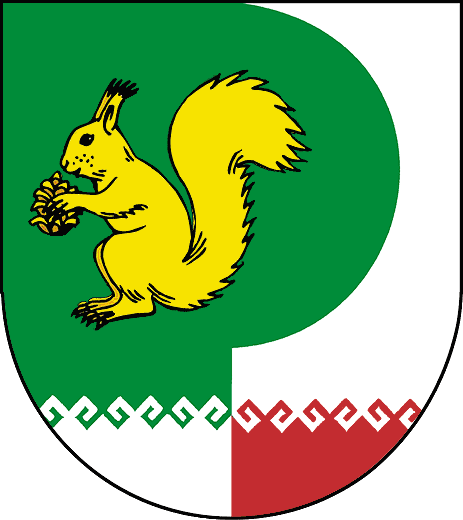
Morkinsky District

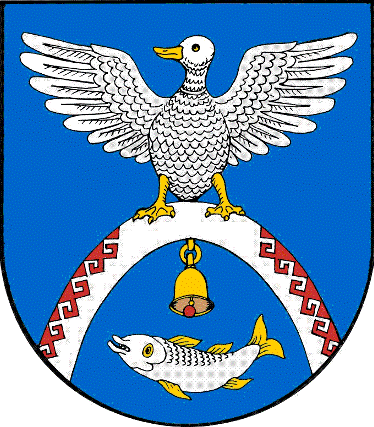
Novotoryalsky District

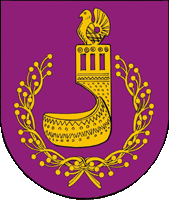
Orshansky District

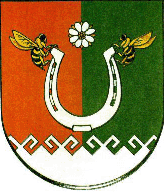
Paranginsky District

Sernursky District

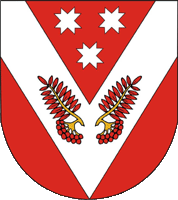
Sovetsky District

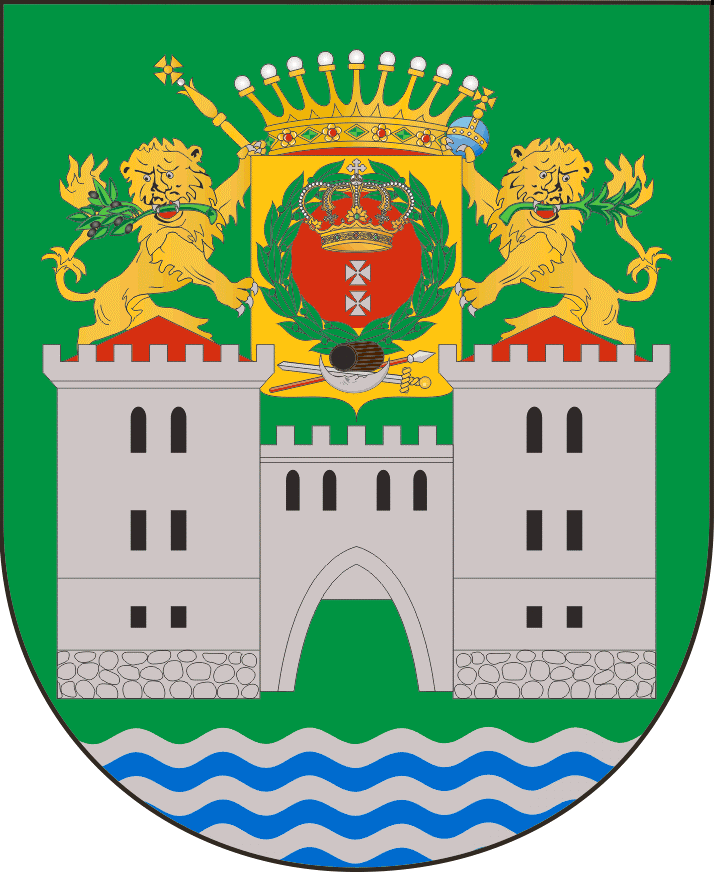
Yurinsky District

== Mordovia ==
Saransk

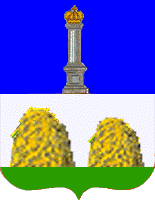
Ardatov

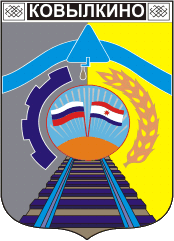
Kovylkino

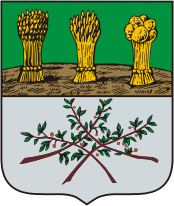
Krasnoslobodsk

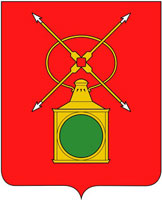
Ruzayevka

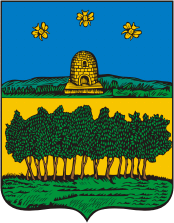
Temnikov

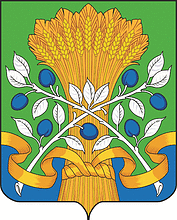
Krasnoslobodsky District

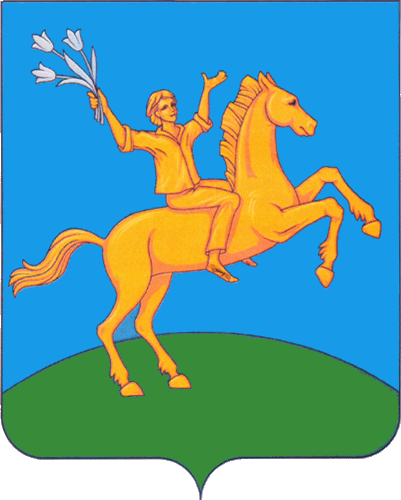
Lyambirsky District

== North Ossetia–Alania ==
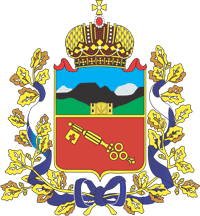
Vladikavkaz

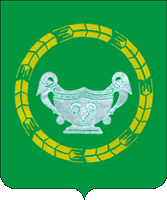
Kirovsky District

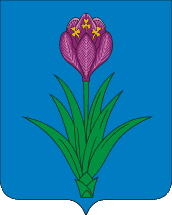
Mozdok

== Sakha ==
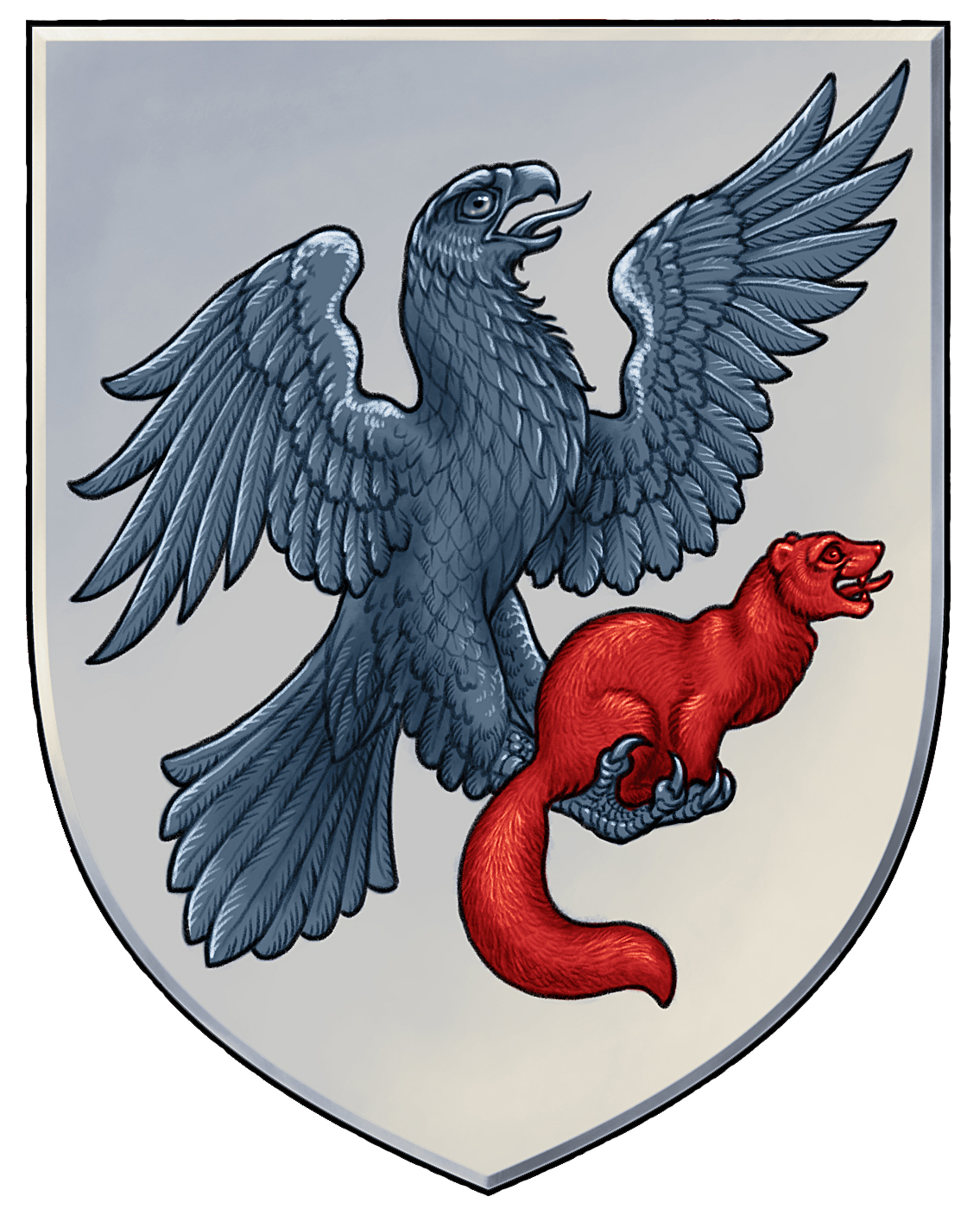
Yakutsk

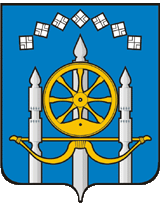
Berkakit

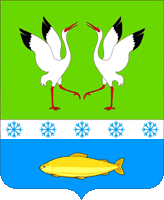
Chokurdakh

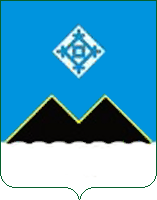
Dzhebariki-Khaya

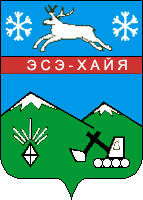
Ese-Khayya

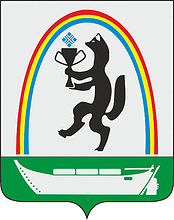
Lensk

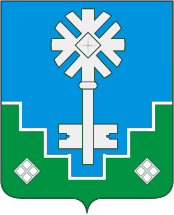
Mirny

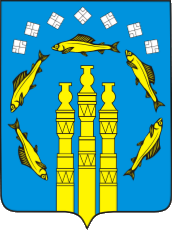
Neryungri

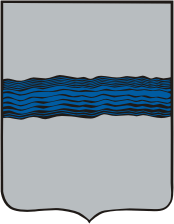
Olyokminsk

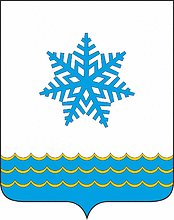
Pokrovsk

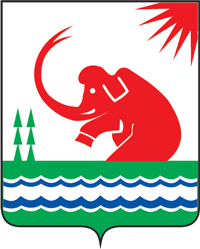
Srednekolymsk

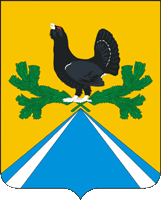
Tommot

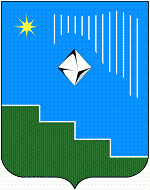
Udachny

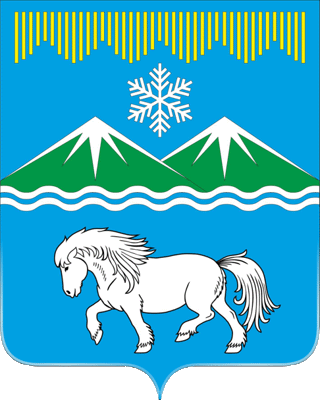
Verkhoyansk

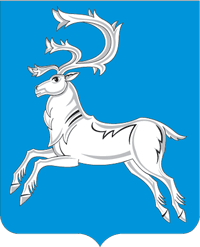
Vilyuysk

Zhatay

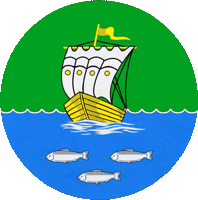
Zyryanka

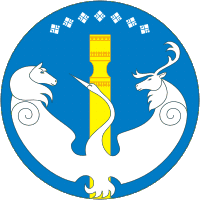
Abyysky District

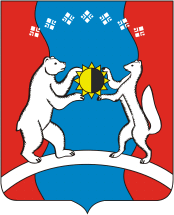
Aldansky District

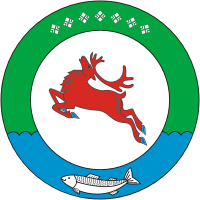
Allaikhovsky District

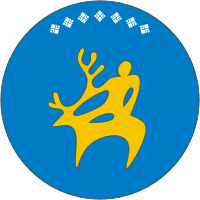
Anabarsky District

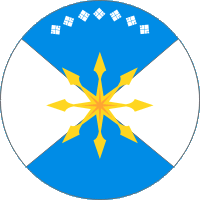
Bulunsky District

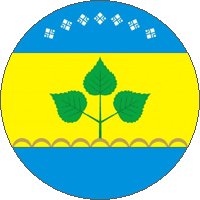
Churapchinsky District

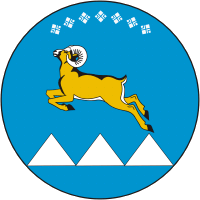
Eveno-Bytantaysky National District

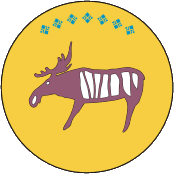
Gorny District

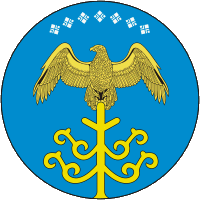
Khangalassky District

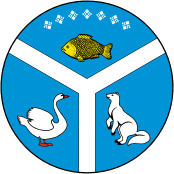
Kobyaysky District

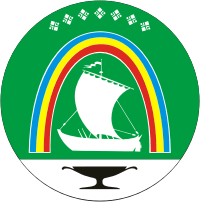
Lensky District

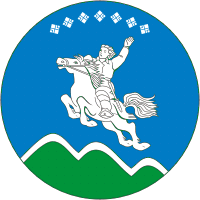
Megino-Kangalassky District

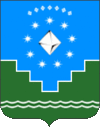
Mirninsky District

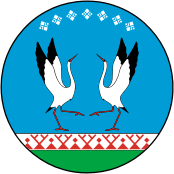
Momsky District

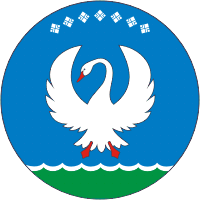
Namsky District

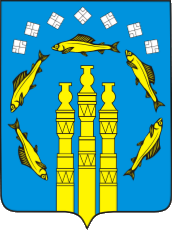
Neryungrinsky District

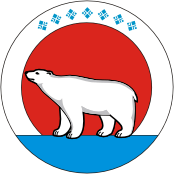
Nizhnekolymsky District

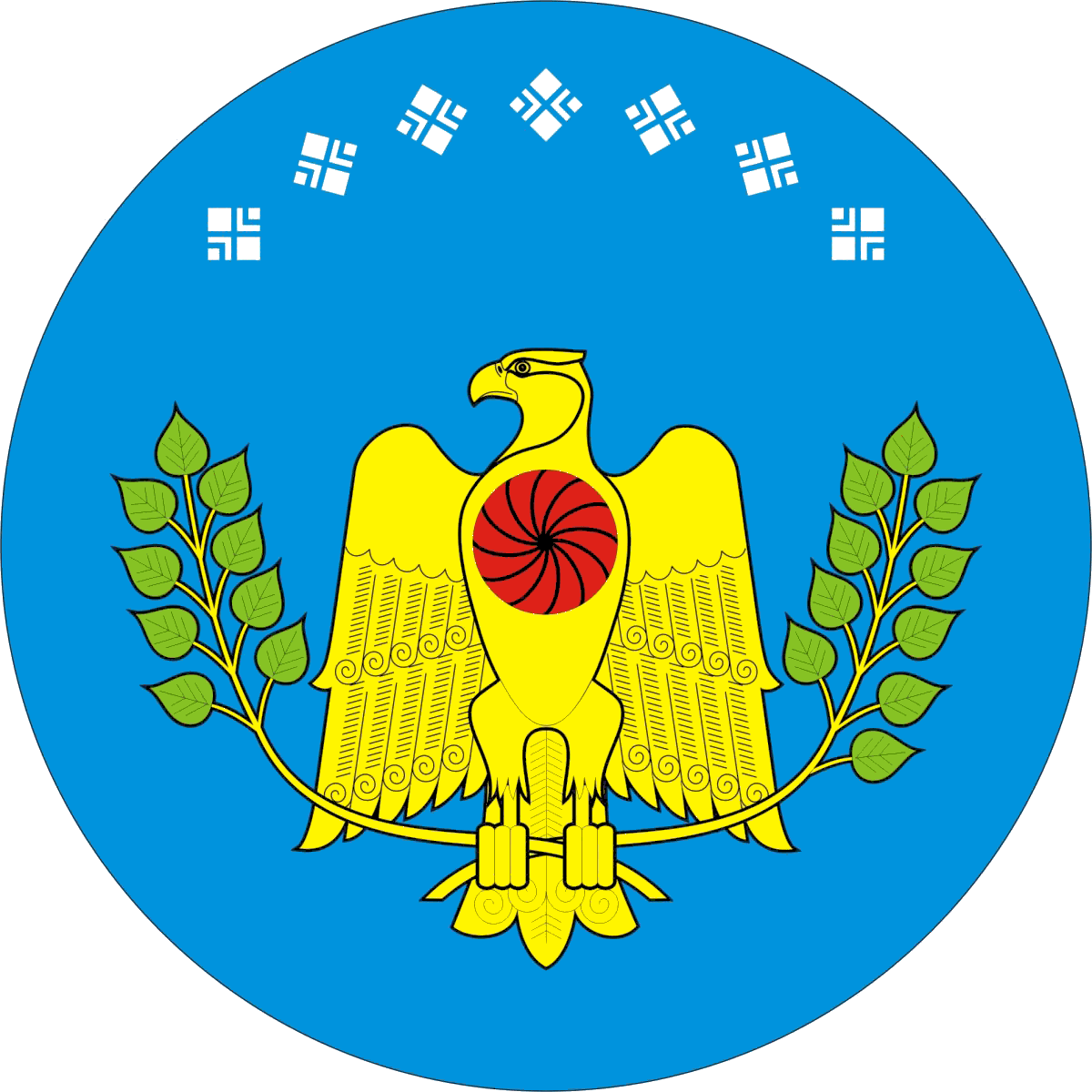
Nyurbinsky District

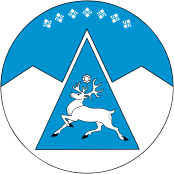
Olenyoksky District

Olyokminsky District

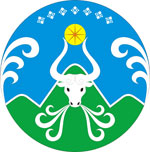
Oymyakonsky District

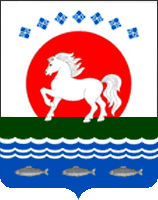
Srednekolymsky District

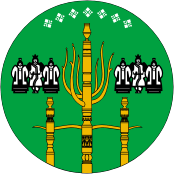
Suntarsky District

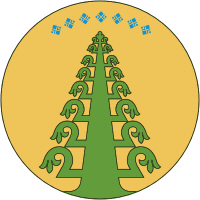
Tattinsky District

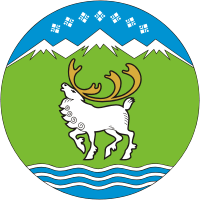
Tomponsky District

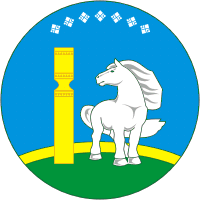
Ust-Aldansky District

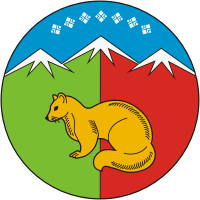
Ust-Maysky District

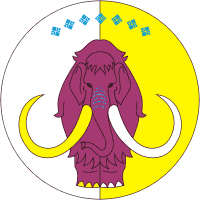
Ust-Yansky District

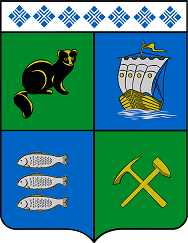
Verkhnekolymsky District

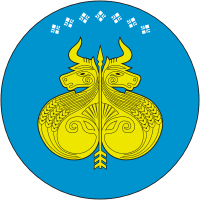
Verkhnevilyuysky District

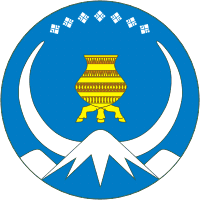
Verkhoyansky District

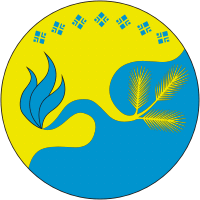
Vilyuysky District

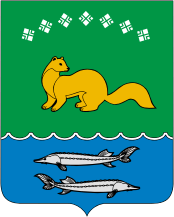
Zhigansky District

== Tatarstan ==
Kazan

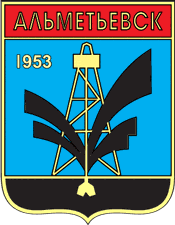
Almetyevsk

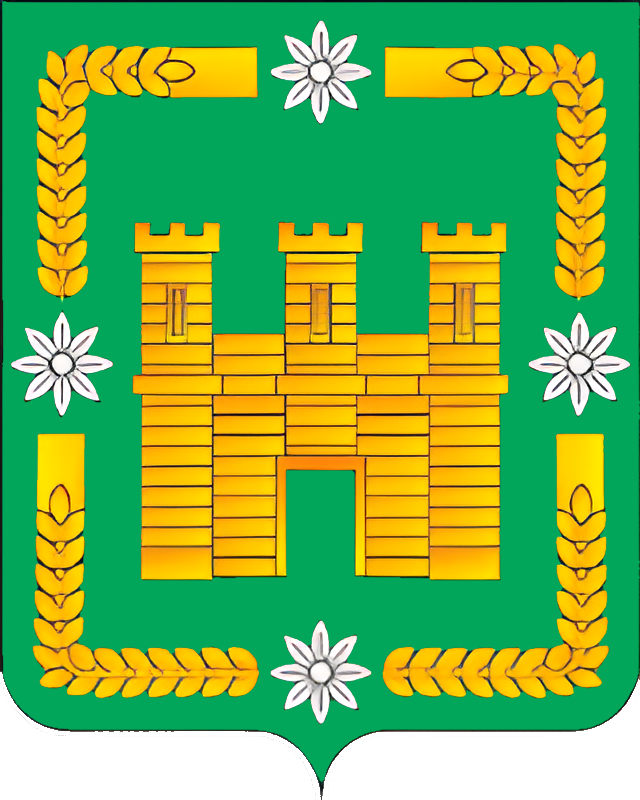
Arsk

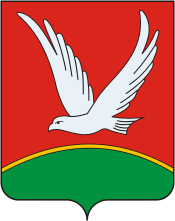
Aznakayevo

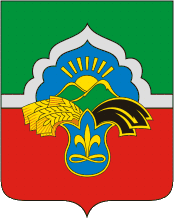
Bavly

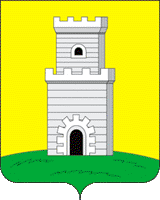
Bolgar

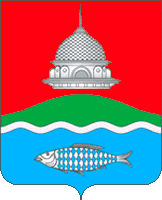
Bugulma

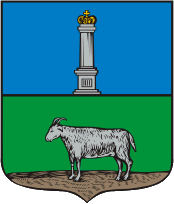
Buinsk

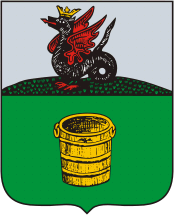
Chistopol

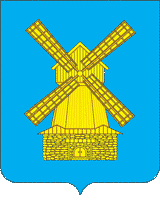
Kamskiye Polyany

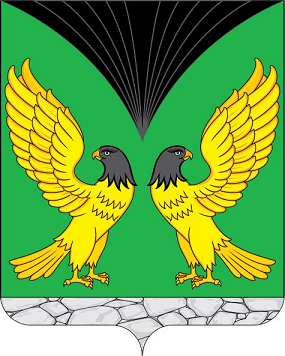
Karabash

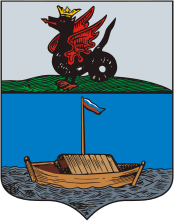
Laishevo

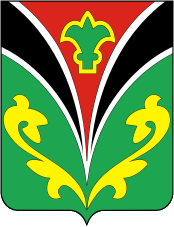
Leninogorsk

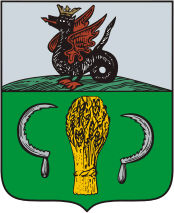
Mamadysh

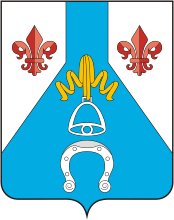
Mendeleyevsk

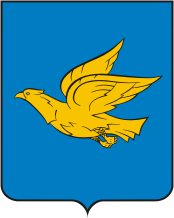
Menzelinsk

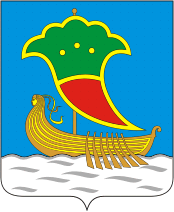
Naberezhnye Chelny

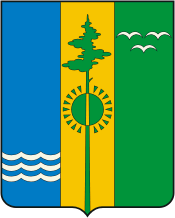
Nizhnekamsk

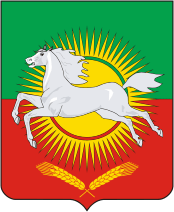
Nurlat

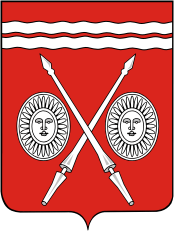
Tetyushi

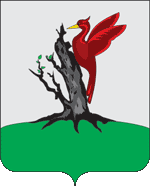
Yelabuga

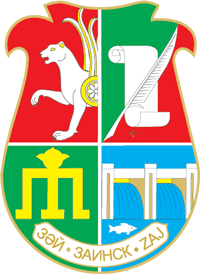
Zainsk

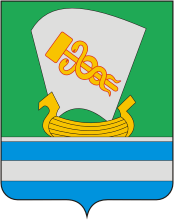
Zelenodolsk

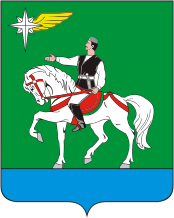
Agryzsky District

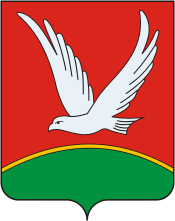
Aznakayevsky District

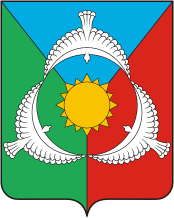
Aksubayevsky District

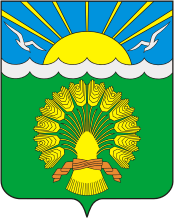
Aktanyshsky District

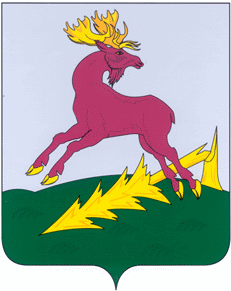
Alexeyevsky District

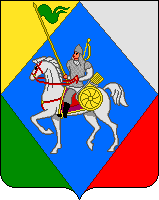
Alkeyevsky District

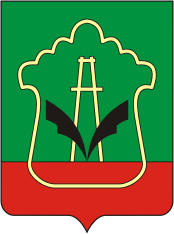
Almetyevsky District

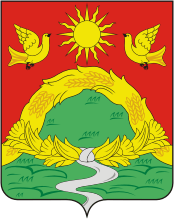
Apastovsky District

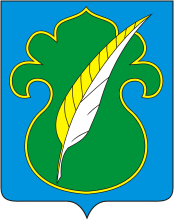
Atninsky District

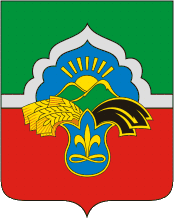
Bavlinsky District

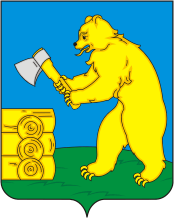
Baltasinsky District

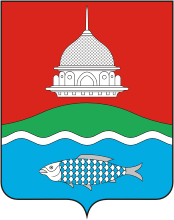
Bugulminsky District

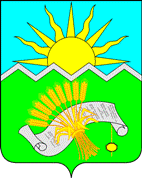
Buinsky District

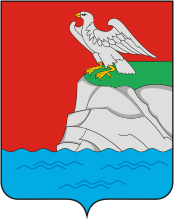
Verkhneuslonsky District

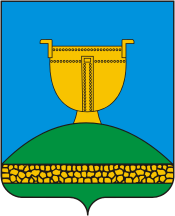
Vysokogorsky District

Drozhzhanovsky District

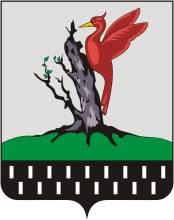
Yelabuzhsky District

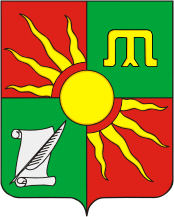
Zainsky District

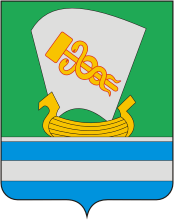
Zelenodolsky District

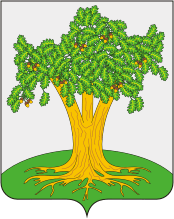
Kaybitsky District

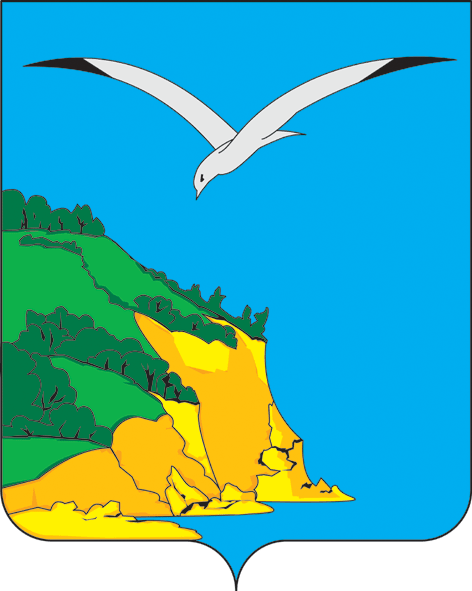
Kamsko-Ustyinsky District

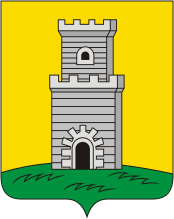
Spassky District

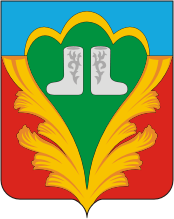
Kukmorsky District

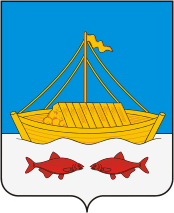
Laishevsky District

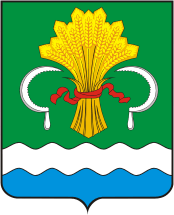
Mamadyshsky District

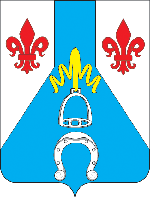
Mendeleyevsky District

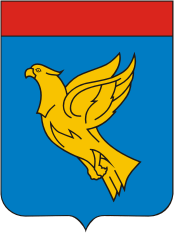
Menzelinsky District

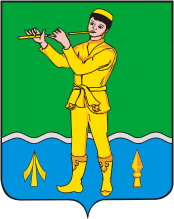
Muslyumovsky District

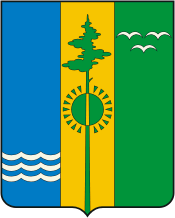
Nizhnekamsky District

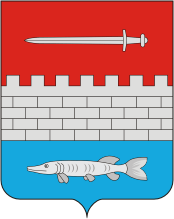
Novosheshminsky District

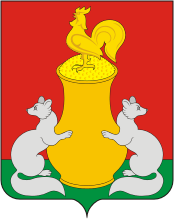
Pestrechinsky District

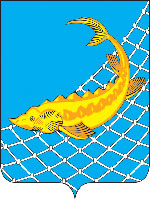
Rybno-Slobodsky District

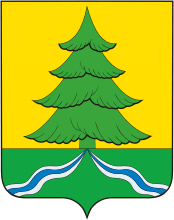
Sabinsky District

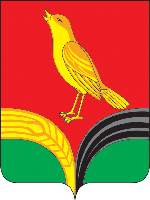
Sarmanovsky District

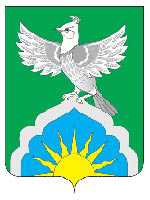
Yutazinsky District

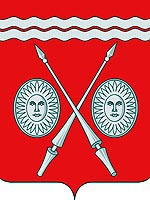
Tetyushsky District

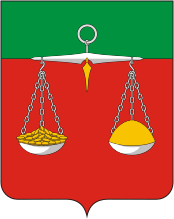
Tyulyachinsky District

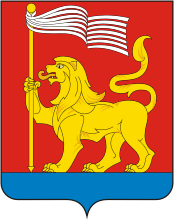
Tukayevsky District

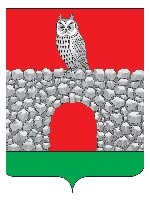
Cheremshansky District

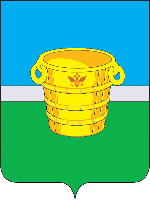
Chistopolsky District

== Tuva ==
Kyzyl

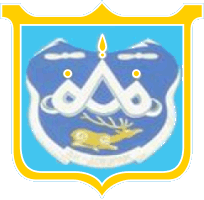
Ak-Dovurak

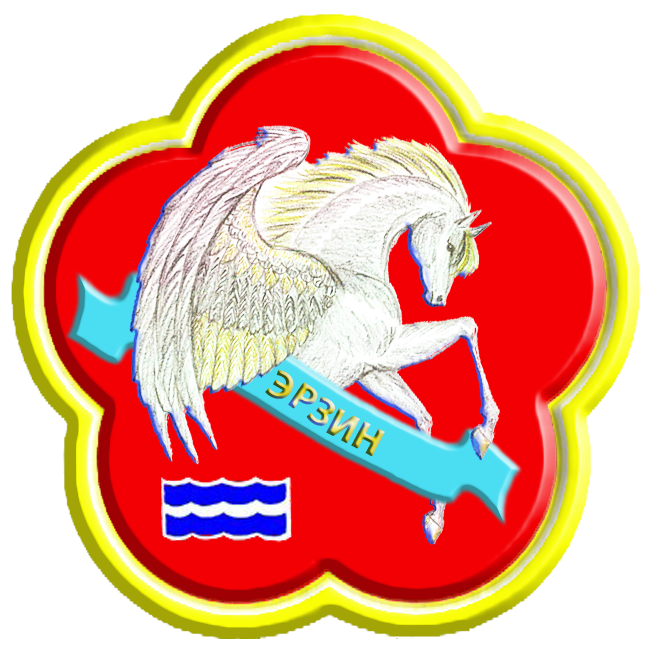
Erzinsky District

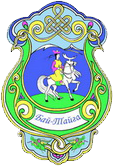
Bay-Tayginsky District

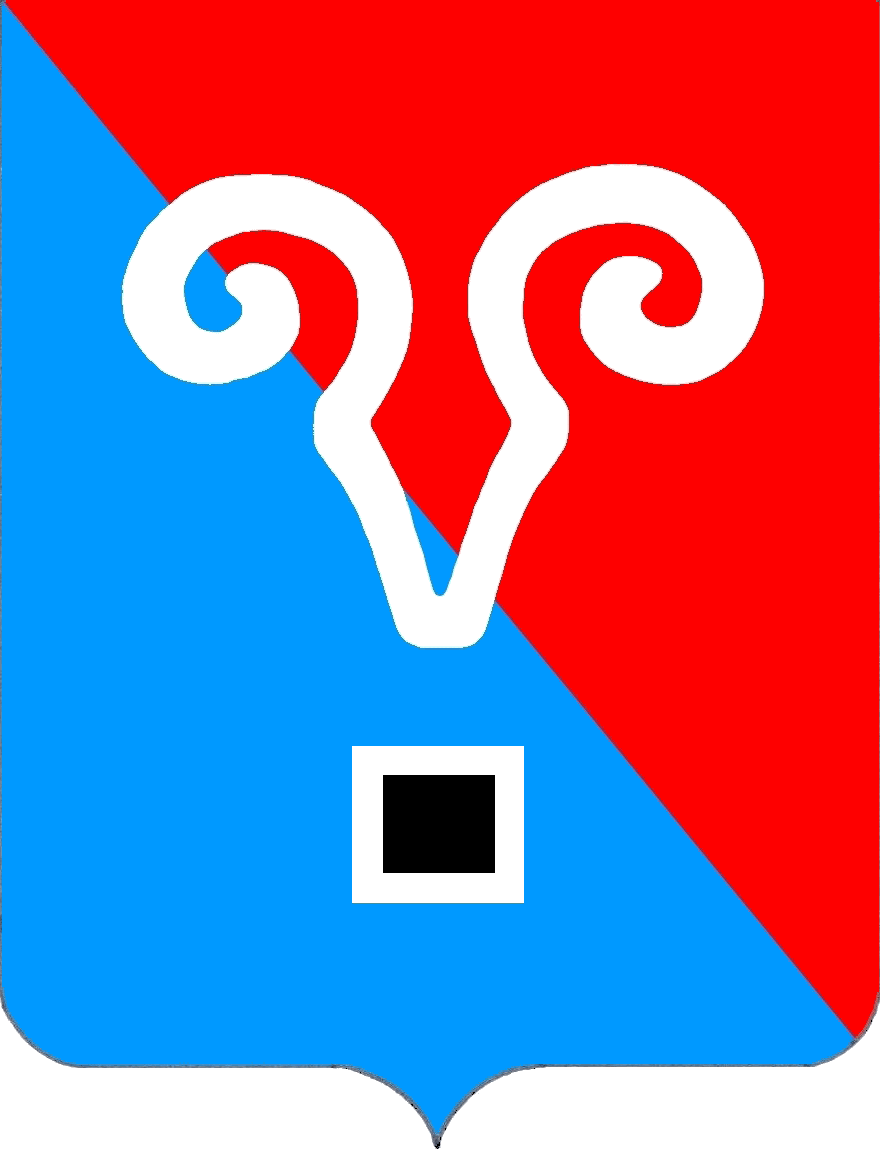
Kyzylsky District

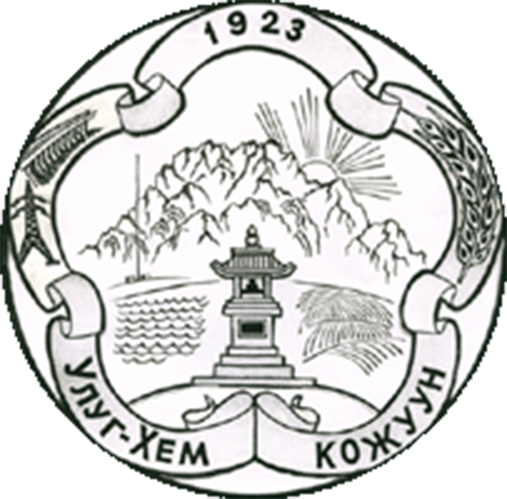
Ulug-Khemsky District

== Udmurtia ==
Izhevsk

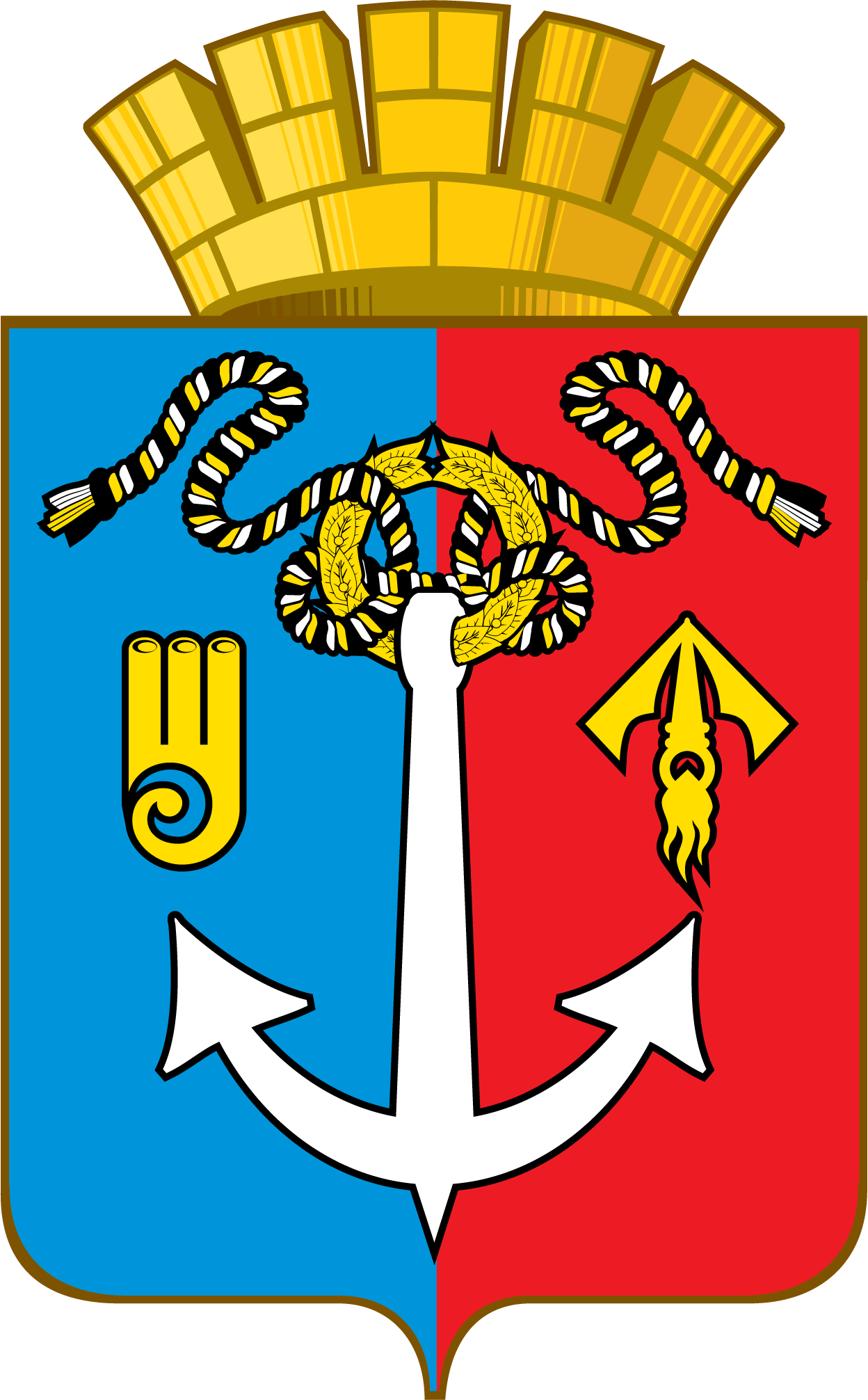
Votkinsk

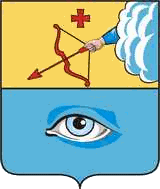
Glazov

Kambarka

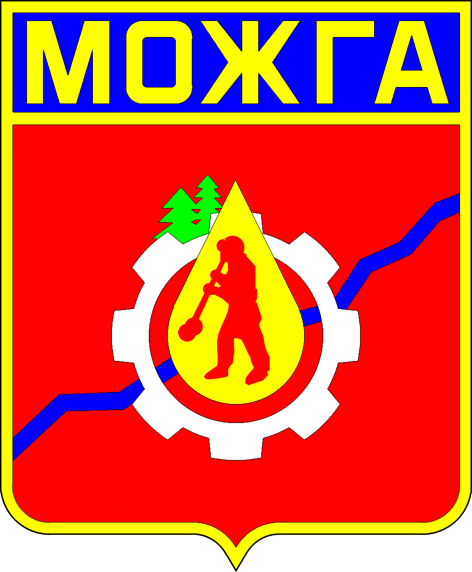
Mozhga

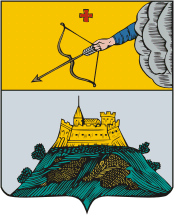
Sarapul

Alnashsky District

Balezinsky District

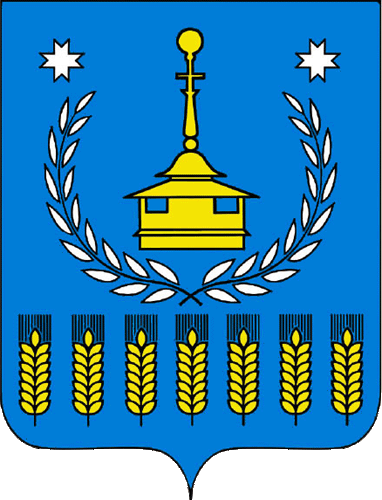
Votkinsky District

Glazovsky District

Grakhovsky District

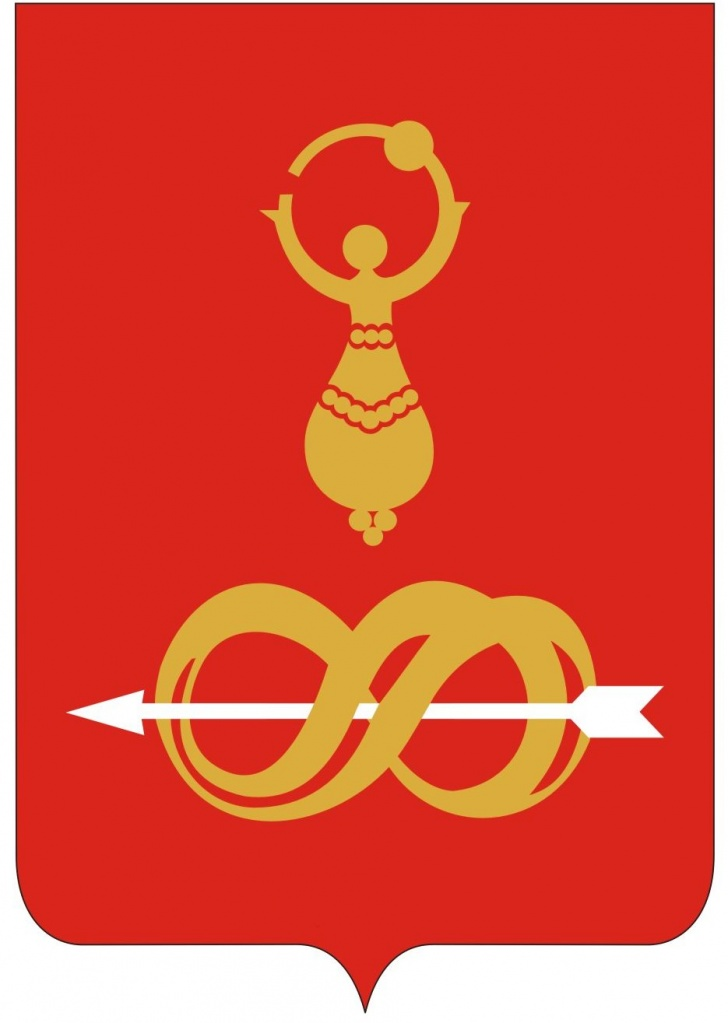
Debyossky District

Zavyalovsky District

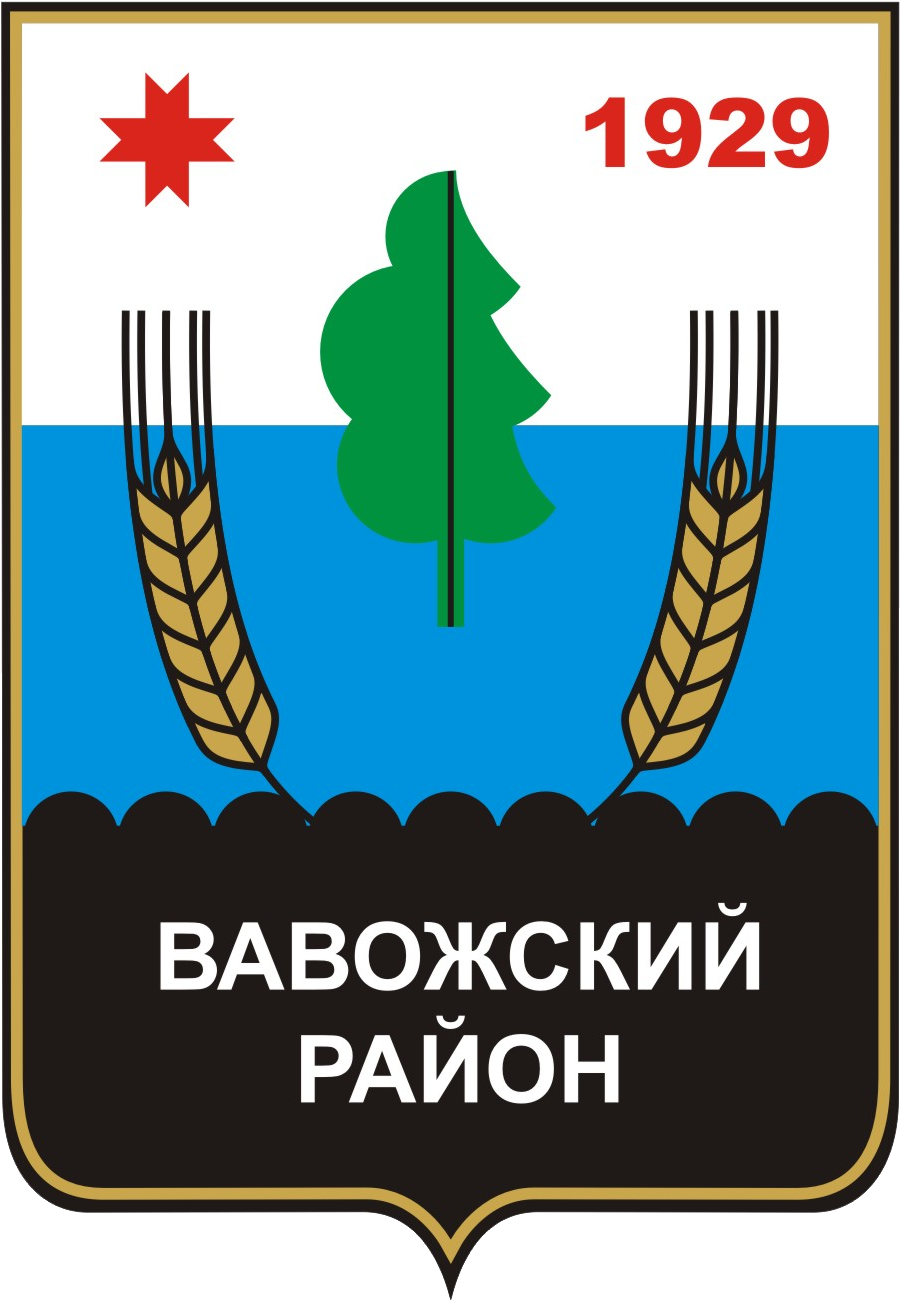
Vavozhsky District

Igrinsky District

Kambarsky District

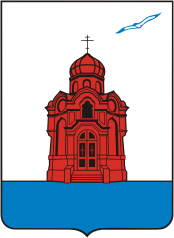
Karakulinsky District

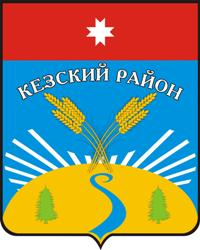
Kezsky District

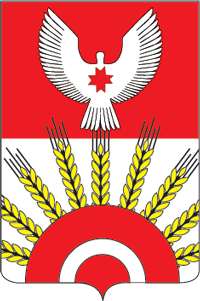
Kiyasovsky District

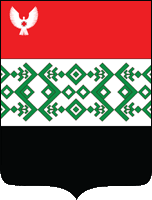
Kiznersky District

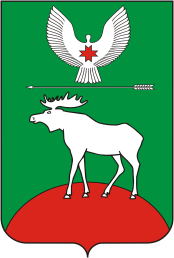
Krasnogorsky District

Malopurginsky District

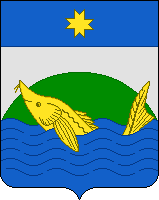
Sarapulsky District

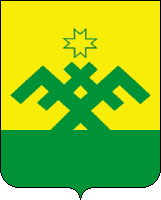
Seltinsky District

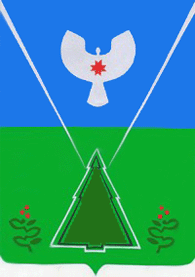
Syumsinsky District

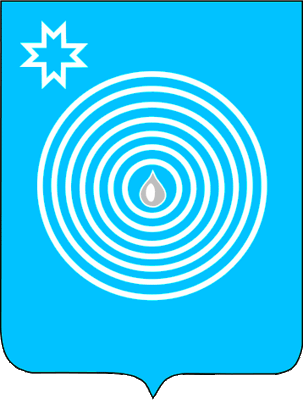
Uvinsky District

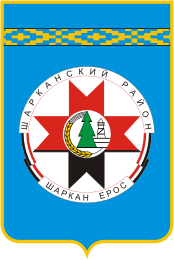
Sharkansky District

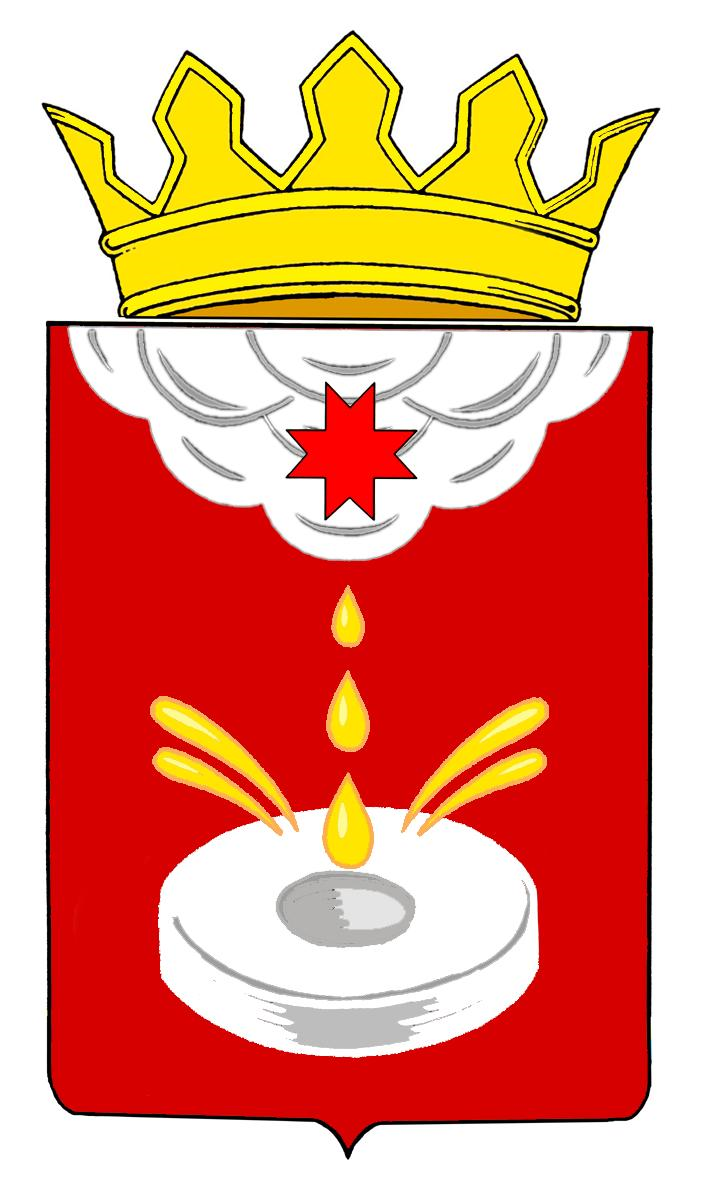
Yukamensky District

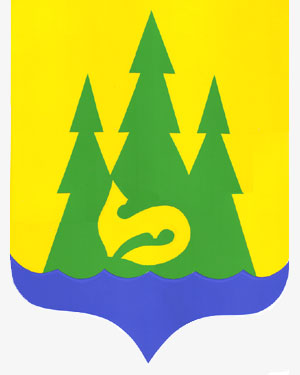
Yakshur-Bodyinsky District

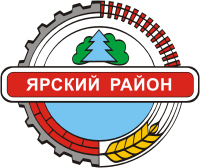
Yarsky District

== Amur Oblast ==
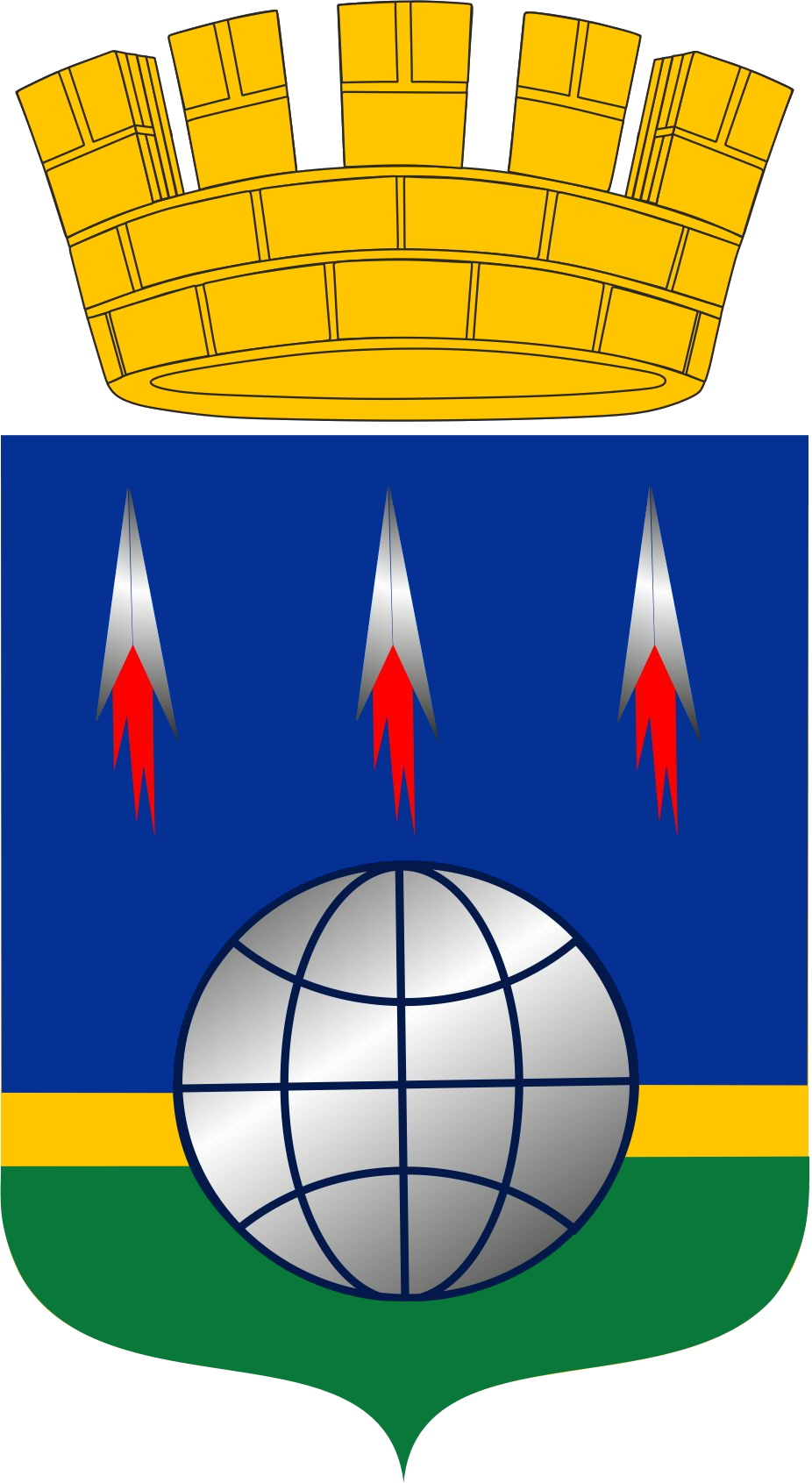
Tsiolkovsky

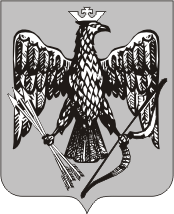
Albazino

Blagoveshchensk

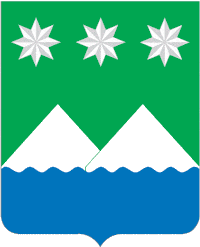
Belogorsk

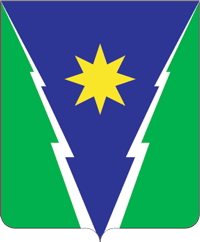
Zeya

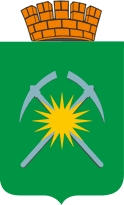
Raychikhinsk

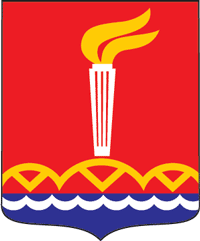
Svobodny

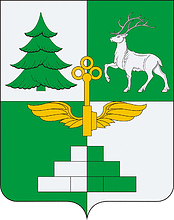
Tynda

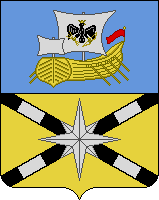
Skovorodino

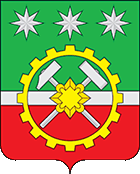
Shimanovsk

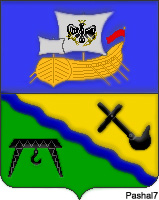
Novobureysky

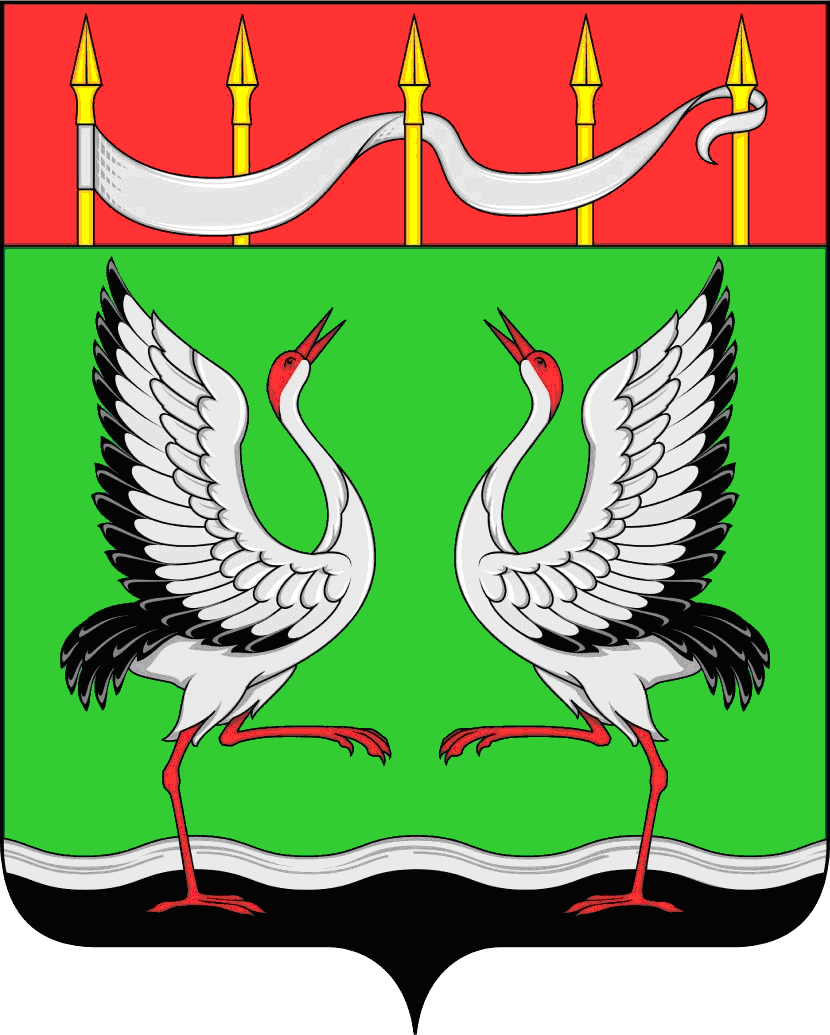
Arkharinsky District

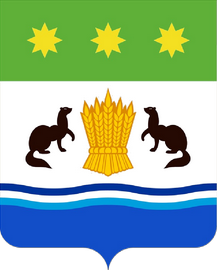
Belogorsky District

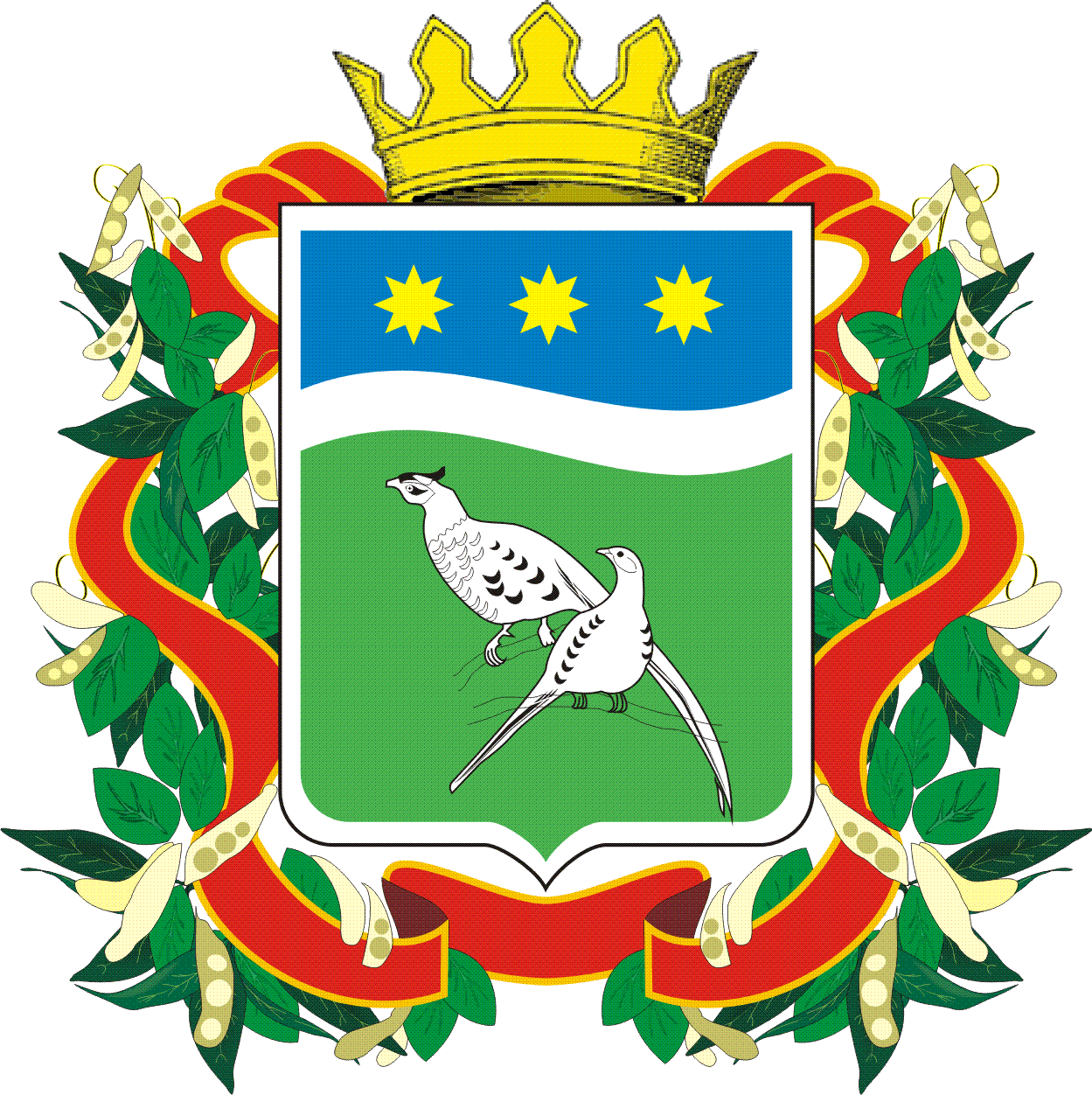
Blagoveshchensky District

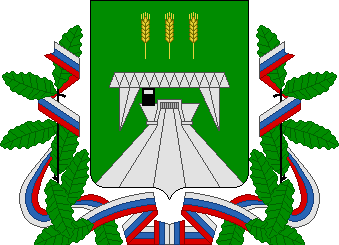
Bureysky District

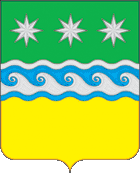
Zavitinsky District

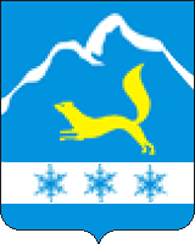
Zeysky District

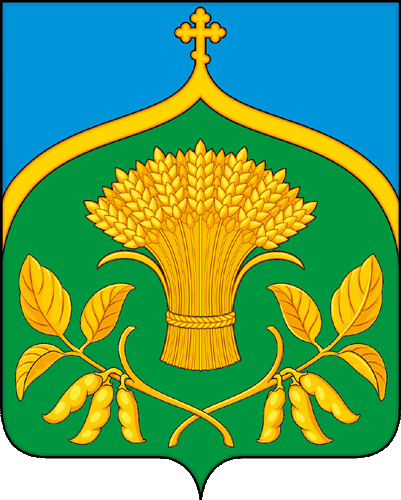
Ivanovsky District

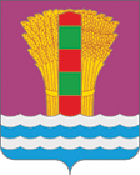
Konstantinovsky District

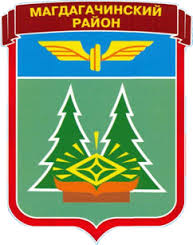
Magdagachinsky District

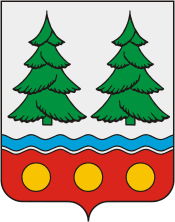
Mazanovsky District

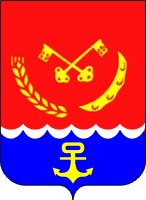
Mikhaylovsky District

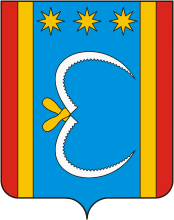
Oktyabrsky District

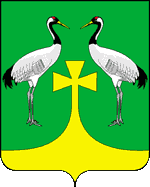
Romnensky District

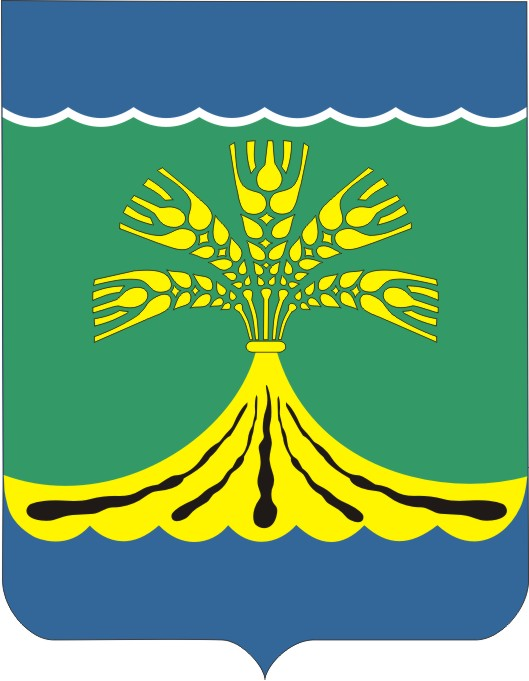
Svobodnensky District

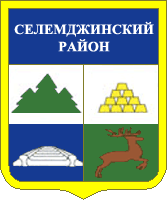
Selemdzhinsky District

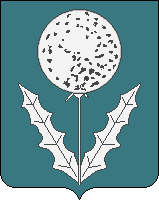
Seryshevsky District

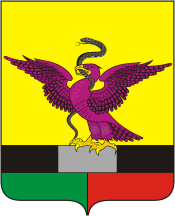
Skovorodinsky District

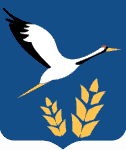
Tambovsky District

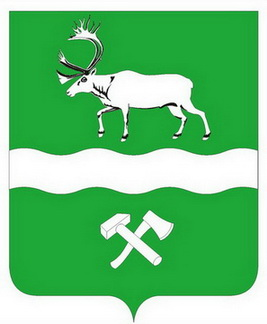
Tyndinsky District

== Arkhangelsk Oblast ==
Arkhangelsk

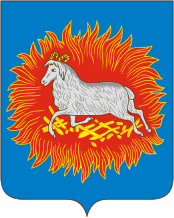
Kargopol

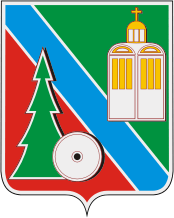
Koryazhma

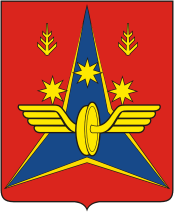
Kotlas

Mezen

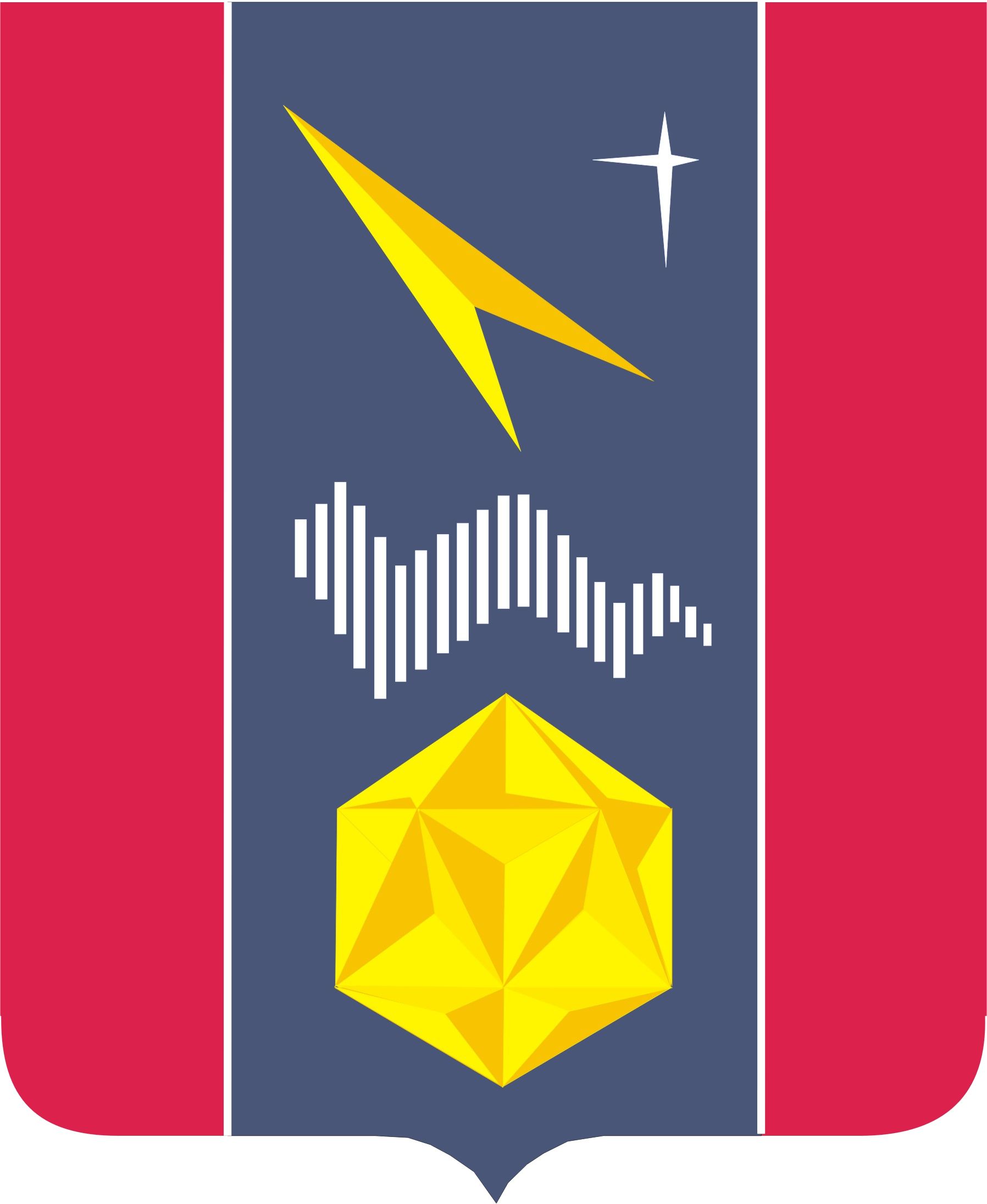
Mirny

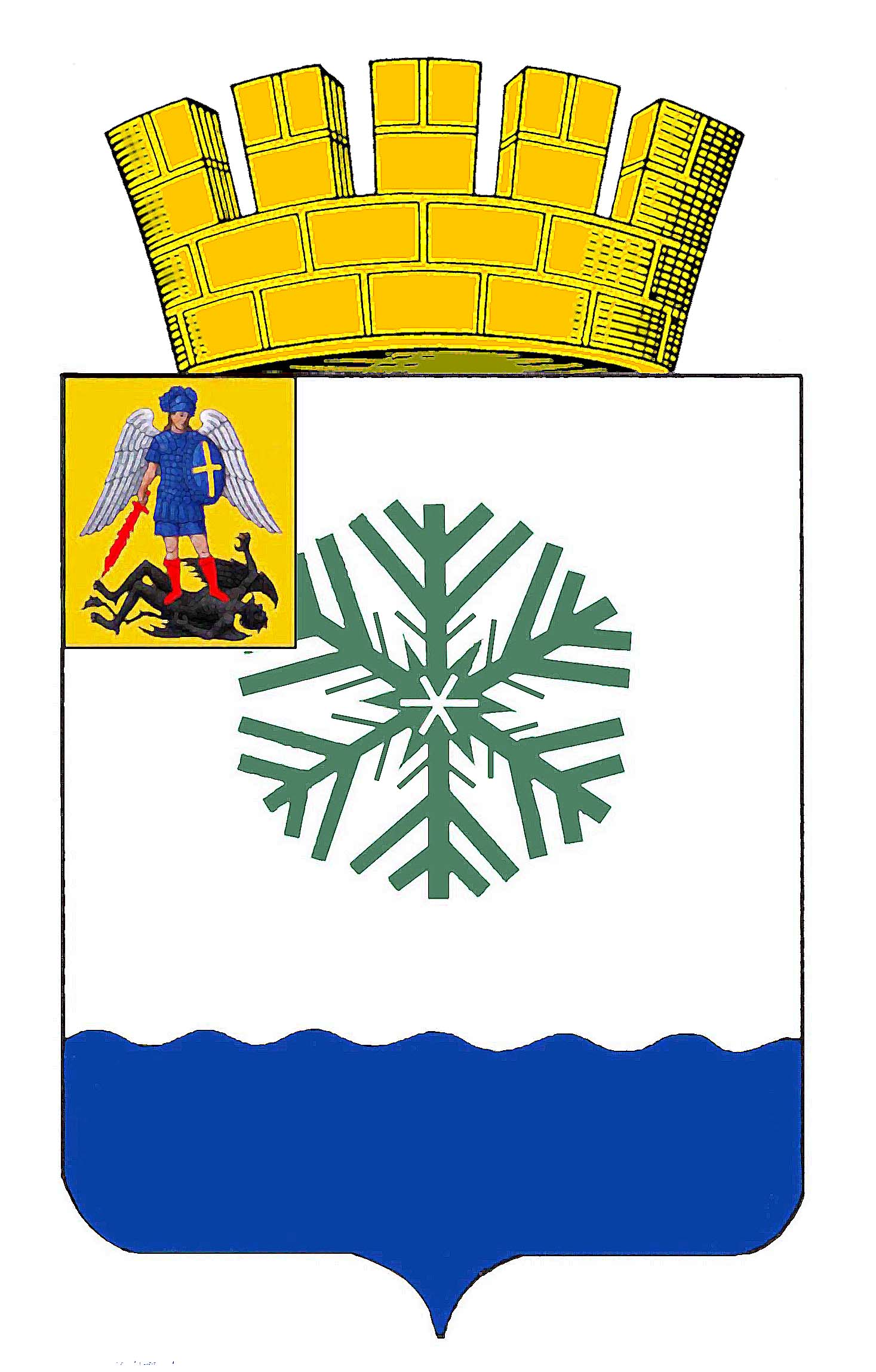
Novodvinsk

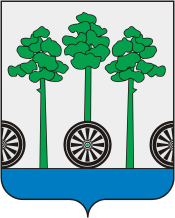
Nyandoma

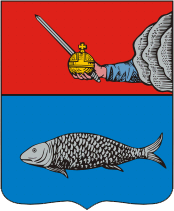
Onega

Severodvinsk

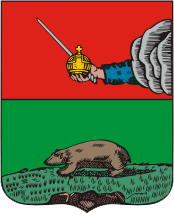
Shenkursk

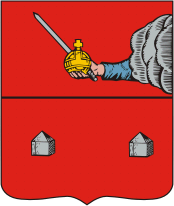
Solvychegodsk

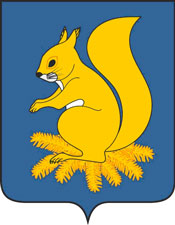
Urdoma

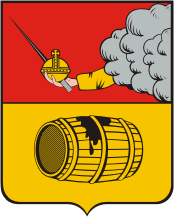
Velsk

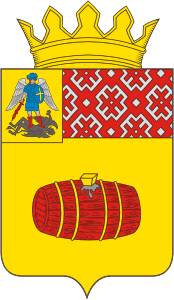
Velsky District

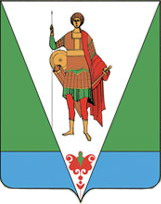
Verkhnetoyemsky District

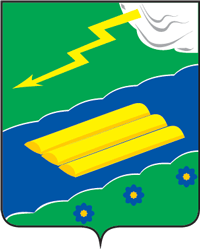
Vilegodsky District

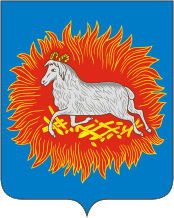
Kargopolsky District

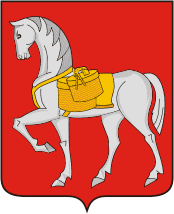
Konoshsky District

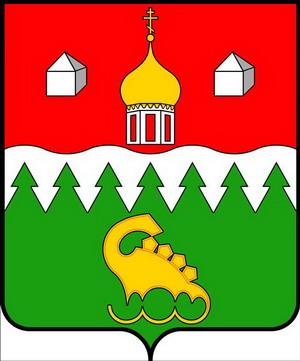
Kotlassky District

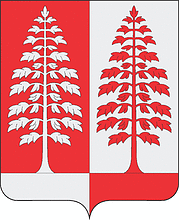
Krasnoborsky District

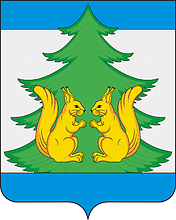
Lensky District

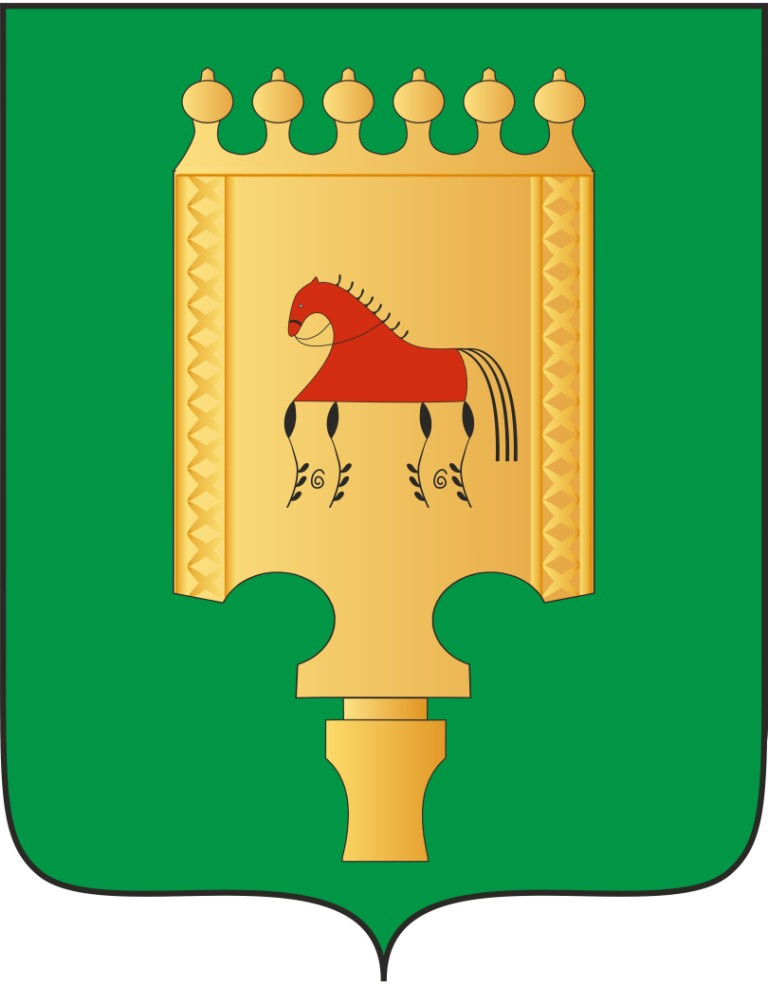
Leshukonsky District

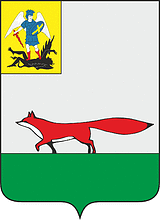
Mezensky District

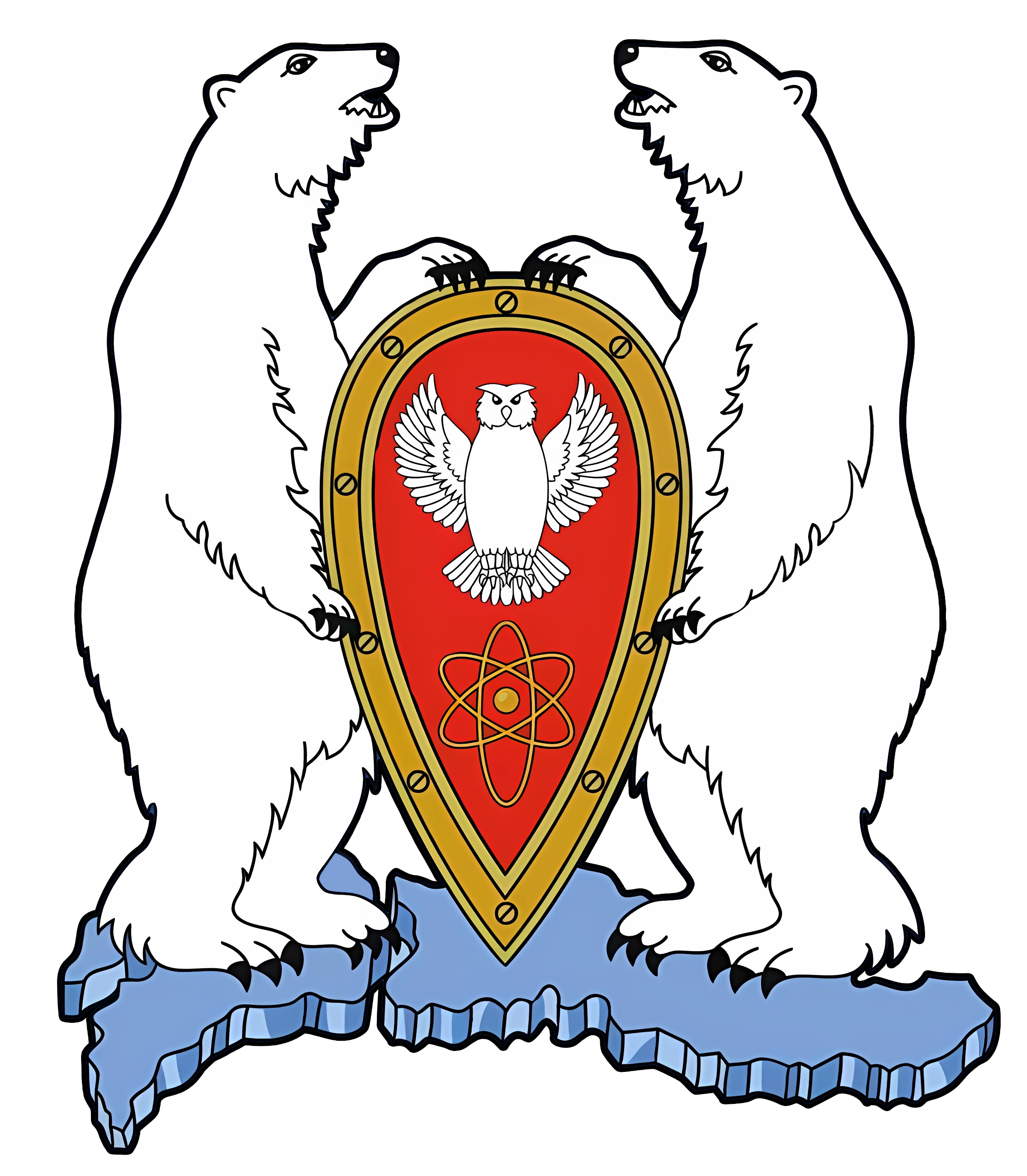
Novaya Zemlya

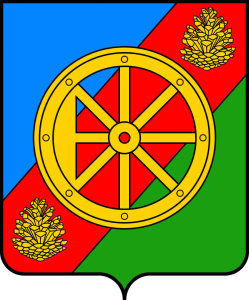
Nyandomsky District

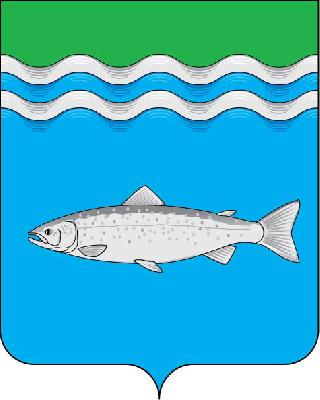
Onezhsky District

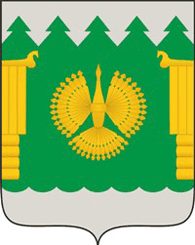
Pinezhsky District

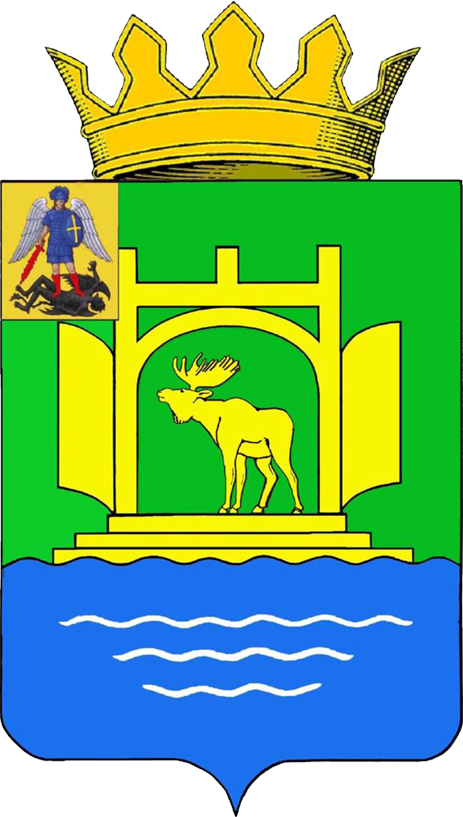
Plesetsky District

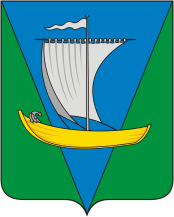
Primorsky District

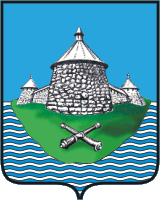
Solovetsky District

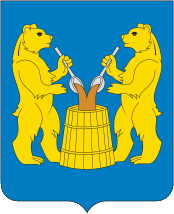
Ustyansky District

Kholmogorsky District

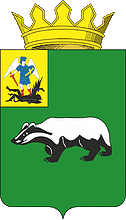
Shenkursky District

== Astrakhan Oblast ==
Astrakhan

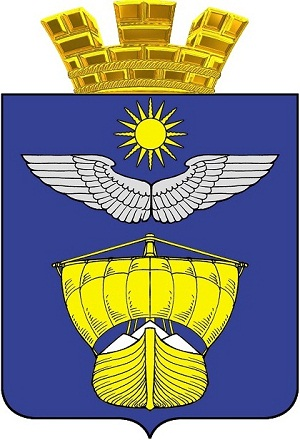
Akhtubinsk

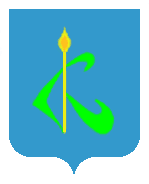
Kamyzyak

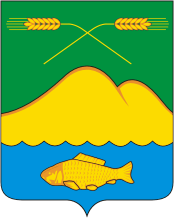
Kharabali

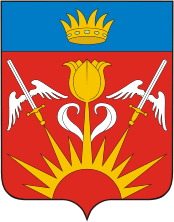
Znamensk

Akhtubinsky District

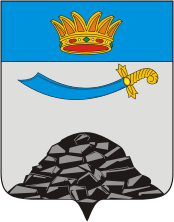
Chernoyarsky District

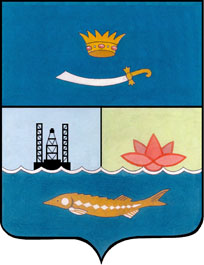
Ikryaninsky District

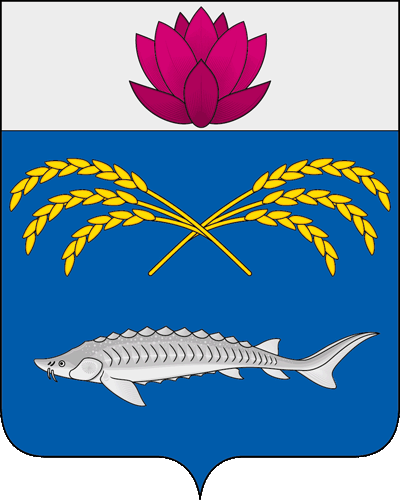
Kamyzyaksky District

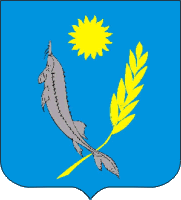
Kharabalinsky District

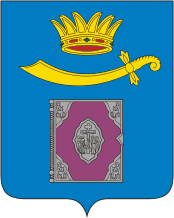
Krasnoyarsky District

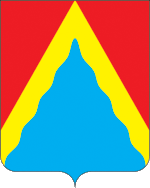
Limansky District

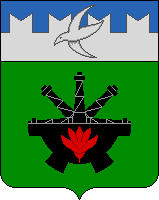
Narimanovsky District

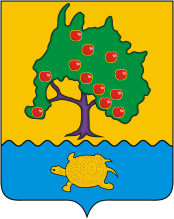
Privolzhsky District

Volodarsky District

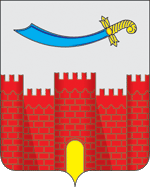
Yenotayevsky District

== Belgorod Oblast ==
Belgorod

Alexeyevka

Gubkin

Shebekino

Stary Oskol

Valuyki

Belgorodsky District

Borisovsky District

Chernyansky District

Grayvoronsky District

Ivnyansky District

Korochansky District

Krasnensky District

Krasnogvardeysky District

Krasnoyaruzhsky District

Novooskolsky District

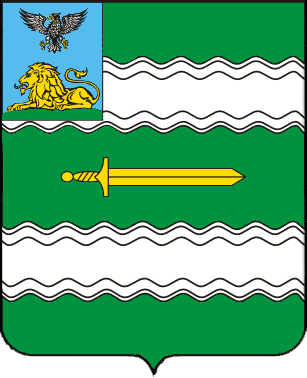
Prokhorovsky District

Rakityansky District

Rovensky District

Veydelevsky District

Volokonovsky District

Yakovlevsky District

== Bryansk Oblast ==
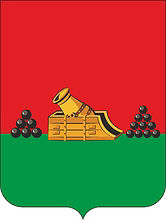
Bryansk

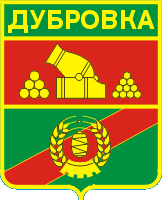
Dubrovka

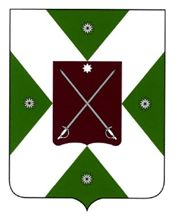
Dyatkovo

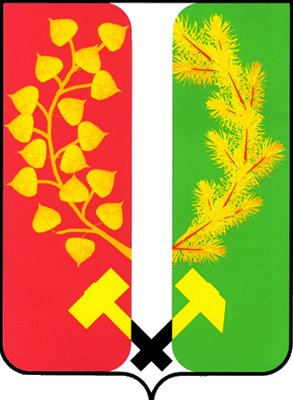
Fokino

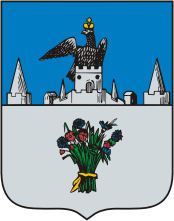
Karachev

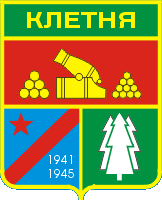
Kletnya

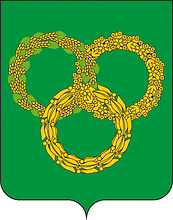
Klimovo

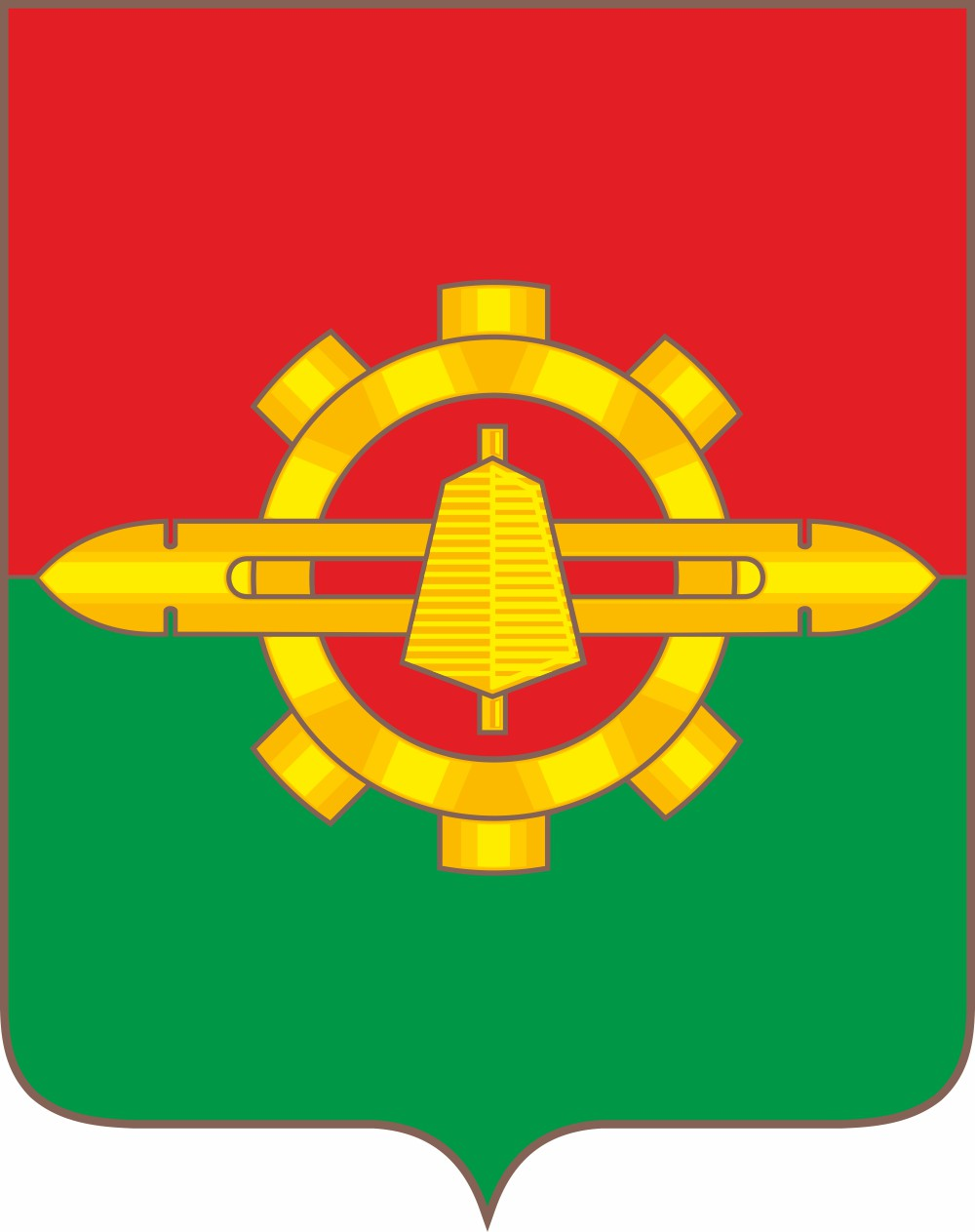
Klintsy

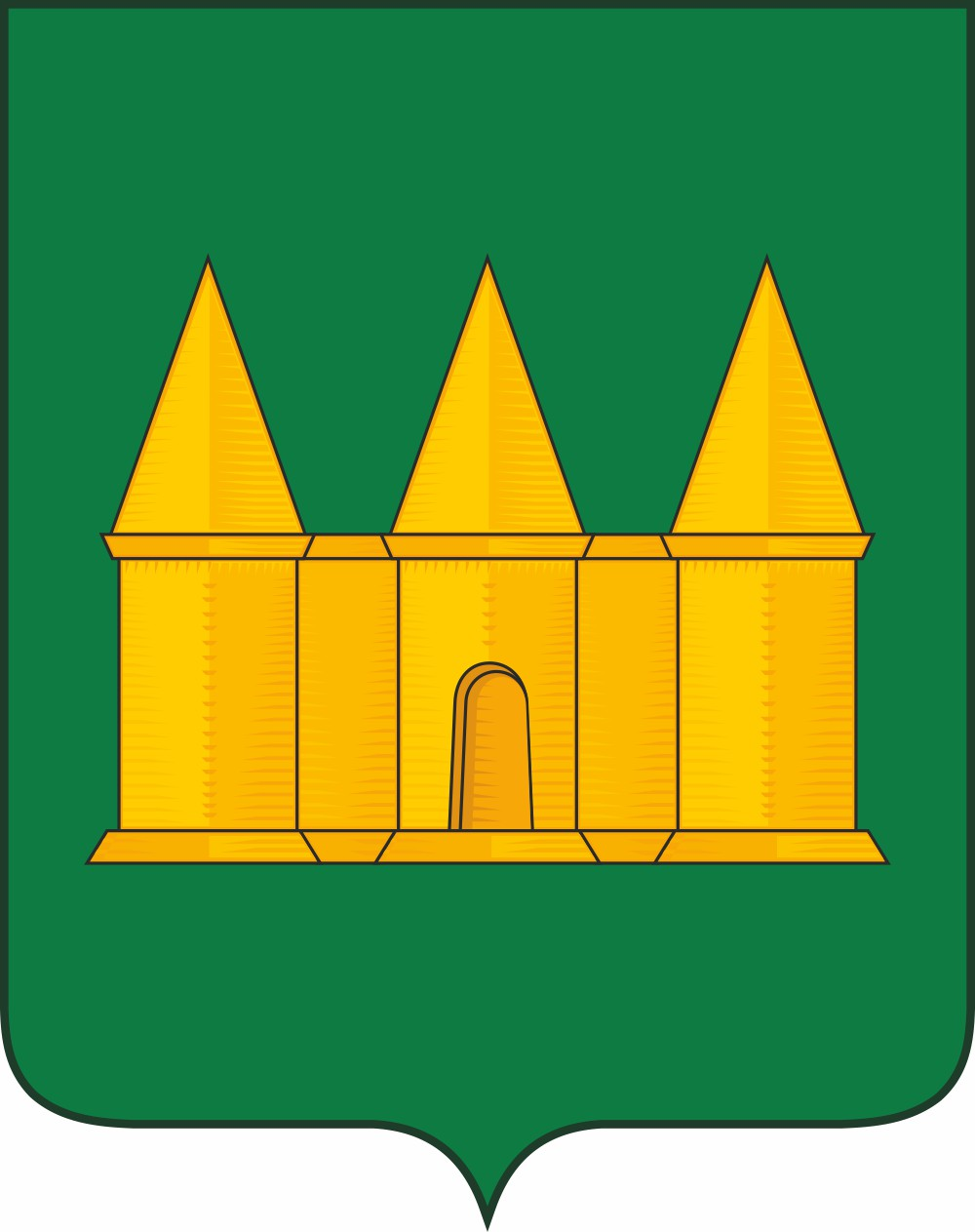
Mglin

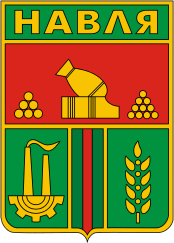
Navlya

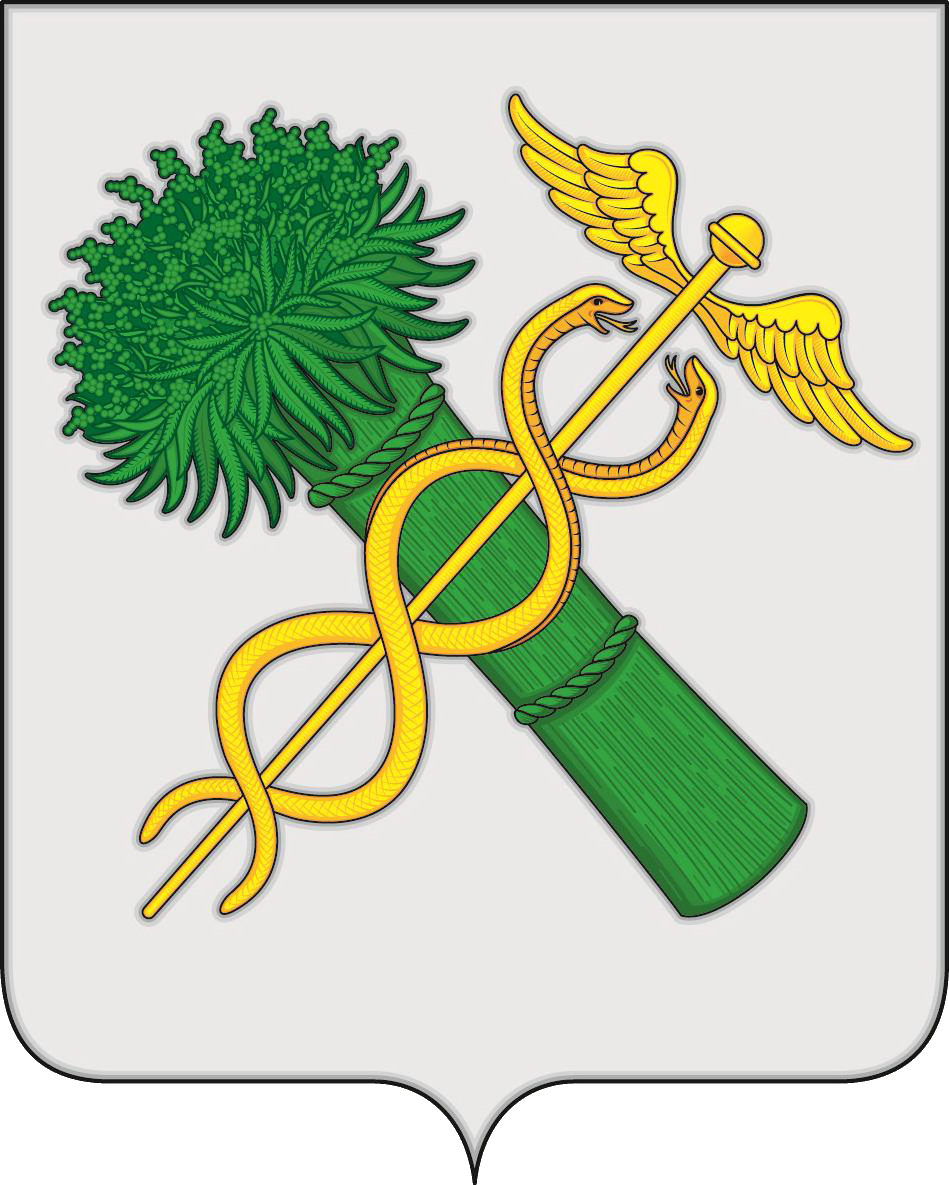
Novozybkov

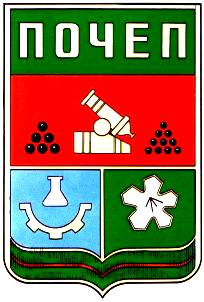
Pochep

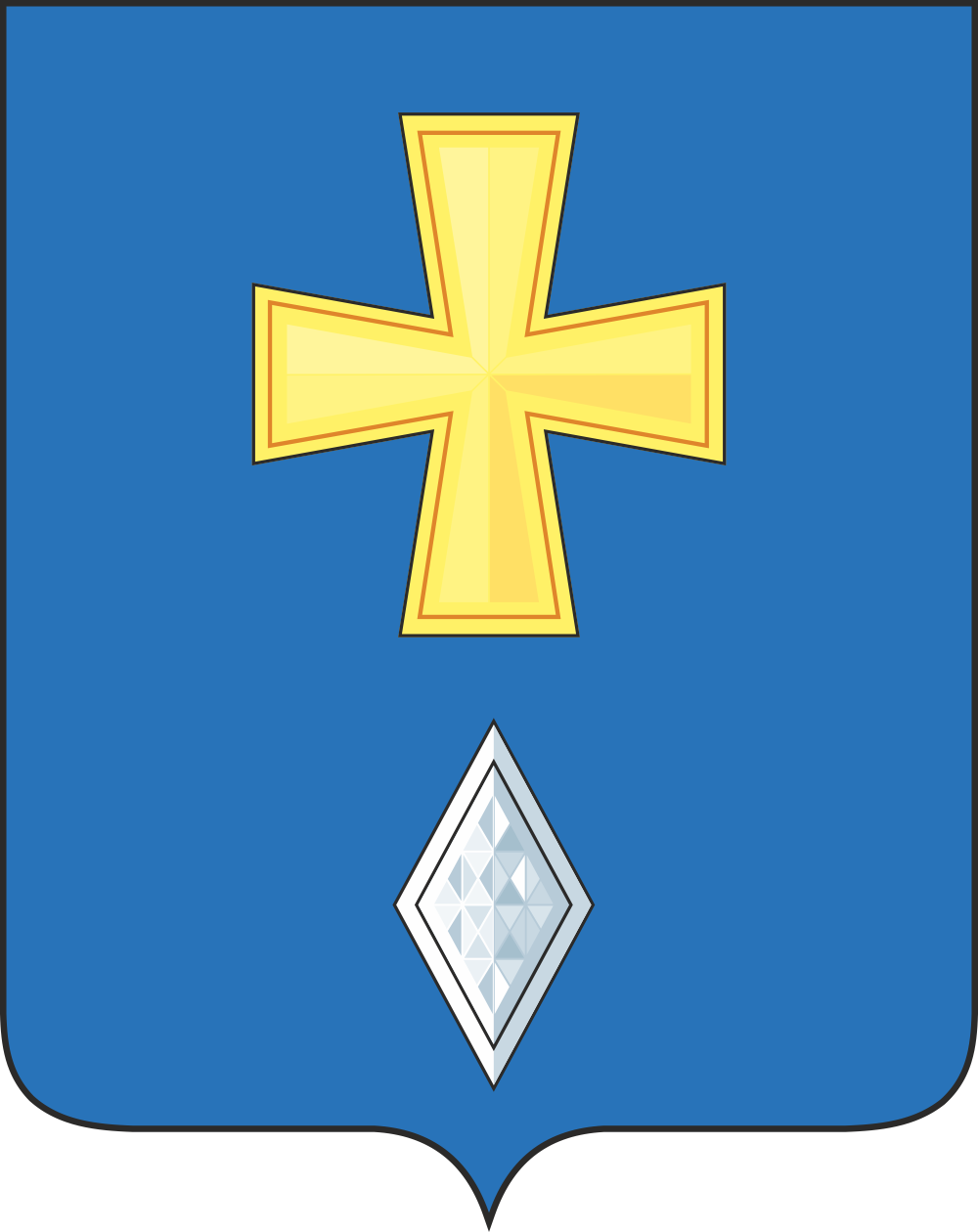
Pogar

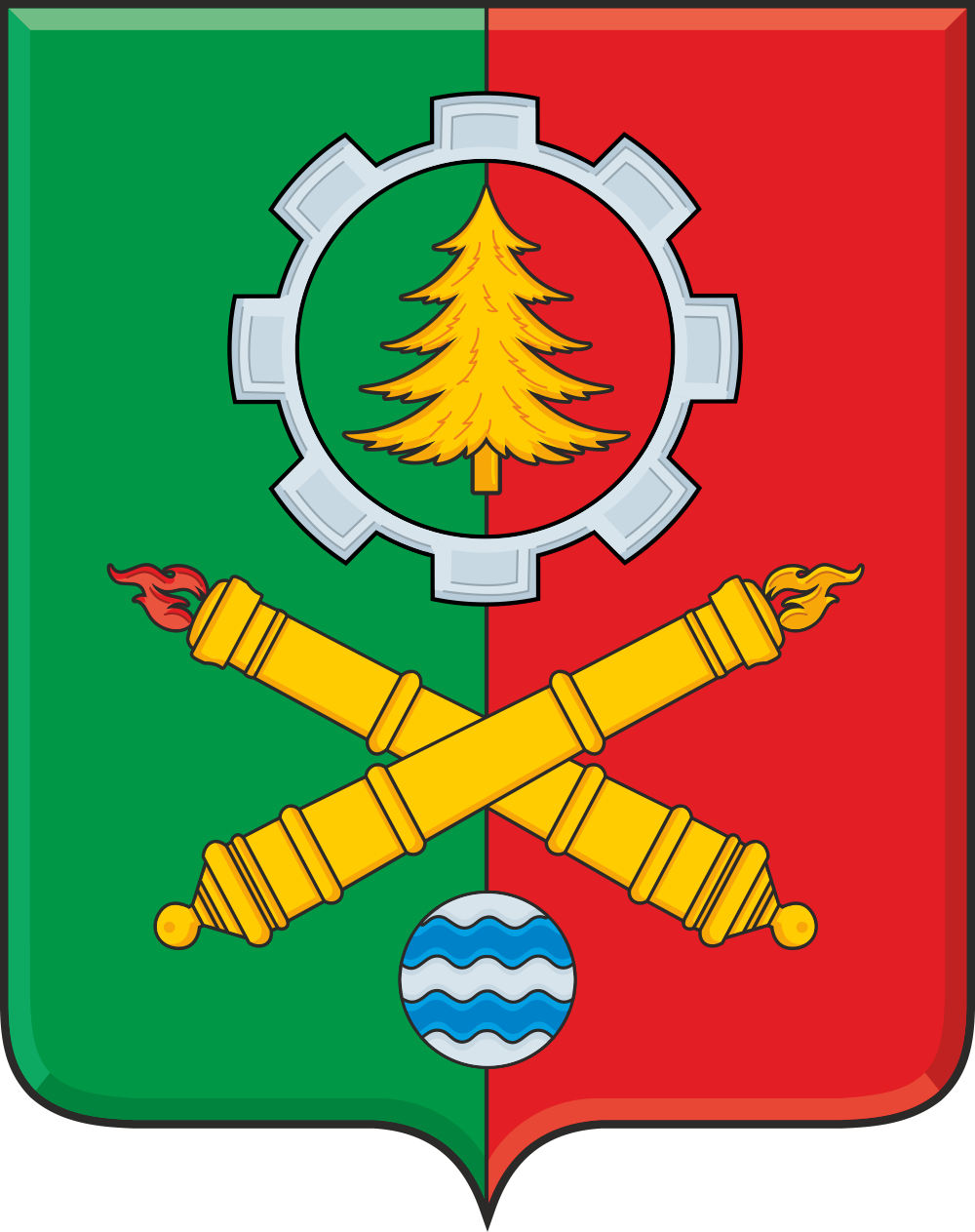
Seltso

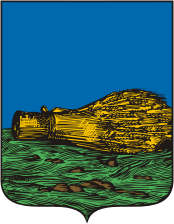
Sevsk

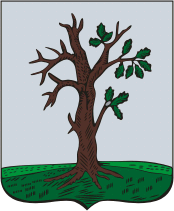
Starodub

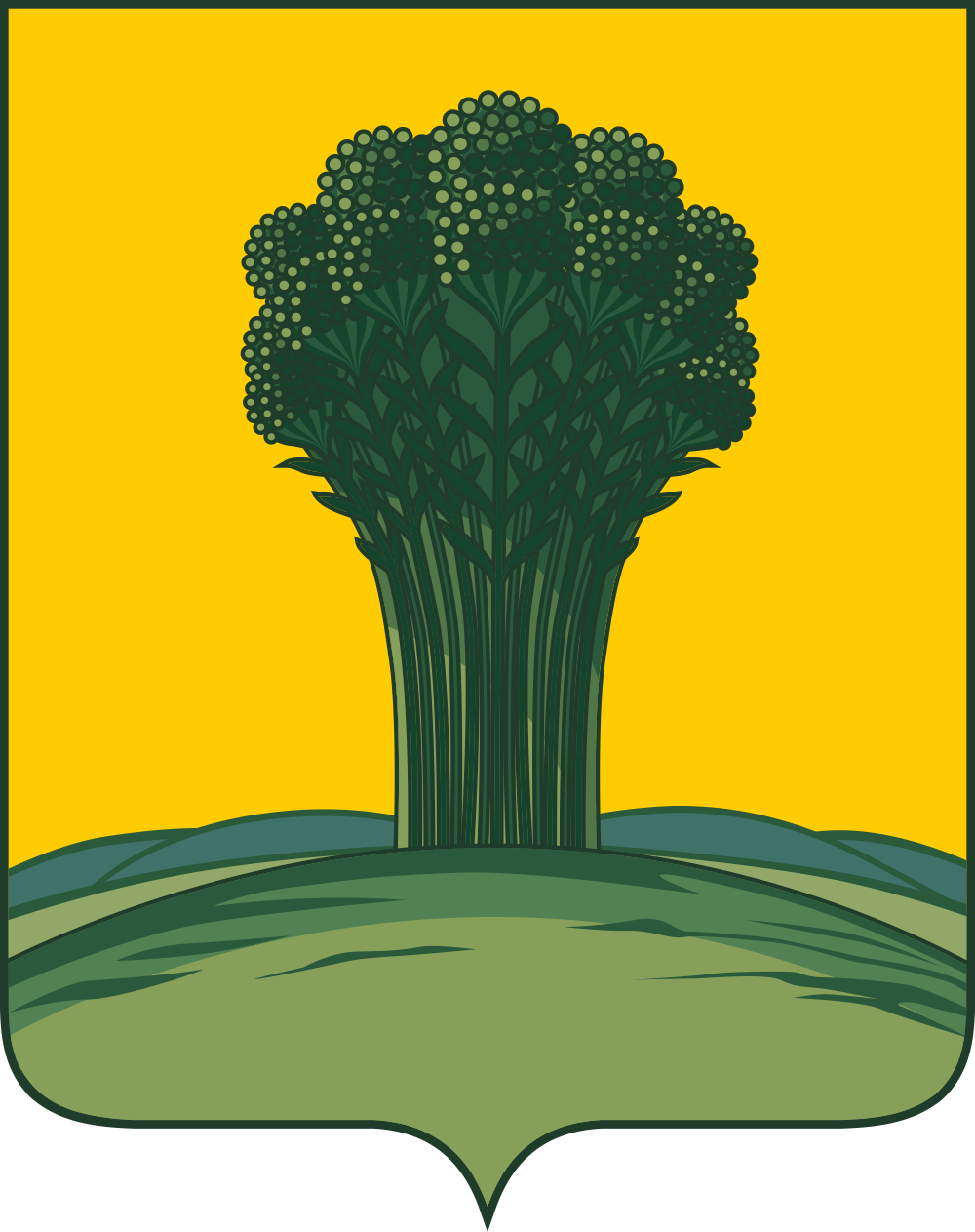
Surazh

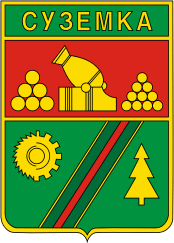
Suzemka

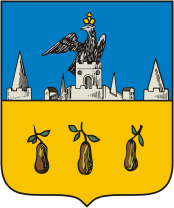
Trubchevsk

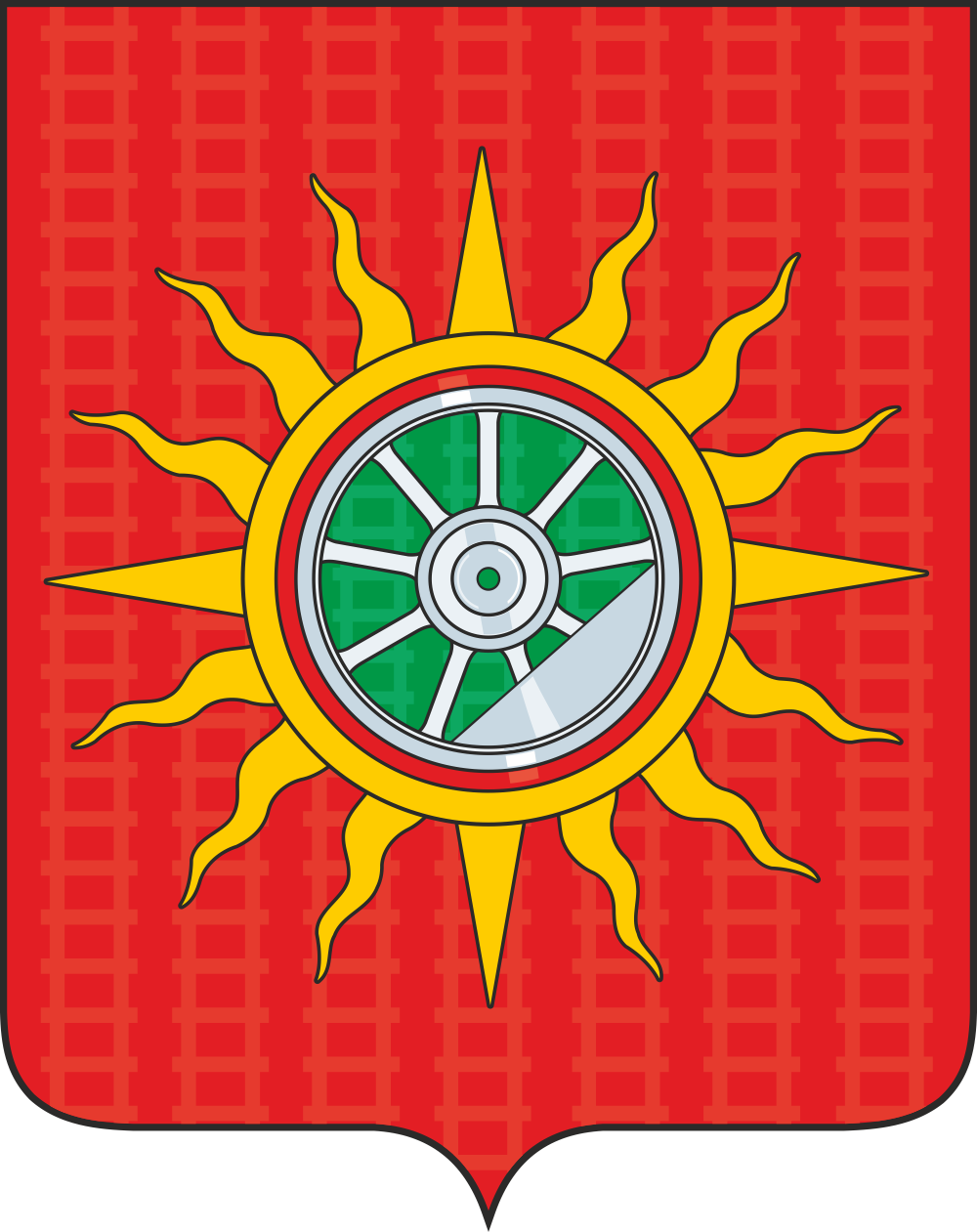
Unecha

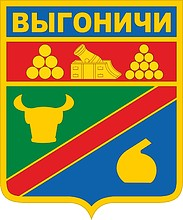
Vygonichi

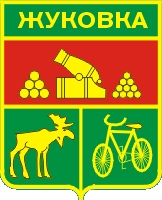
Zhukovka

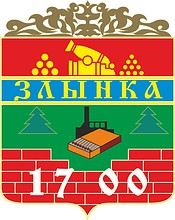
Zlynka

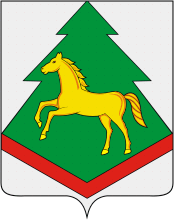
Brasovsky District

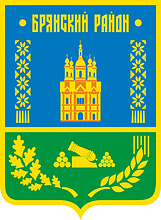
Bryansky District

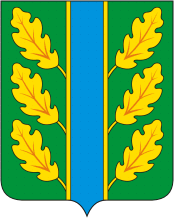
Dubrovsky District

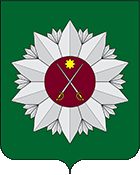
Dyatkovsky District

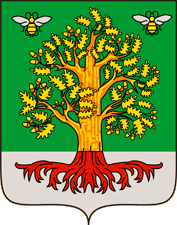
Gordeyevsky District

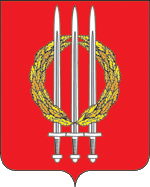
Klimovsky District

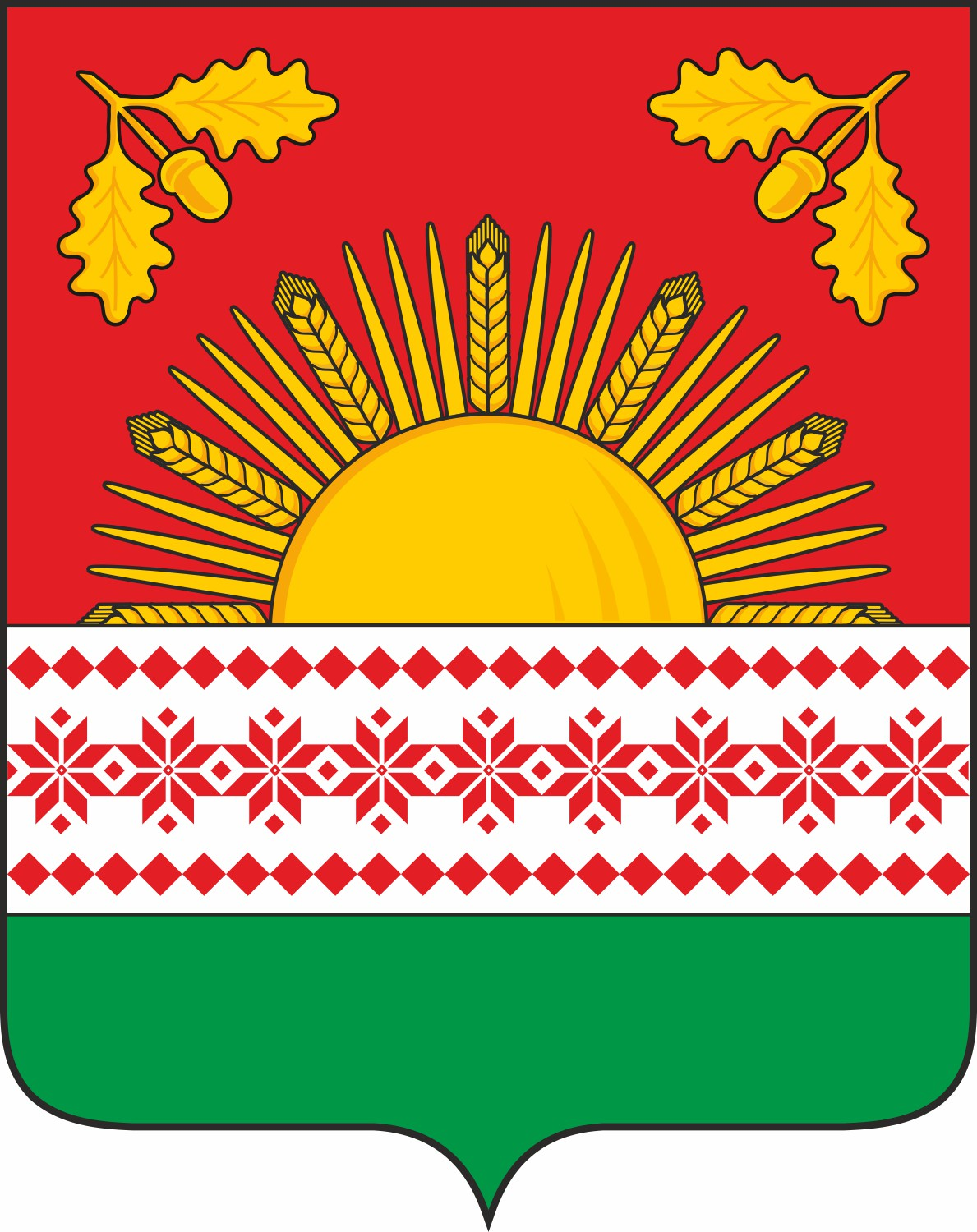
Klintsovsky District

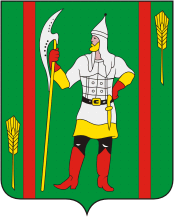
Komarichsky District

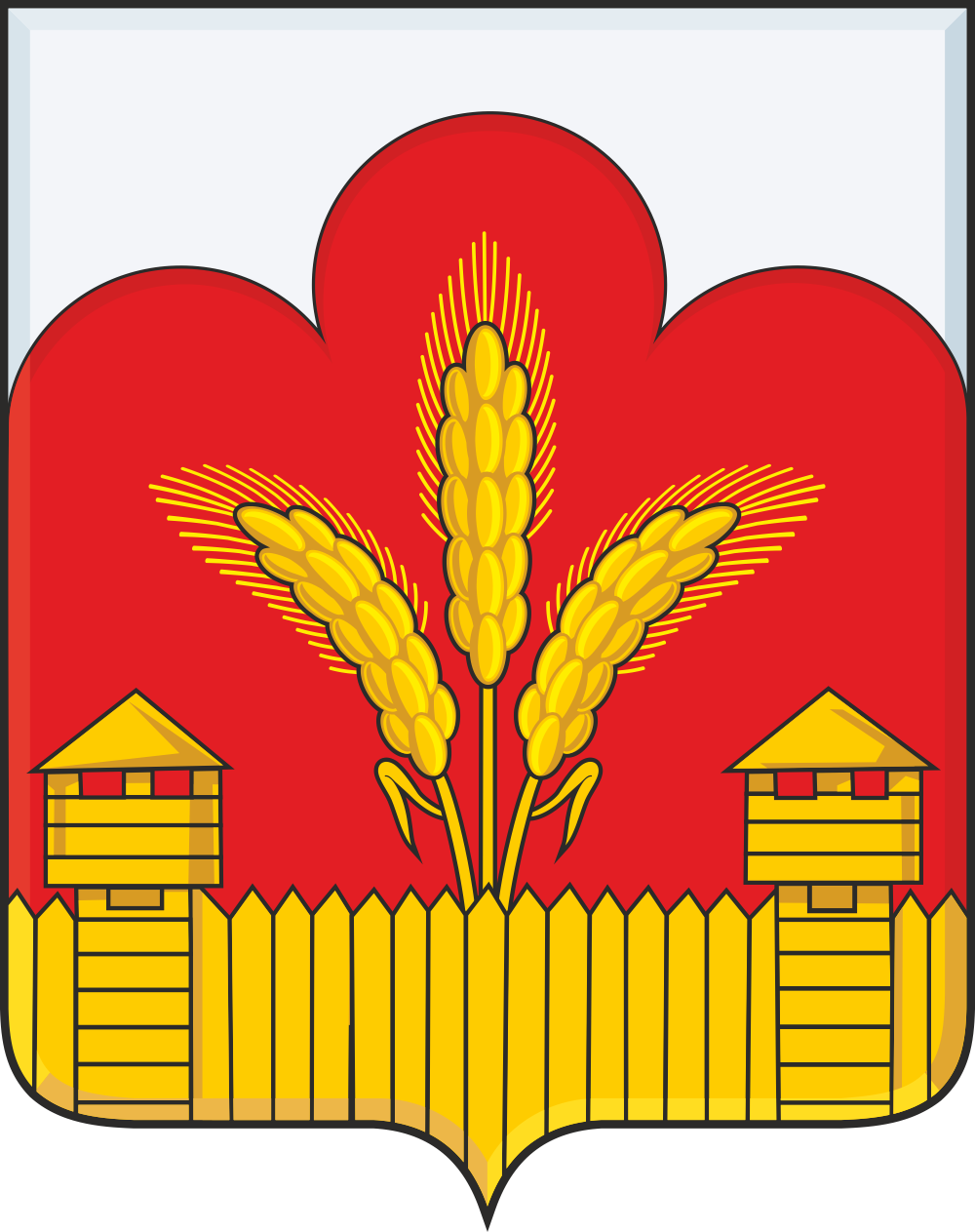
Krasnogorsky District

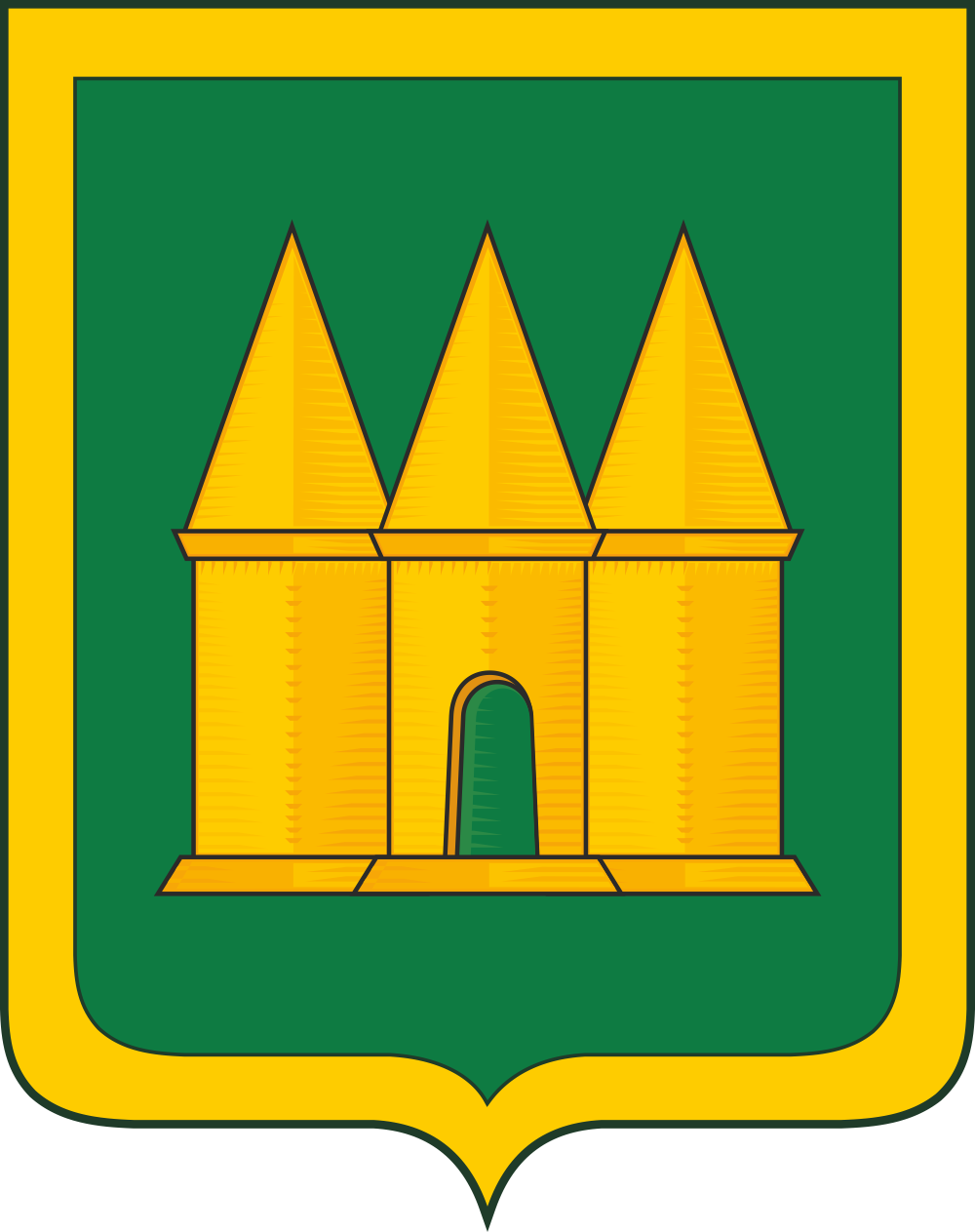
Mglinsky District

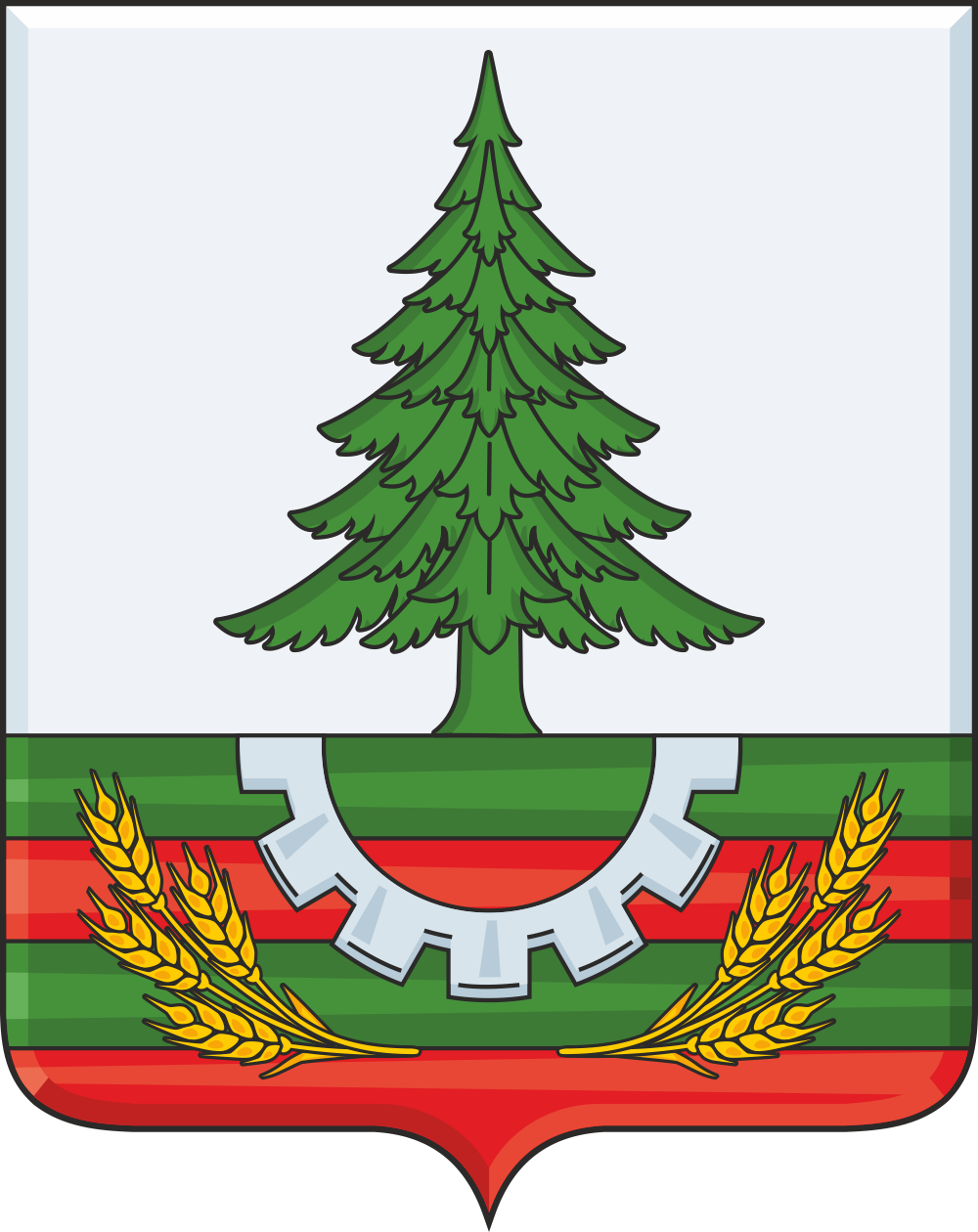
Navlinsky District

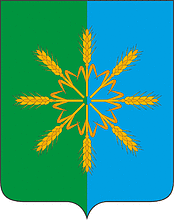
Novozybkovsky District

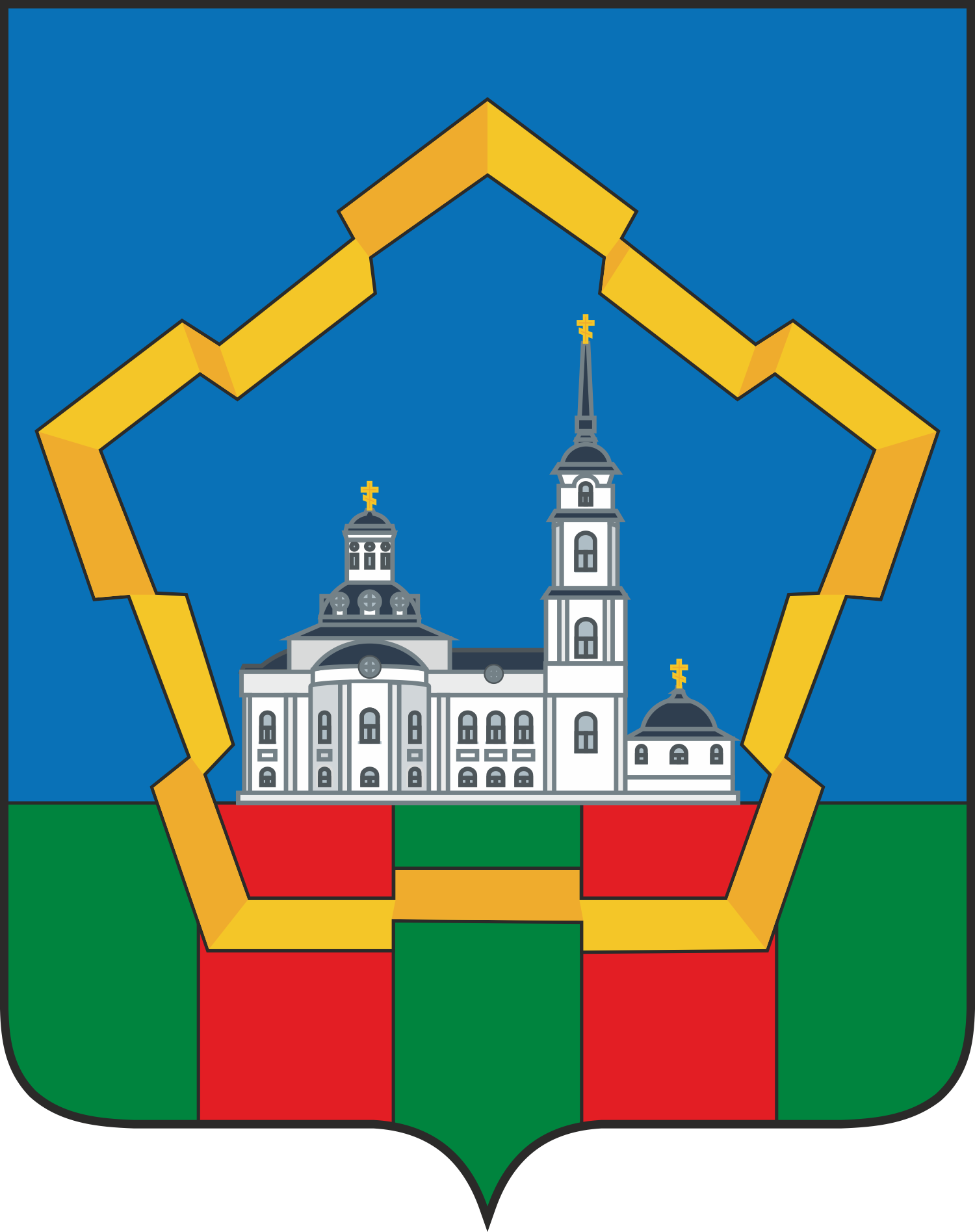
Pochepsky District

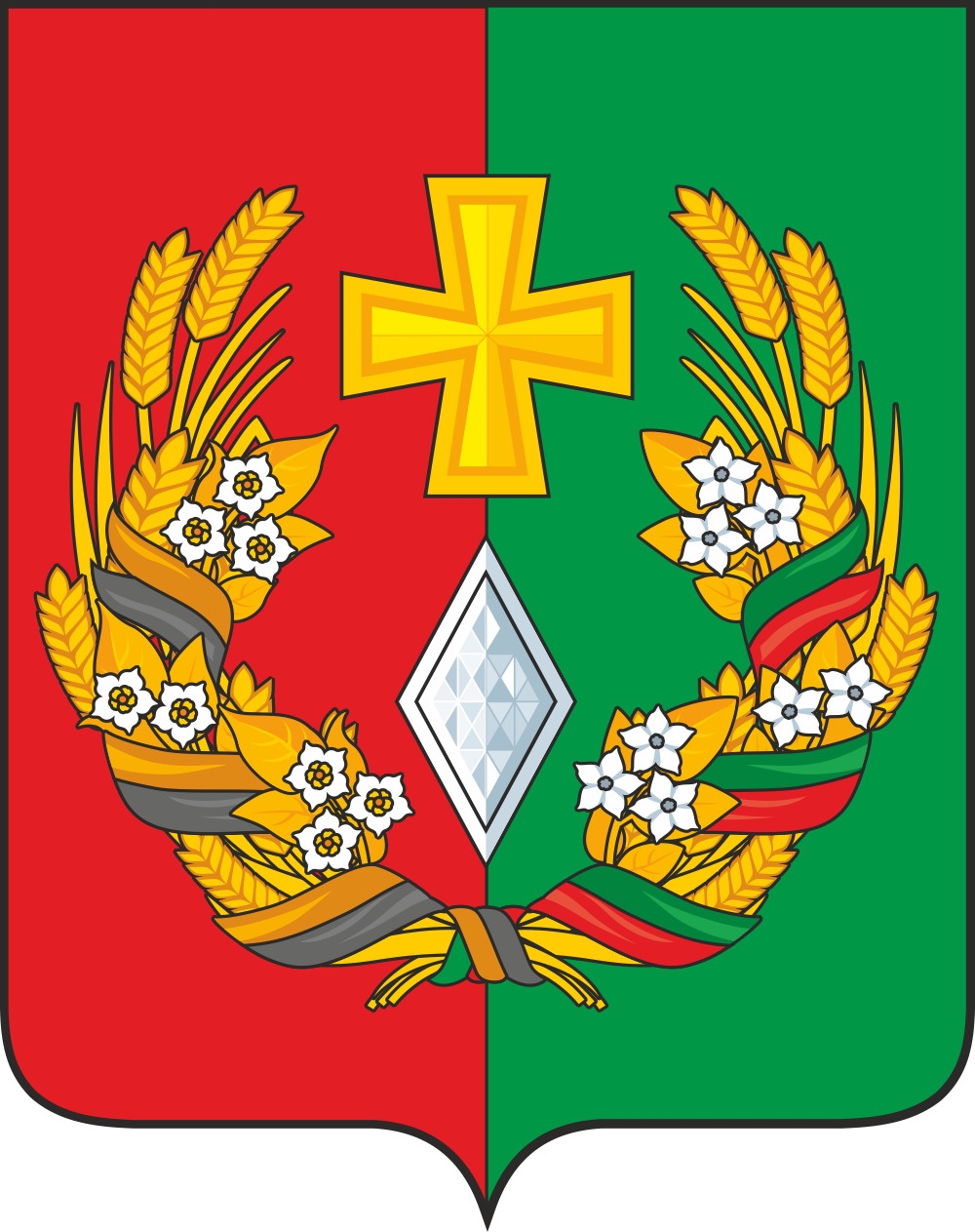
Pogarsky District

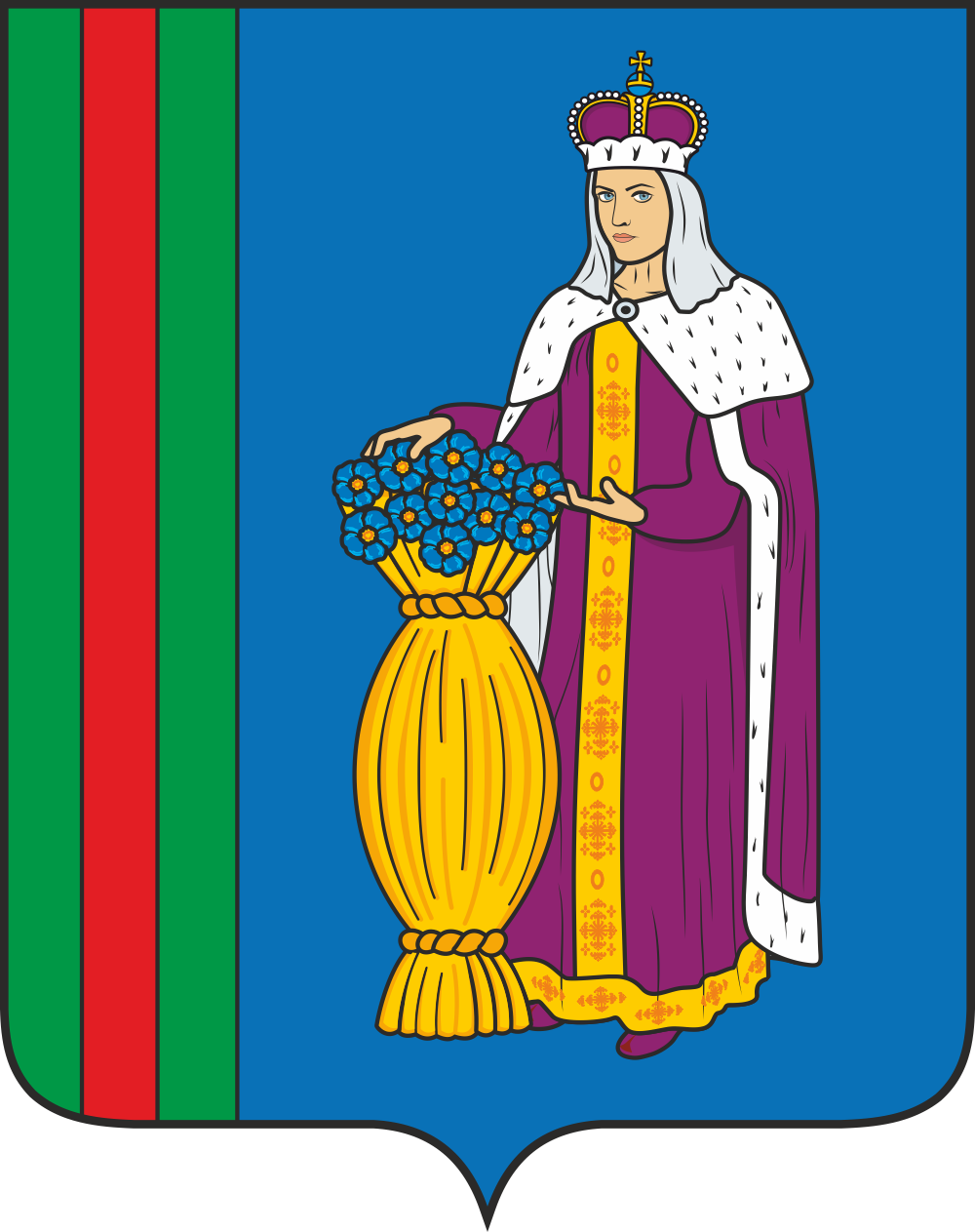
Rognedinsky District

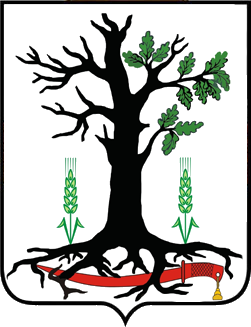
Starodubsky District

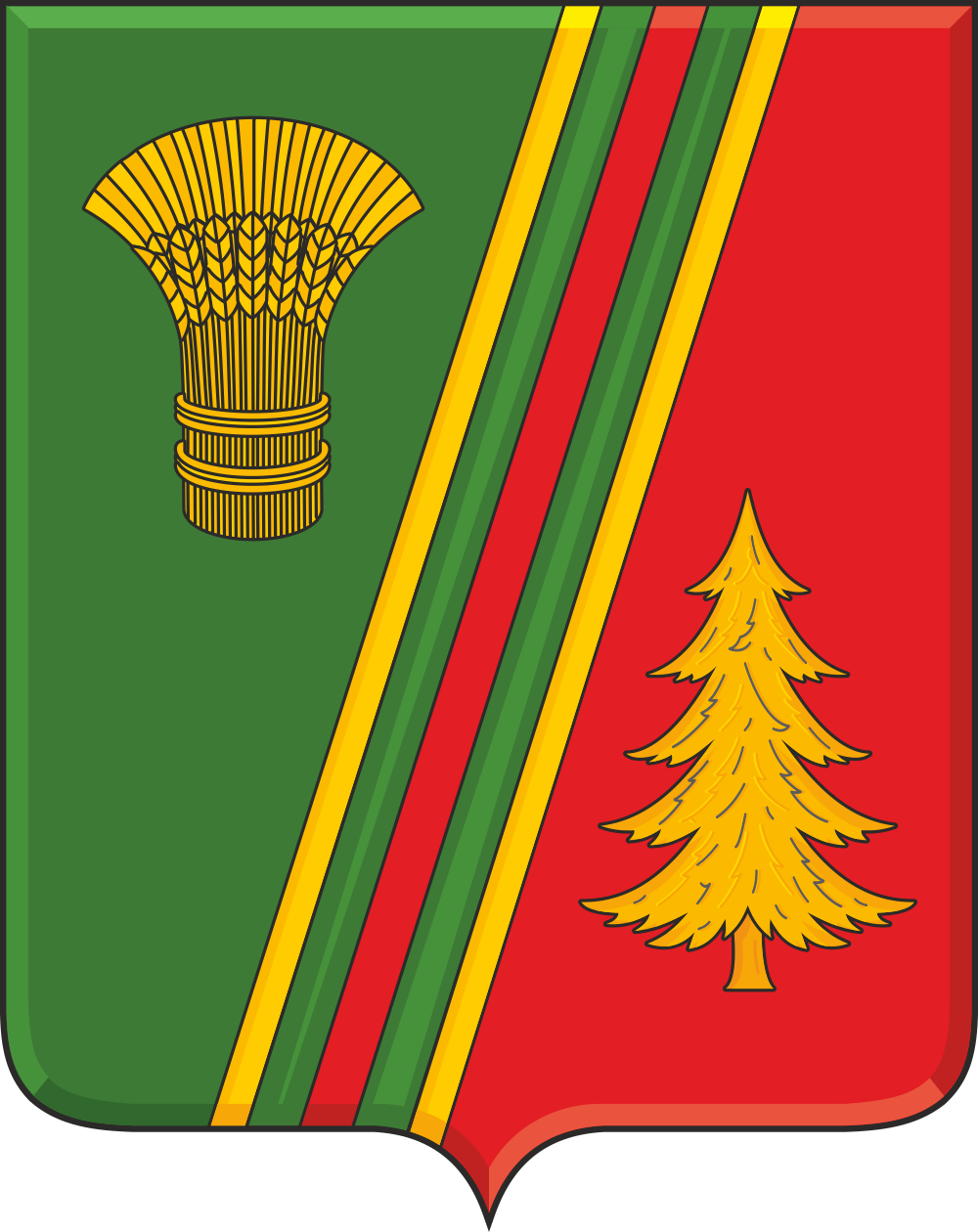
Suzemsky District

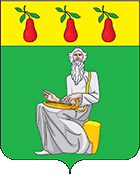
Trubchevsky District

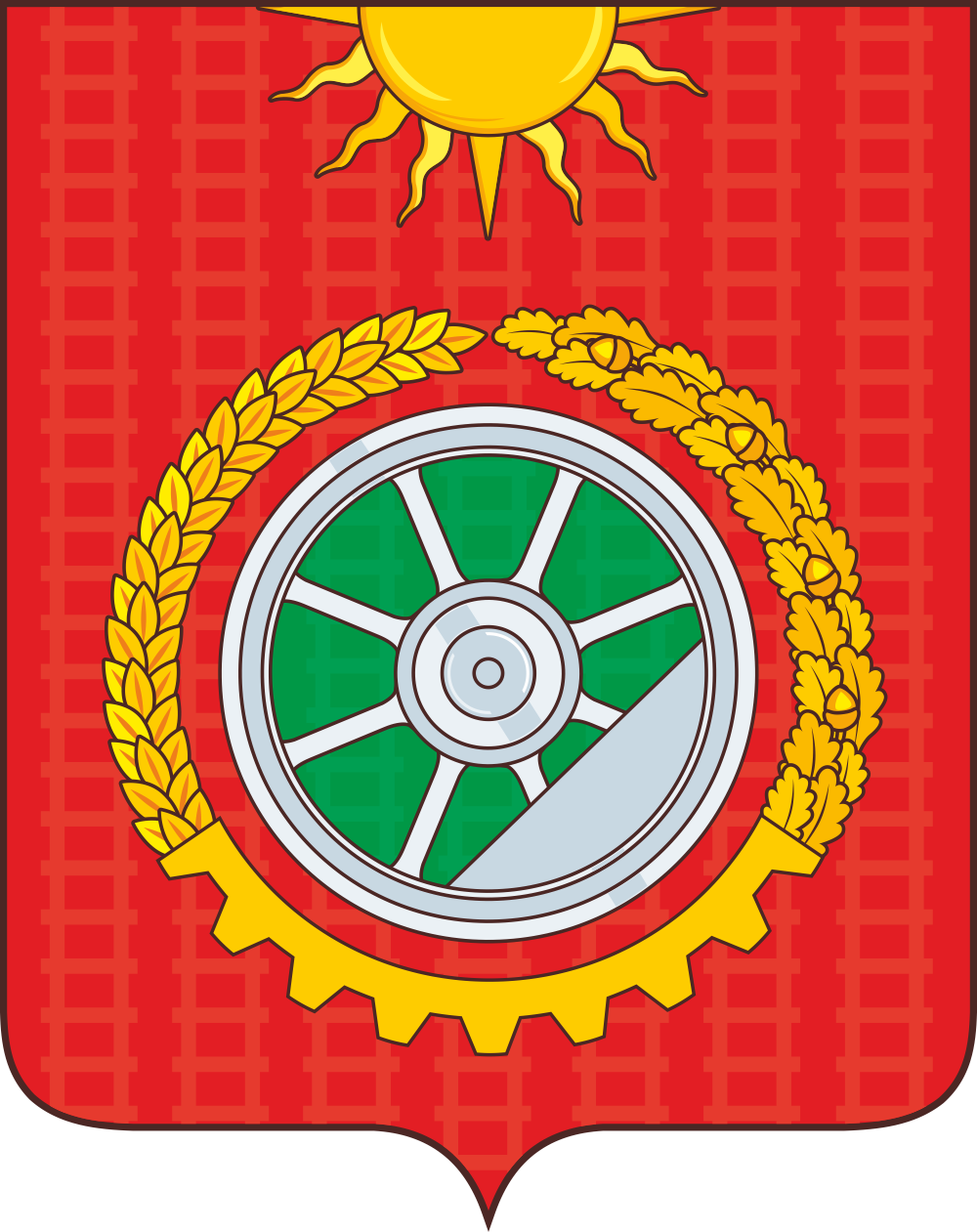
Unechsky District

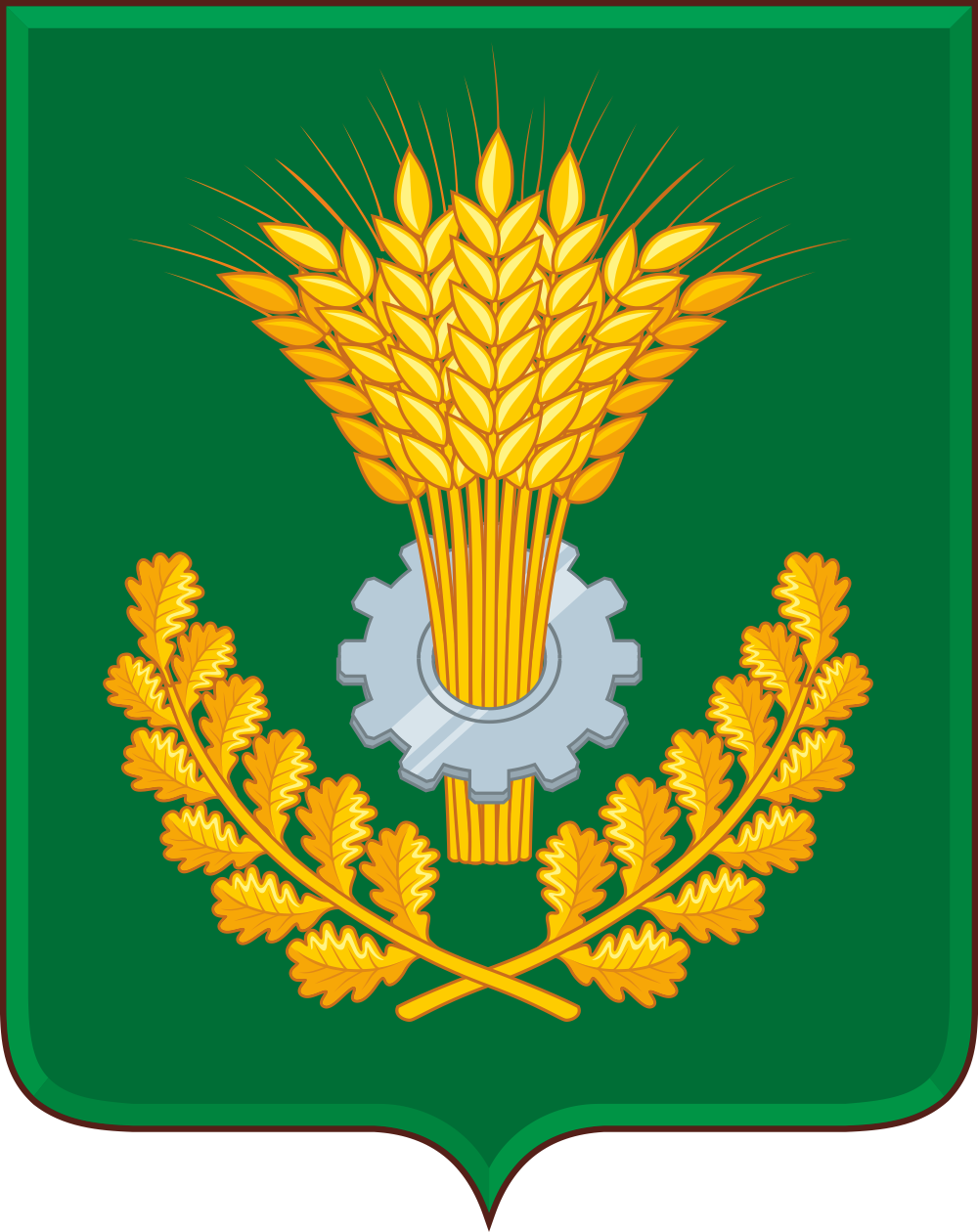
Zhiryatinsky District

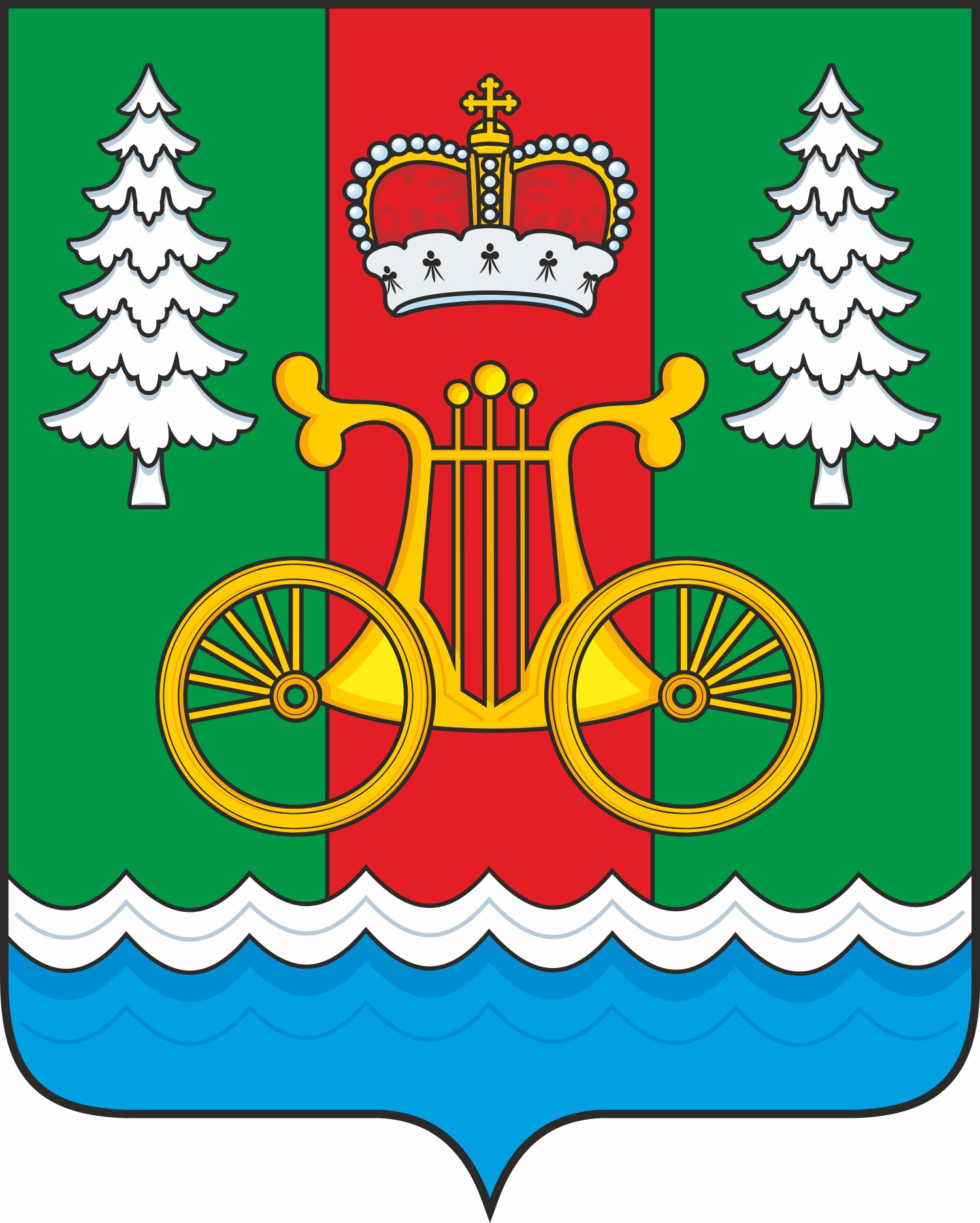
Zhukovsky District

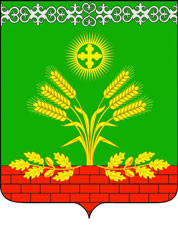
Zlynkovsky District

== Chelyabinsk Oblast ==
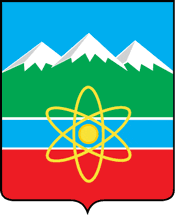
Tryokhgorny

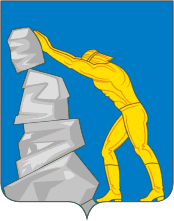
Bakal

Ozyorsk

Snezhinsk

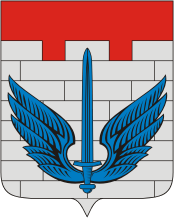
Lokomotivny

Chelyabinsk

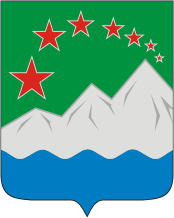
Asha

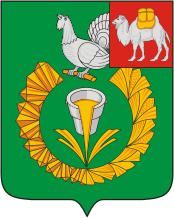
Verkhny Ufaley

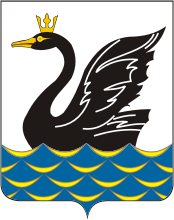
Yemanzhelinsk

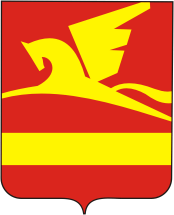
Zlatoust

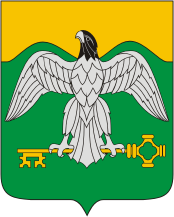
Karabash

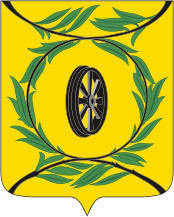
Kartaly

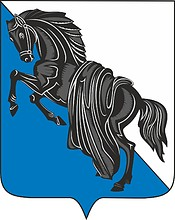
Kasli

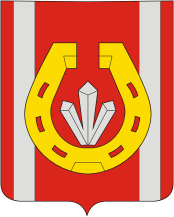
Katav-Ivanovsk

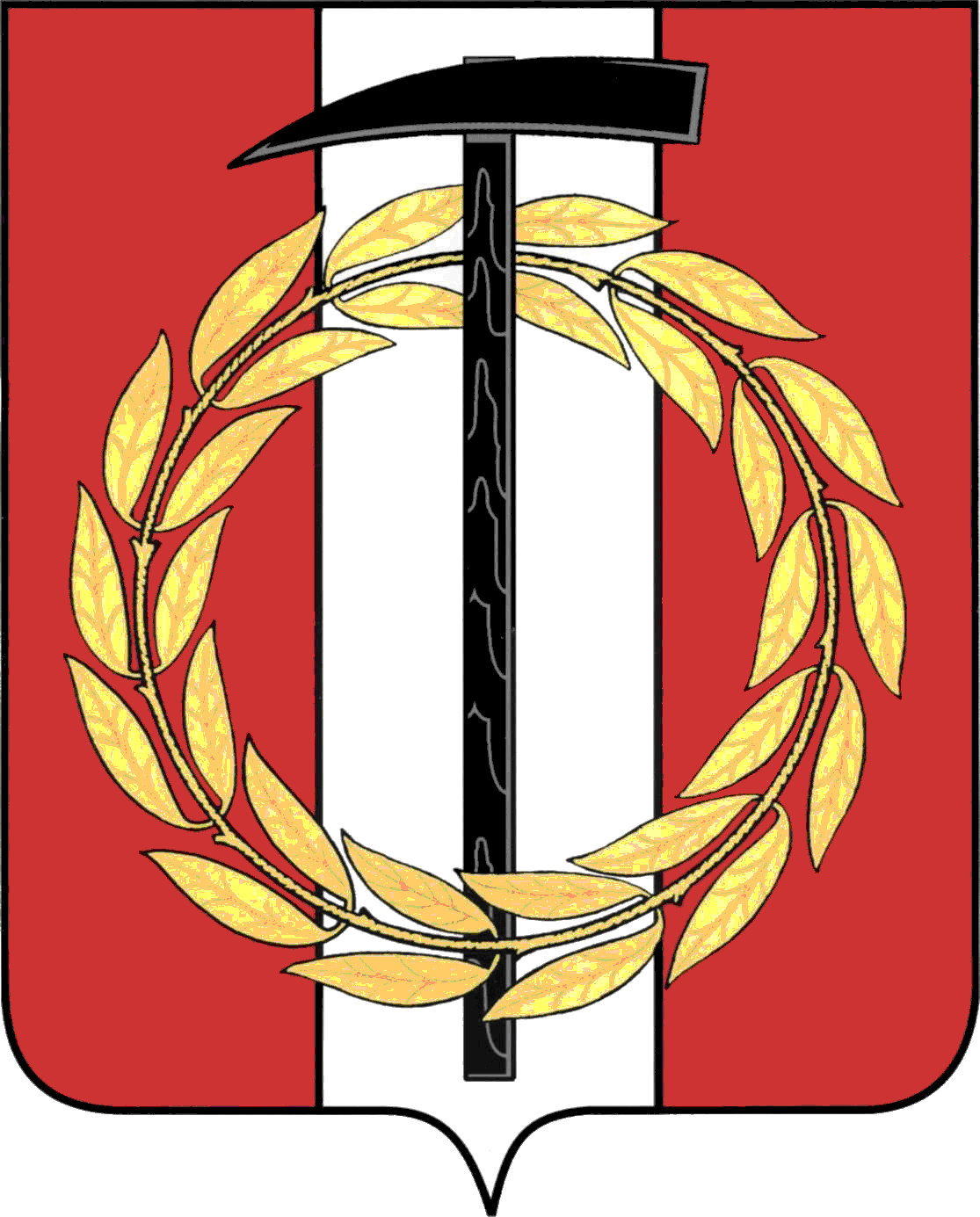
Kopeysk

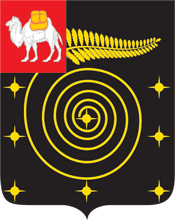
Korkino

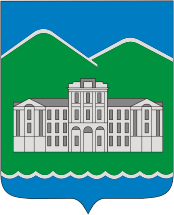
Kyshtym

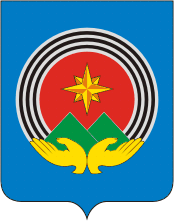
Minyar

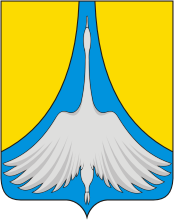
Sim

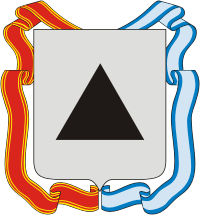
Magnitogorsk

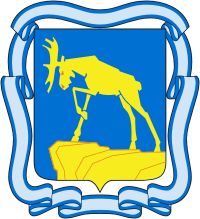
Miass

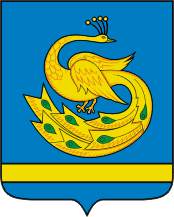
Plast

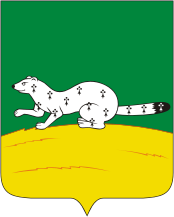
Verkhneuralsk

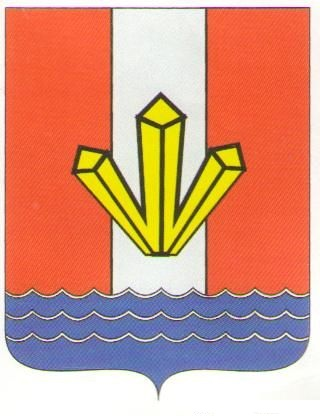
Mezhozyorny

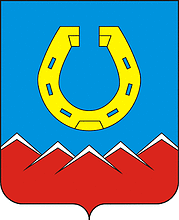
Yuryuzan

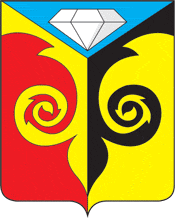
Kusa

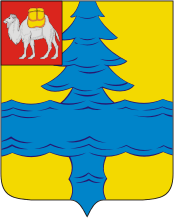
Nyazepetrovsk

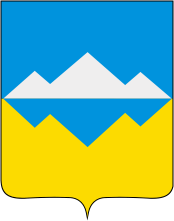
Satka

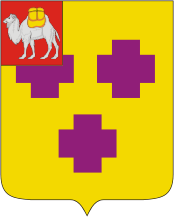
Troitsk

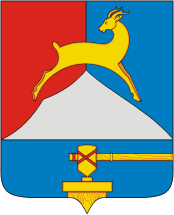
Ust-Katav

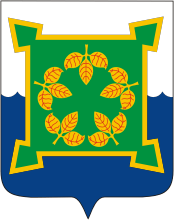
Chebarkul

Yuzhnouralsk

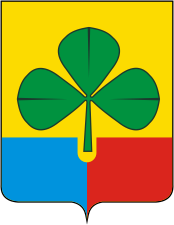
Agapovsky District

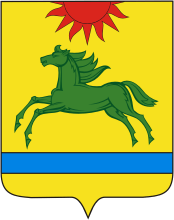
Argayashsky District

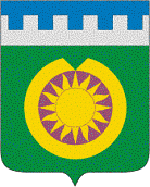
Bredinsky District

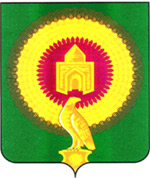
Varnensky District

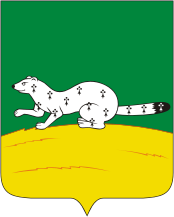
Verkhneuralsky District

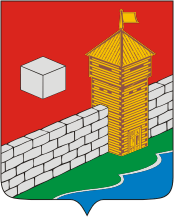
Yetkulsky District

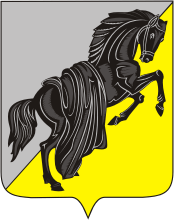
Kaslinsky District

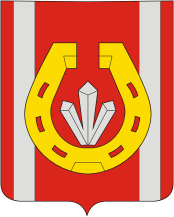
Katav-Ivanovsky District

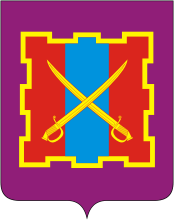
Kizilsky District

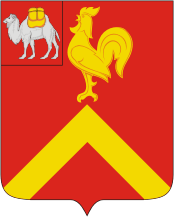
Krasnoarmeysky District

Kunashaksky District

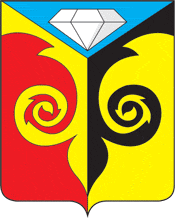
Kusinsky District

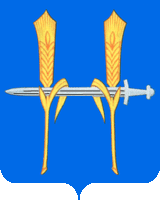
Nagaybaksky District

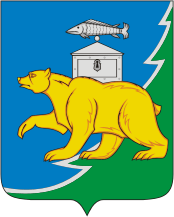
Nyazepetrovsky District

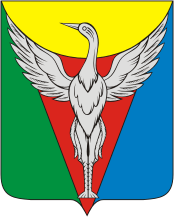
Oktyabrsky District

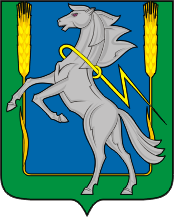
Sosnovsky District

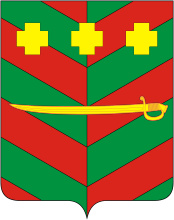
Troitsky District

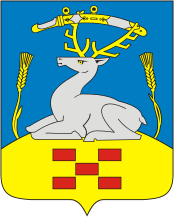
Uvelsky District

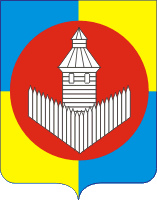
Uysky District

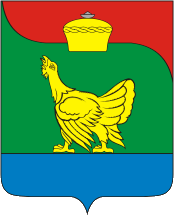
Chebarkulsky District

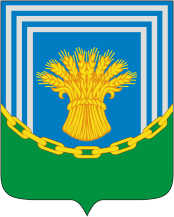
Chesmensky District

== Irkutsk Oblast ==
Irkutsk

Angarsk

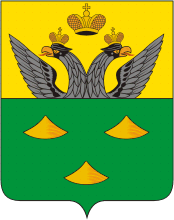
Balagansk

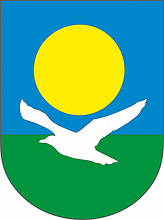
Baykalsk

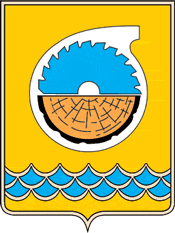
Biryusinsk

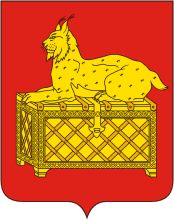
Bodaybo

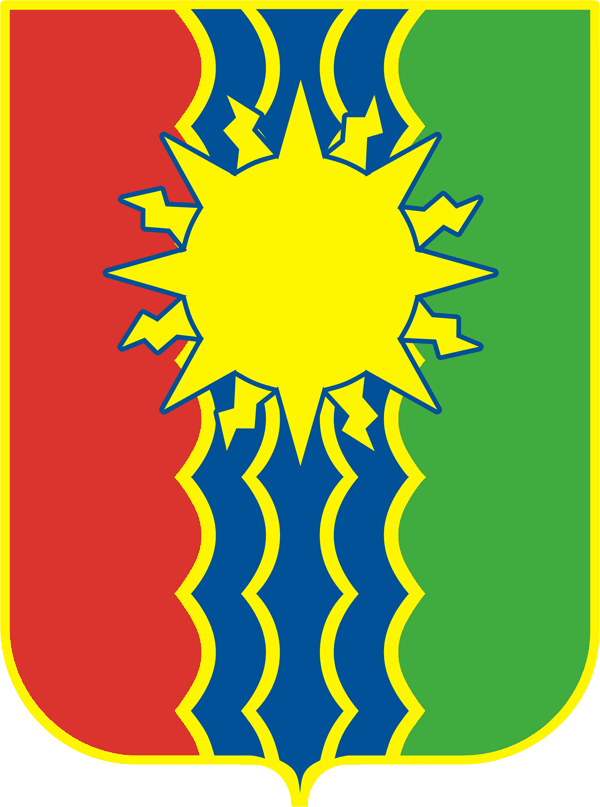
Bratsk

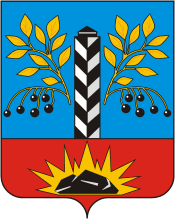
Cheremkhovo

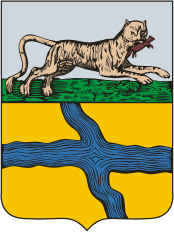
Kirensk

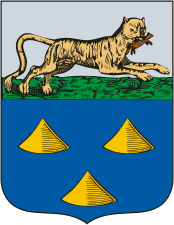
Nizhneudinsk

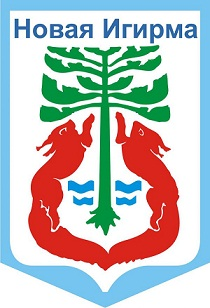
Novaya Igirma

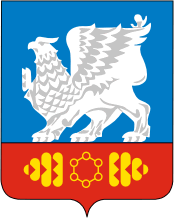
Sayansk

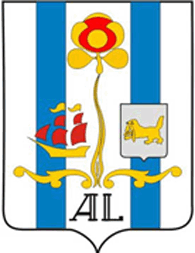
Shelekhov

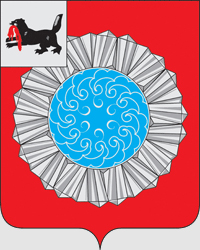
Slyudyanka

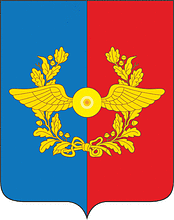
Sredny

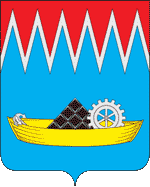
Svirsk

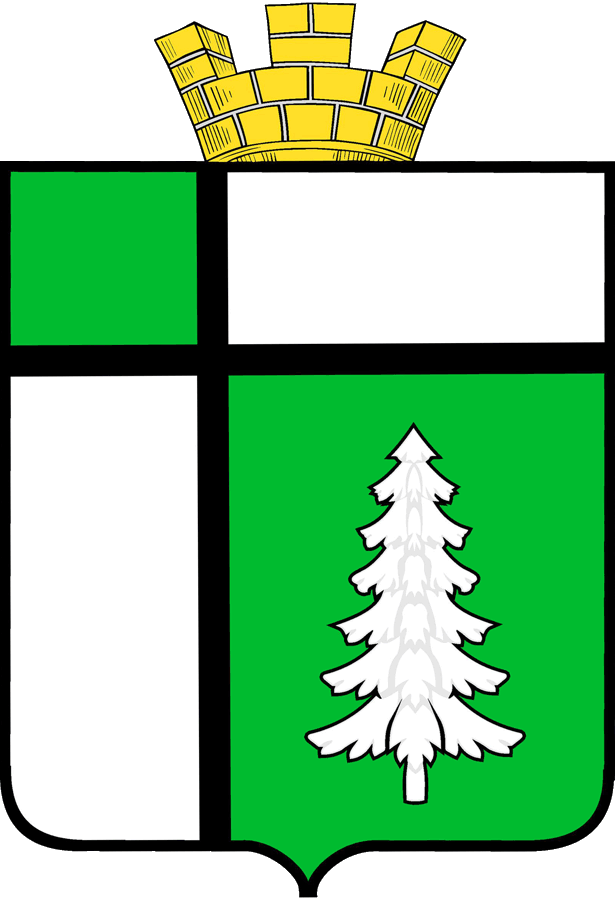
Tayshet

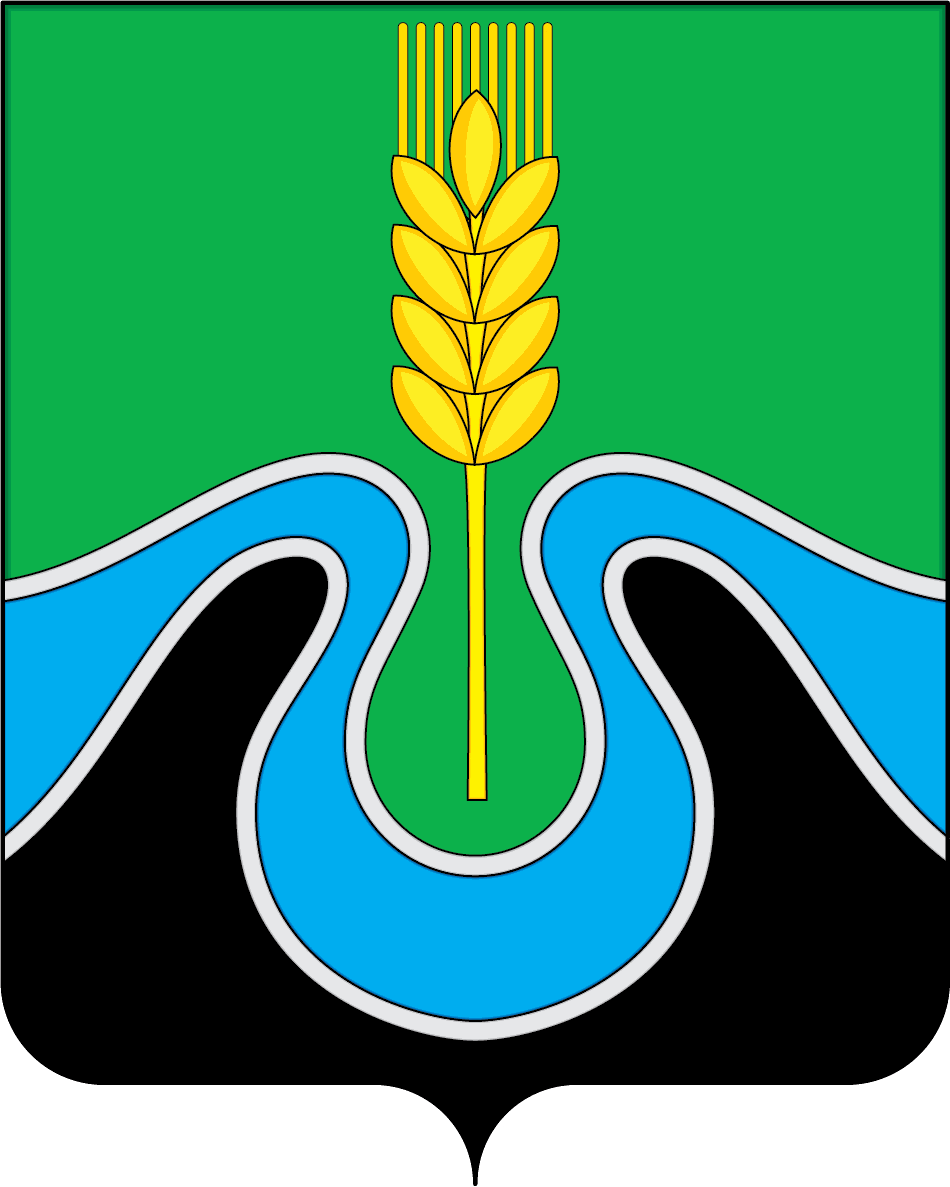
Tulun

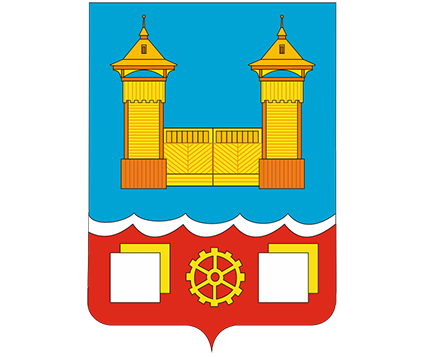
Usolye-Sibirskoye

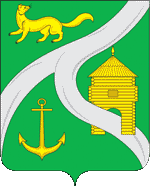
Ust-Kut

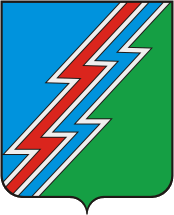
Ust-Ilimsk

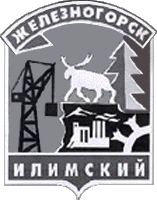
Zheleznogorsk-Ilimsky

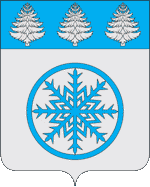
Zima

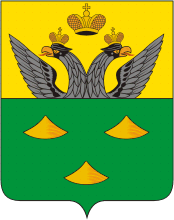
Balagansky District

Bodaybinsky District

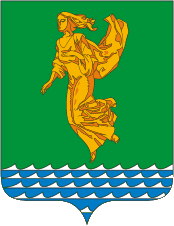
Angarsky District

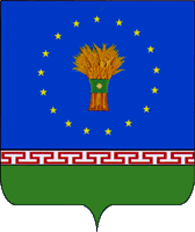
Alarsky District

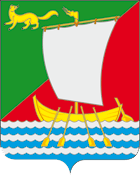
Zhigalovsky District

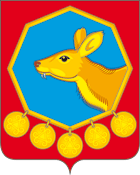
Bayandayevsky District

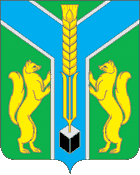
Zalarinsky District

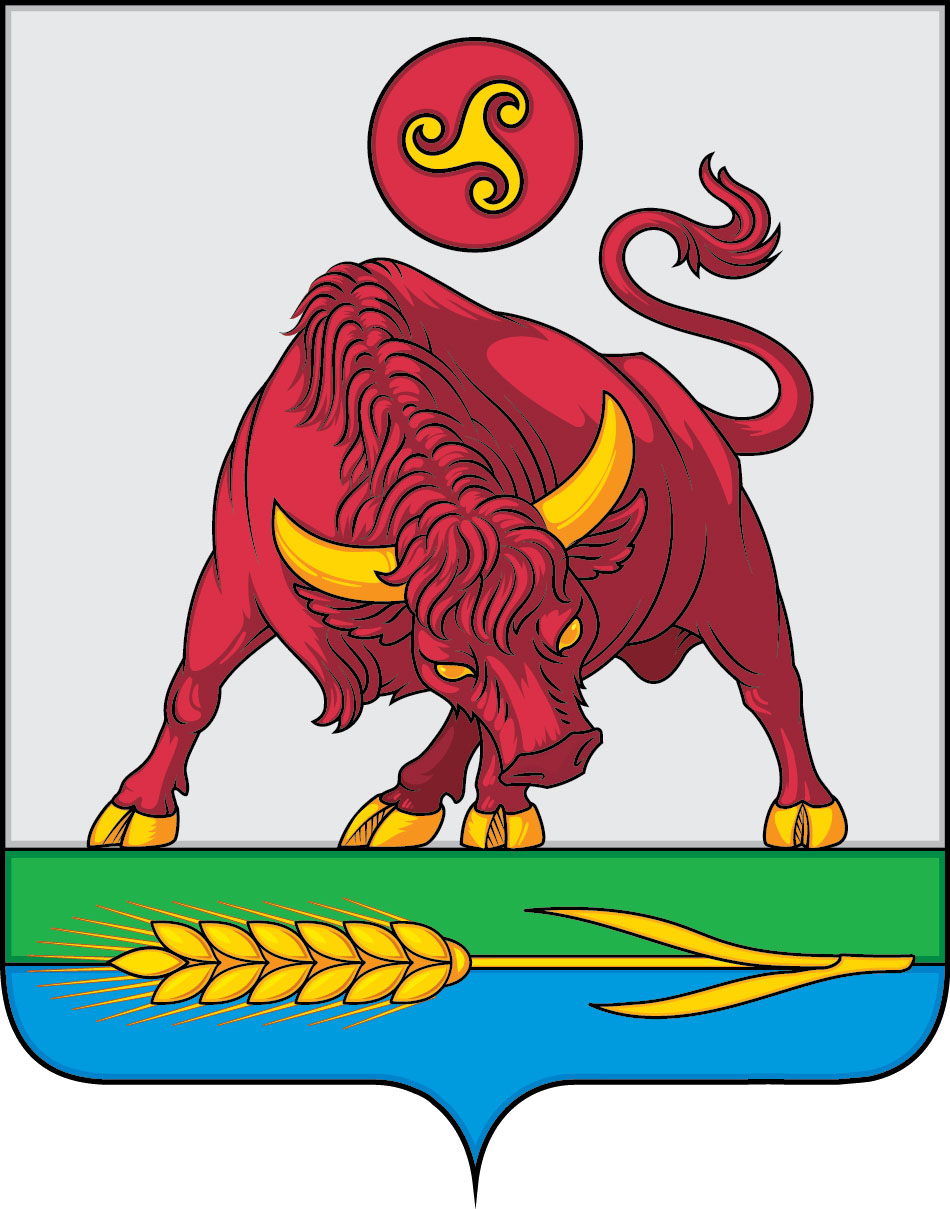
Bokhansky District

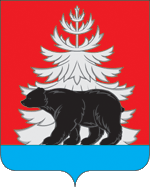
Ziminsky District

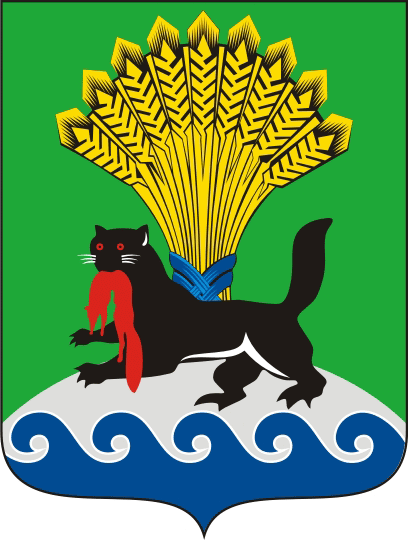
Irkutsky District

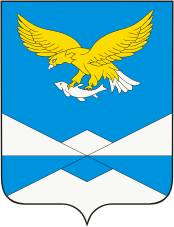
Kazachinsko-Lensky District

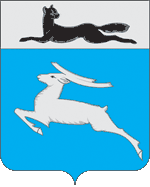
Kachugsky District

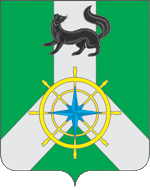
Kirensky District

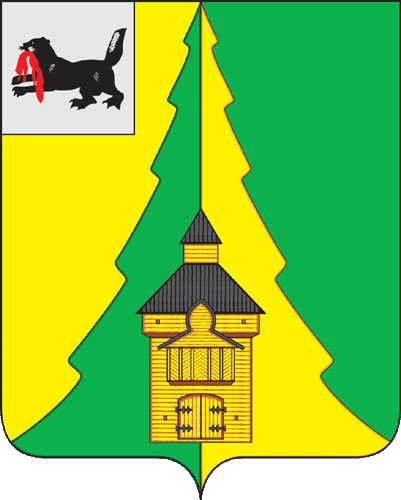
Nizhneilimsky District

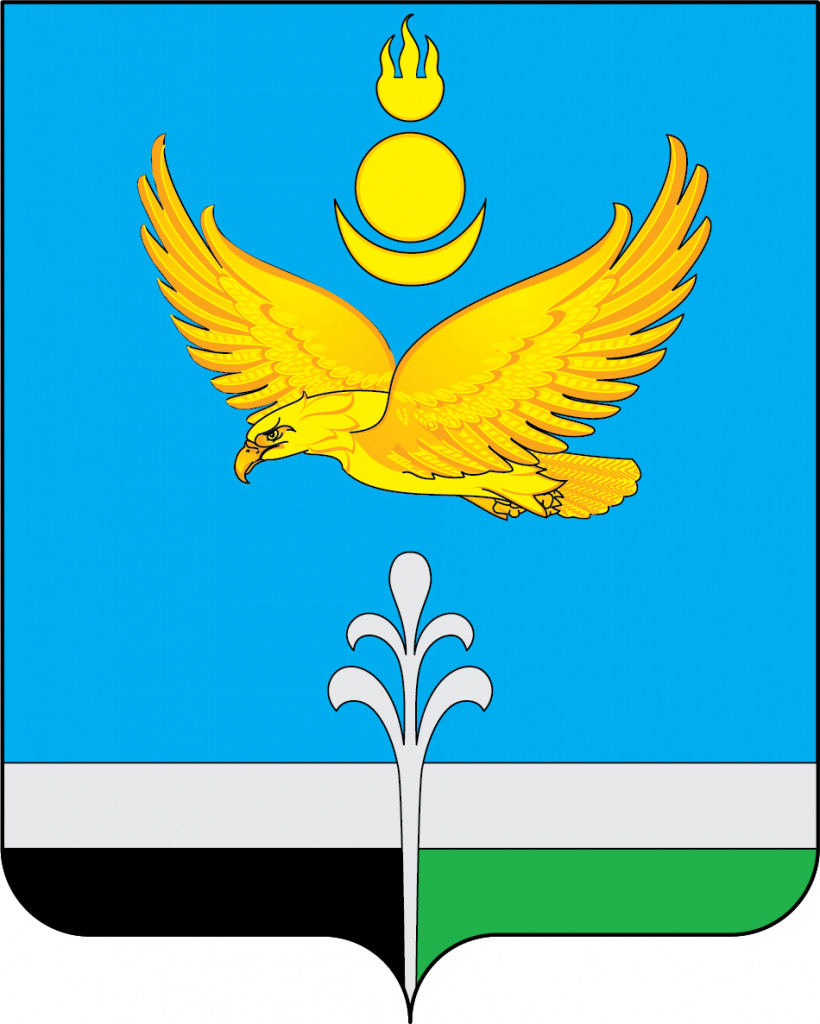
Nukutsky District

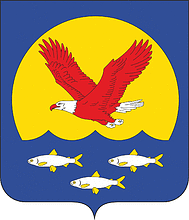
Olkhonsky District

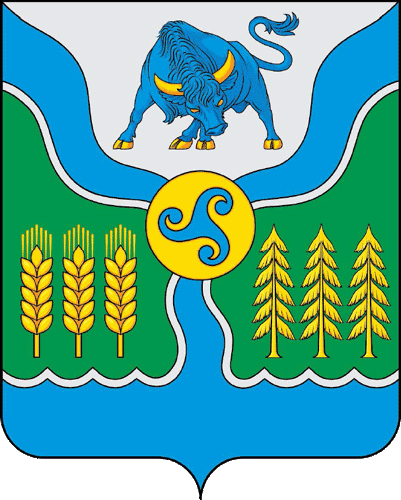
Osinsky District

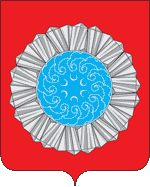
Slyudyansky District

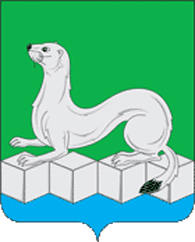
Usolsky District

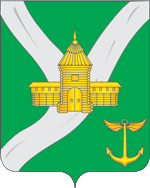
Ust-Kutsky District

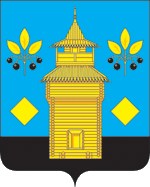
Cheremkhovsky District

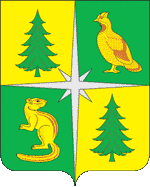
Chunsky District

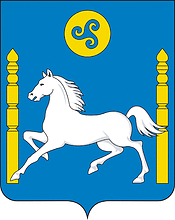
Ekhirit-Bulagatsky District

== Ivanovo Oblast ==
Ivanovo

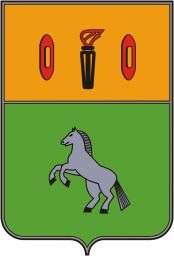
Gavrilov Posad

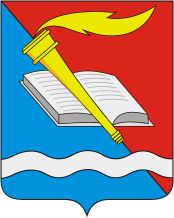
Furmanov

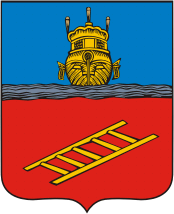
Lukh

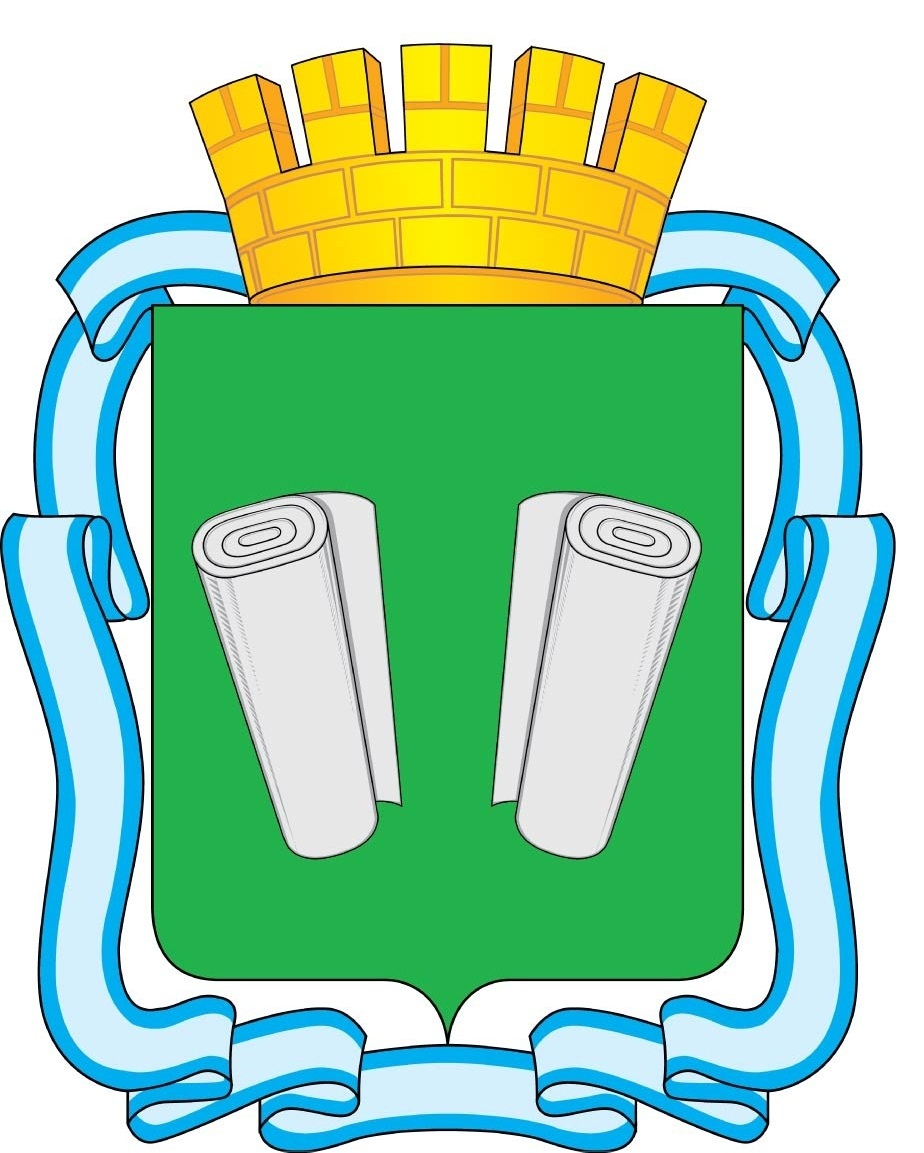
Kineshma

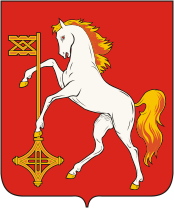
Kokhma

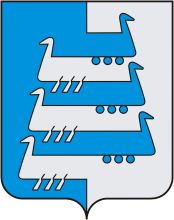
Navoloki

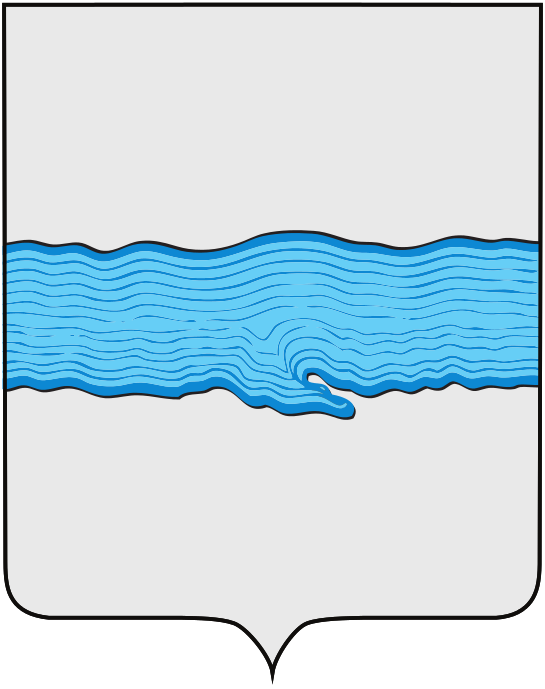
Plyos

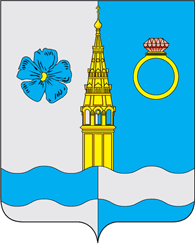
Privolzhsk

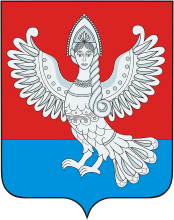
Puchezh

Shuya

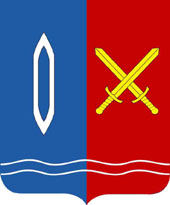
Teykovo

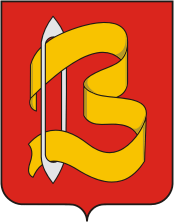
Vichuga

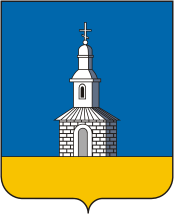
Yuryevets

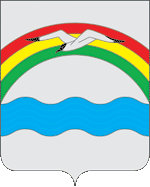
Zavolzhsk

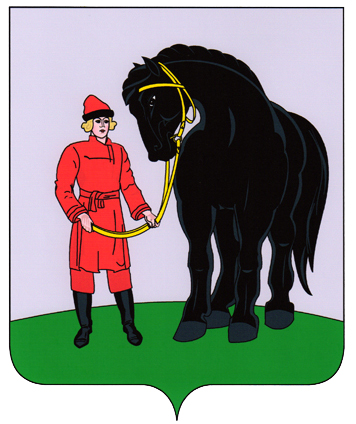
Gavrilovo-Posadsky District

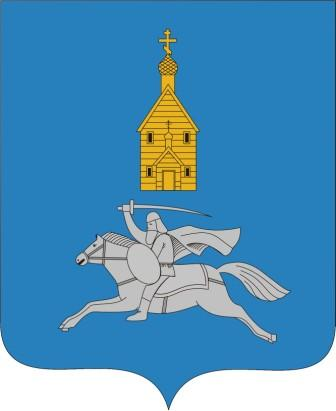
Ilyinsky District

Ivanovsky District

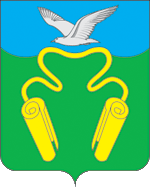
Kineshemsky District

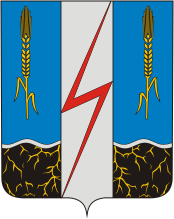
Komsomolsky District

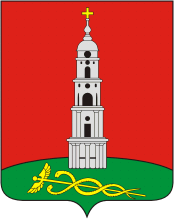
Lezhnevsky District

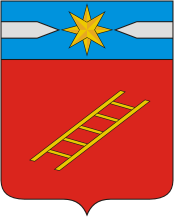
Lukhsky District

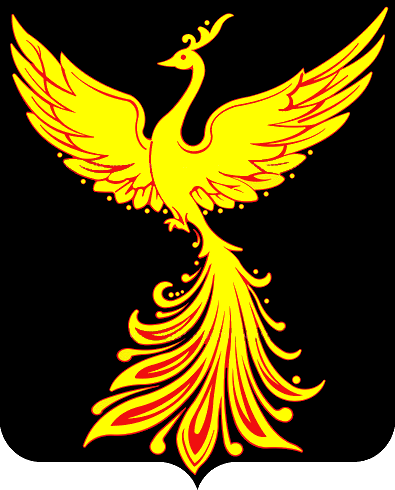
Palekhsky District

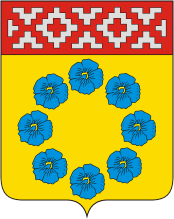
Pestyakovsky District

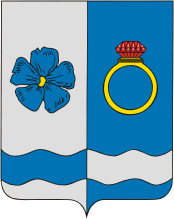
Privolzhsky District

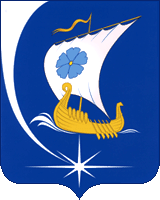
Puchezhsky District

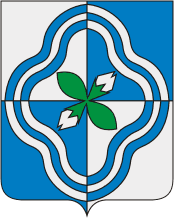
Rodnikovsky District

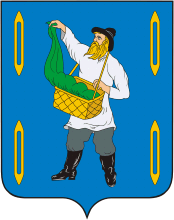
Savinsky District

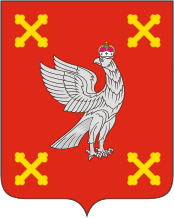
Shuysky District

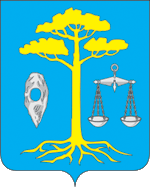
Teykovsky District

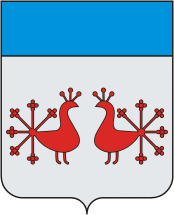
Verkhnelandekhovsky District

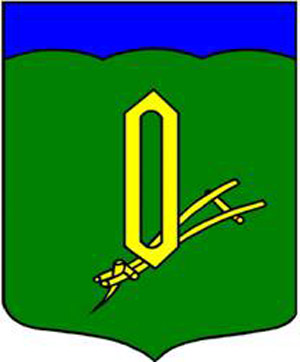
Vichugsky District

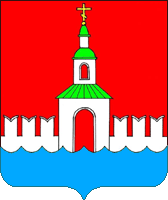
Yuryevetsky District

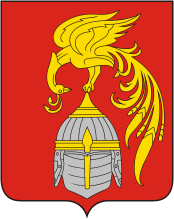
Yuzhsky District

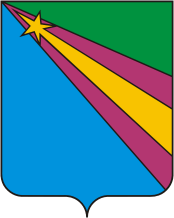
Zavolzhsky District

== Kaliningrad Oblast ==
Kaliningrad

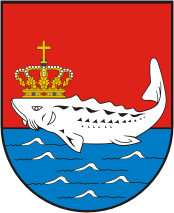
Baltiysk

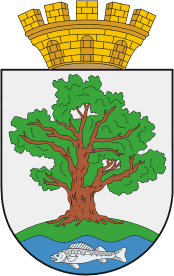
Ladushkin

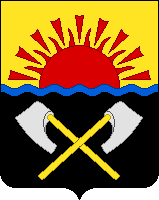
Mamonovo

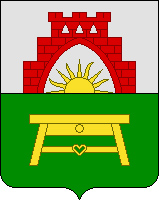
Nesterov

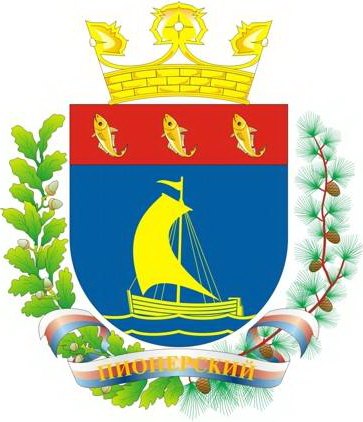
Pionersky

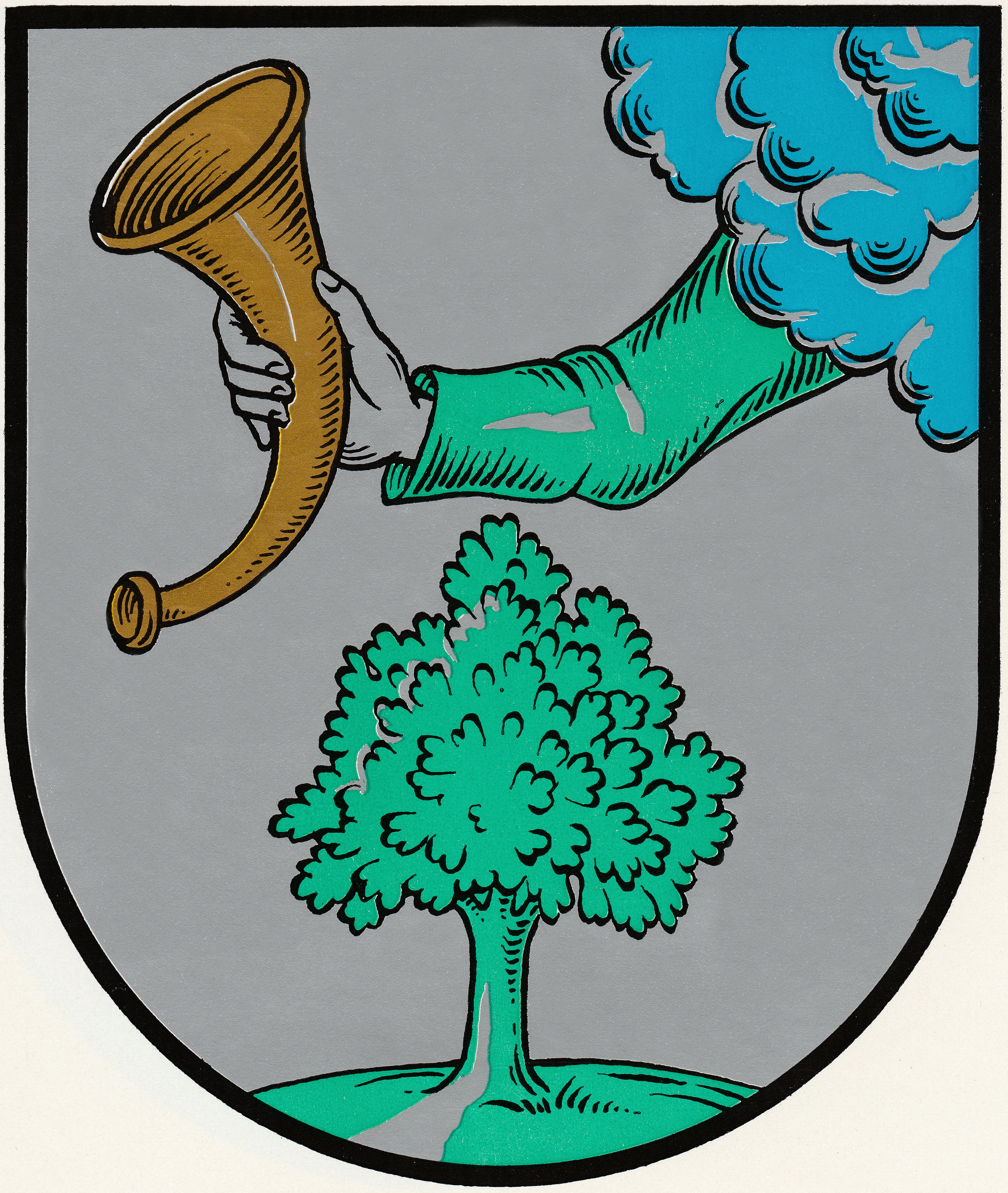
Polessk

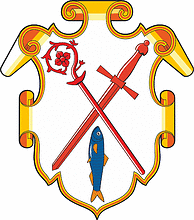
Primorsk

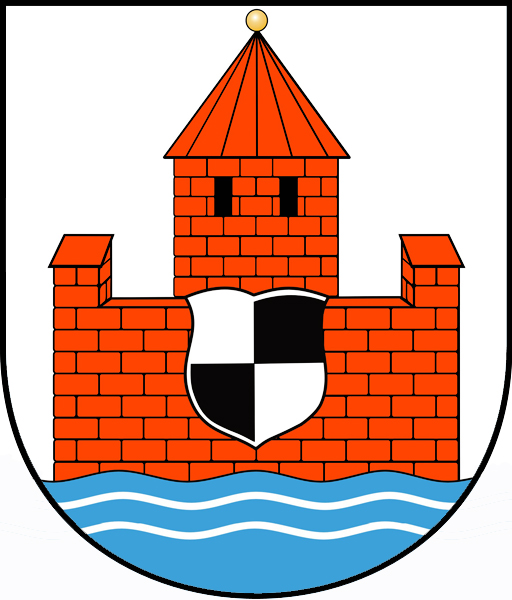
Sovetsk

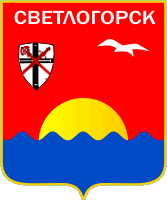
Svetlogorsk

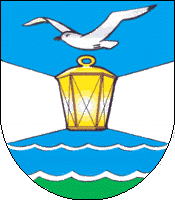
Svetly

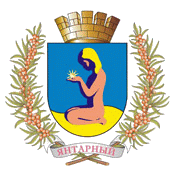
Yantarny

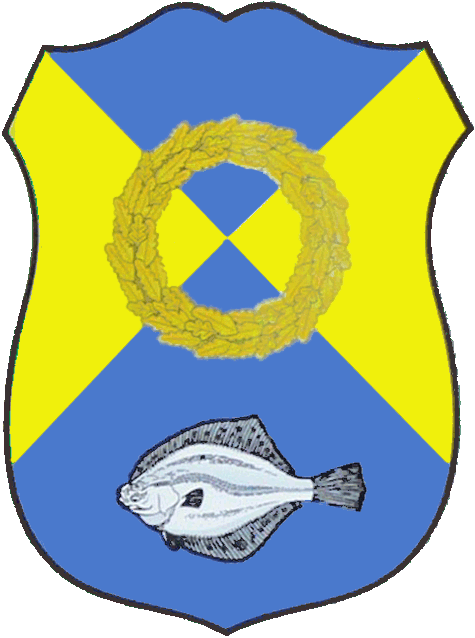
Zelenogradsk

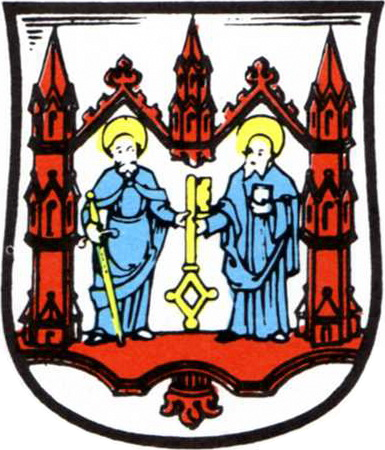
Zheleznodorozhny

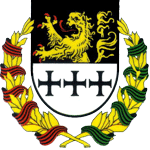
Bagrationovsky District

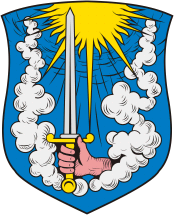
Gvardeysky District

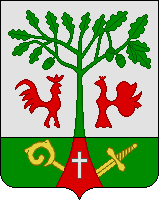
Guryevsky District

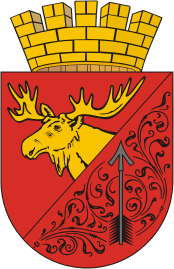
Gusevsky District

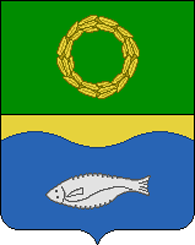
Zelenogradsky District

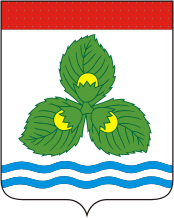
Krasnoznamensky District

Nemansky District

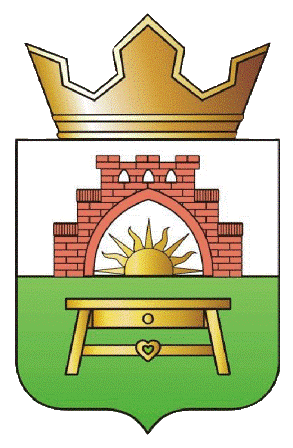
Nesterovsky District

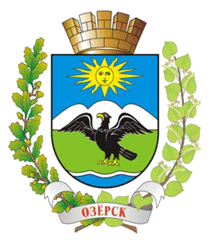
Ozyorsky District

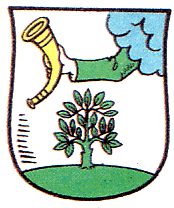
Polessky District

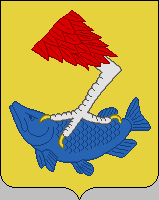
Pravdinsky District

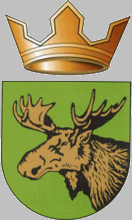
Slavsky District

Chernyakhovsky District

== Kaluga Oblast ==
Kaluga

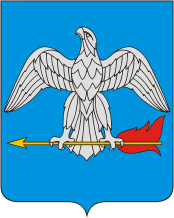
Balabanovo

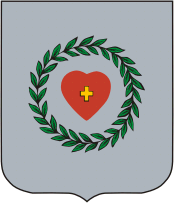
Borovsk

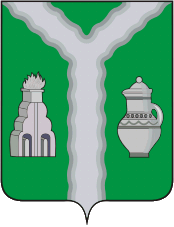
Kirov

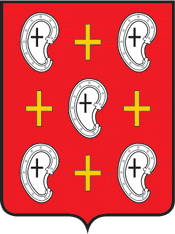
Kozelsk

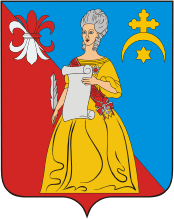
Kremyonki

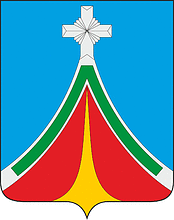
Lyudinovo

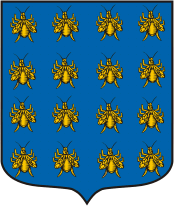
Medyn

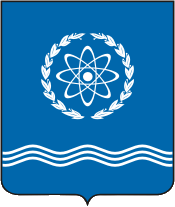
Obninsk

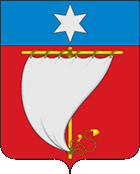
Polotnyany Zavod

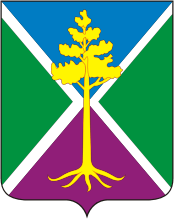
Sosensky

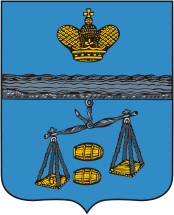
Sukhinichi

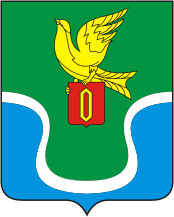
Yermolino

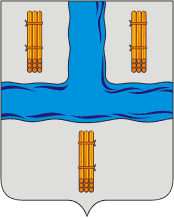
Zhizdra

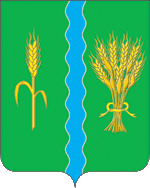
Babyninsky District

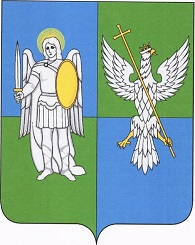
Baryatinsky District

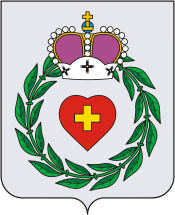
Borovsky District

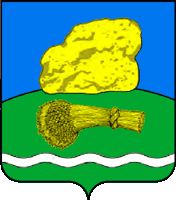
Duminichsky District

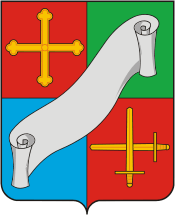
Dzerzhinsky District

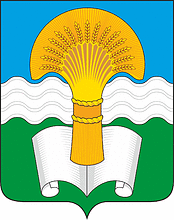
Ferzikovsky District

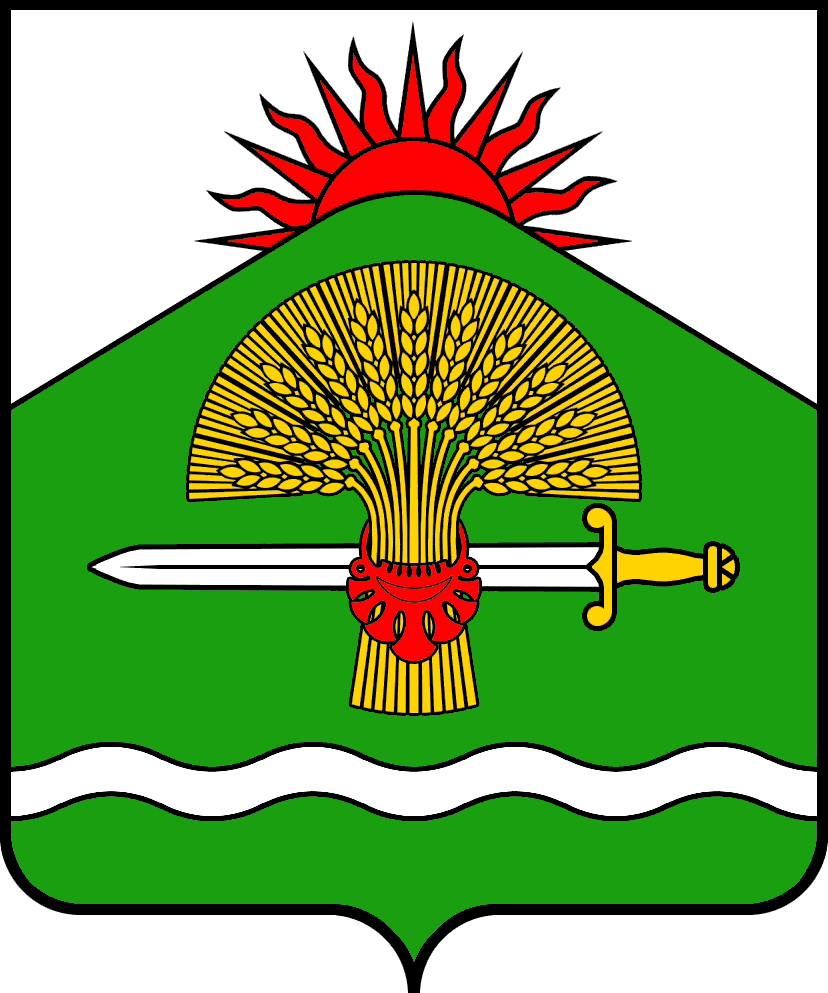
Iznoskovsky District

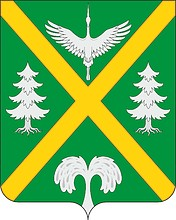
Khvastovichsky District

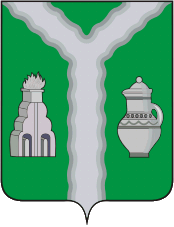
Kirovsky District

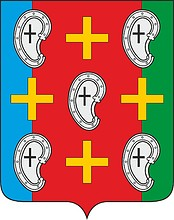
Kozelsky District

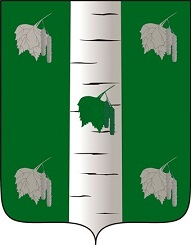
Kuybyshevsky District

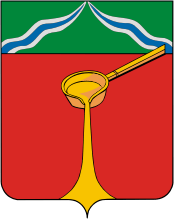
Lyudinovsky District

Maloyaroslavetsky District

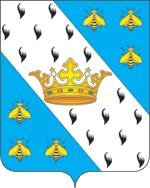
Medynsky District

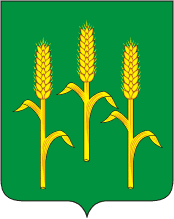
Meshchovsky District

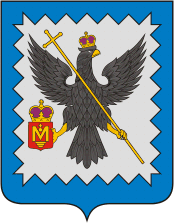
Mosalsky District

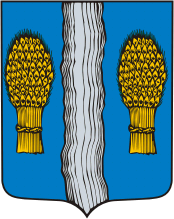
Peremyshlsky District

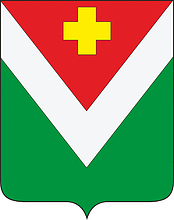
Spas-Demensky District

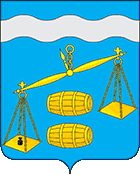
Sukhinichsky District

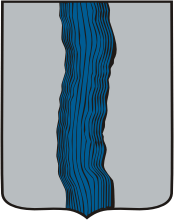
Tarussky District

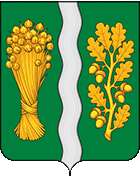
Ulyanovsky District

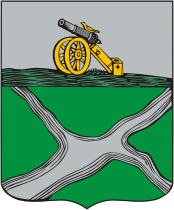
Yukhnovsky District

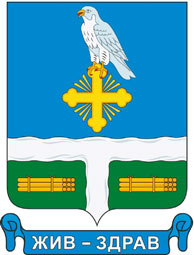
Zhizdrinsky District

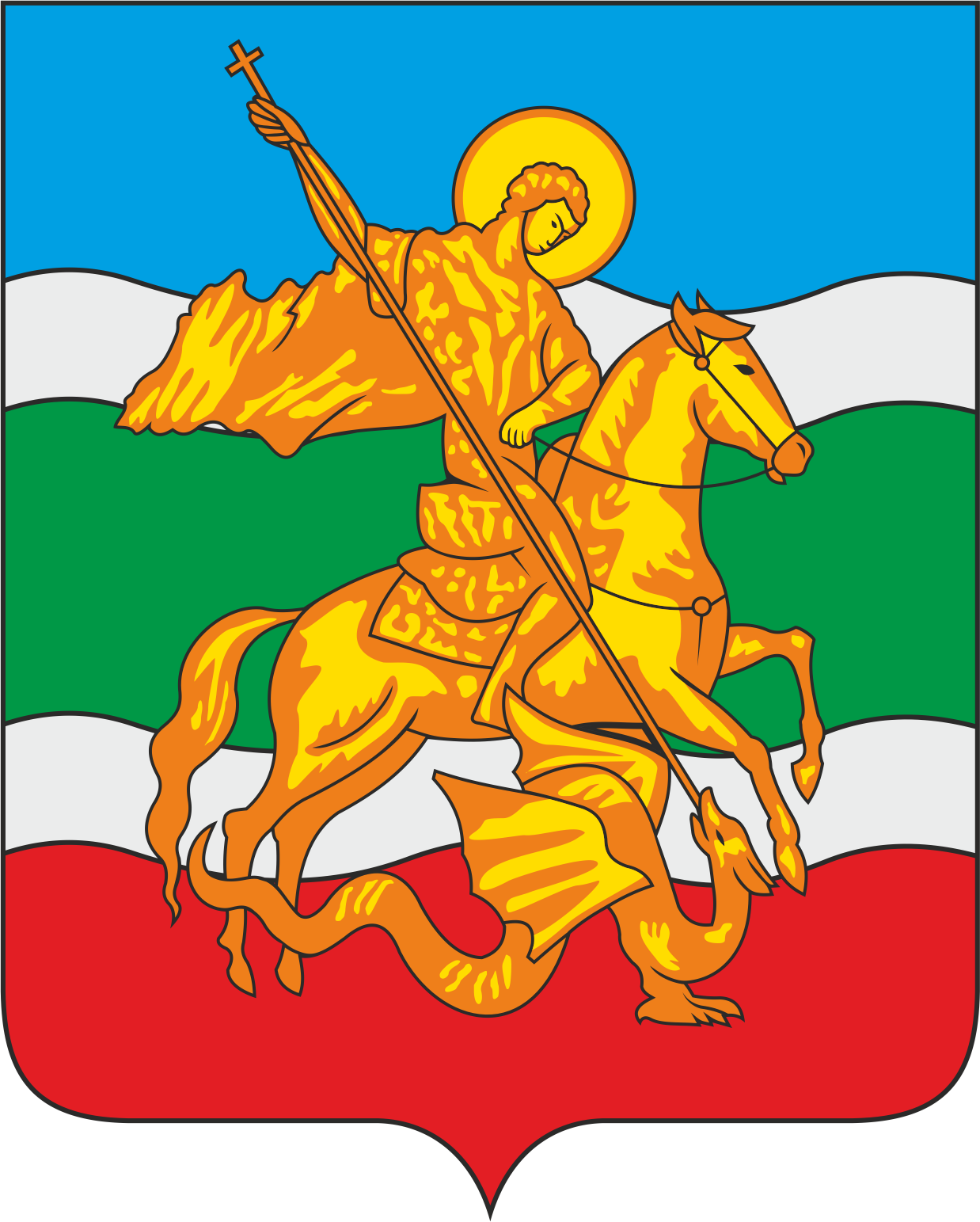
Zhukovsky District

== Kemerovo Oblast ==
Kemerovo

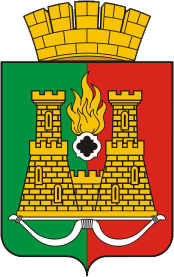
Anzhero-Sudzhensk

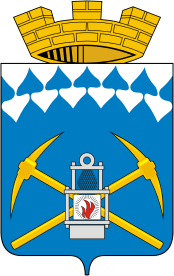
Belovo

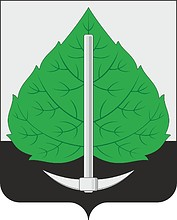
Beryozovsky

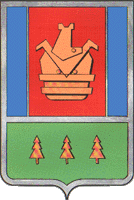
Guryevsk

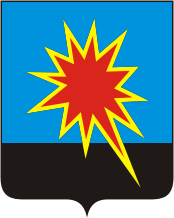
Kaltan

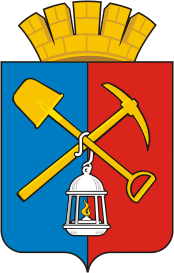
Kiselyovsk

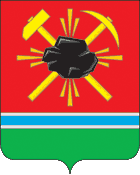
Leninsk-Kuznetsky

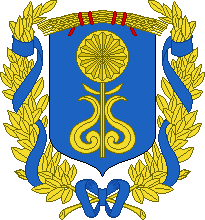
Mariinsk

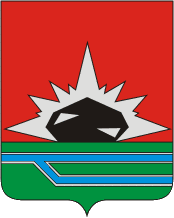
Mezhdurechensk

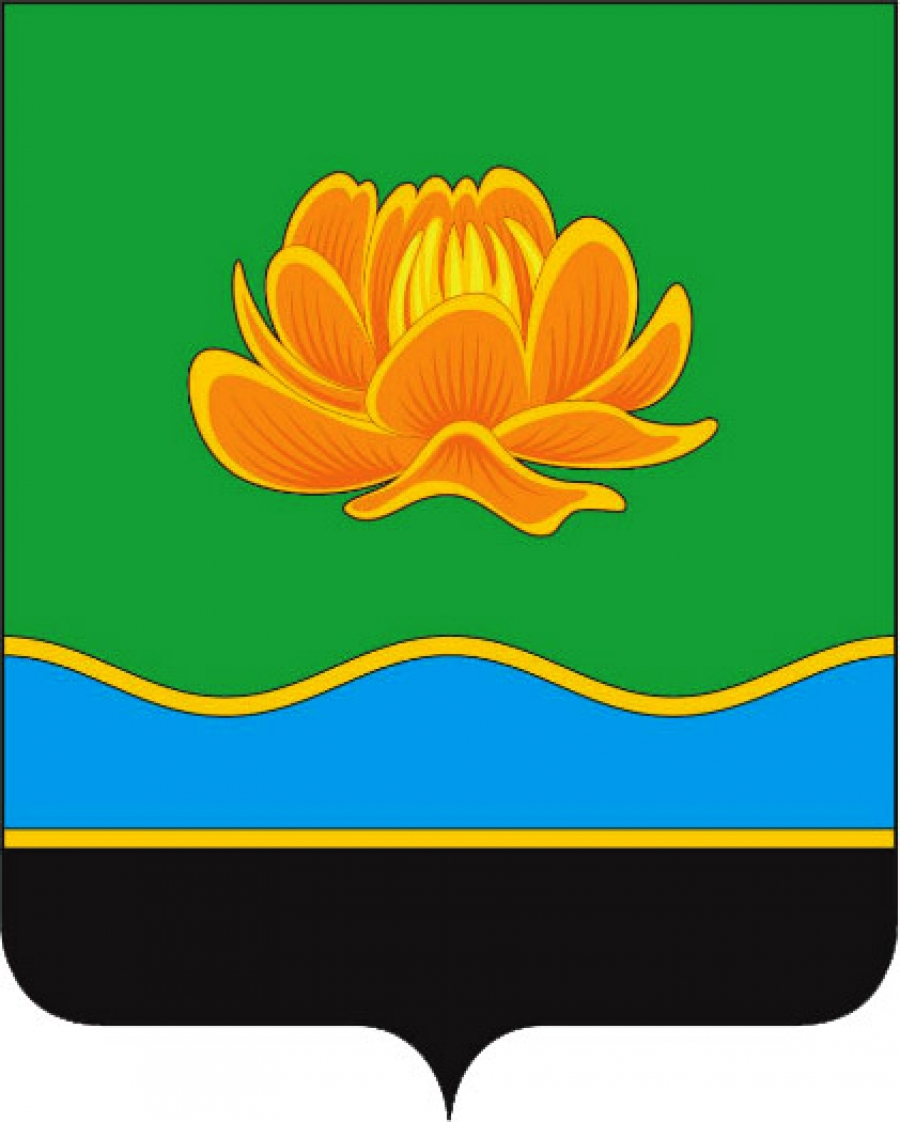
Myski

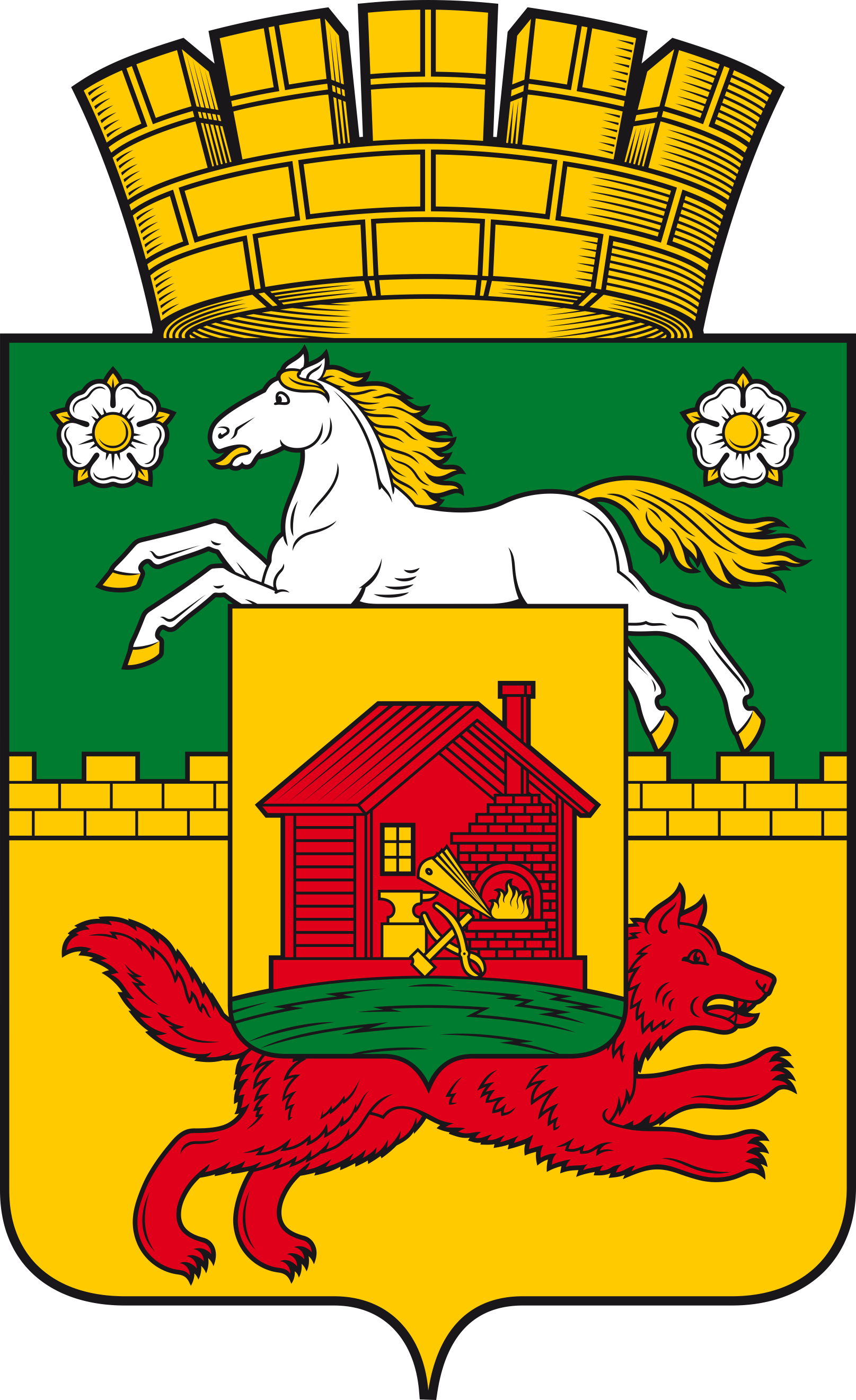
Novokuznetsk

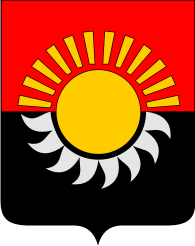
Osinniki

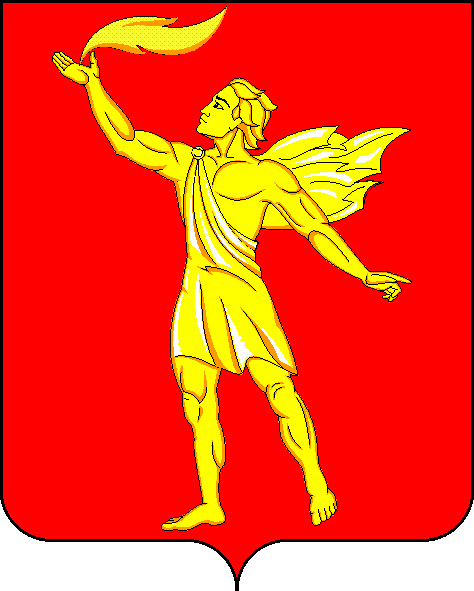
Polysayevo

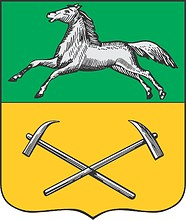
Prokopyevsk

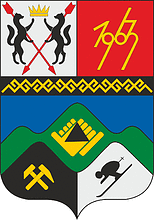
Tashtagol

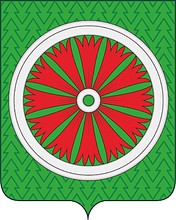
Tayga

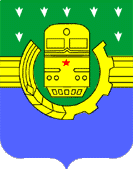
Topki

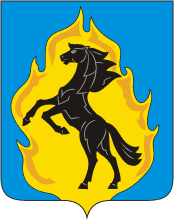
Yurga

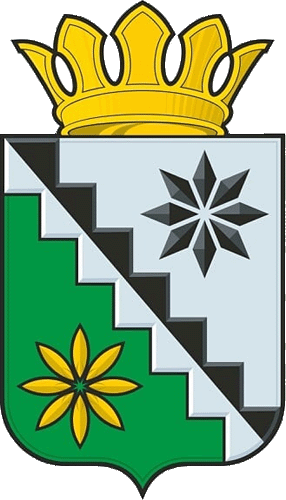
Belovsky District

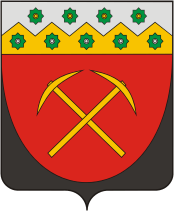
Guryevsky District

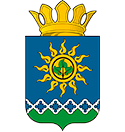
Izhmorsky District

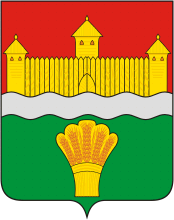
Kemerovsky District

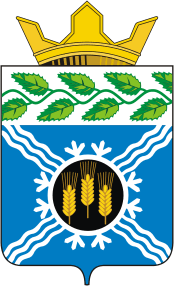
Krapivinsky District

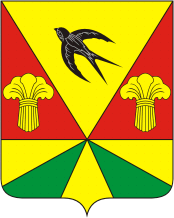
Leninsk-Kuznetsky District

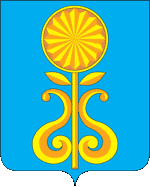
Mariinsky District

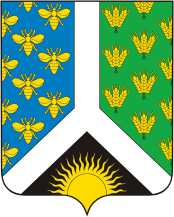
Novokuznetsky District

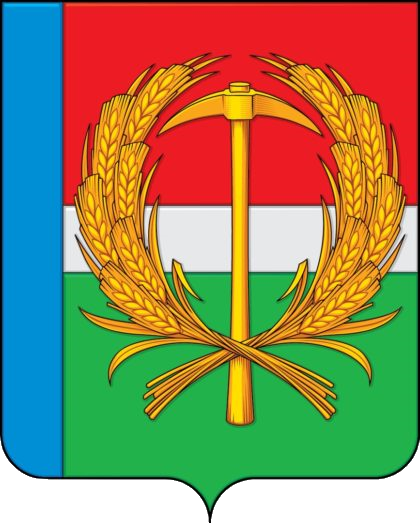
Prokopyevsky District

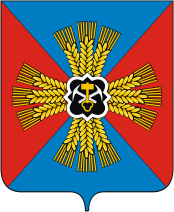
Promyshlennovsky District

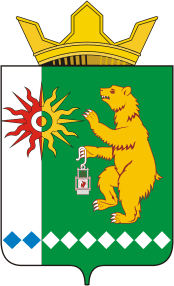
Tisulsky District

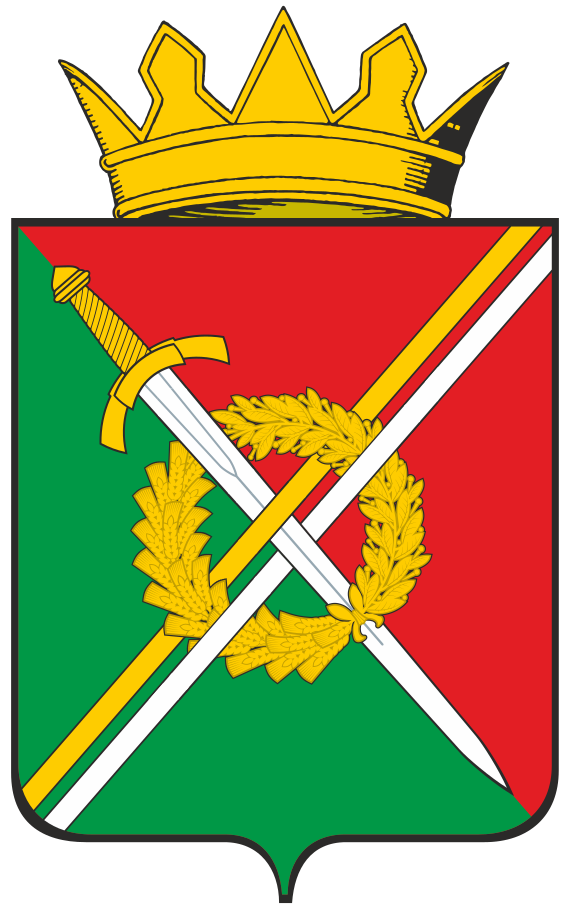
Tyazhinsky District

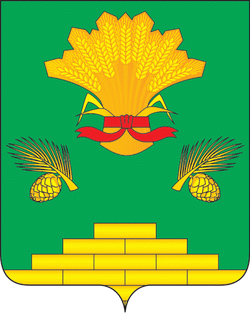
Yashkinsky District

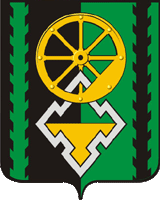
Yaysky District

== Kirov Oblast ==
Kirov

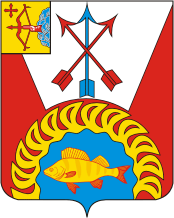
Belaya Kholunitsa

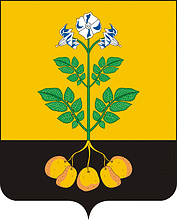
Falyonki

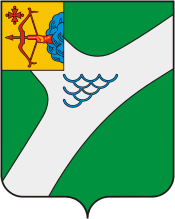
Kirovo-Chepetsk

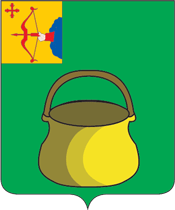
Kotelnich

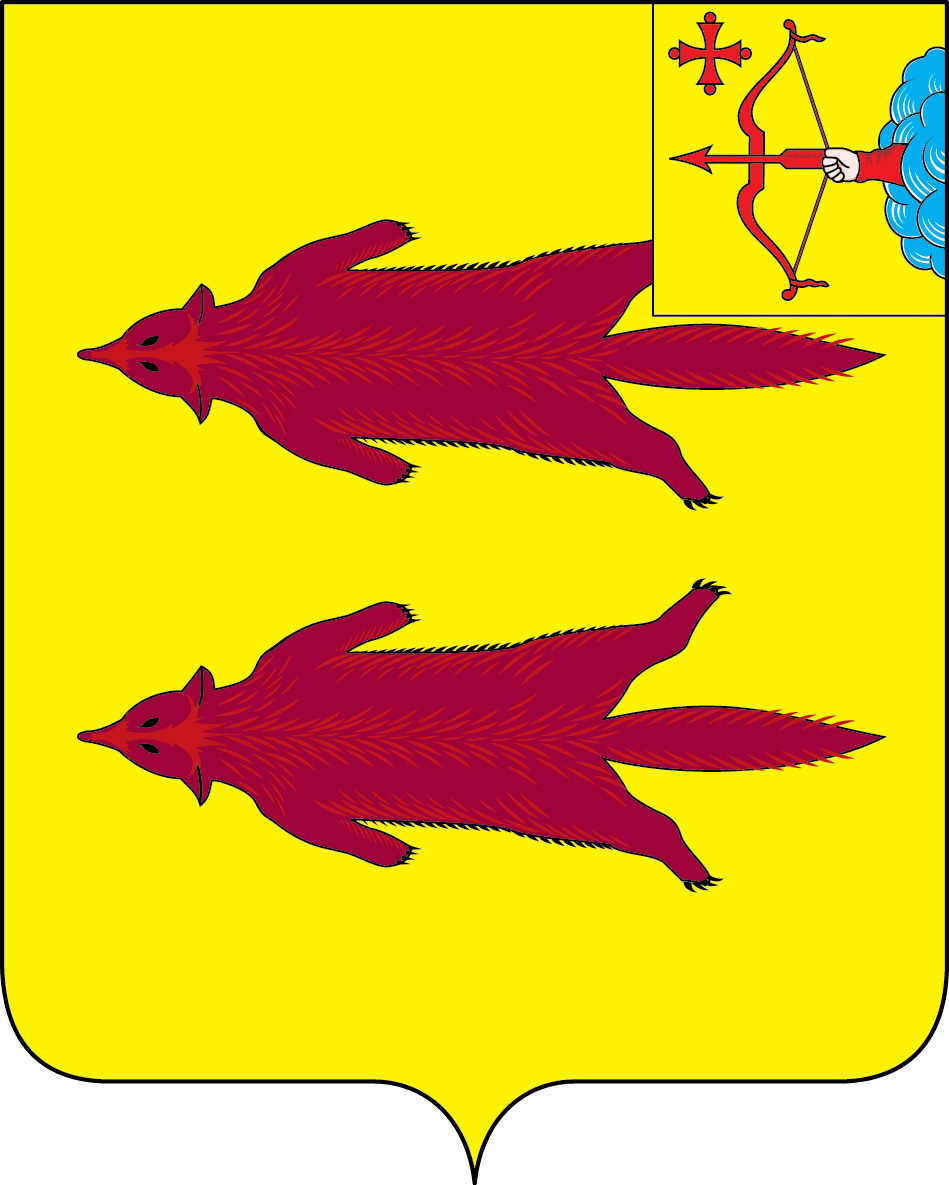
Lalsk

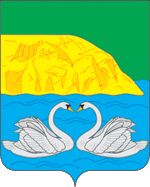
Lebyazhye

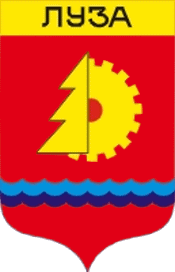
Luza

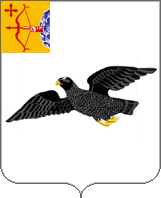
Malmyzh

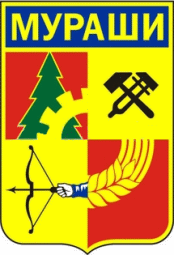
Murashi

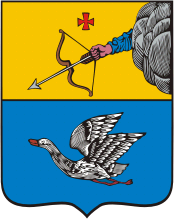
Nolinsk

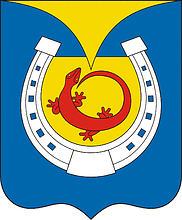
Omutninsk

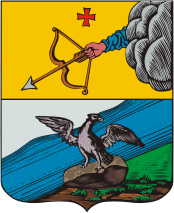
Orlov

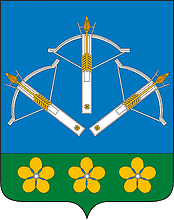
Pervomaysky

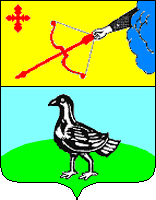
Sanchursk

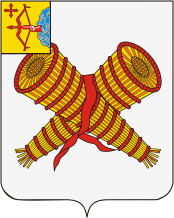
Slobodskoy

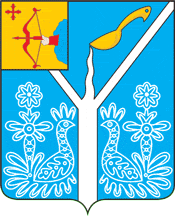
Sovetsk

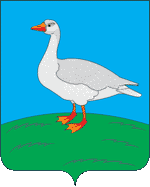
Urzhum

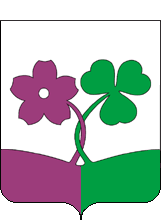
Verkhoshizhemye

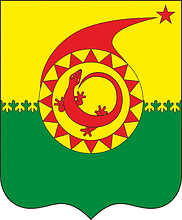
Vostochny

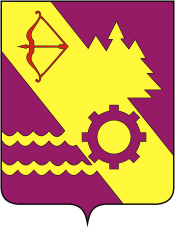
Vyatskiye Polyany

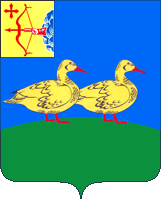
Yaransk

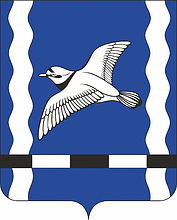
Zuyevka

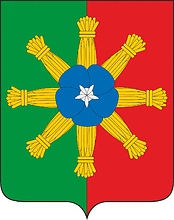
Arbazhsky District

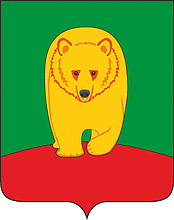
Afanasyevsky District

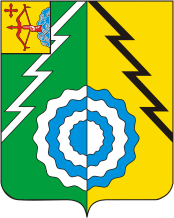
Belokholunitsky District

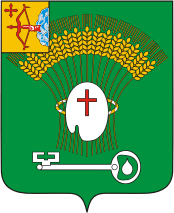
Bogorodsky District

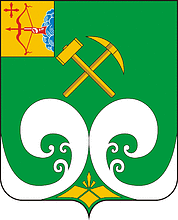
Verkhnekamsky District

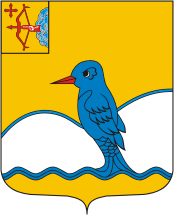
Verkhoshizhemsky District

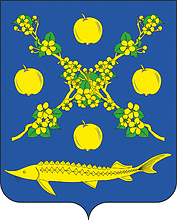
Vyatskopolyansky District

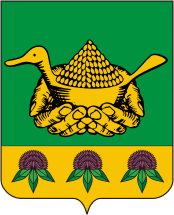
Darovskoy District

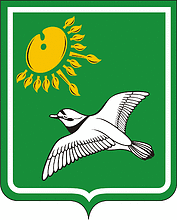
Zuyevsky District

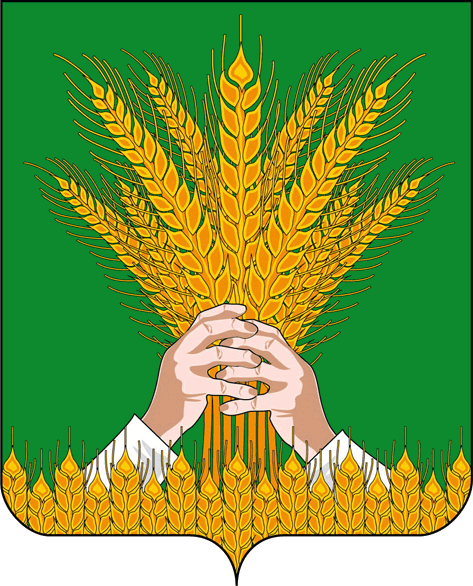
Kiknursky District

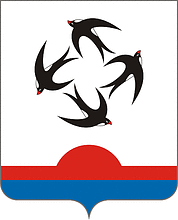
Kilmezsky District

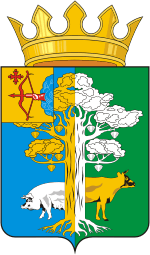
Kirovo-Chepetsky District

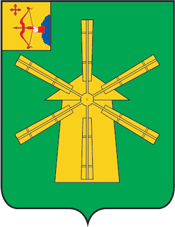
Kotelnichsky District

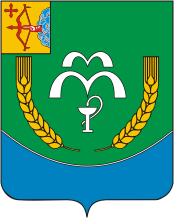
Kumyonsky District

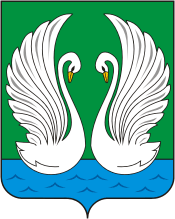
Lebyazhsky District

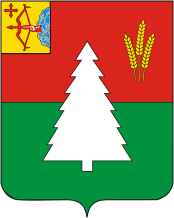
Luzsky District

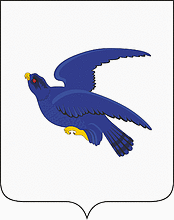
Malmyzhsky District

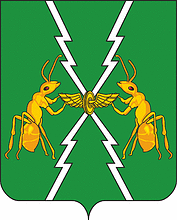
Murashinsky District

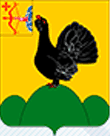
Nagorsky District

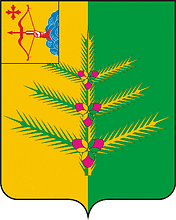
Nemsky District

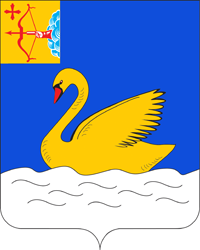
Nolinsky District

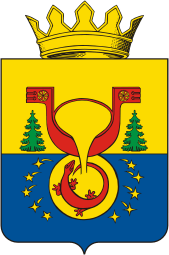
Omutninsky District

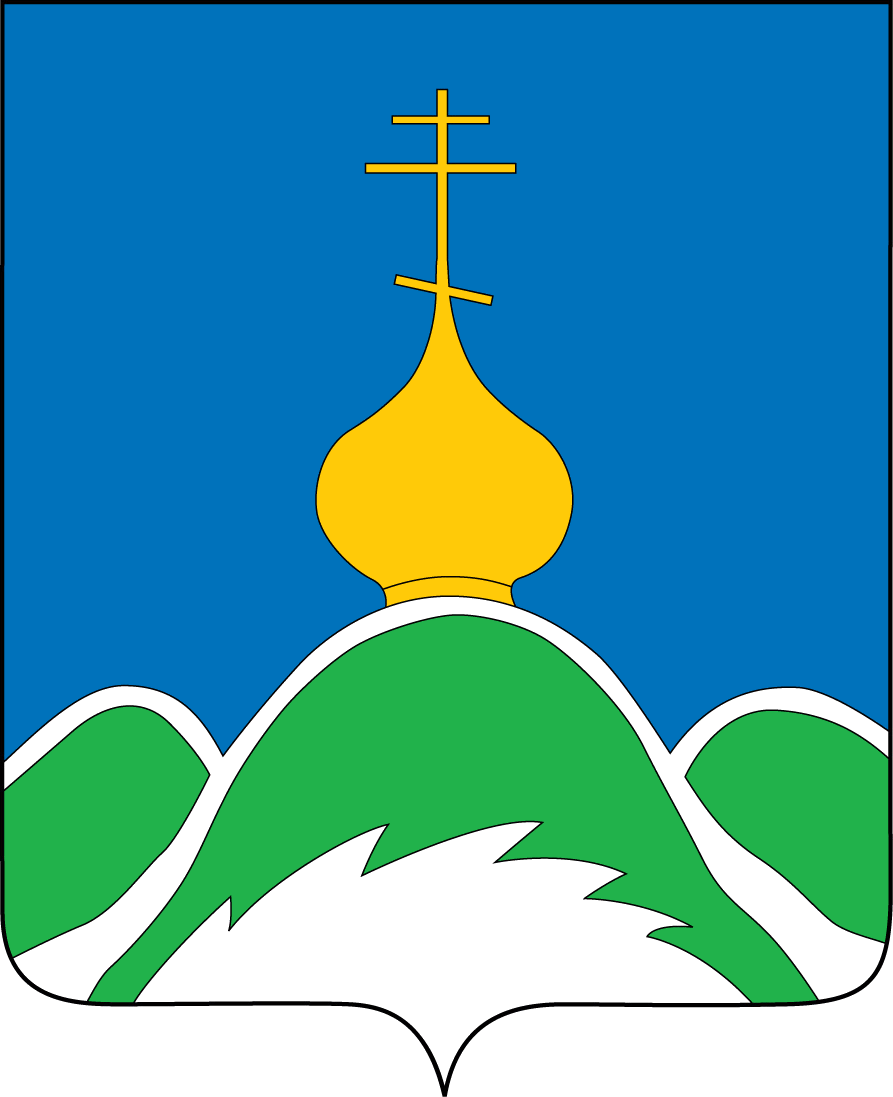
Oparinsky District

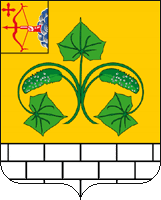
Orichevsky District

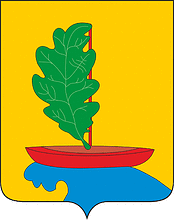
Pizhansky District

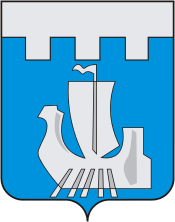
Podosinovsky District

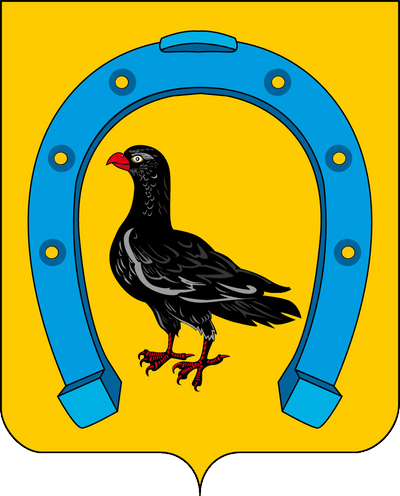
Sanchursky District

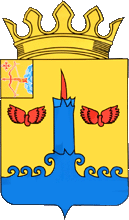
Svechinsky District

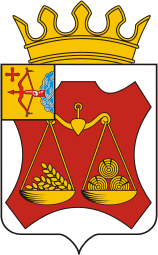
Slobodskoy District

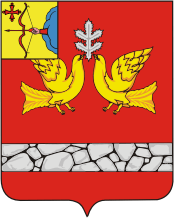
Sovetsky District

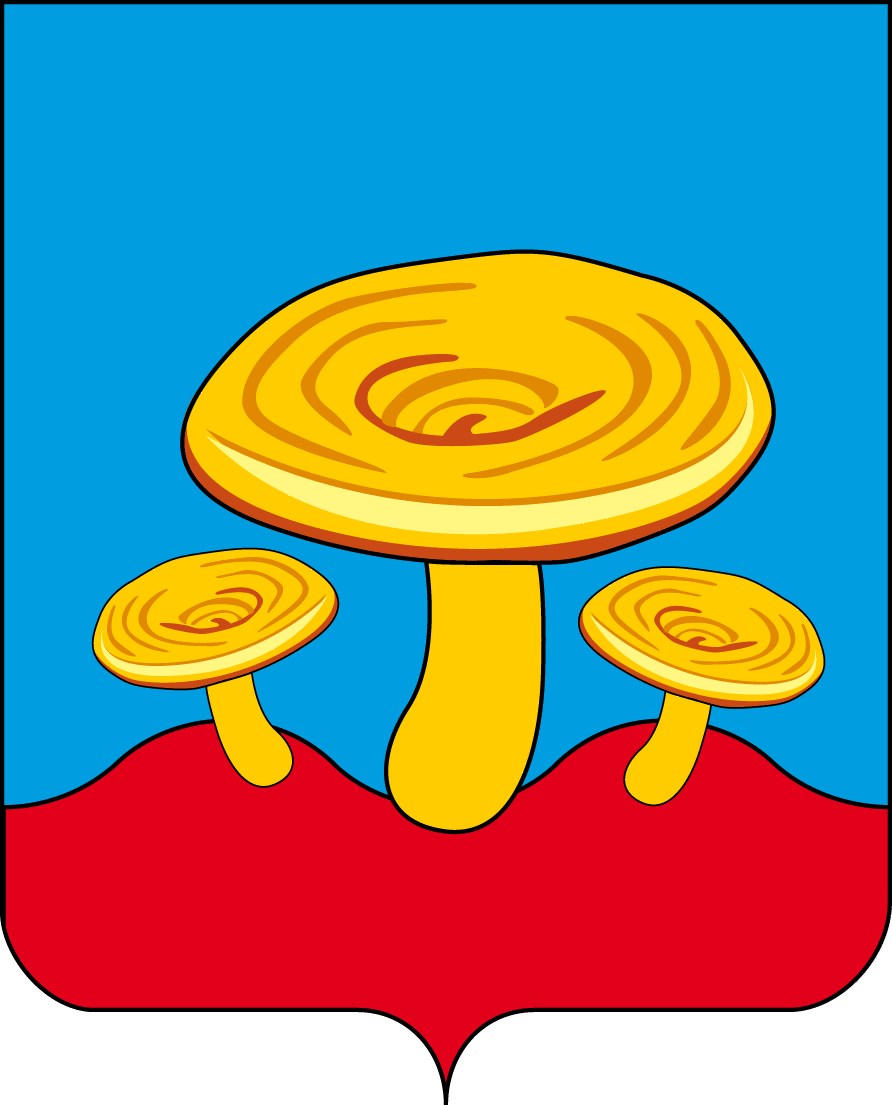
Sunsky District

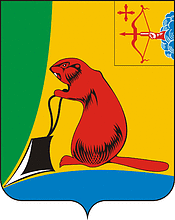
Tuzhinsky District

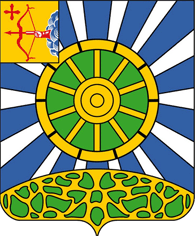
Uninsky District

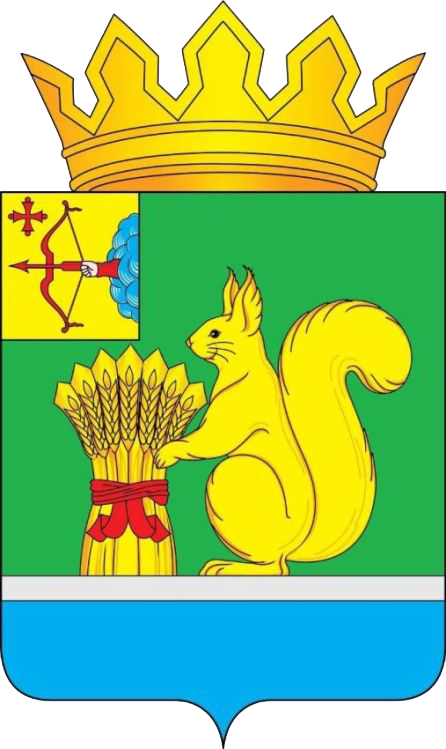
Urzhumsky District

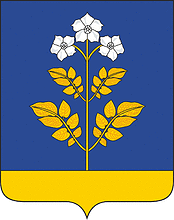
Falyonsky District

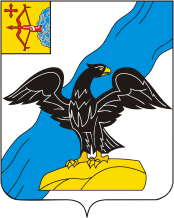
Orlovsky District

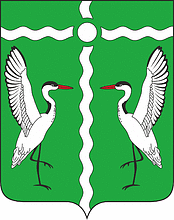
Shabalinsky District

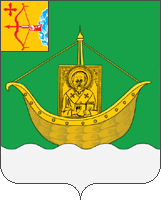
Yuryansky District

== Kostroma Oblast ==
Kostroma

Buy

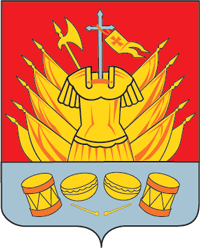
Galich

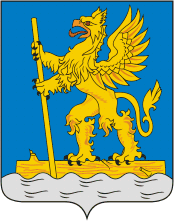
Manturovo

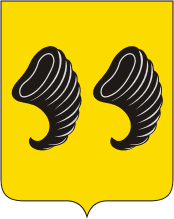
Nerekhta

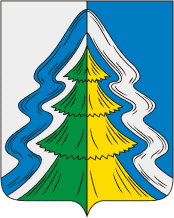
Neya

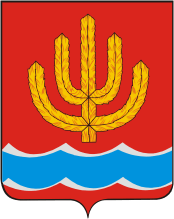
Sharya

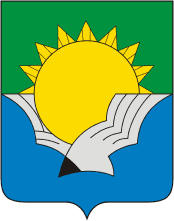
Volgorechensk

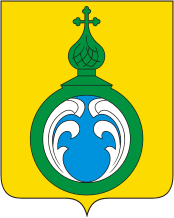
Antropovsky District

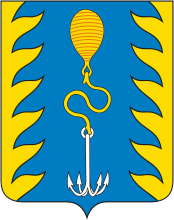
Buysky District

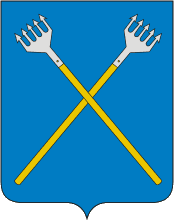
Chukhlomsky District

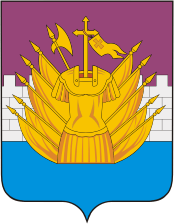
Galichsky District

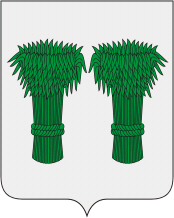
Kadyysky District

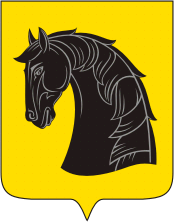
Kologrivsky District

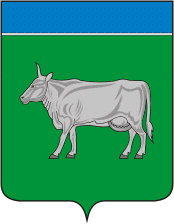
Kostromskoy District

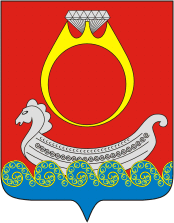
Krasnoselsky District

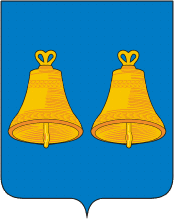
Makaryevsky District

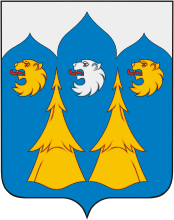
Manturovsky District

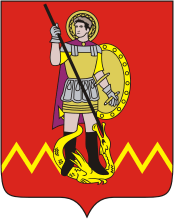
Mezhevskoy District

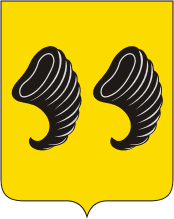
Nerekhtsky District

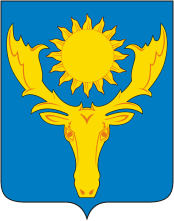
Oktyabrsky District

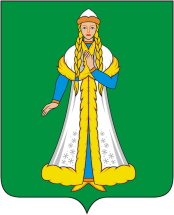
Ostrovsky District

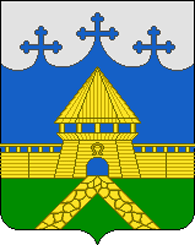
Parfenyevsky District

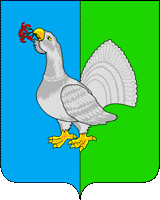
Pavinsky District

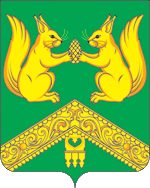
Ponazyrevsky District

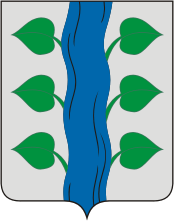
Pyshchugsky District

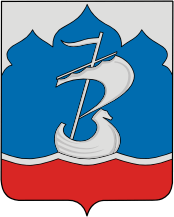
Sharyinsky District

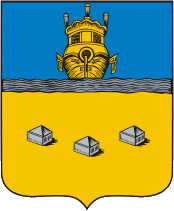
Soligalichsky District

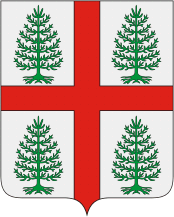
Sudislavsky District

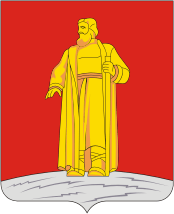
Susaninsky District

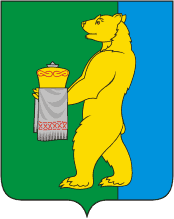
Vokhomsky District

== Kurgan Oblast ==
Kurgan

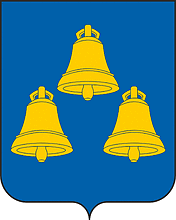
Dalmatovo

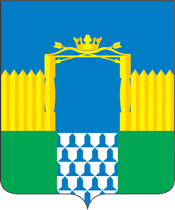
Kataysk

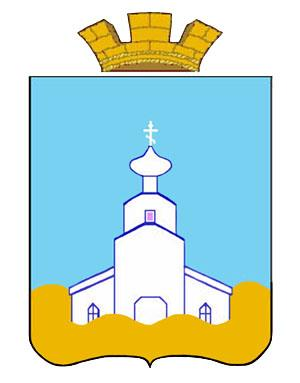
Kurtamysh

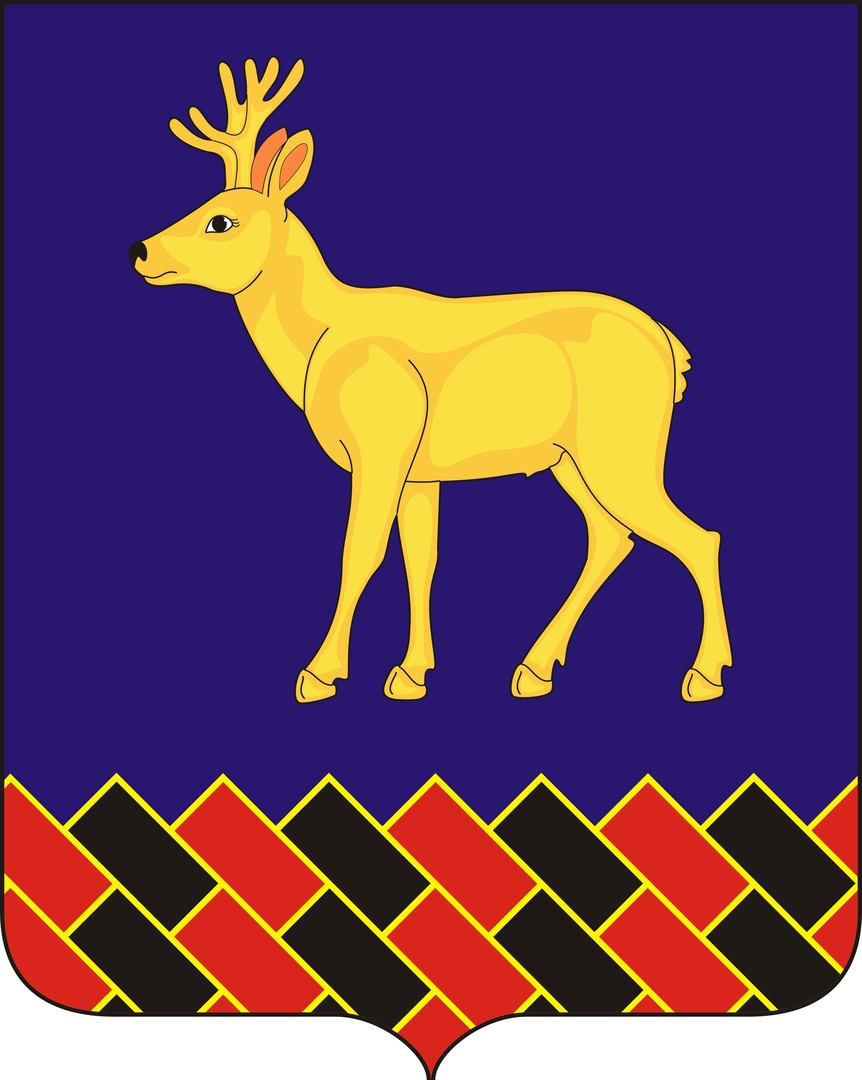
Mishkino

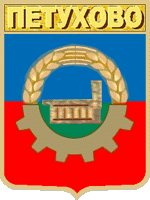
Petukhovo

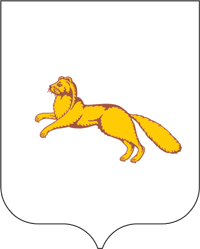
Shadrinsk

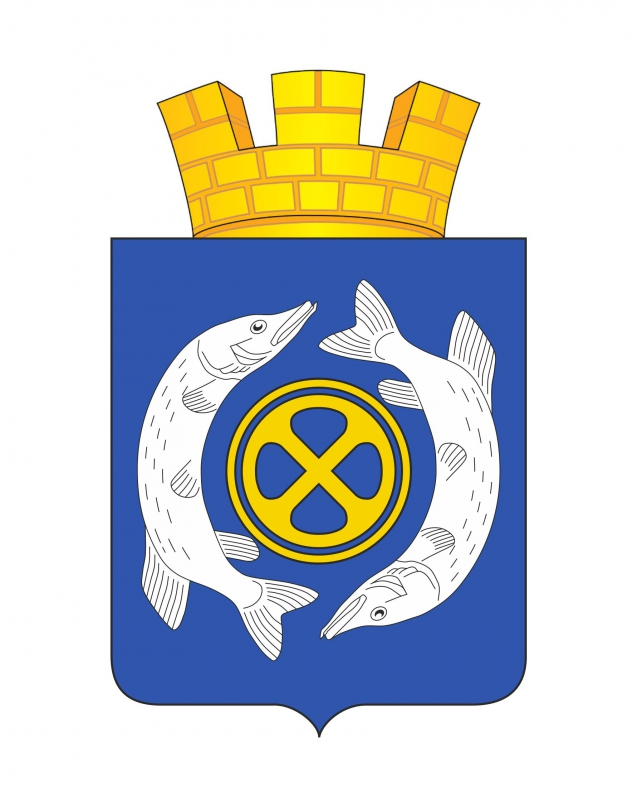
Shchuchye

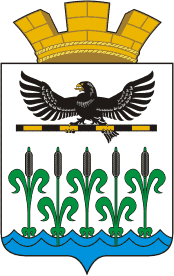
Shumikha

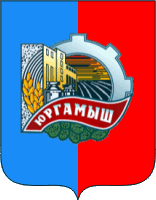
Yurgamysh

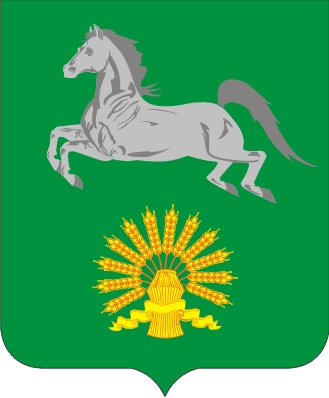
Almenevsky District

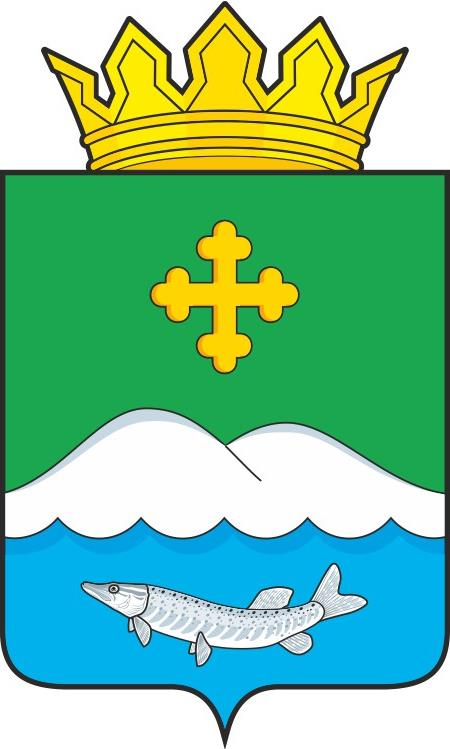
Belozersky District

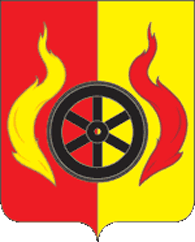
Vargashinsky District

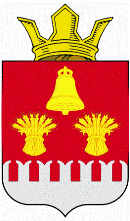
Dalmatovsky District

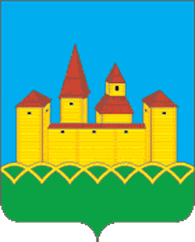
Zverinogolovsky District

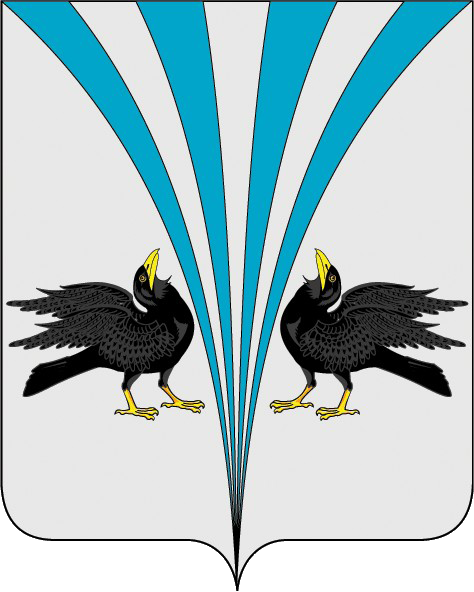
Kargapolsky District

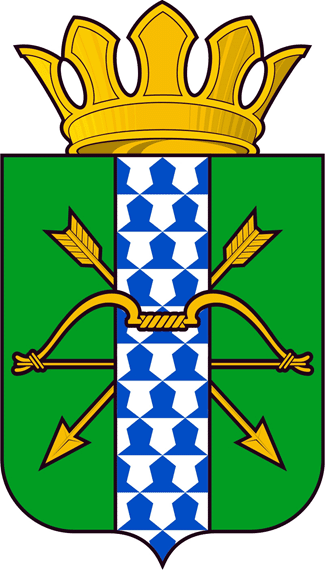
Kataysky District

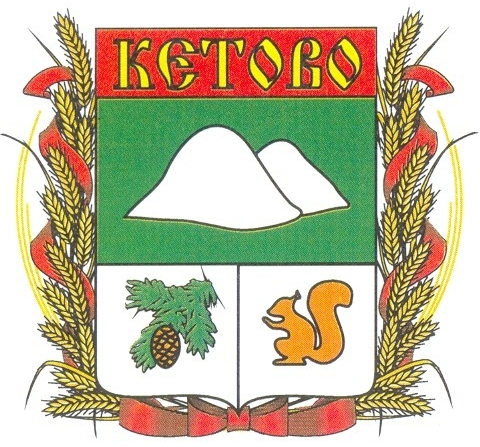
Ketovsky District

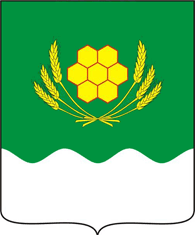
Kurtamyshsky District

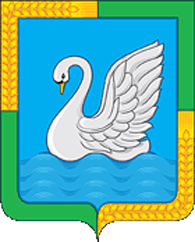
Lebyazhyevsky District

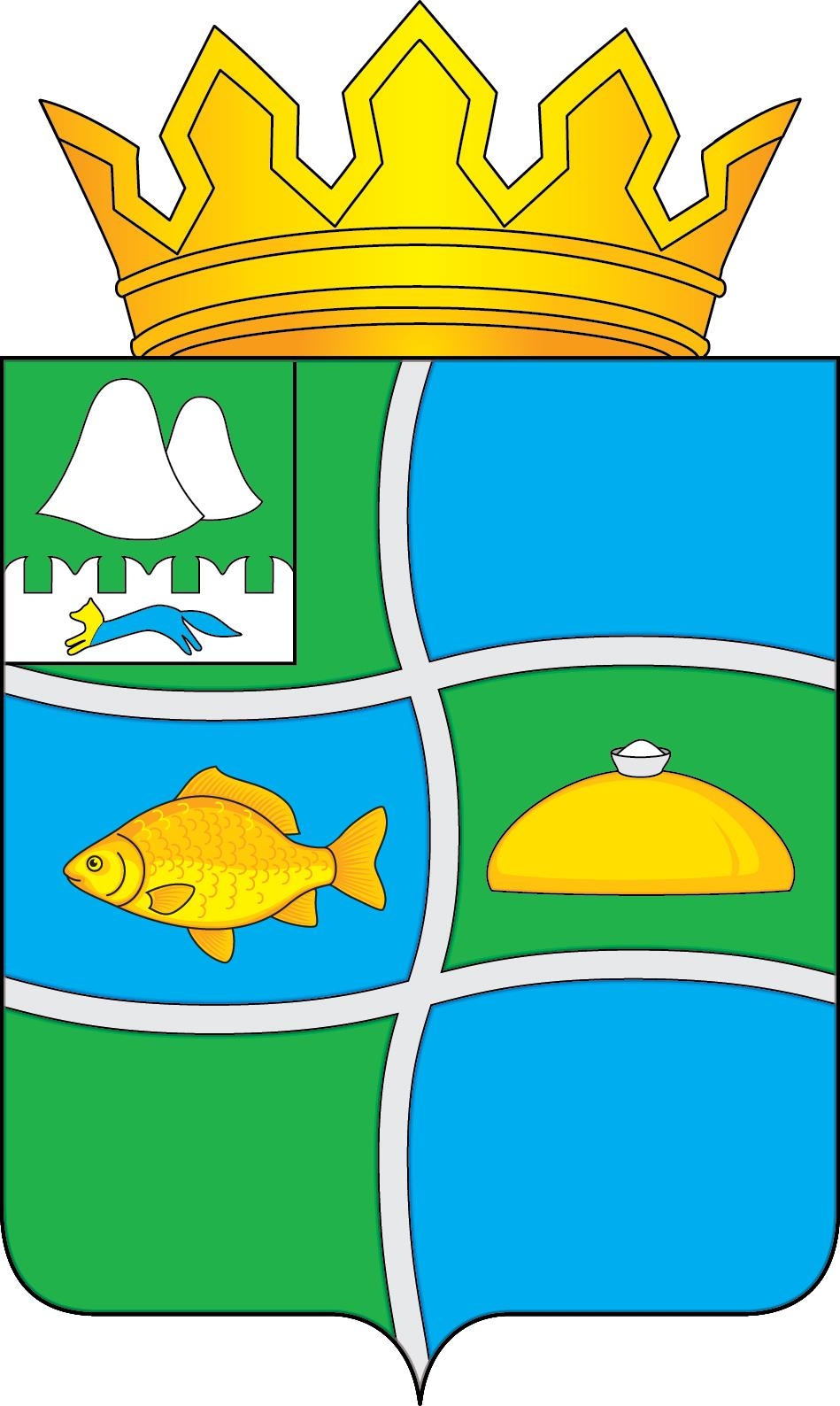
Makushinsky District

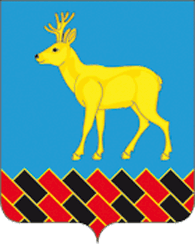
Mishkinsky District

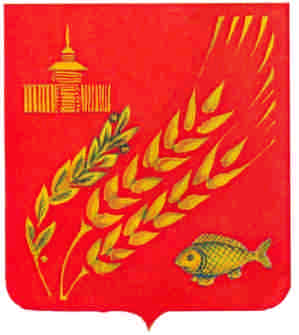
Mokrousovsky District

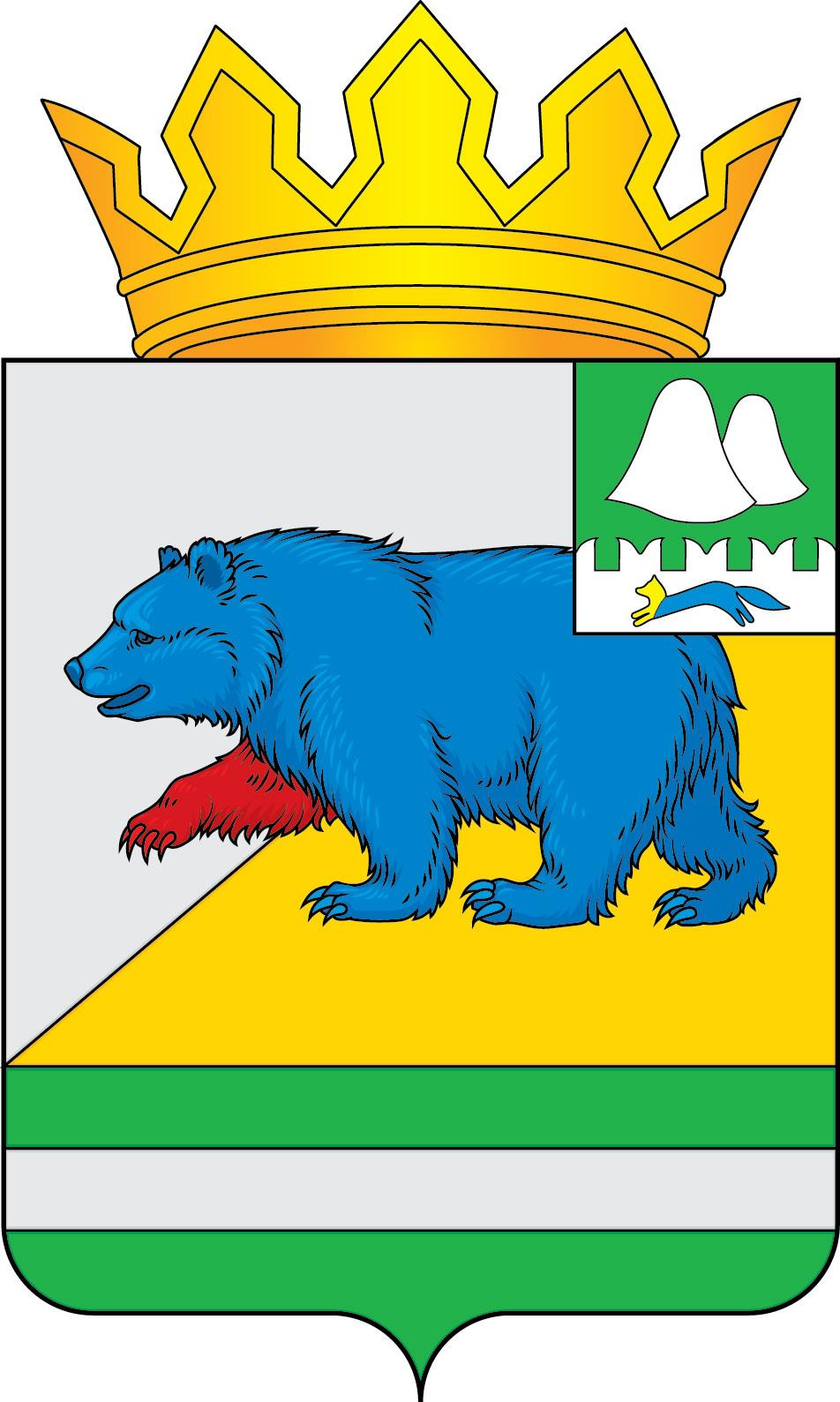
Petukhovsky District

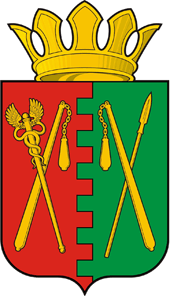
Polovinsky District

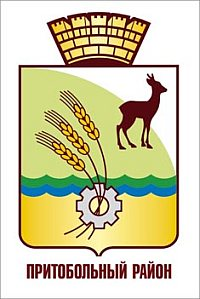
Pritobolny District

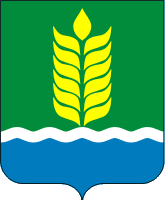
Safakulevsky District

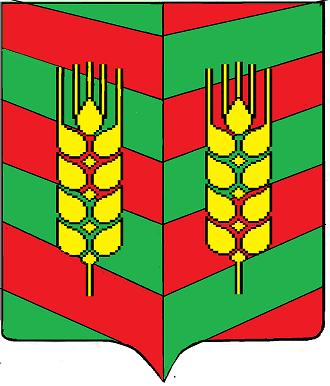
Tselinny District

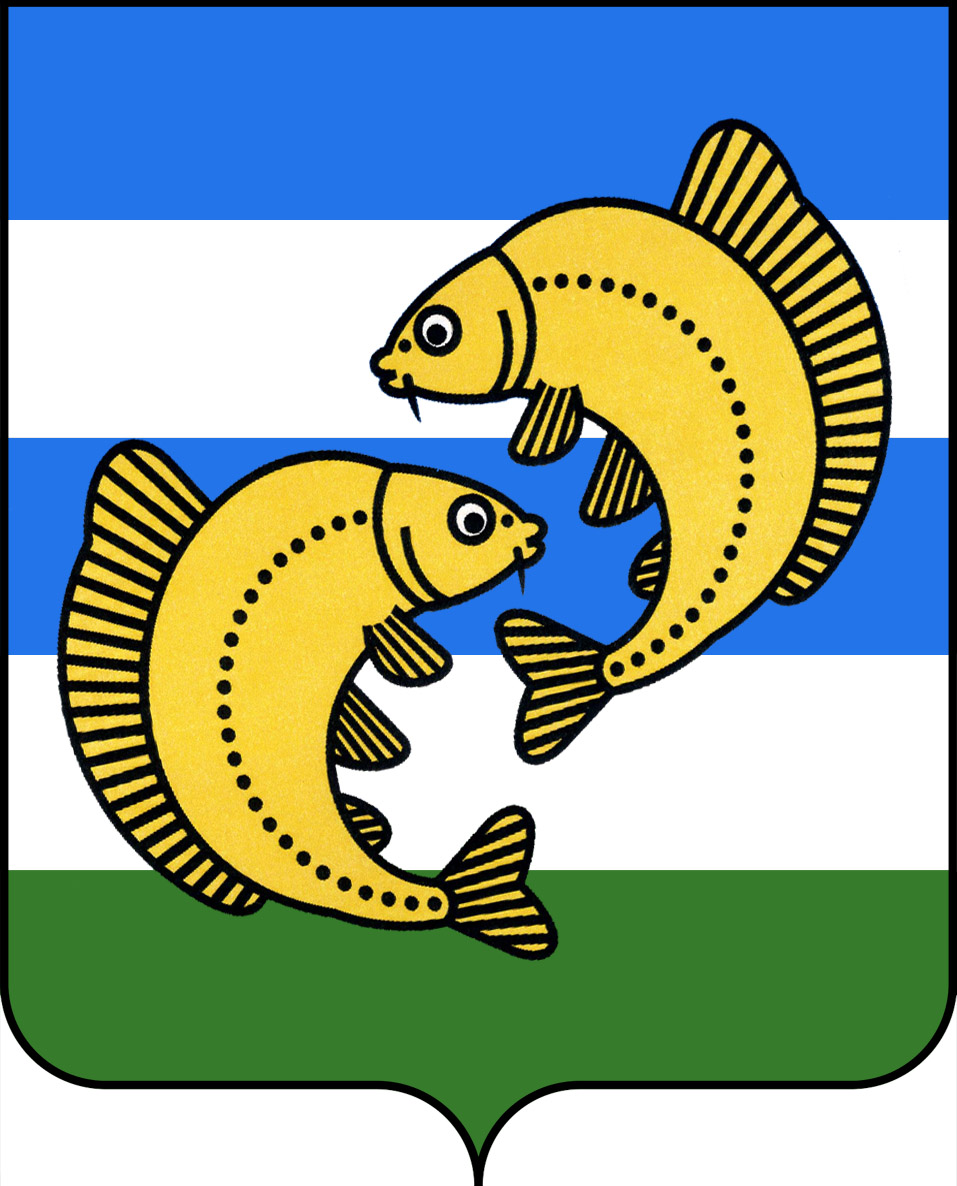
Chastoozersky District

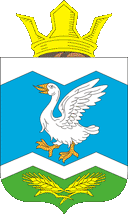
Shadrinsky District

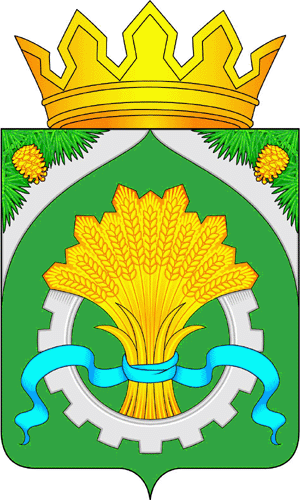
Shatrovsky District

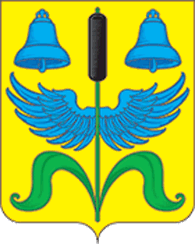
Shumikhinsky District

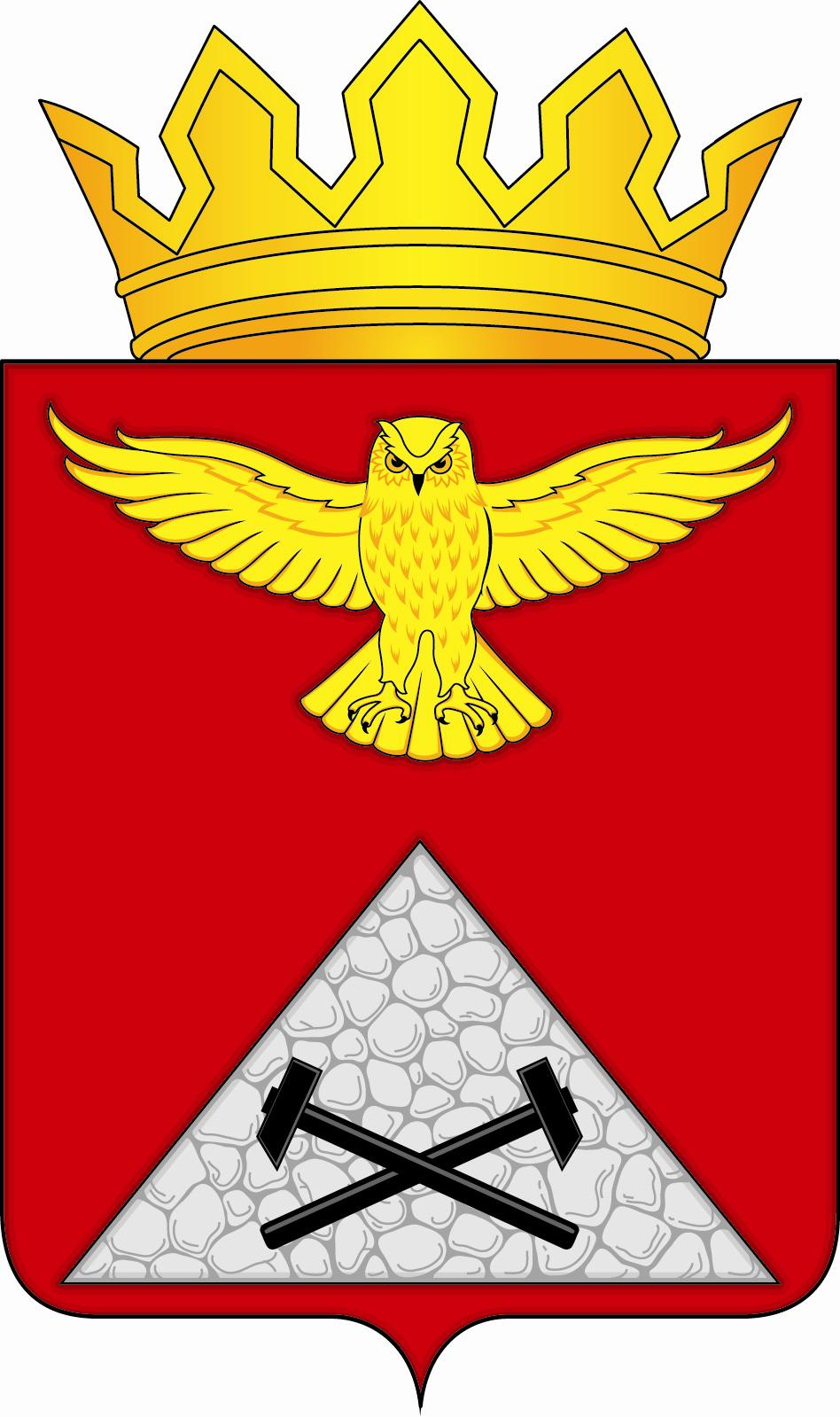
Yurgamyshsky District

== Kursk Oblast ==
Kursk

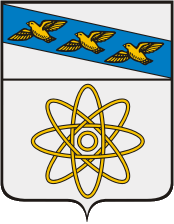
Kurchatov

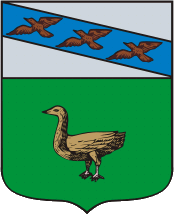
Lgov

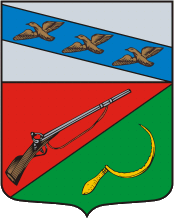
Shchigry

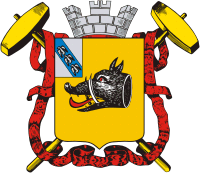
Rylsk

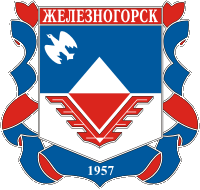
Zheleznogorsk

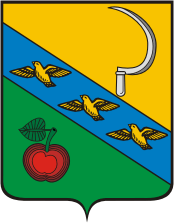
Belovsky District

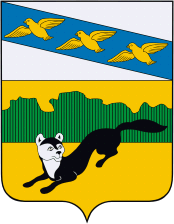
Bolshesoldatsky District

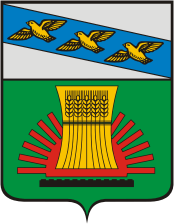
Cheremisinovsky District

Dmitriyevsky District

Fatezhsky District

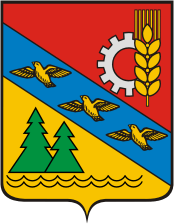
Glushkovsky District

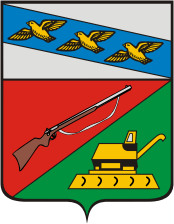
Gorshechensky District

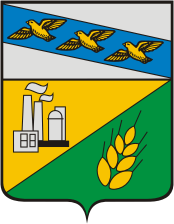
Kastorensky District

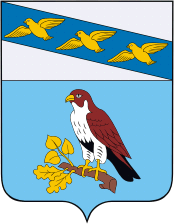
Khomutovsky District

Konyshyovsky District

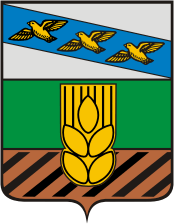
Korenevsky District

Kurchatovsky District

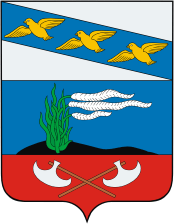
Kursky District

Lgovsky District

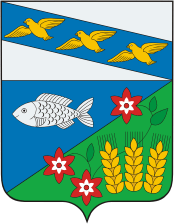
Manturovsky District

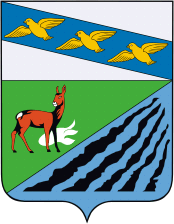
Medvensky District

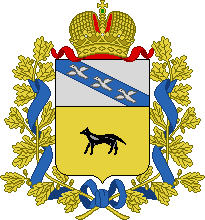
Oboyansky District

Oktyabrsky District

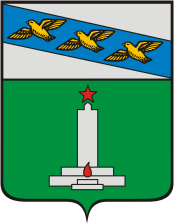
Ponyrovsky District

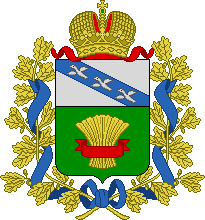
Pristensky District

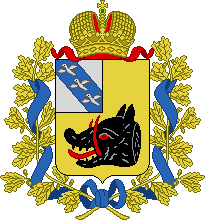
Rylsky District

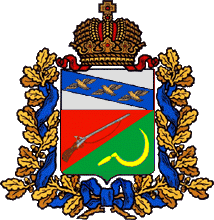
Shchigrovsky District

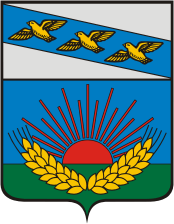
Solntsevsky District

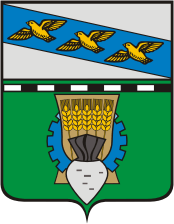
Sovetsky District

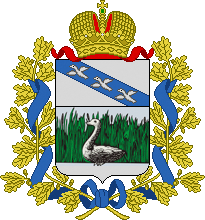
Sudzhansky District

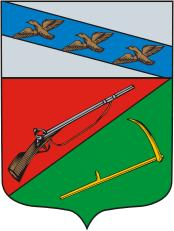
Timsky District

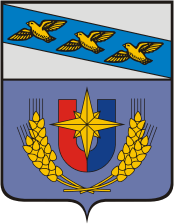
Zheleznogorsky District

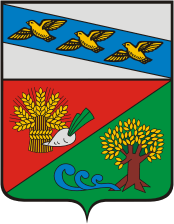
Zolotukhinsky District

== Lipetsk Oblast ==
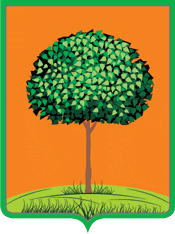
Lipetsk

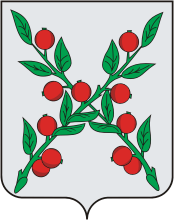
Chaplygin

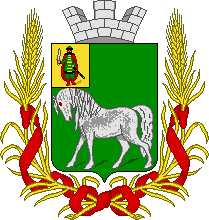
Dankov

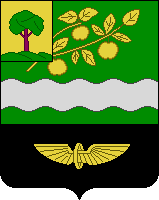
Gryazi

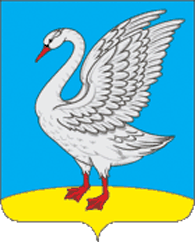
Lebedyan

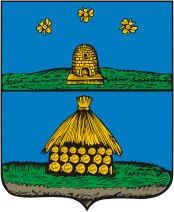
Usman

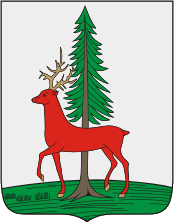
Yelets

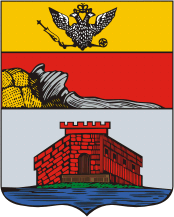
Zadonsk

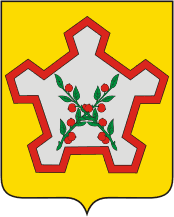
Chaplyginsky District

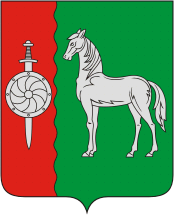
Dankovsky District

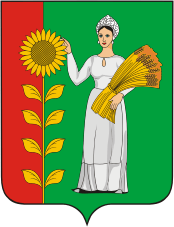
Dobrinsky District

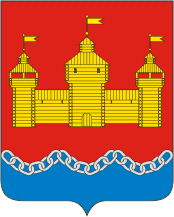
Dobrovsky District

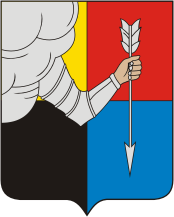
Dolgorukovsky District

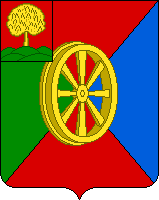
Gryazinsky District

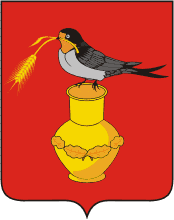
Izmalkovsky District

Khlevensky District

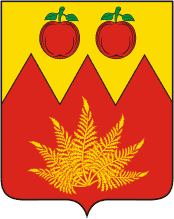
Krasninsky District

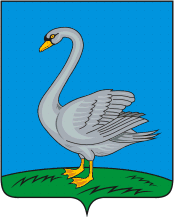
Lebedyansky District

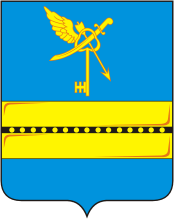
Lev-Tolstovsky District

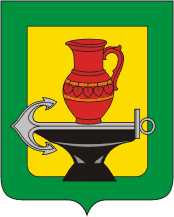
Lipetsky District

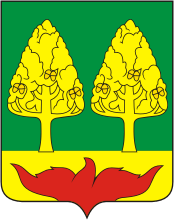
Stanovlyansky District

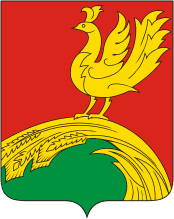
Terbunsky District

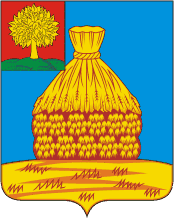
Usmansky District

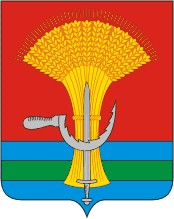
Volovsky District

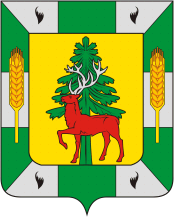
Yeletsky District

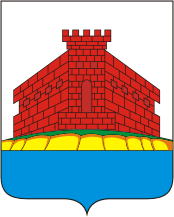
Zadonsky District

== Magadan Oblast ==
Magadan

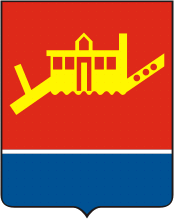
Susuman

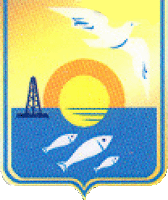
Olsky District

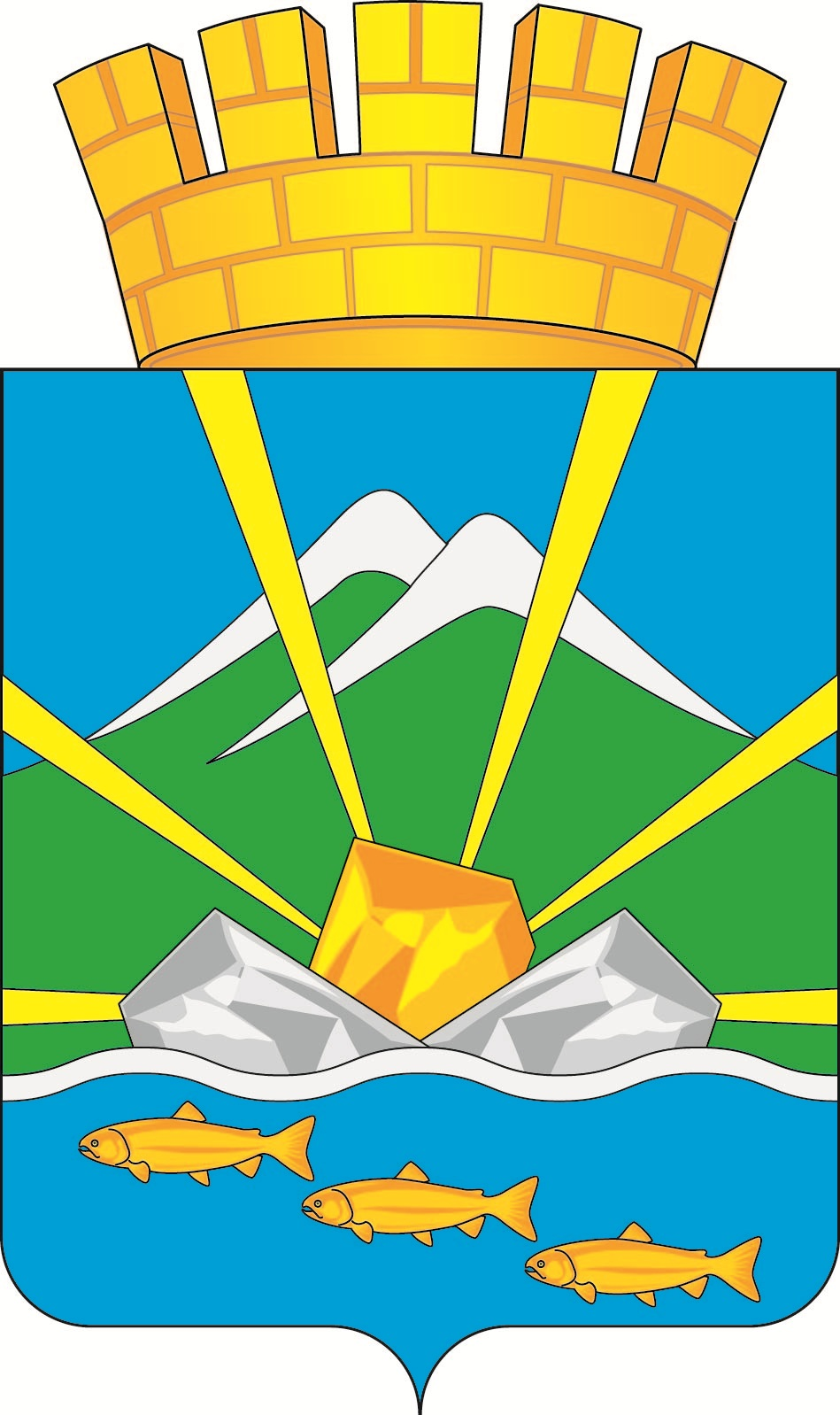
Omsukchansky District

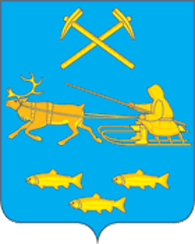
Severo-Evensky District

Srednekansky District

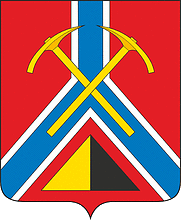
Susumansky District

== Murmansk oblast ==
Murmansk

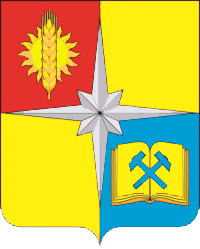
Apatity

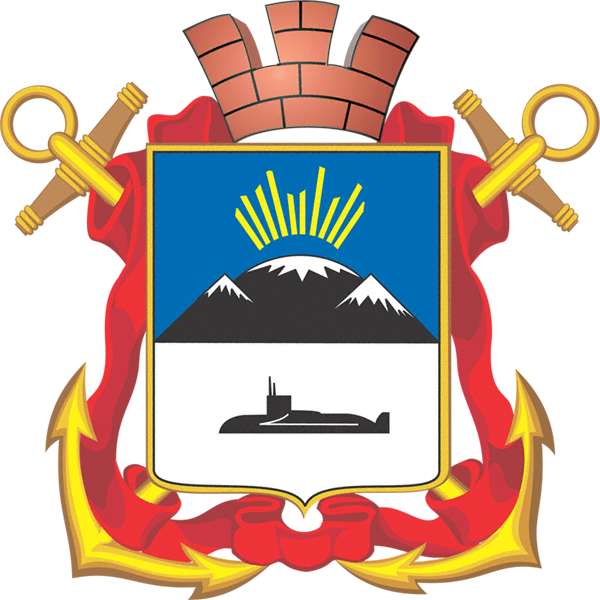
Gadzhiyevo

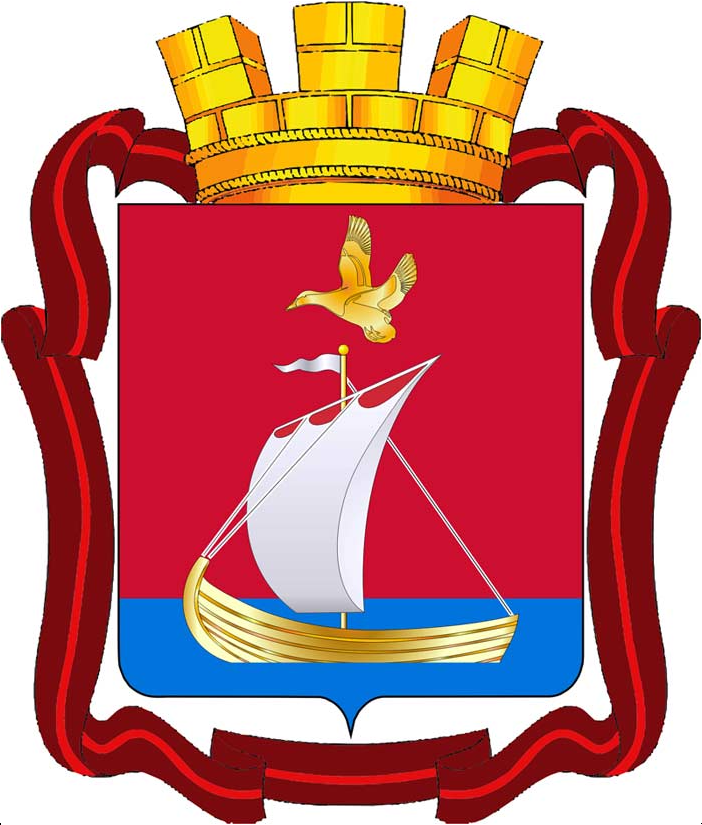
Kandalaksha

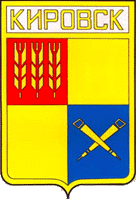
Kirovsk

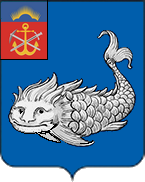
Kola

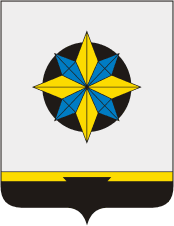
Kovdor

Murmashi

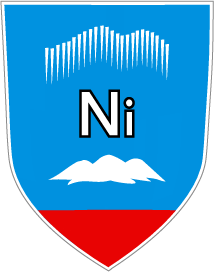
Nikel

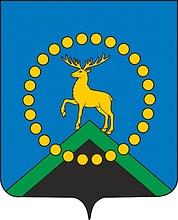
Olenegorsk

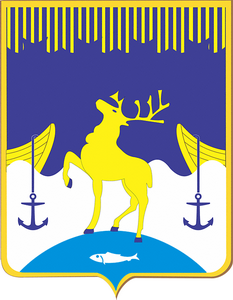
Ostrovnoy

Pechenga

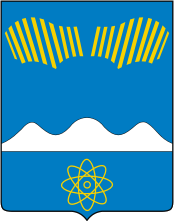
Polyarnye Zori

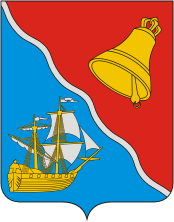
Polyarny

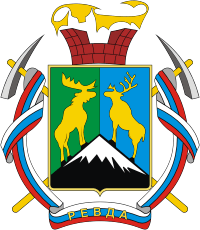
Revda

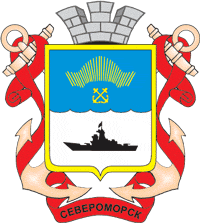
Severomorsk

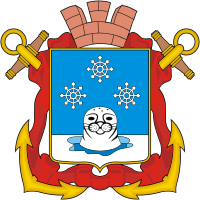
Snezhnogorsk

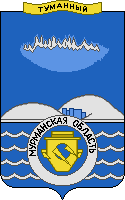
Tumanny

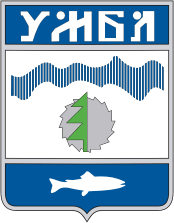
Umba

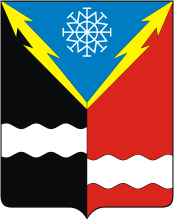
Verkhnetulomsky

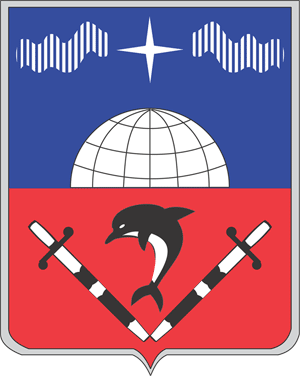
Vidyayevo

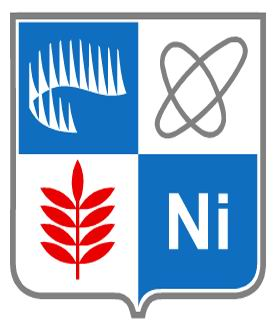
Zapolyarny

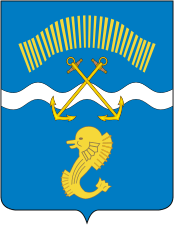
Zaozyorsk

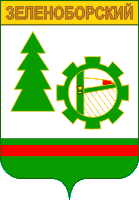
Zelenoborsky

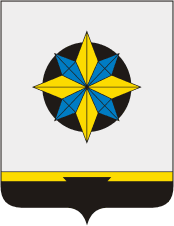
Kovdorsky District

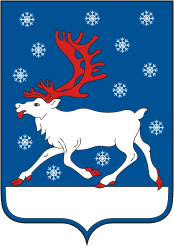
Kolsky District

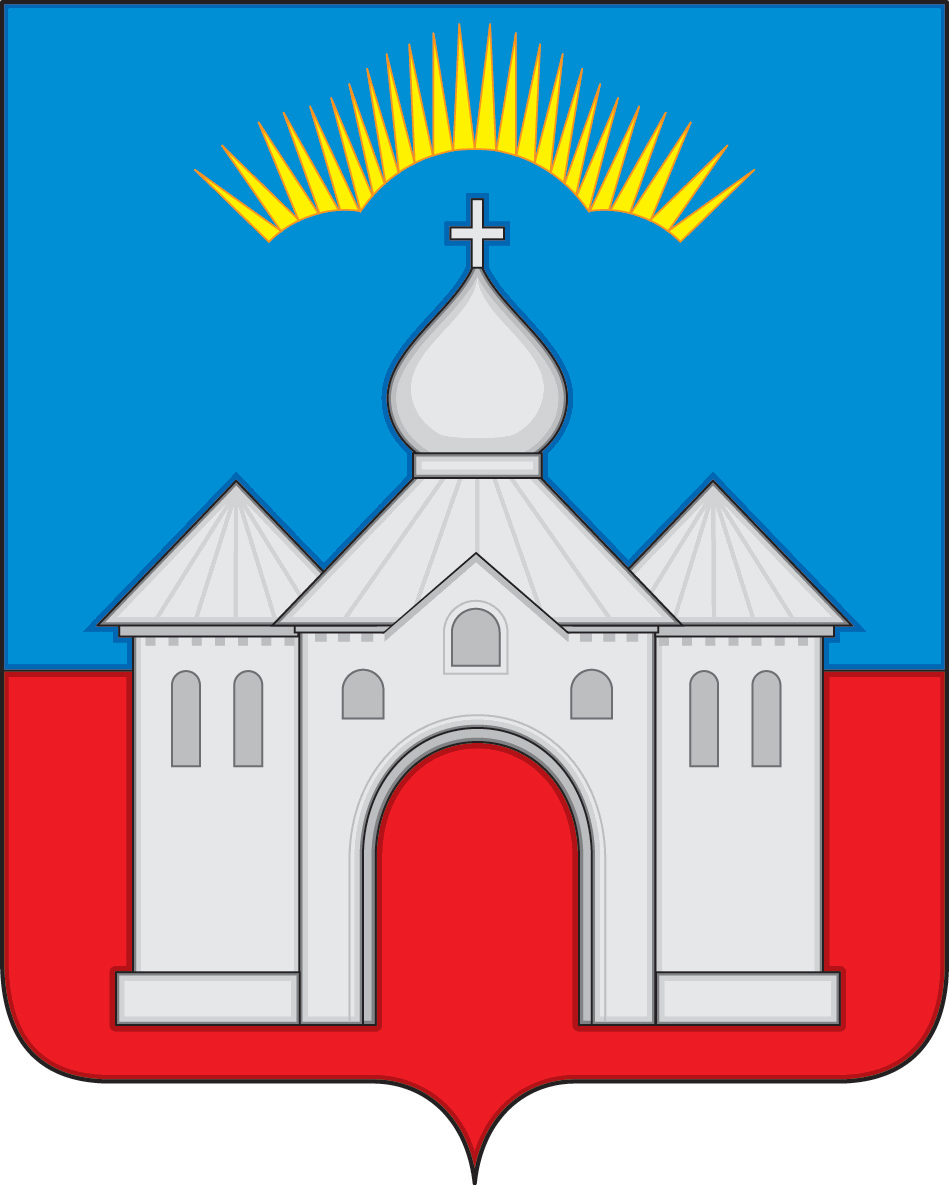
Kandalakshsky District

Lovozersky District

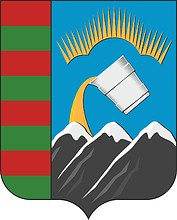
Pechengsky District

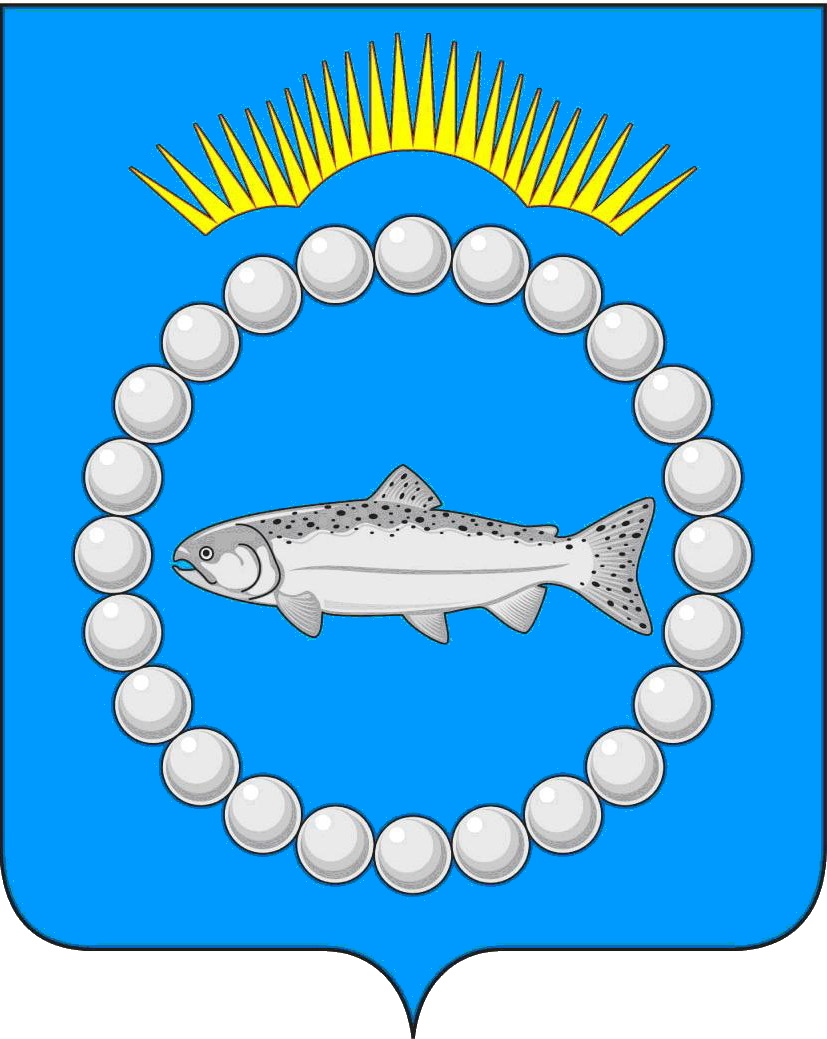
Tersky District

== Nizhny Novgorod oblast ==
Nizhny Novgorod

Ardatov

Arzamas

Balakhna

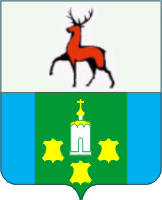
Bogorodsk

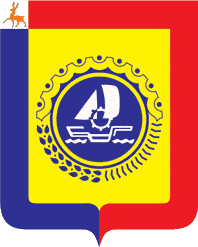
Bor

Dzerzhinsk

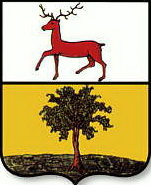
Gorbatov

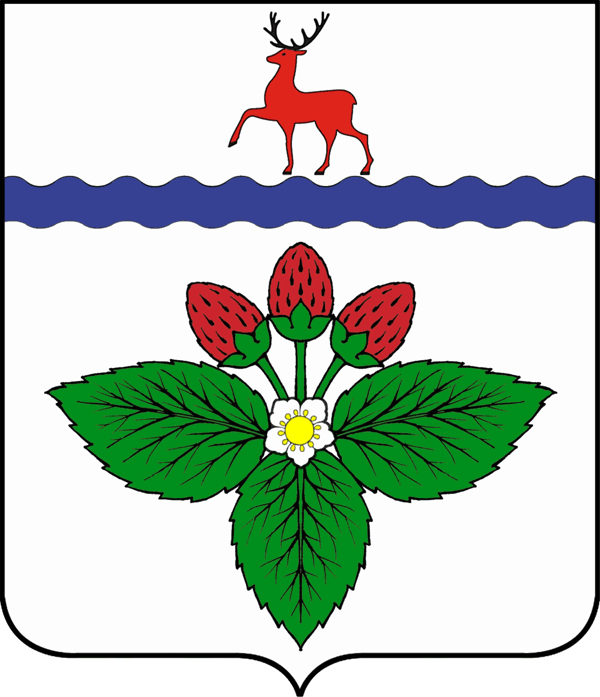
Kstovo

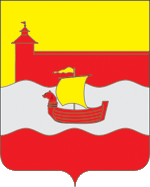
Lyskovo

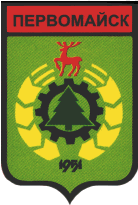
Pervomaysk

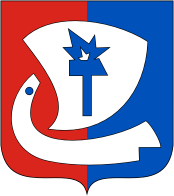
Pavlovo

Sarov

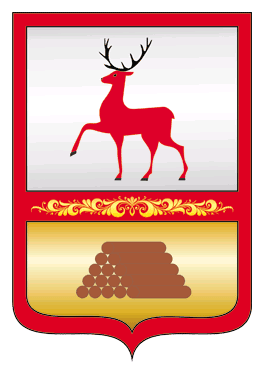
Semyonov

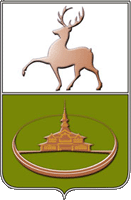
Kulebaki

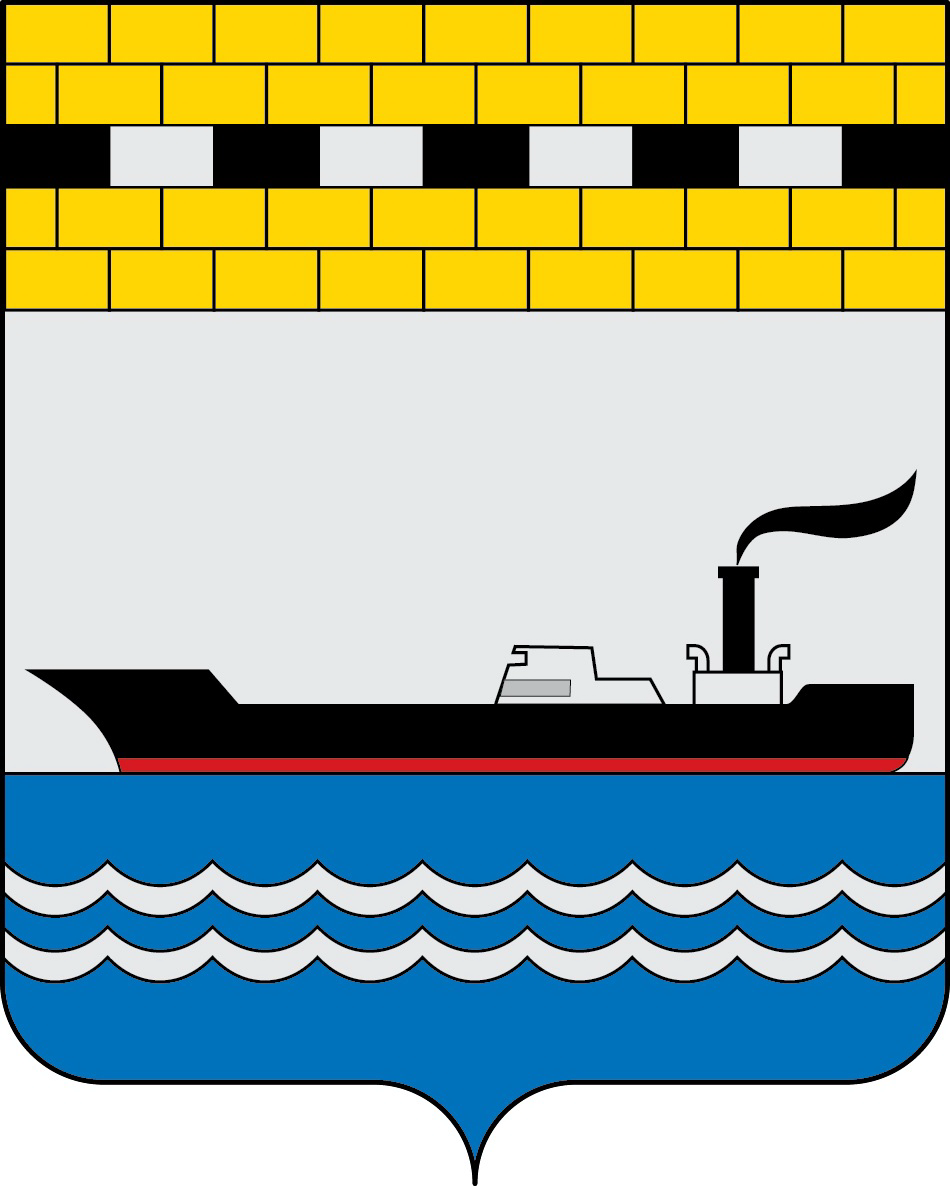
Navashino

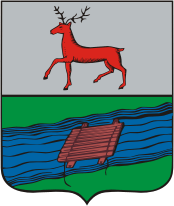
Perevoz

Chkalovsk

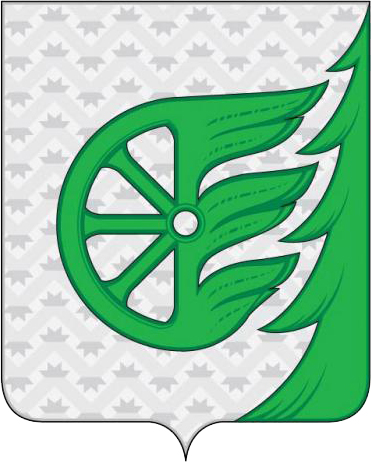
Shakhunya

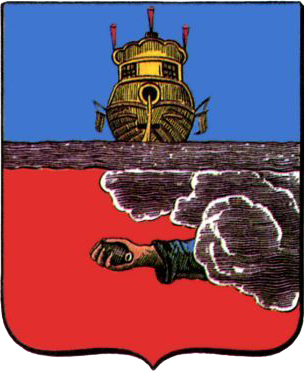
Varnavino

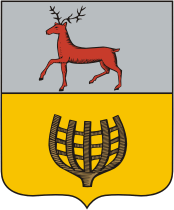
Vasilsursk

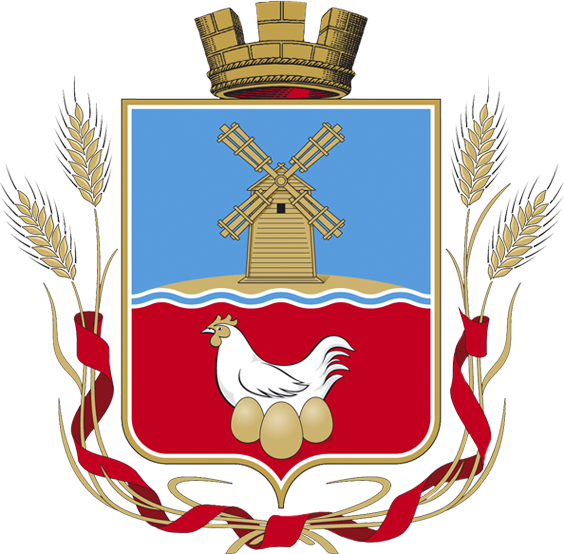
Volodarsk

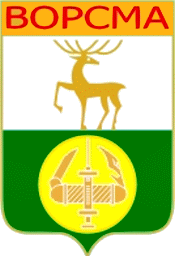
Vorsma

Vyksa

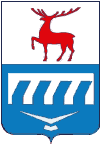
Zavolzhye

Ardatovsky District

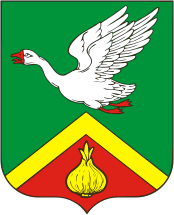
Arzamassky District

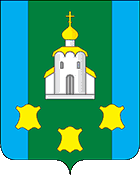
Bogorodsky District

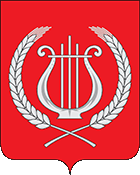
Bolsheboldinsky District

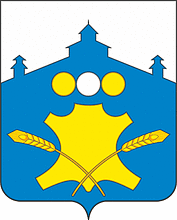
Bolshemurashkinsky District

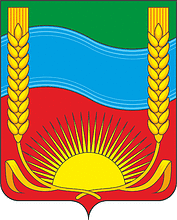
Buturlinsky District

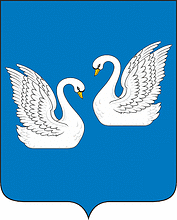
Vadsky District

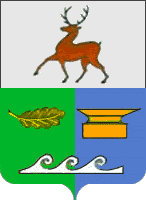
Vachsky District

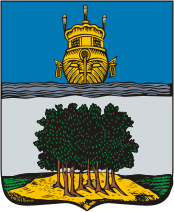
Vetluzhsky District

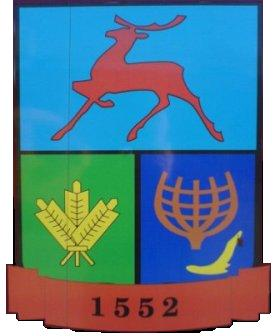
Vorotynsky District

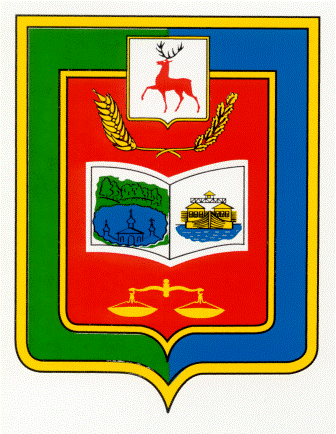
Voskresensky District

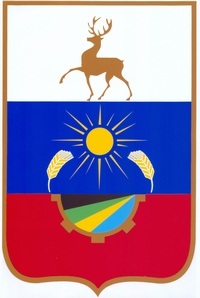
Gaginsky District

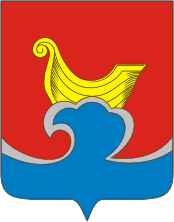
Gorodetsky District

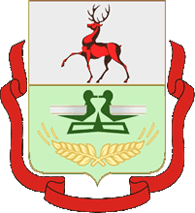
Dalnekonstantinovsky District

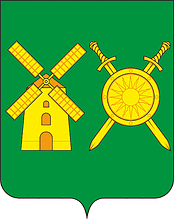
Volodarsky District

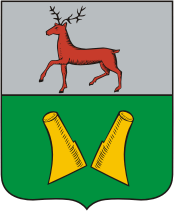
Knyagininsky District

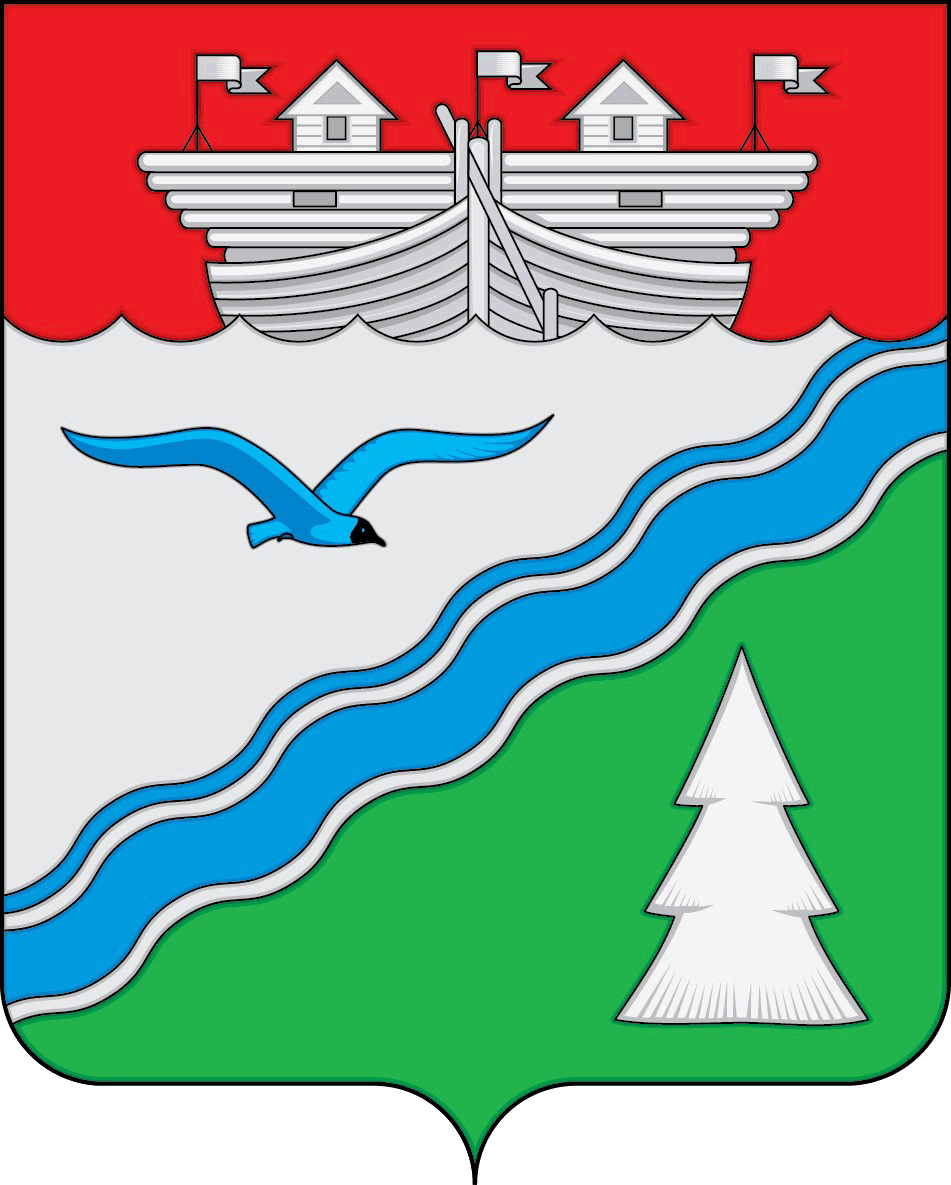
Krasnobakovsky District

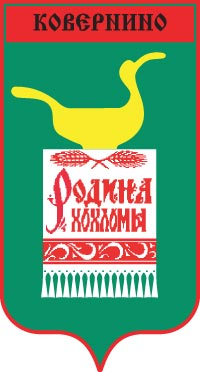
Koverninsky District

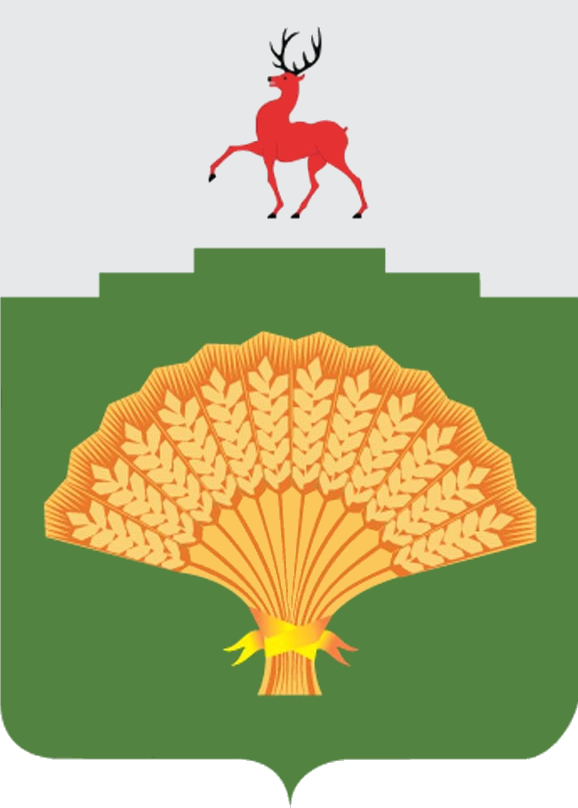
Krasnooktyabrsky District

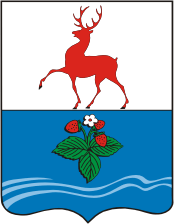
Kstovsky District

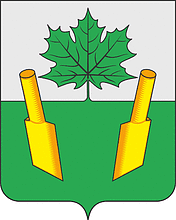
Lukoyanovsky District

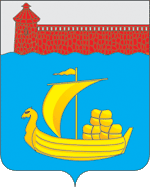
Lyskovsky District

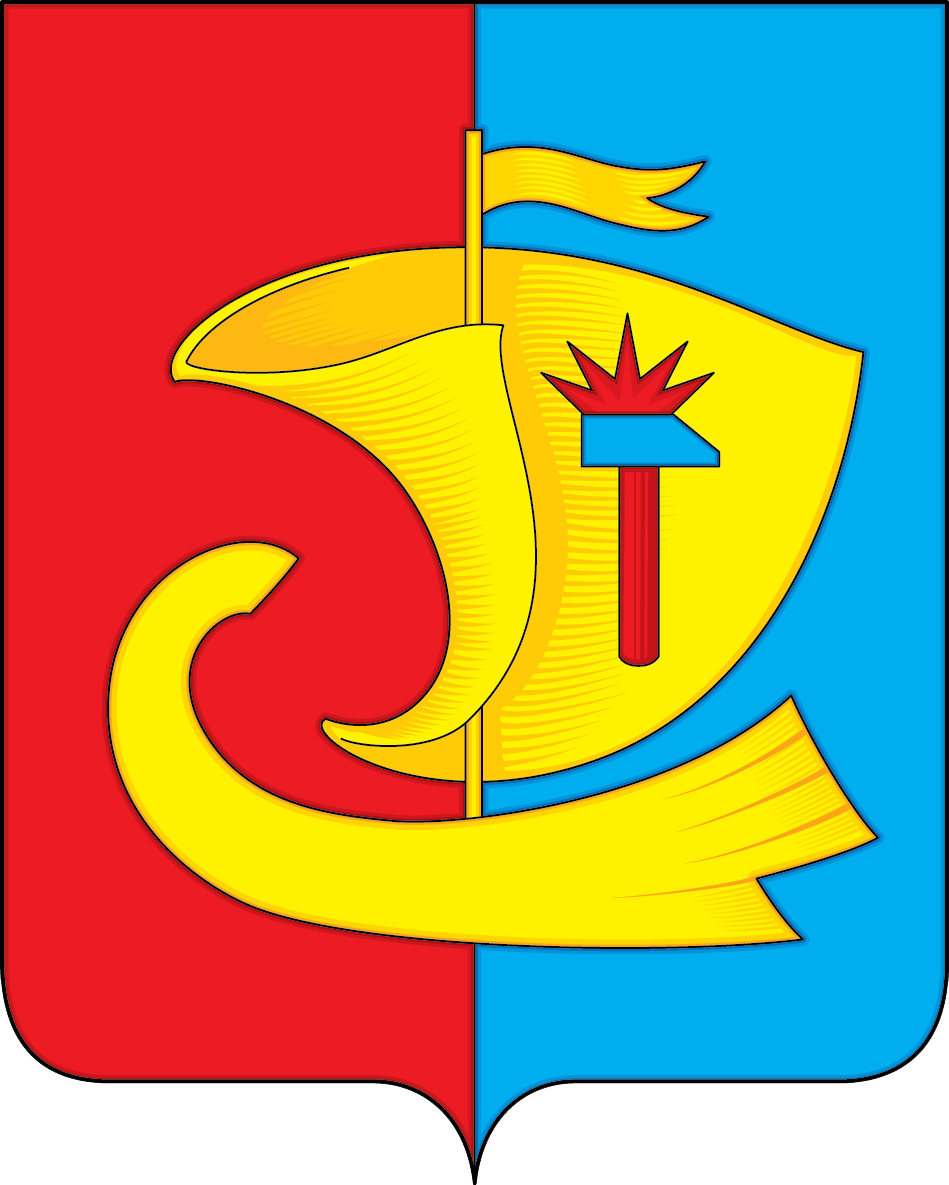
Pavlovsky District

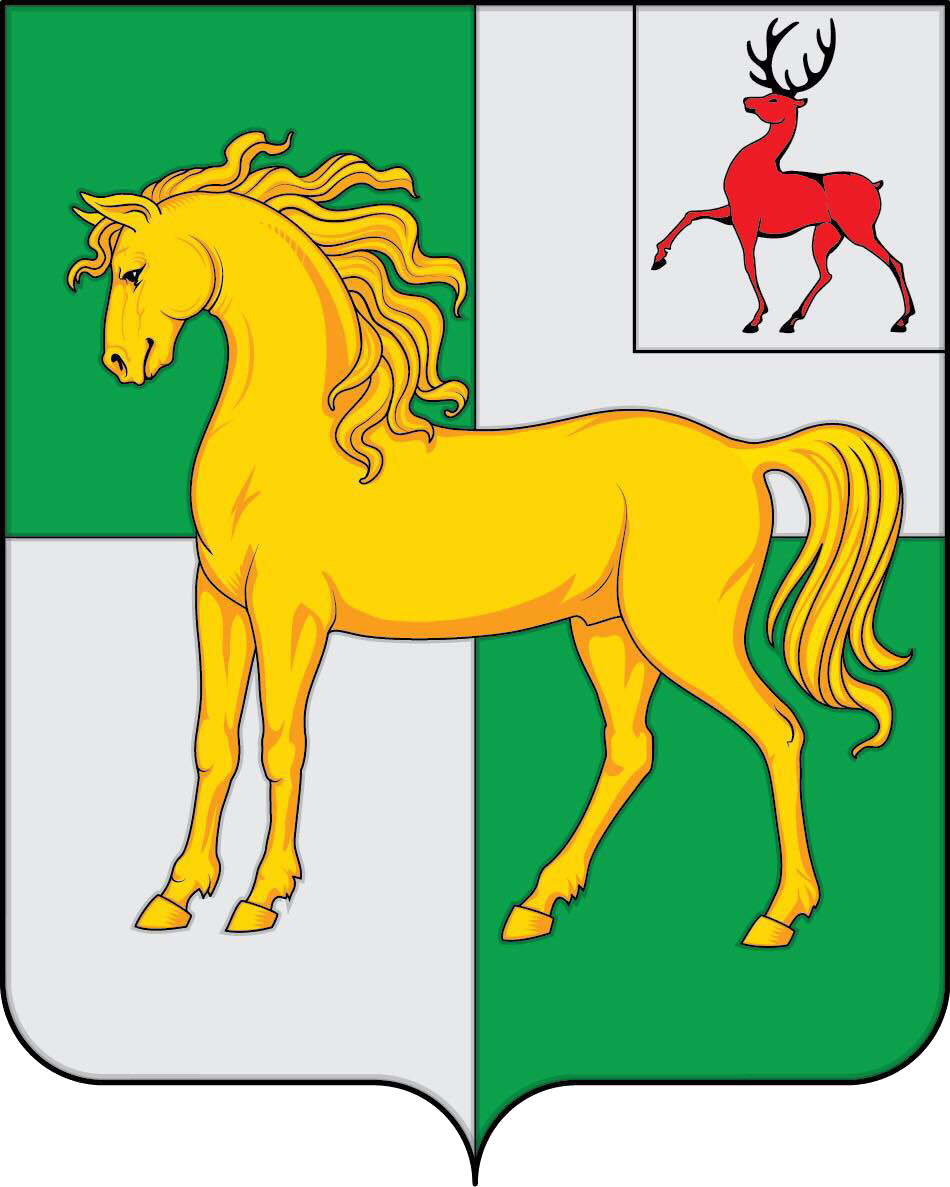
Pochinkovsky District

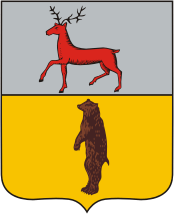
Sergachsky District

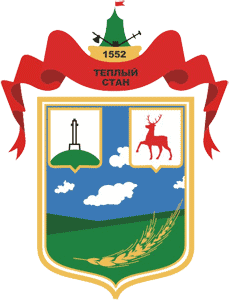
Sechenovsky District

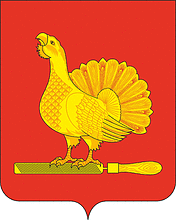
Sosnovsky District

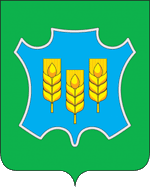
Spassky District

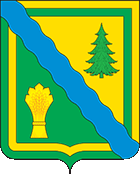
Tonkinsky District

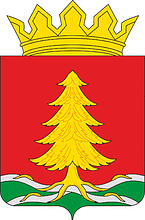
Tonshayevsky District

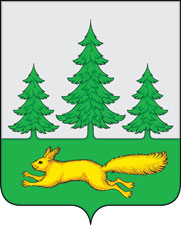
Urensky District

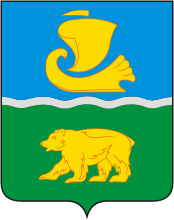
Sokolsky District

== Novgorod Oblast ==
Veliky Novgorod

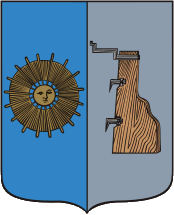
Borovichi

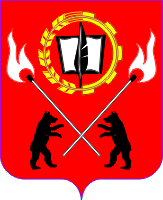
Chudovo

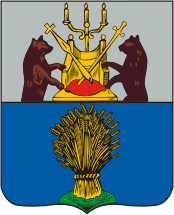
Demyansk

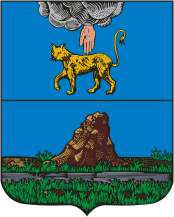
Kholm

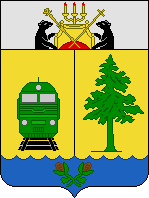
Khvoynaya

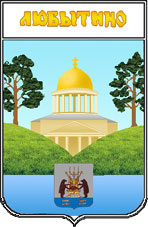
Lyubytino

Malaya Vishera

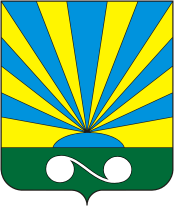
Okulovka

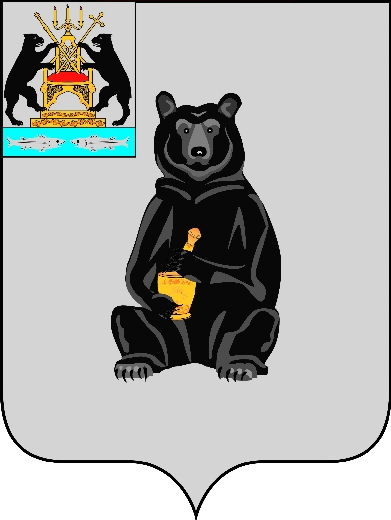
Pestovo

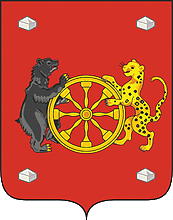
Soltsy

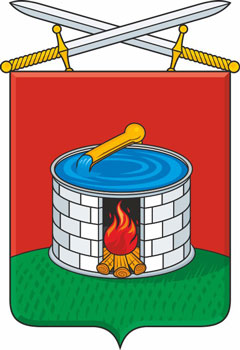
Staraya Russa

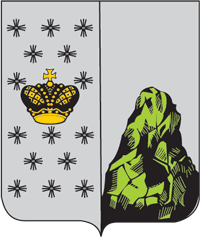
Valday

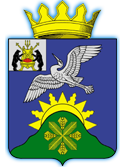
Batetsky District

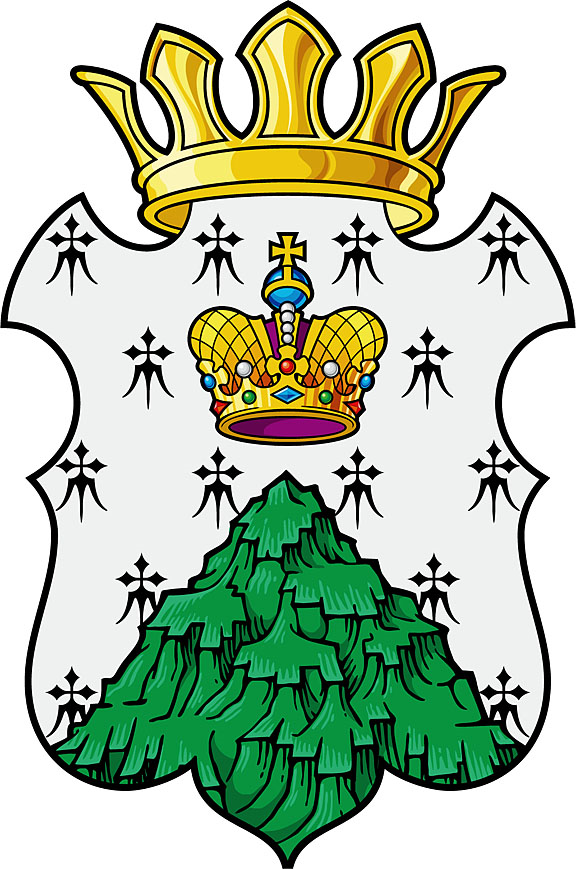
Valdaysky District

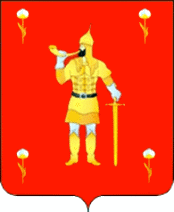
Volotovsky District

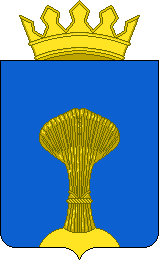
Demyansky District

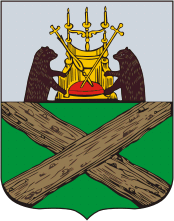
Krestetsky District

Lyubytinsky District

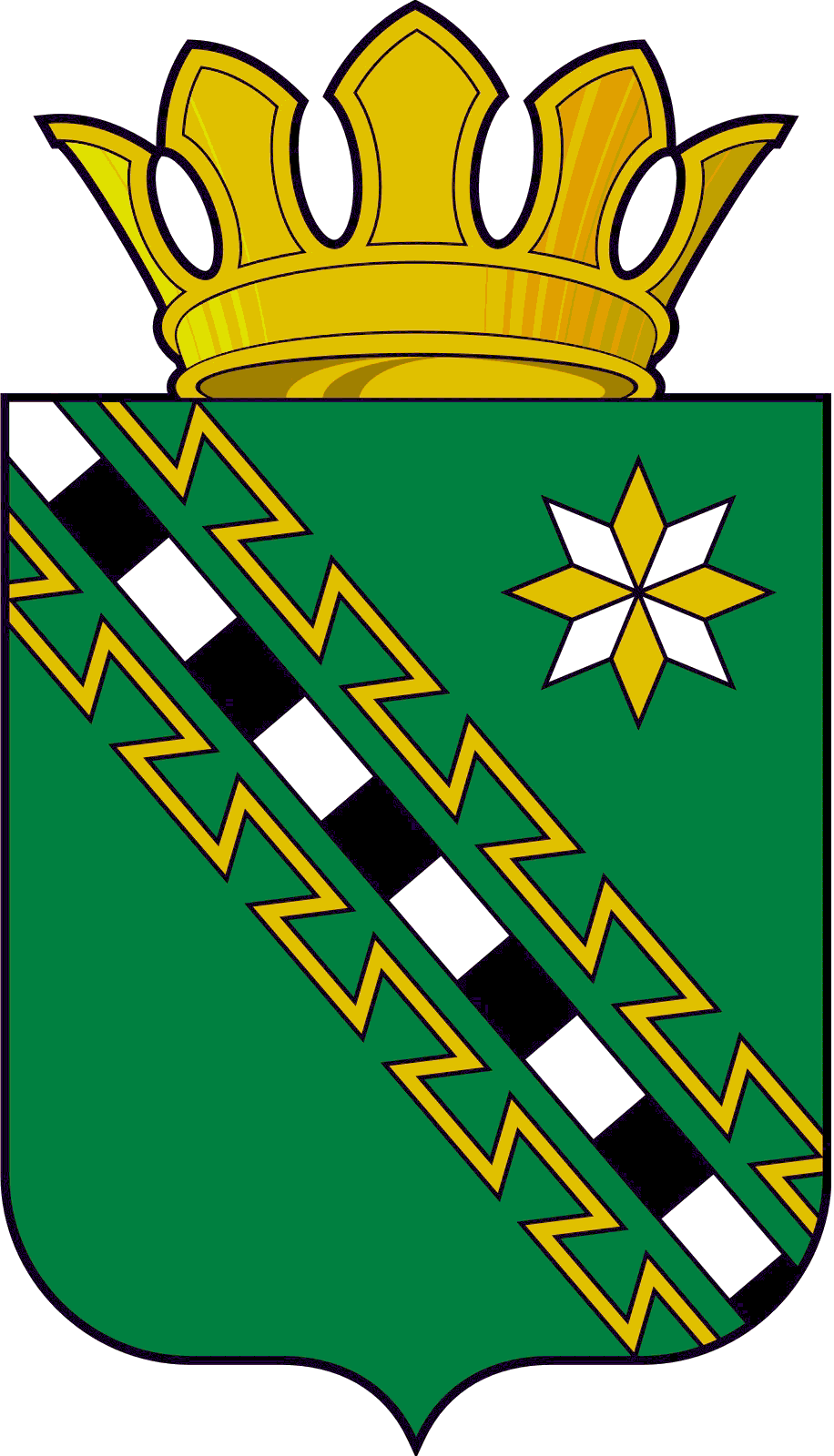
Malovishersky District

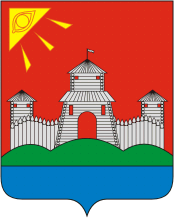
Maryovsky District

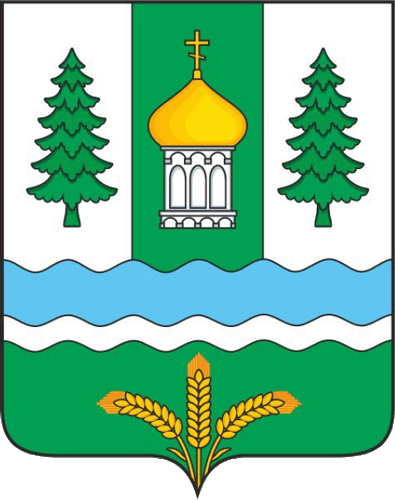
Moshenskoy District

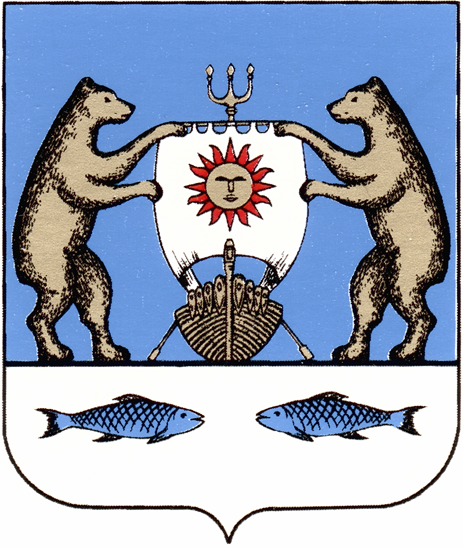
Novgorodsky District

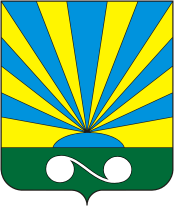
Okulovsky District

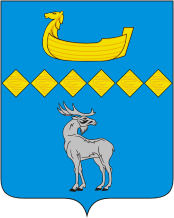
Parfinsky District

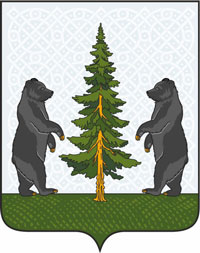
Pestovsky District

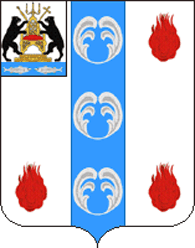
Poddorsky District

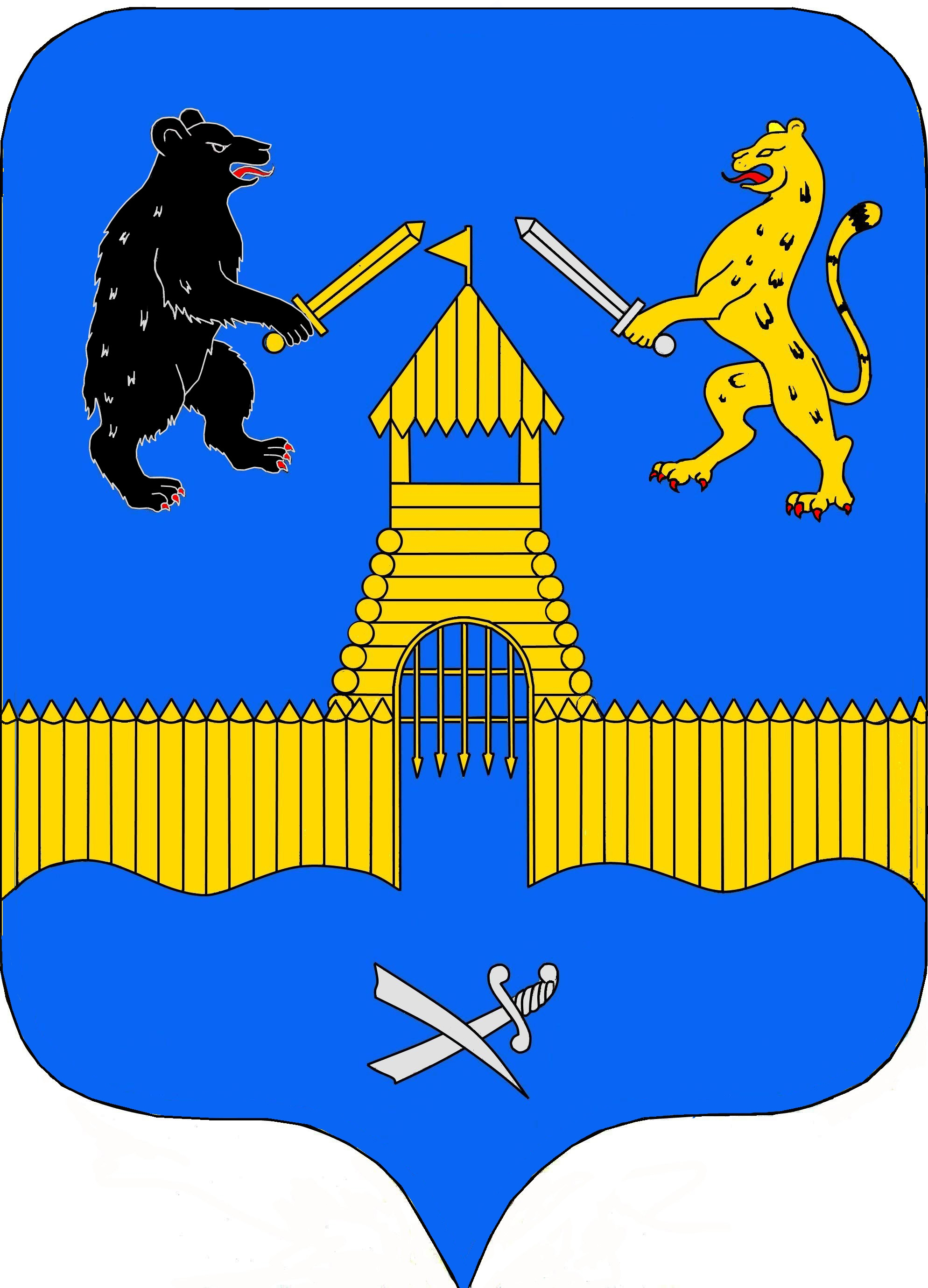
Soletsky District

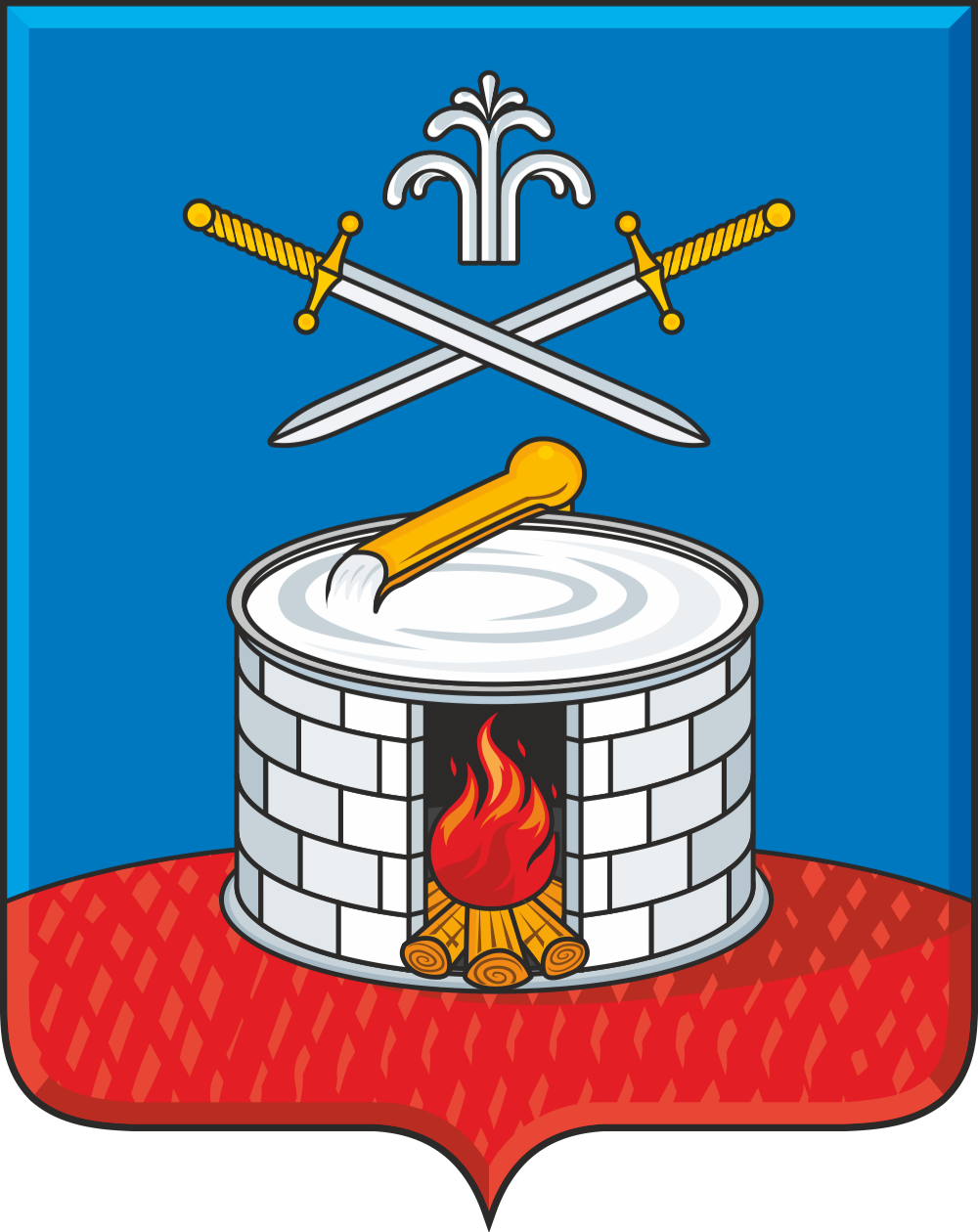
Starorussky District

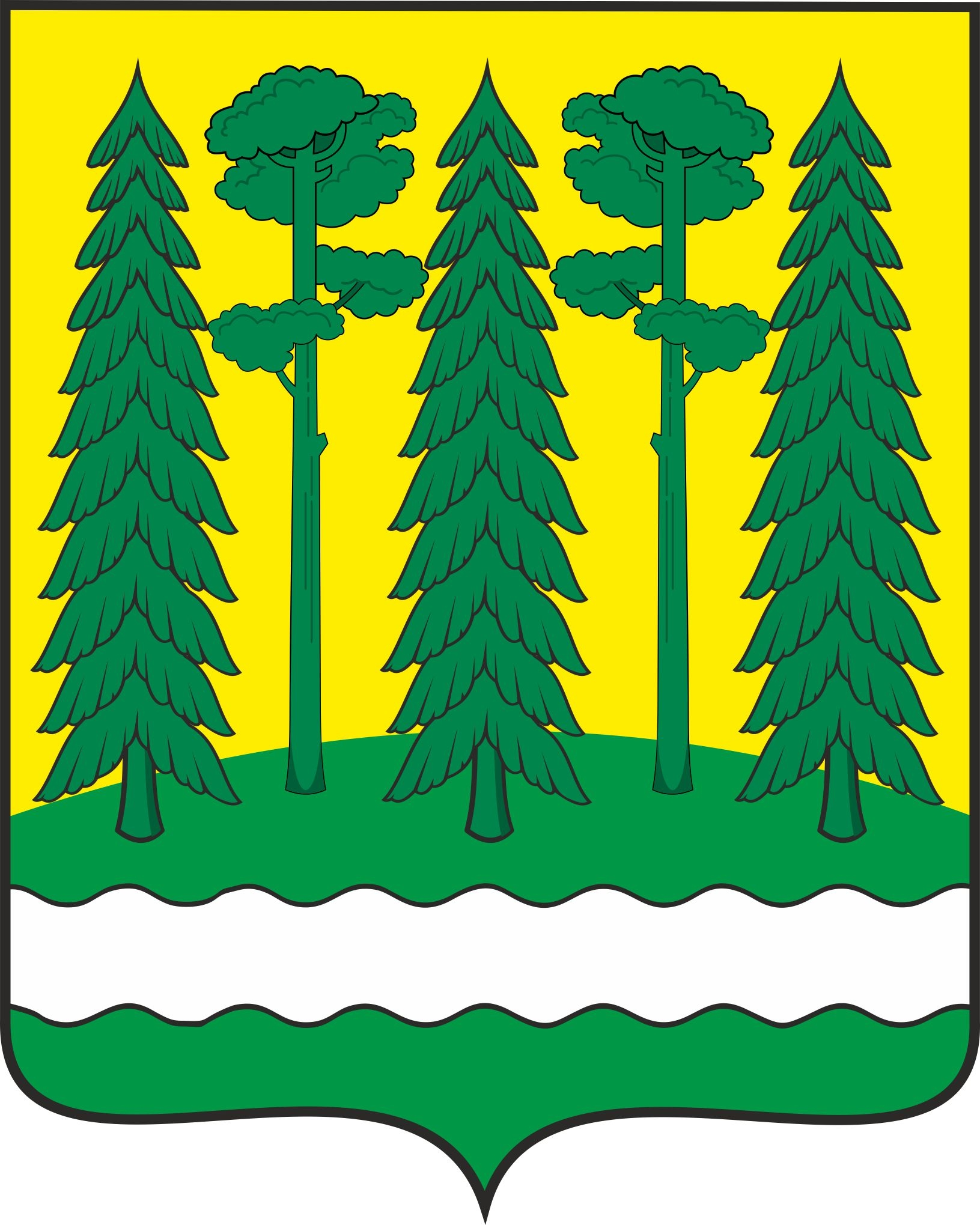
Khvoyninsky District

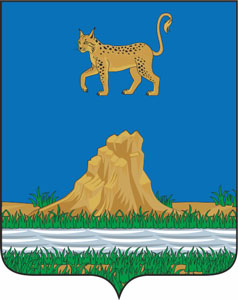
Kholmsky District

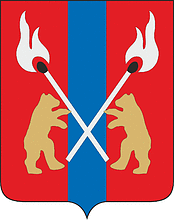
Chudovsky District

Shimsky District

== Novosibirsk Oblast ==
Novosibirsk

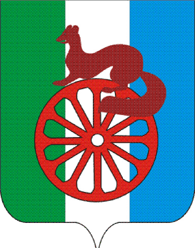
Barabinsk

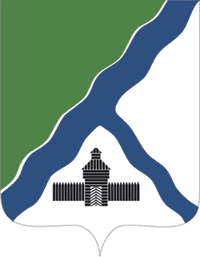
Berdsk

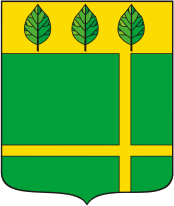
Cherepanovo

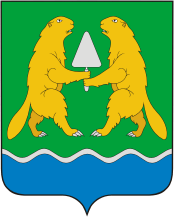
Iskitim

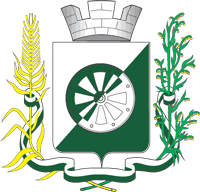
Karasuk

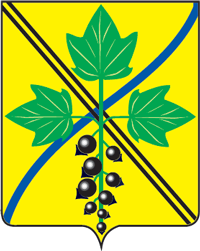
Kargat

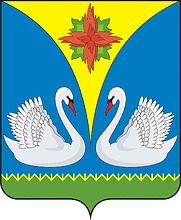
Kupino

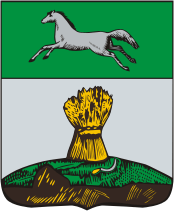
Kolyvan

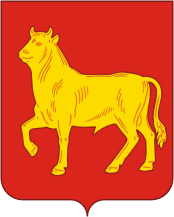
Kuybyshev

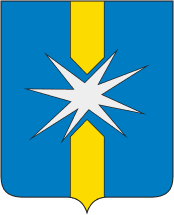
Linyovo

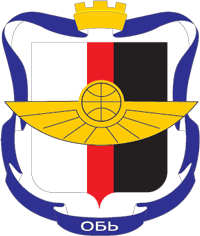
Ob

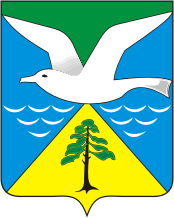
Ordynskoye

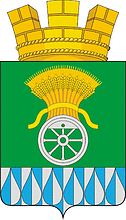
Tatarsk

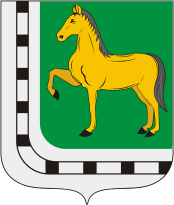
Toguchin

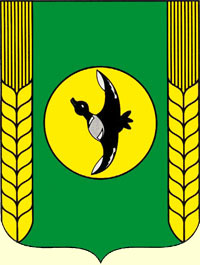
Bagansky District

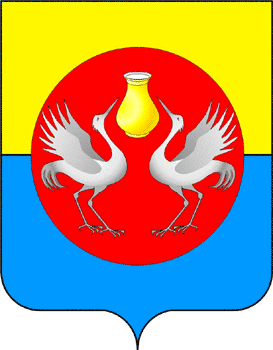
Barabinsky District

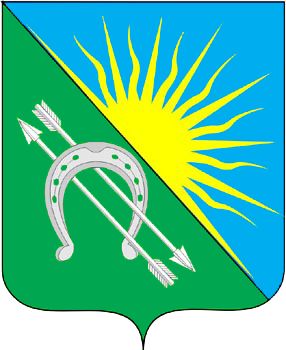
Bolotninsky District

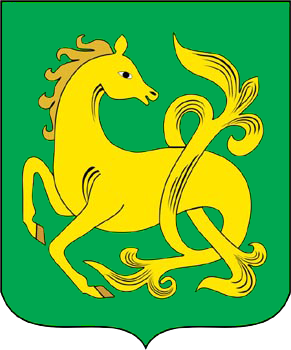
Vengerovsky District

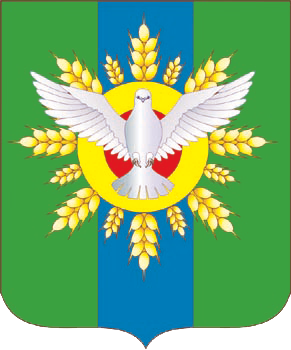
Dovolensky District

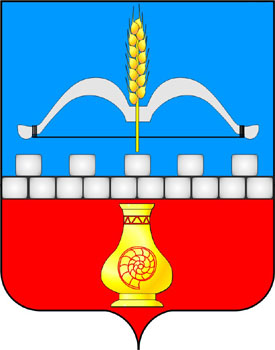
Zdvinsky District

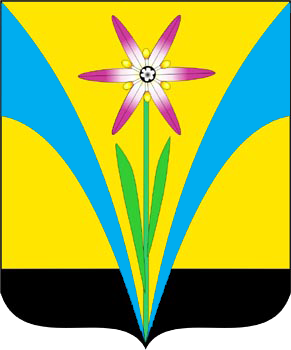
Iskitimsky District

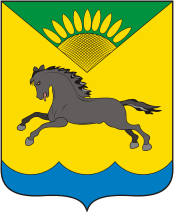
Karasuksky District

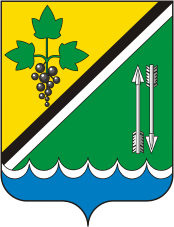
Kargatsky District

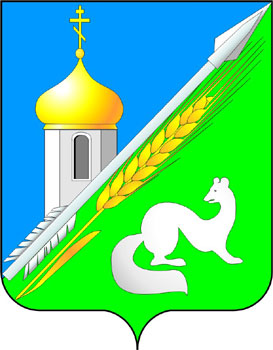
Kolyvansky District

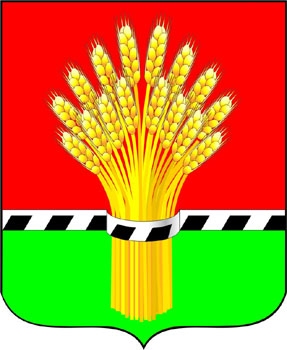
Kochenyovsky District

Kochkovsky District

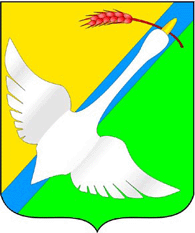
Krasnozyorsky District

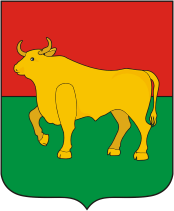
Kuybyshevsky District

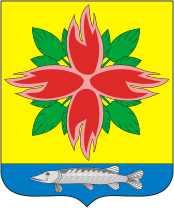
Kupinsky District

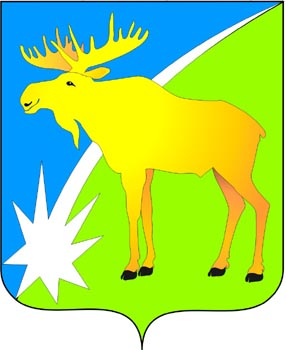
Kyshtovsky District

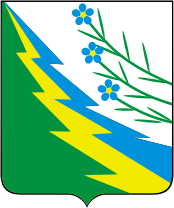
Maslyaninsky District

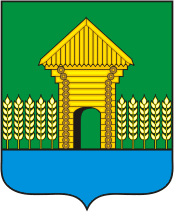
Moshkovsky District

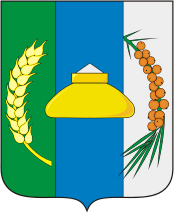
Novosibirsky District

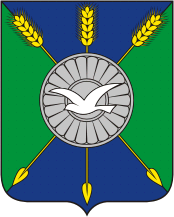
Ordynsky District

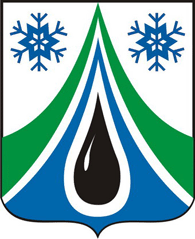
Severny District

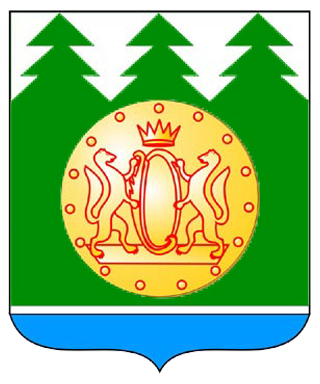
Suzunsky District

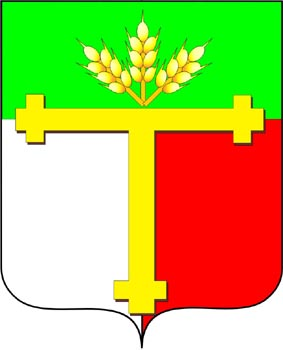
Tatarsky District

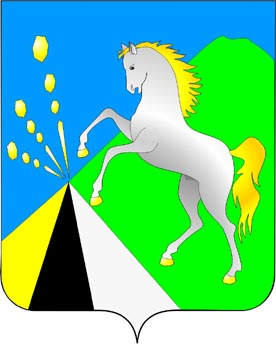
Toguchinsky District

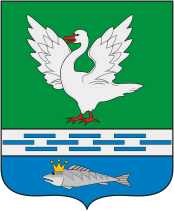
Ubinsky District

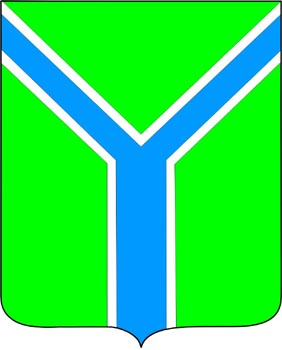
Ust-Tarksky District

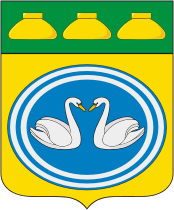
Chanovsky District

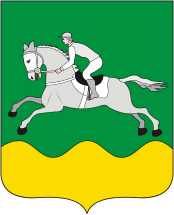
Cherepanovsky District

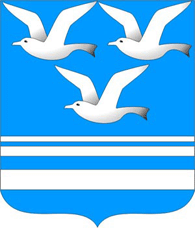
Chistoozyorny District

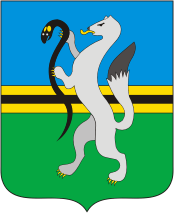
Chulymsky District

== Omsk Oblast ==
Omsk

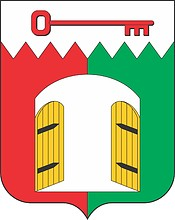
Isilkul

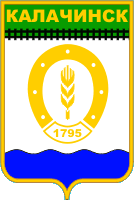
Kalachinsk

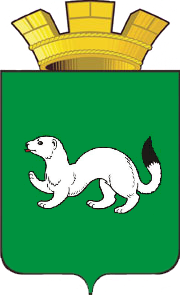
Tara

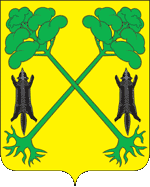
Tyukalinsk

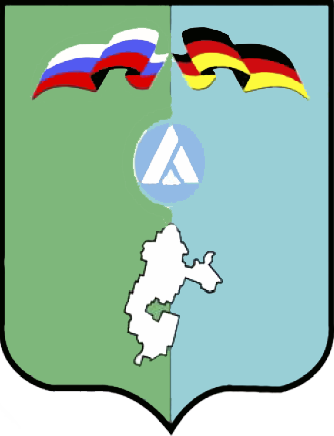
Azovsky Nemetsky National District

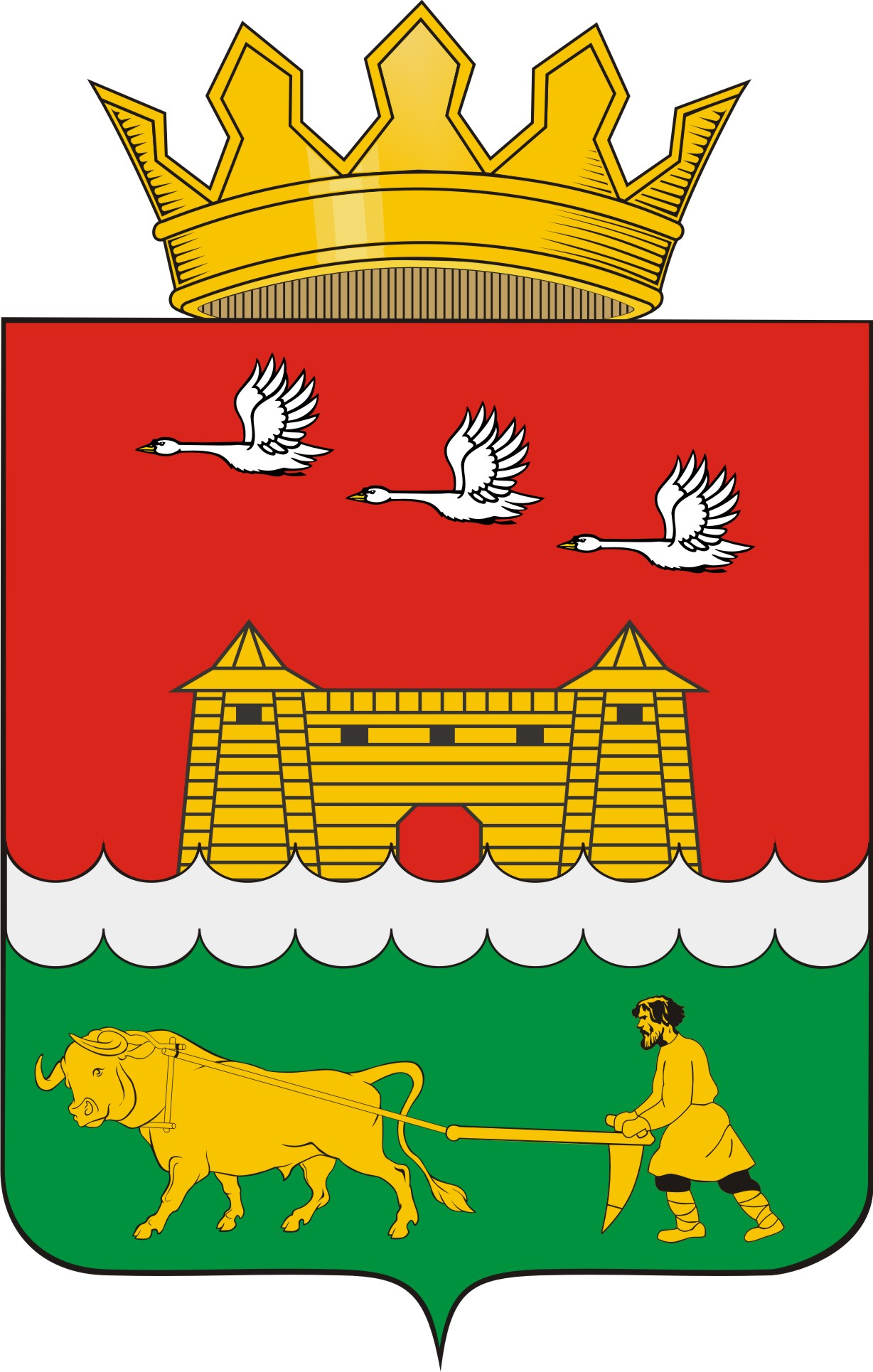
Bolsherechensky District

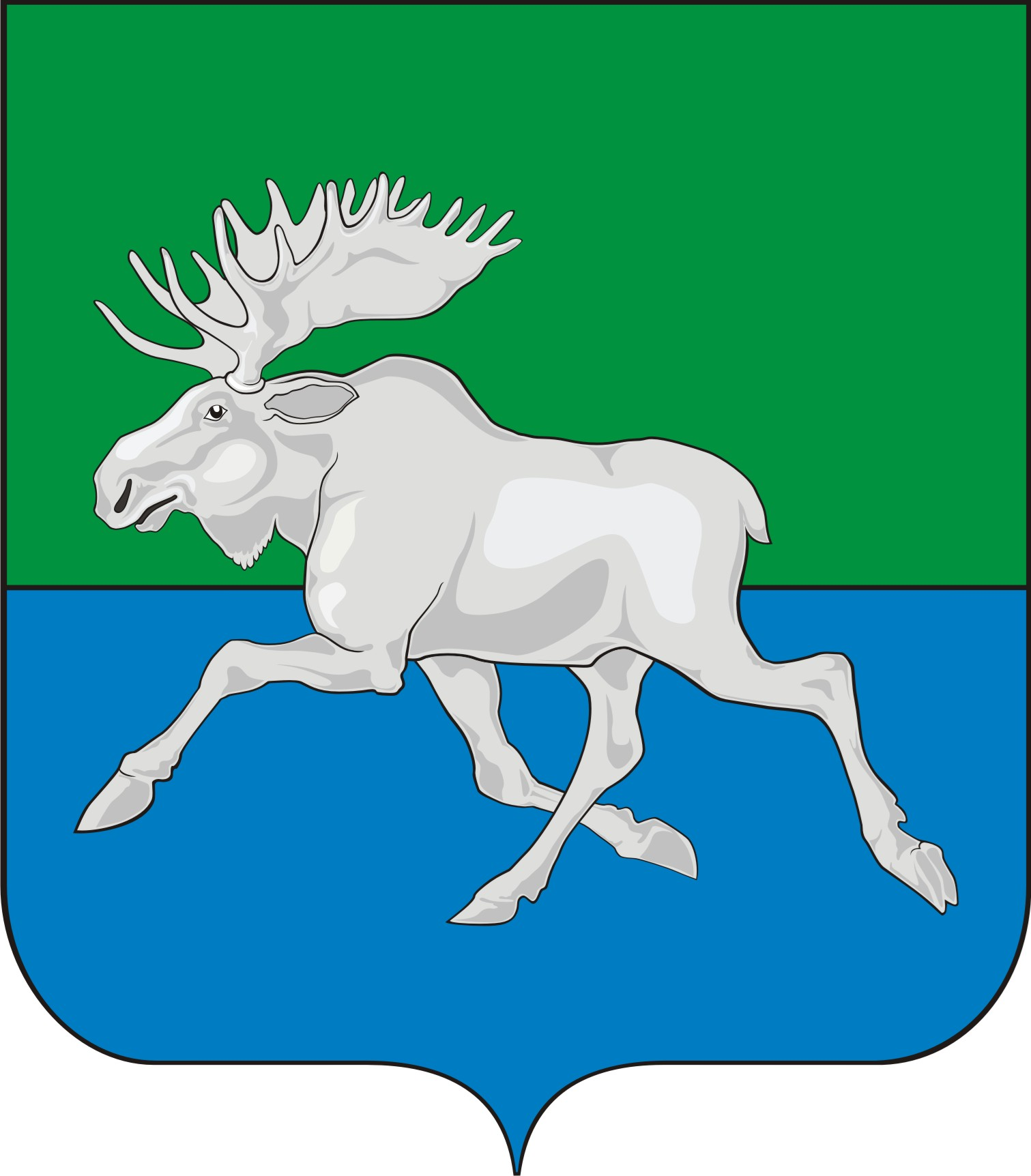
Bolsheukovsky District

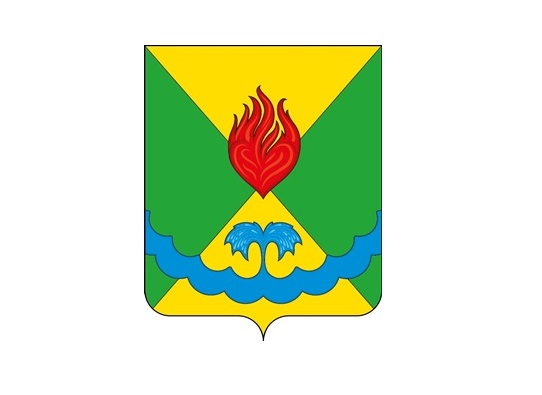
Gorkovsky District

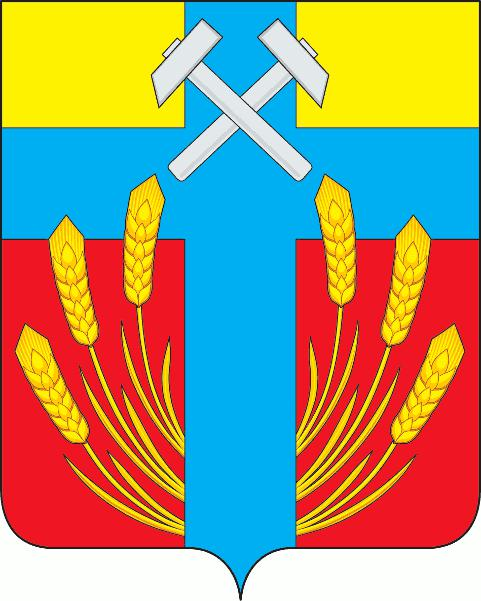
Isilkulsky District

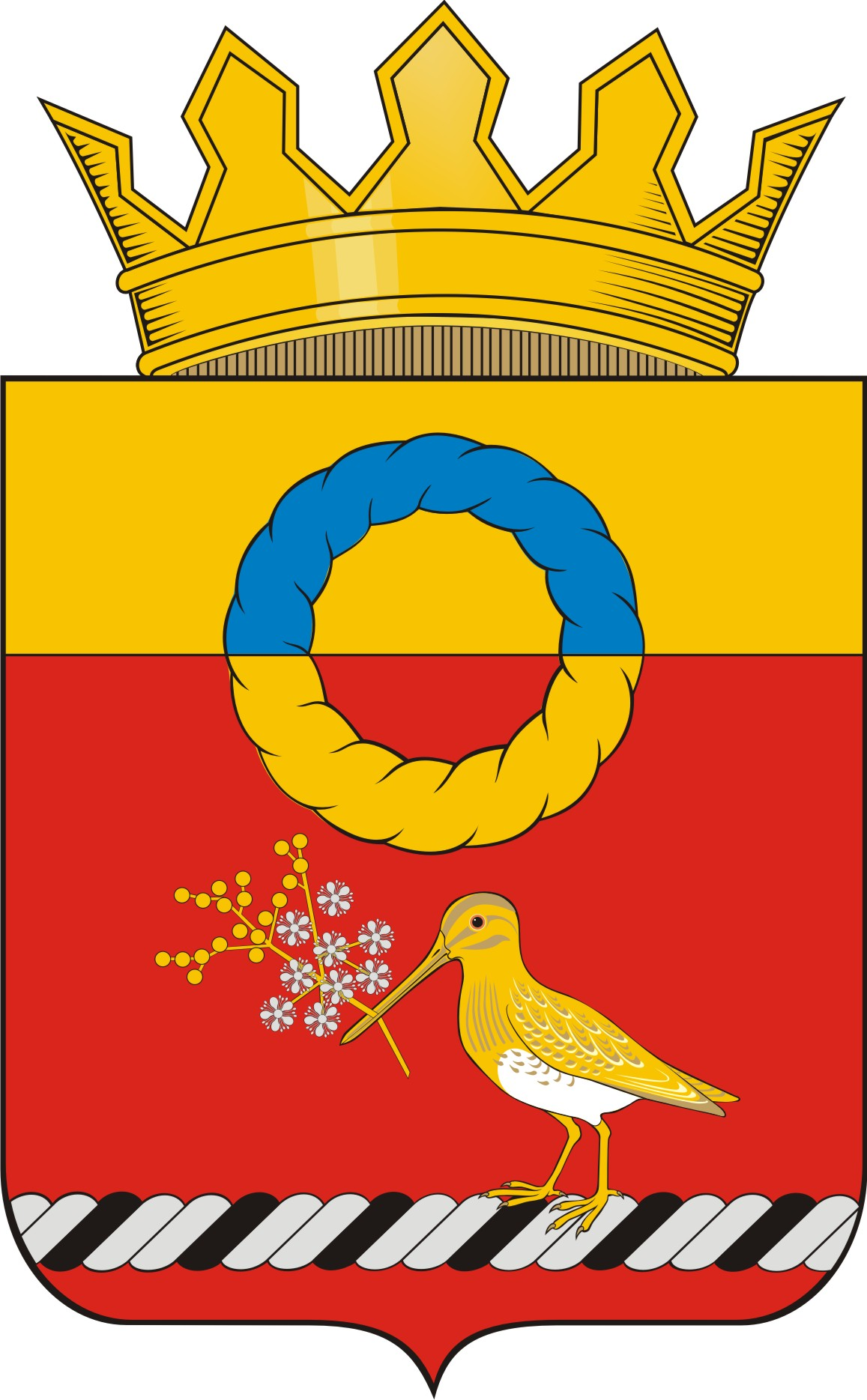
Kalachinsky District

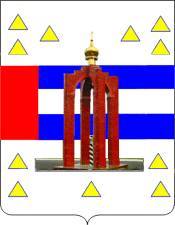
Kolosovsky District

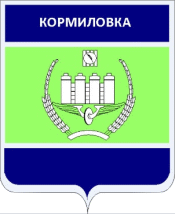
Kormilovsky District

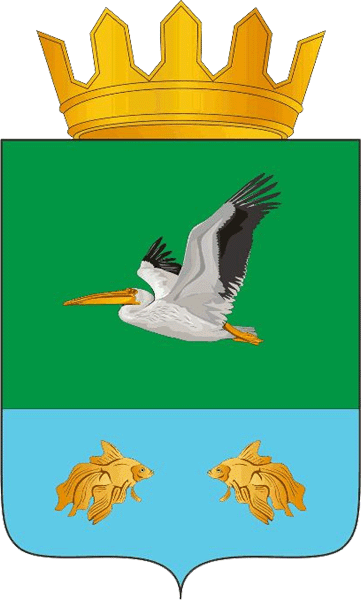
Krutinsky District

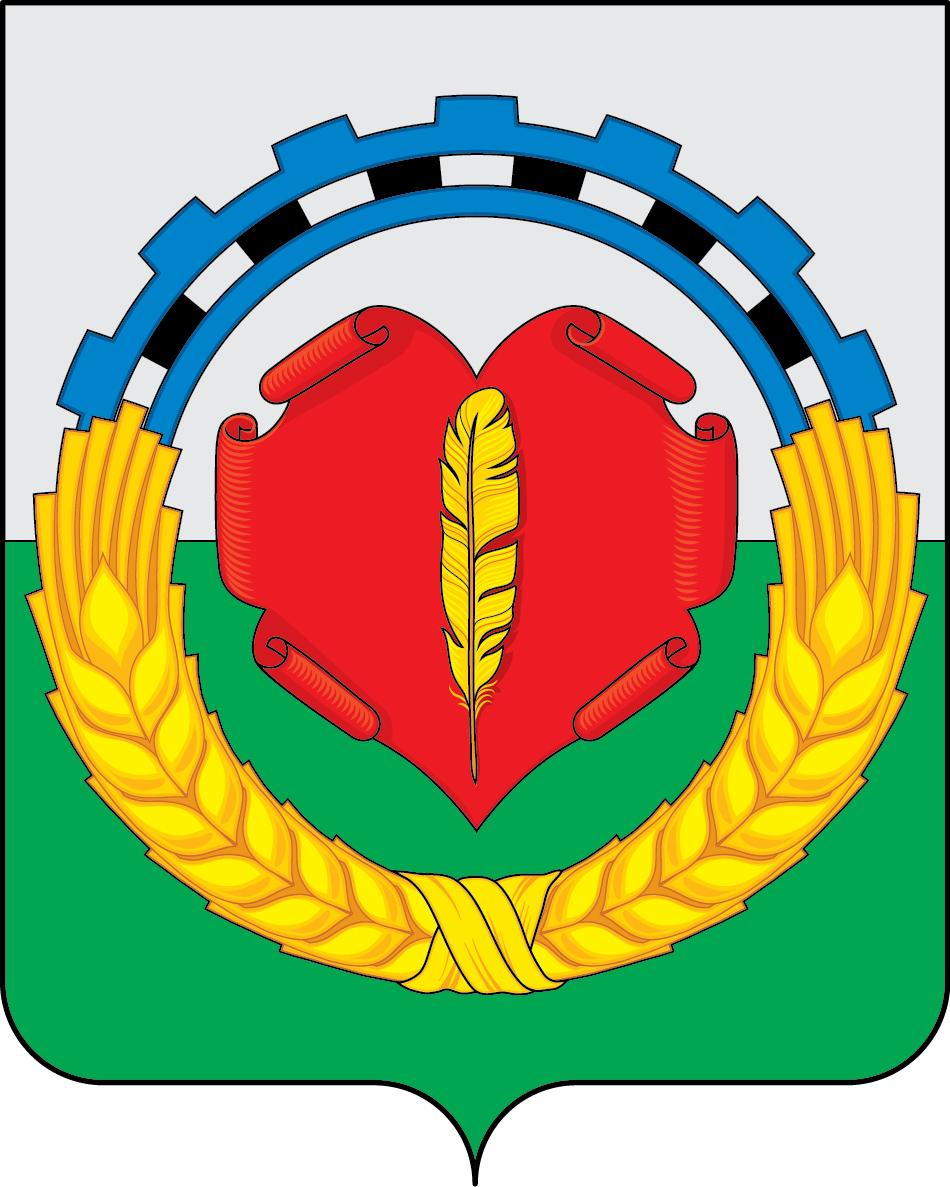
Lyubinsky District

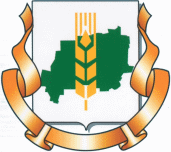
Maryanovsky District

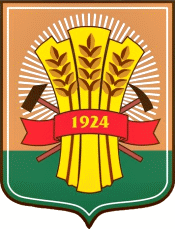
Moskalensky District

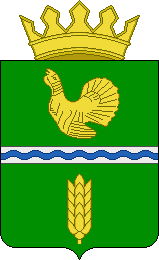
Muromtsevsky District

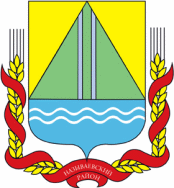
Nazyvayevsky District

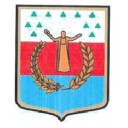
Nizhneomsky District

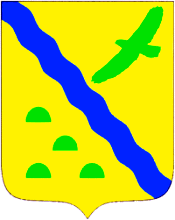
Novovarshavsky District

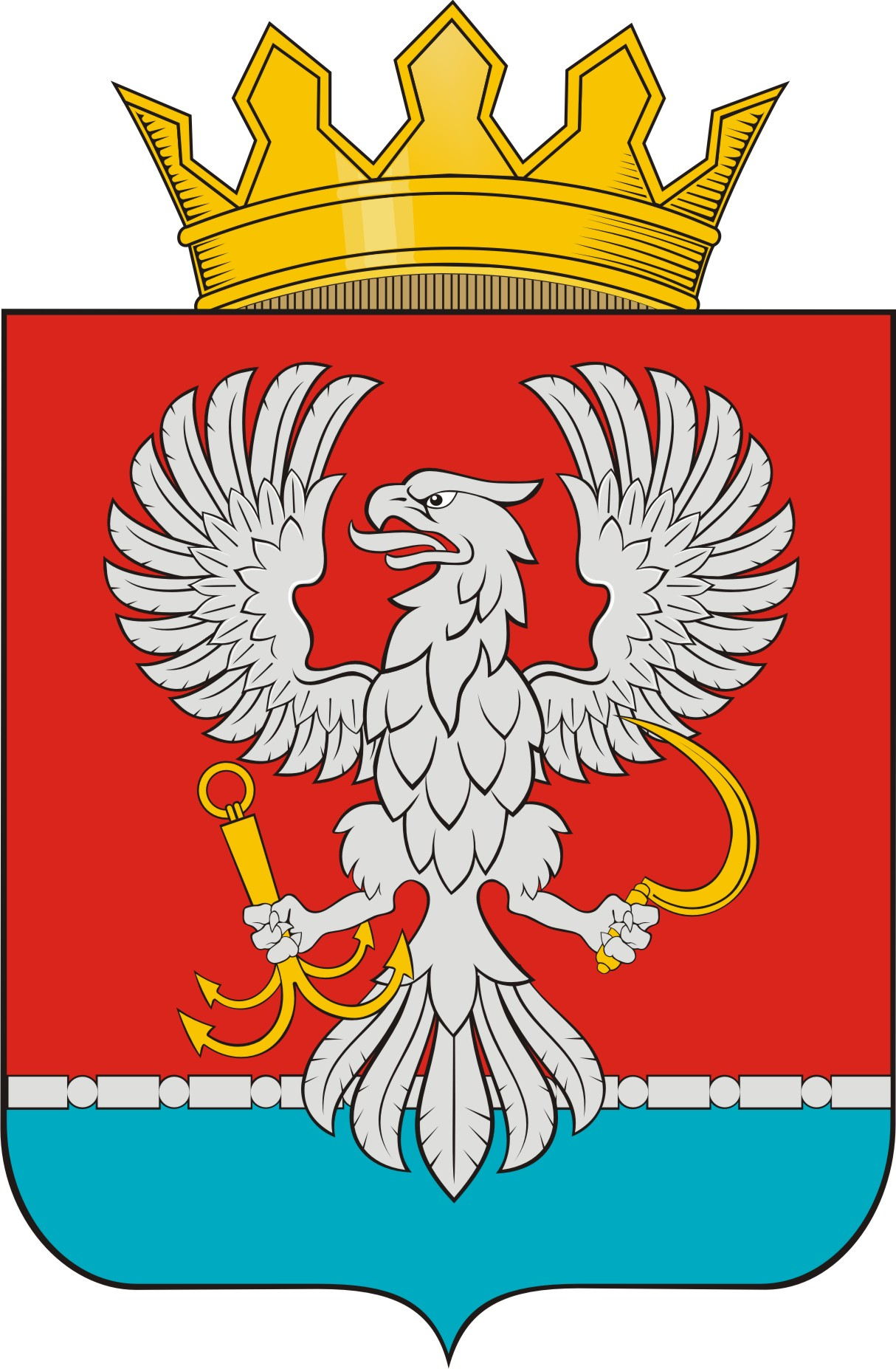
Odessky District

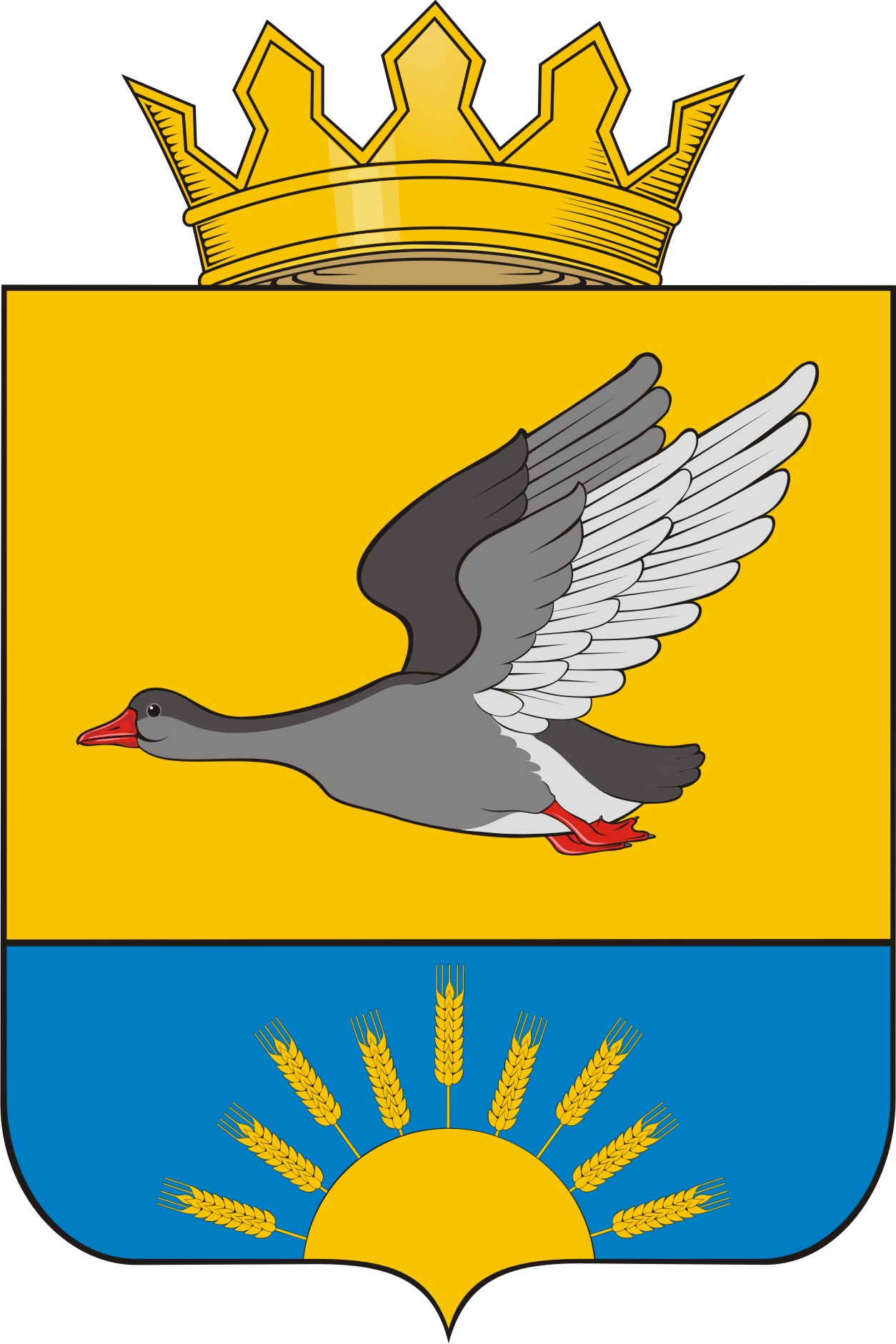
Okoneshnikovsky District

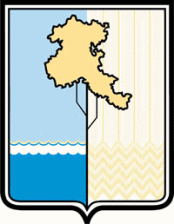
Omsky District

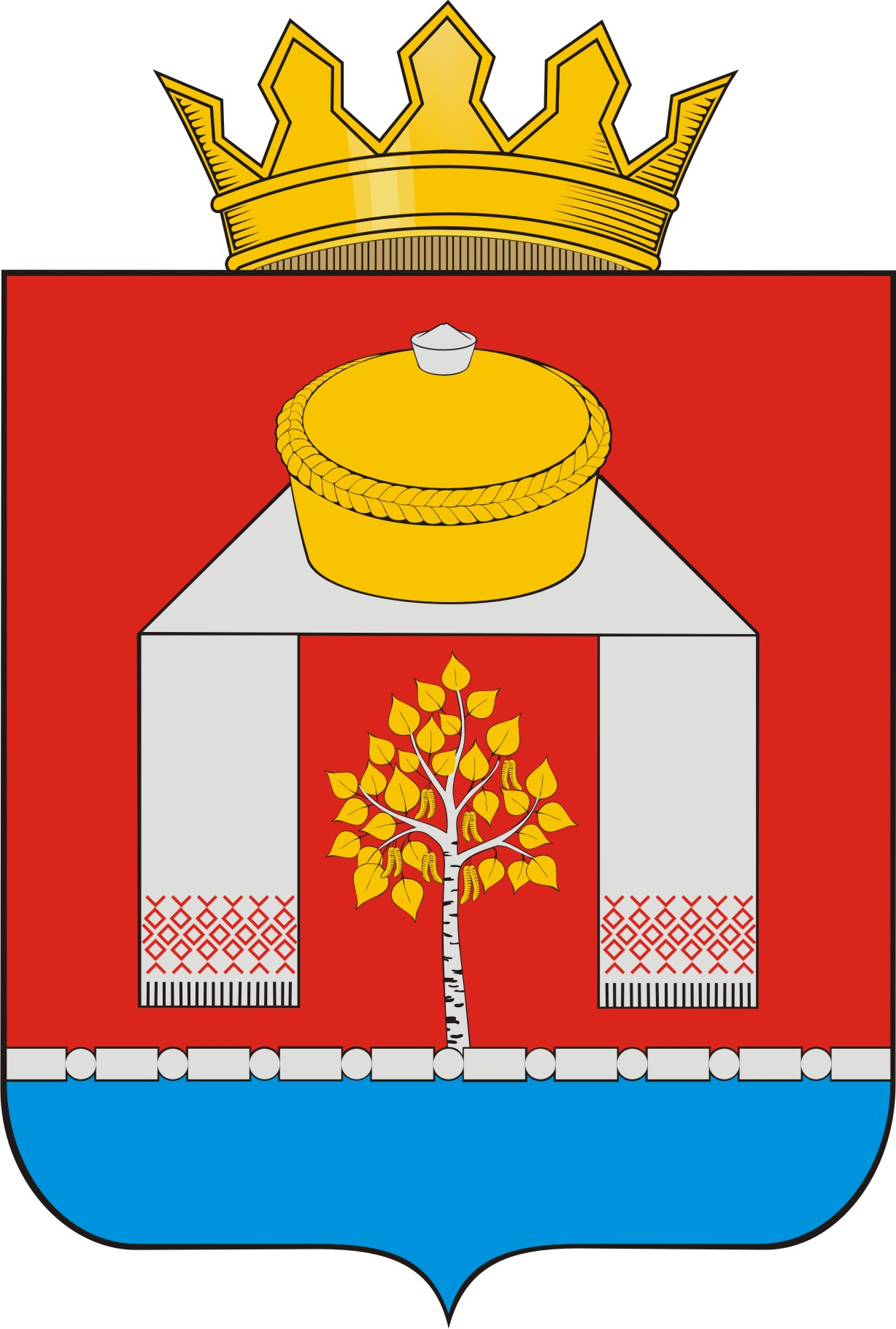
Pavlogradsky District

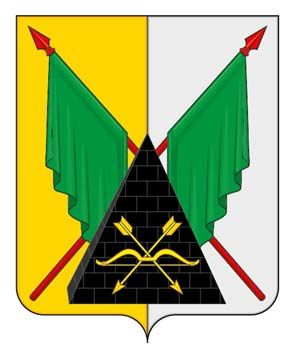
Poltavsky District

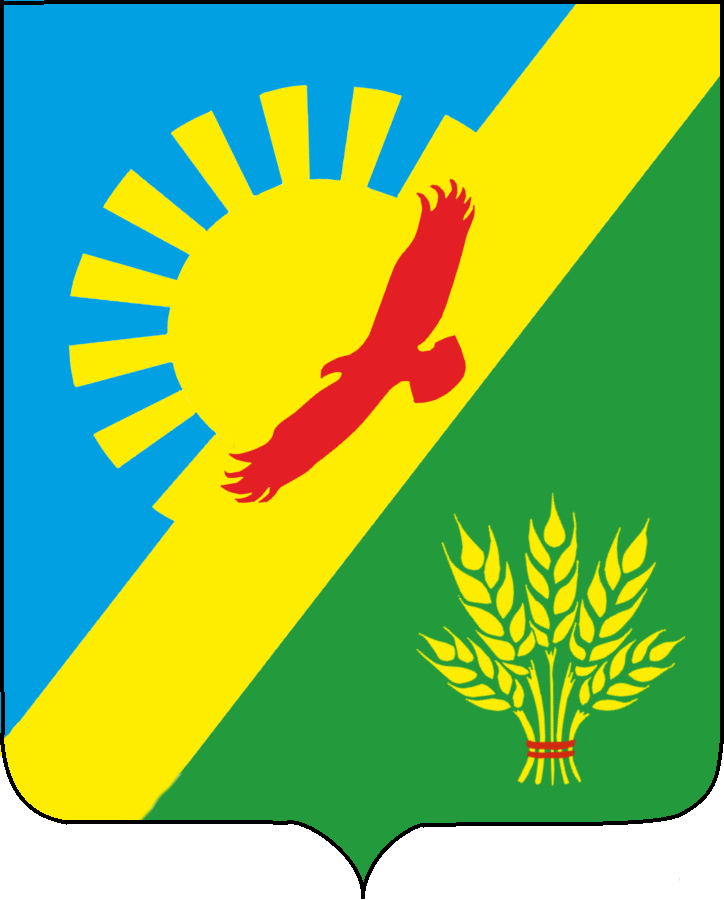
Russko-Polyansky District

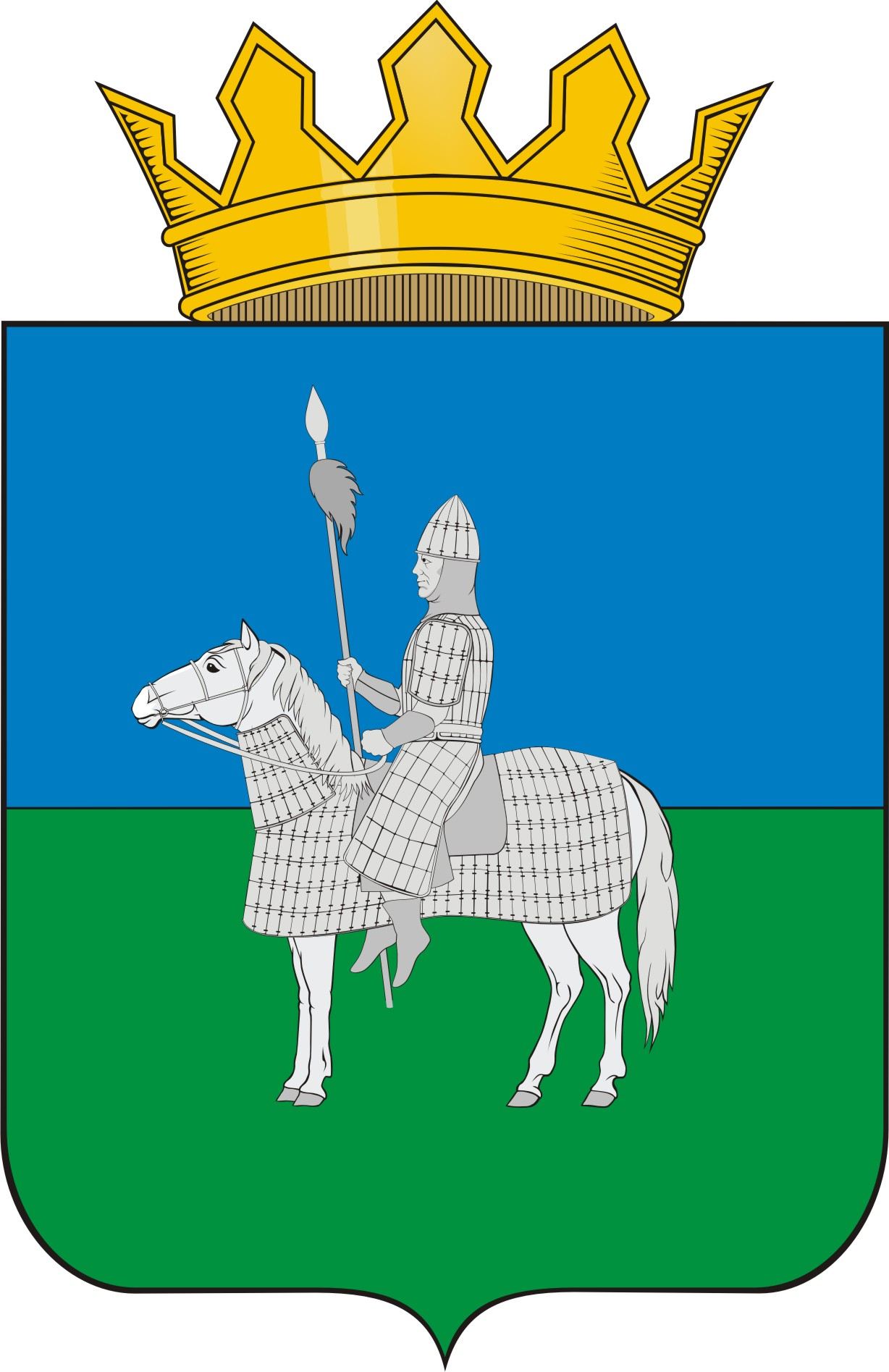
Sargatsky District

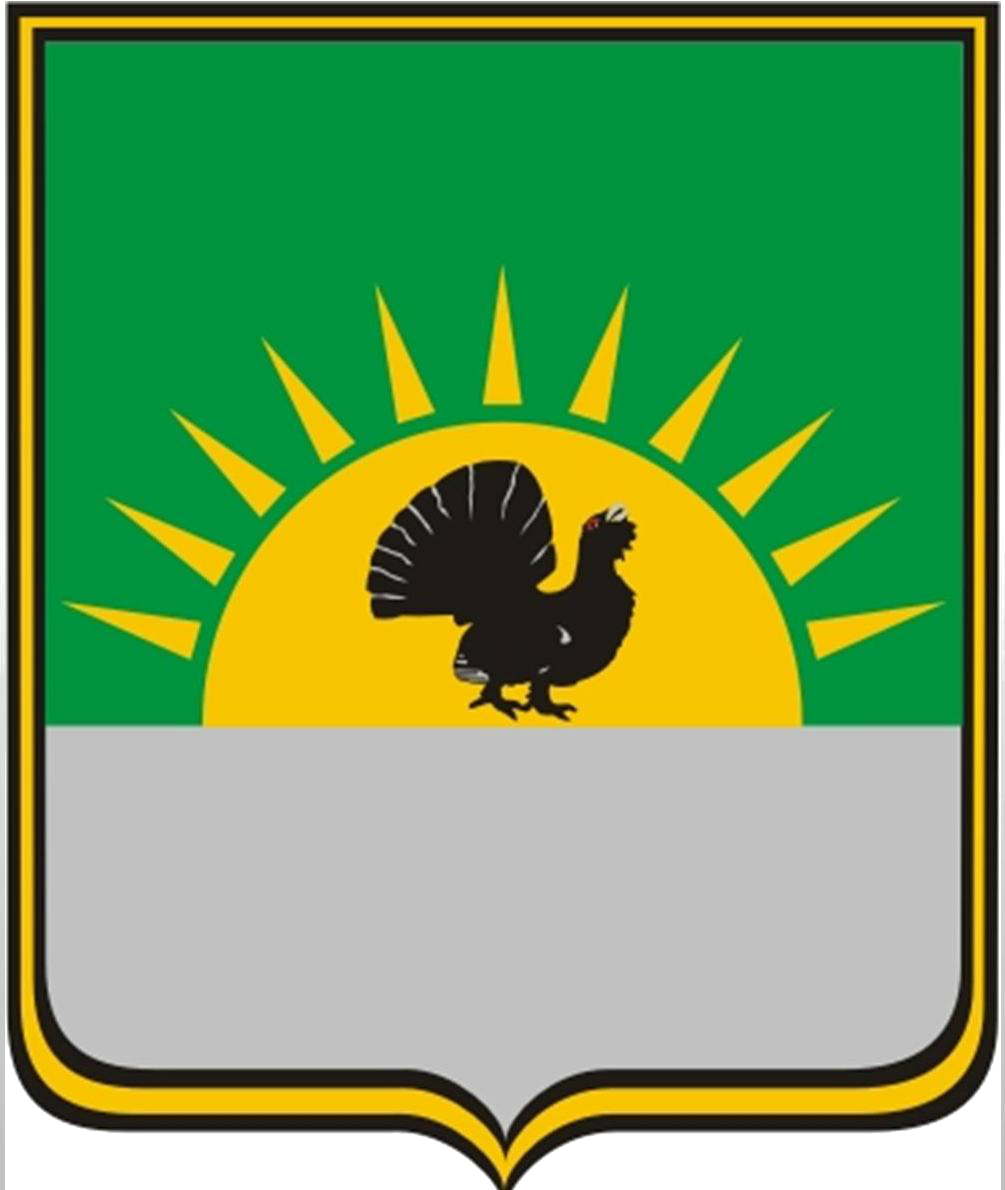
Sedelnikovsky District

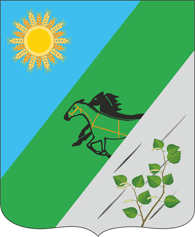
Tavrichesky District

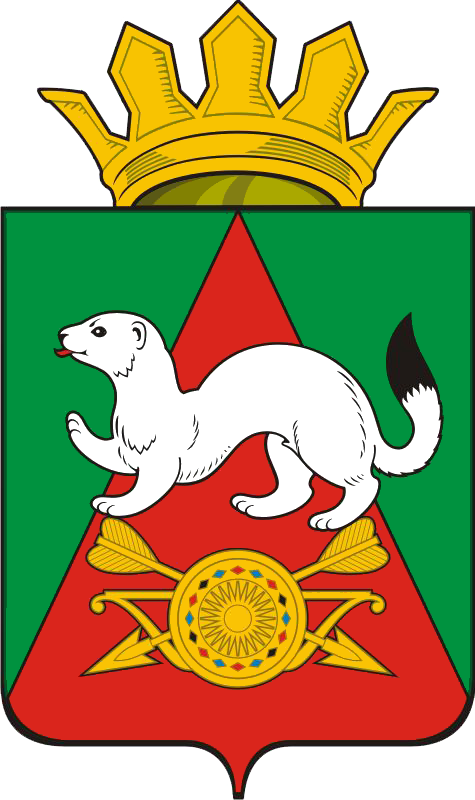
Tarsky District

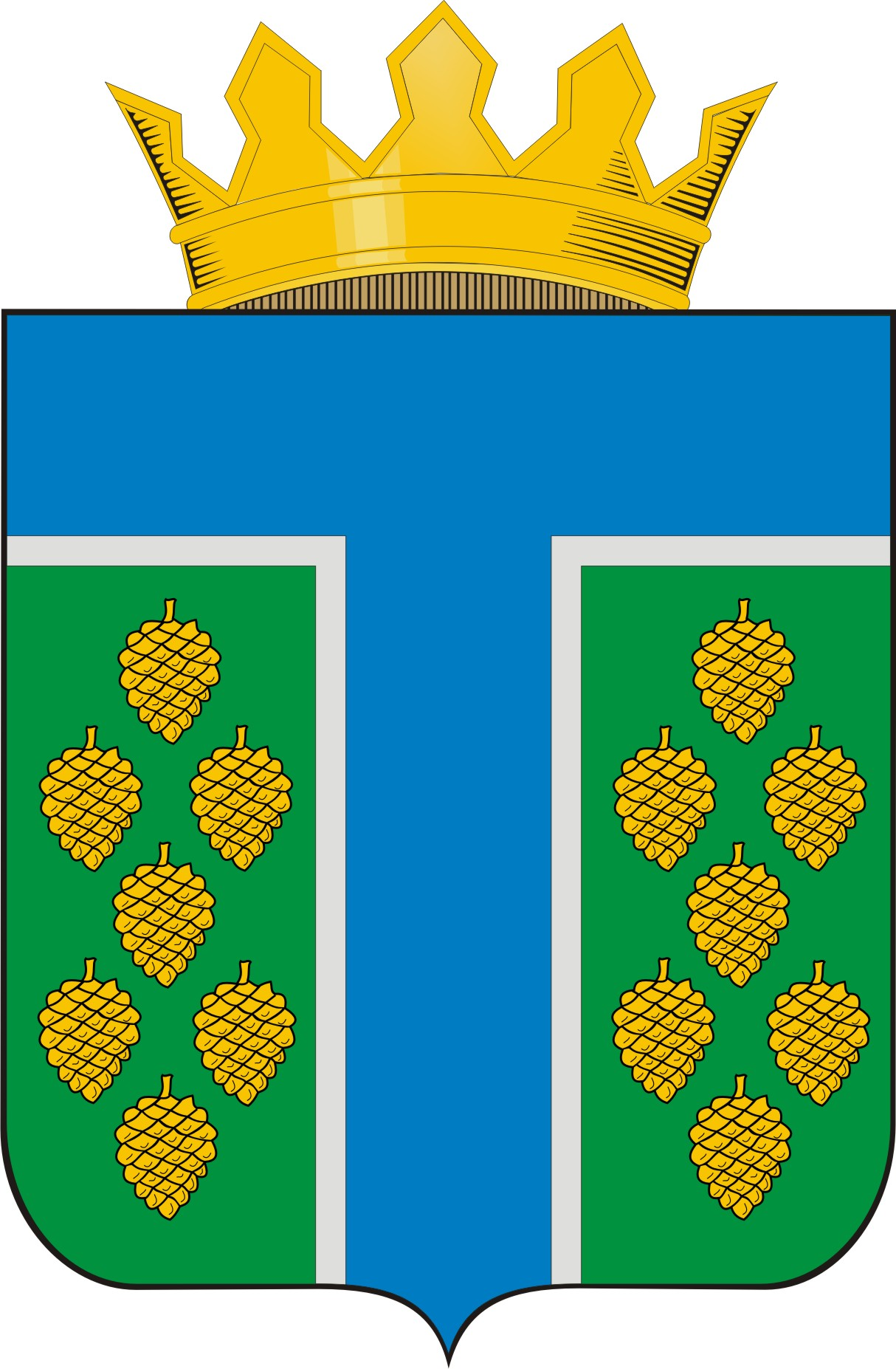
Tevrizsky District

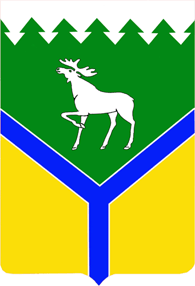
Ust-Ishimsky District

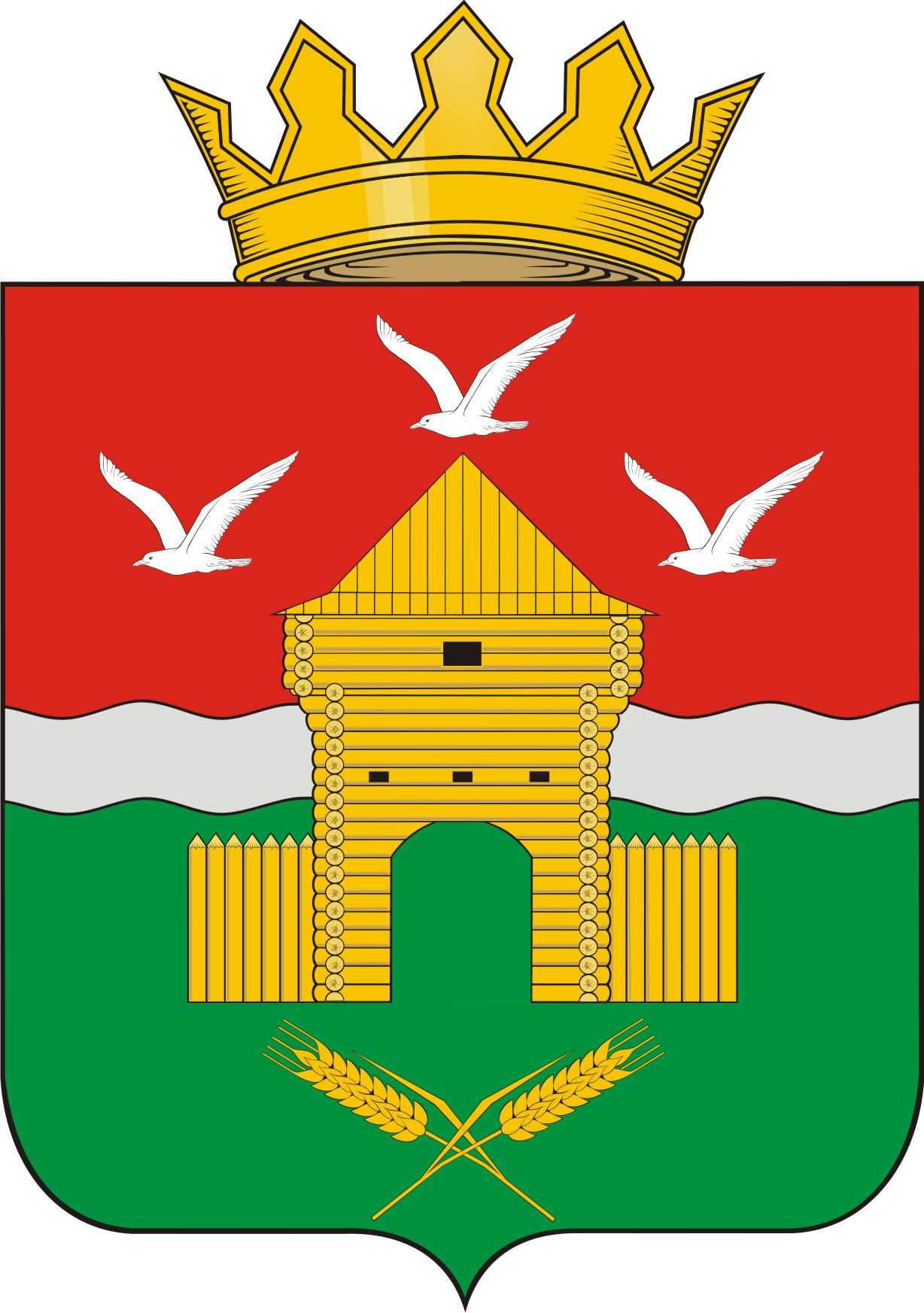
Cherlaksky District

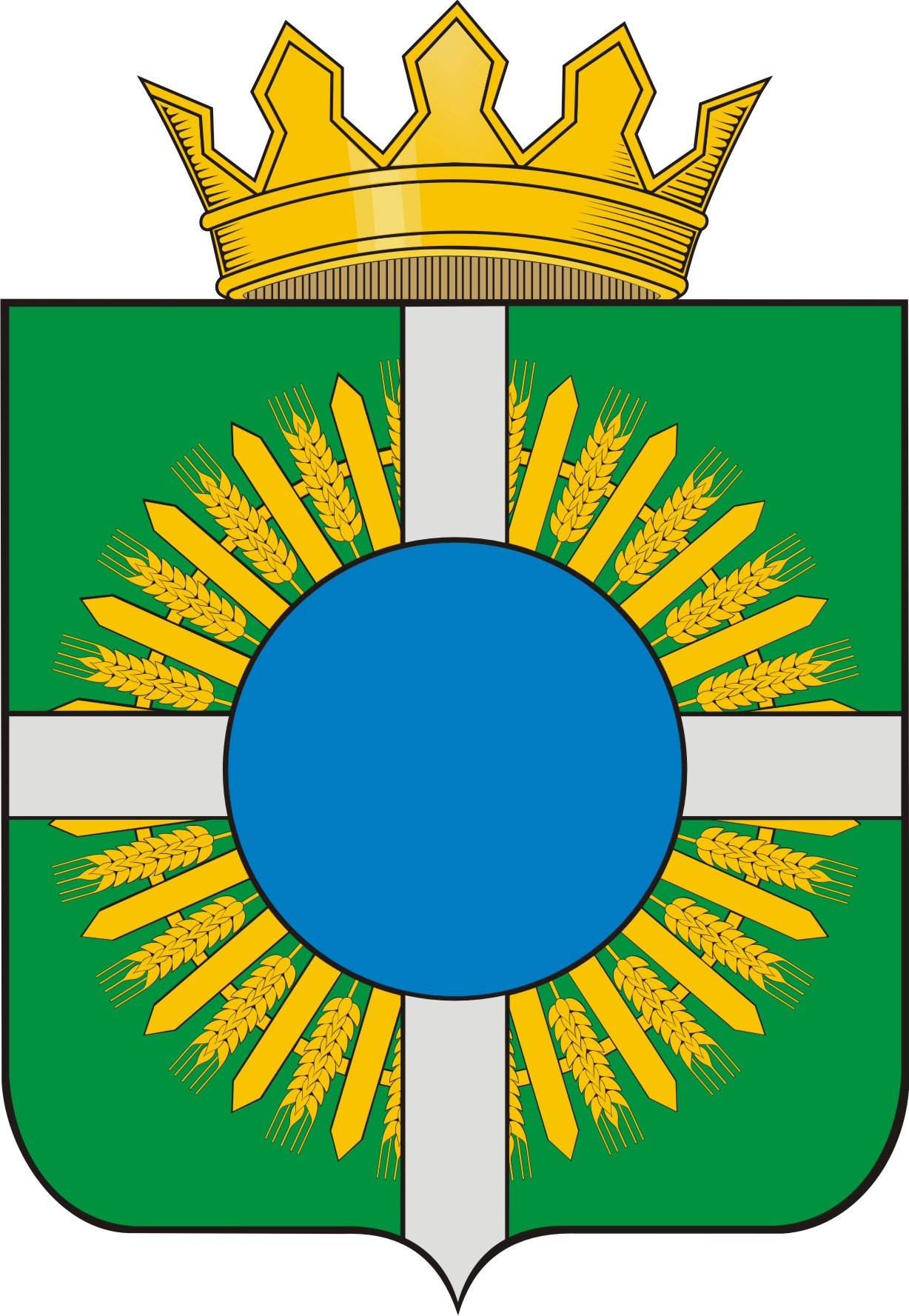
Sherbakulsky District

== Orenburg Oblast ==
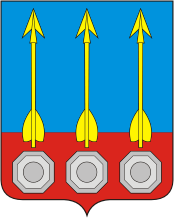
Komarovsky

Orenburg

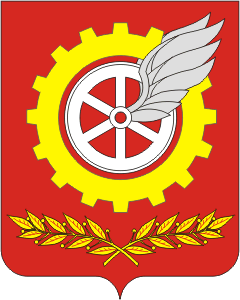
Abdulino

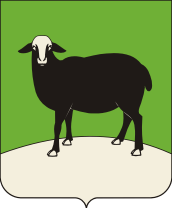
Buguruslan

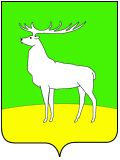
Buzuluk

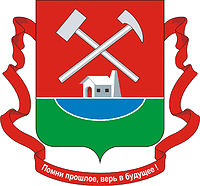
Gay

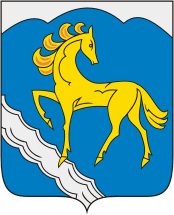
Kuvandyk

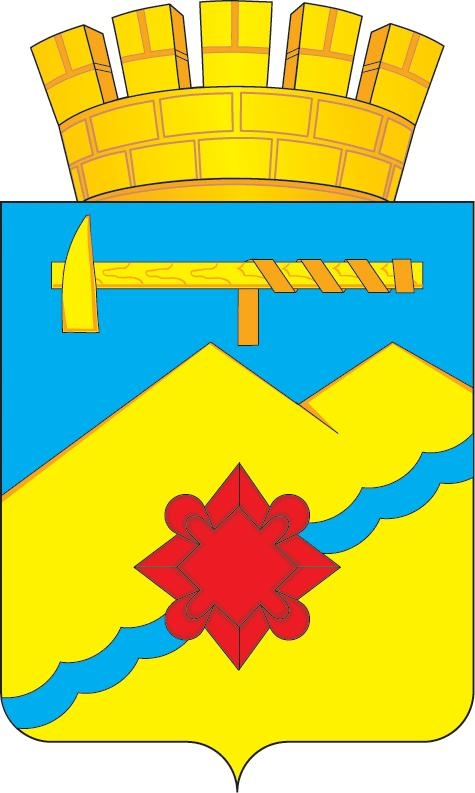
Mednogorsk

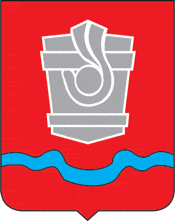
Novotroitsk

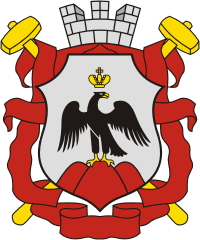
Orsk

Sol-Iletsk

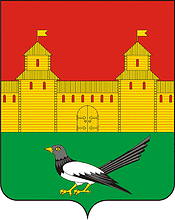
Sorochinsk

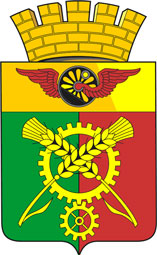
Abdulinsky District

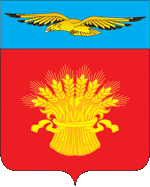
Adamovsky District

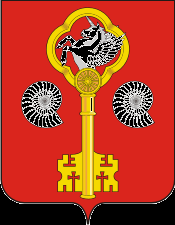
Akbulaksky District

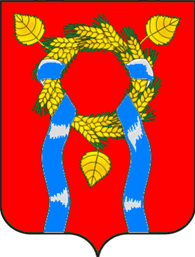
Alexandrovsky District

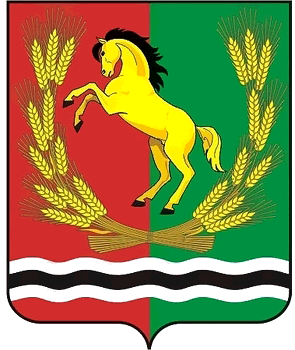
Asekeyevsky District

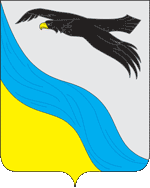
Belyayevsky District

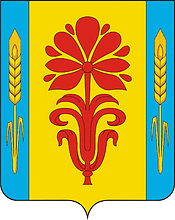
Buguruslansky District

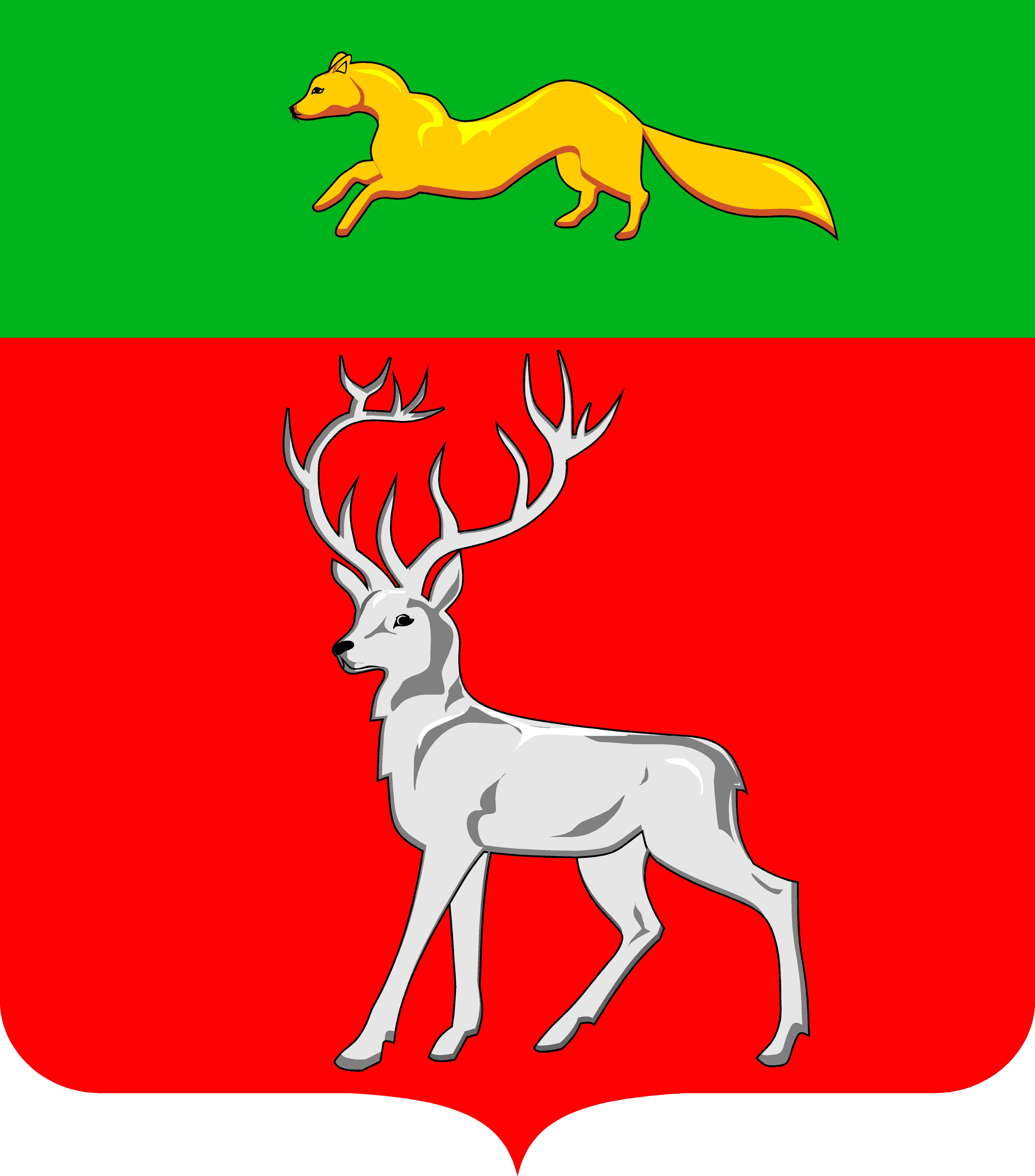
Buzuluksky District

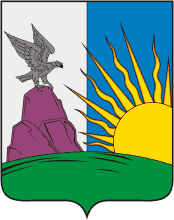
Gaysky District

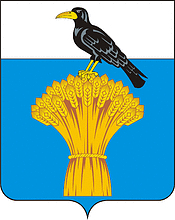
Grachyovsky District

Dombarovsky District

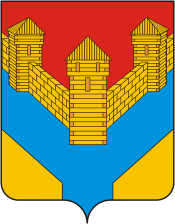
Ileksky District

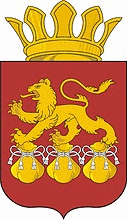
Kvarkensky District

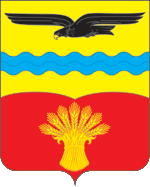
Krasnogvardeysky District

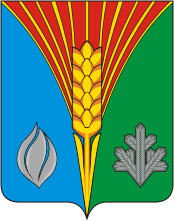
Kurmanayevsky District

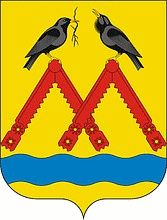
Matveyevsky District

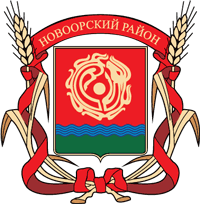
Novoorsky District

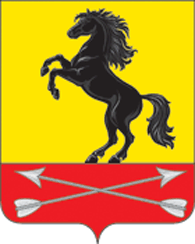
Novosergiyevsky District

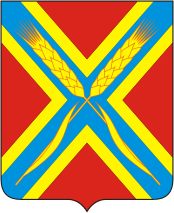
Oktyabrsky District

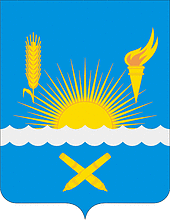
Orenburgsky District

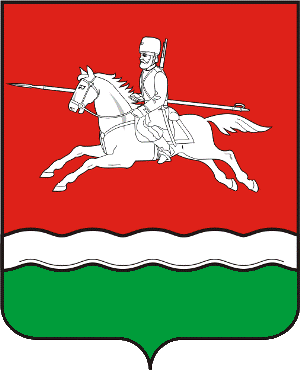
Pervomaysky District

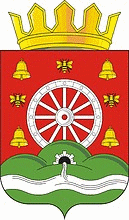
Ponomaryovsky District

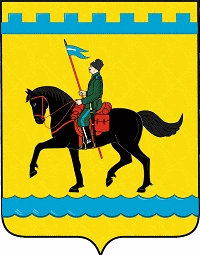
Sakmarsky District

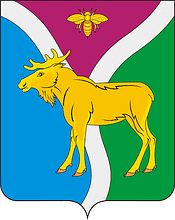
Severny District

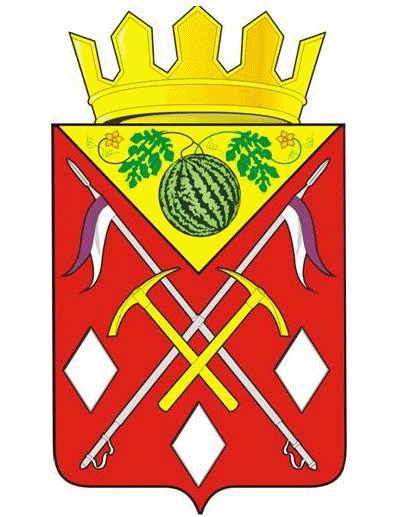
Sol-Iletsky District

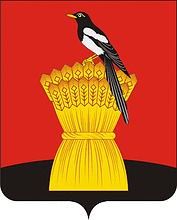
Sorochinsky District

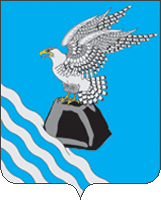
Tashlinsky District

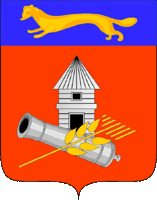
Totsky District

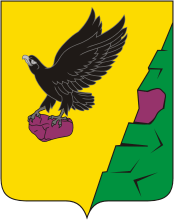
Tyulgansky District

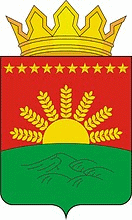
Sharlyksky District

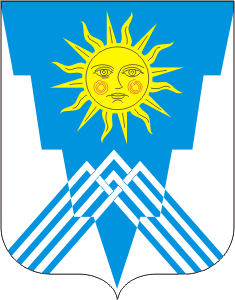
Yasnensky District

== Oryol Oblast ==
Oryol

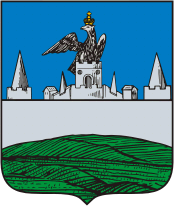
Bolkhov

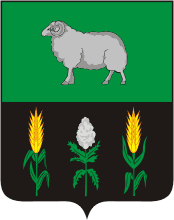
Dmitrovsk

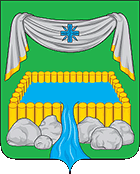
Dolgoye

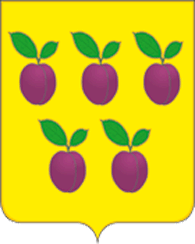
Kromy

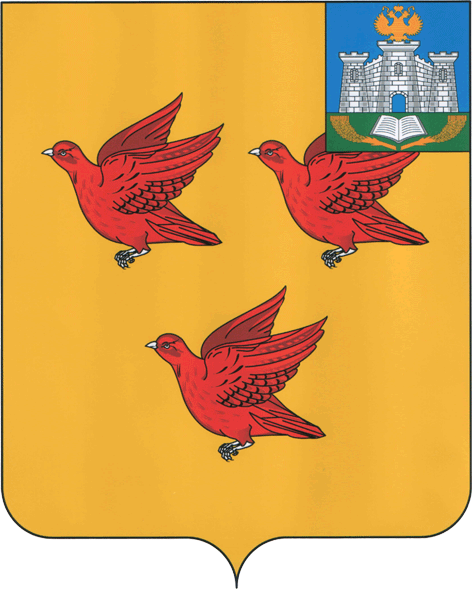
Livny

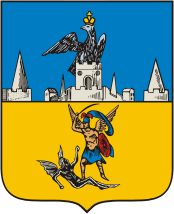
Maloarkhangelsk

Mtsensk

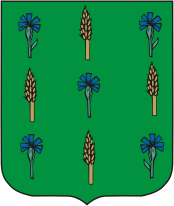
Novosil

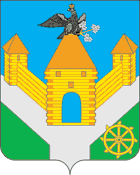
Znamenka

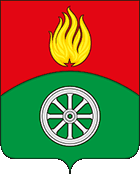
Verkhovye

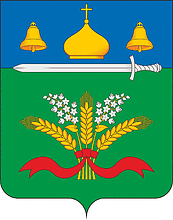
Bolkhovsky District

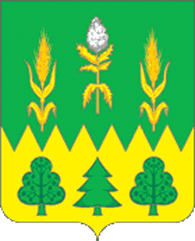
Dmitrovsky District

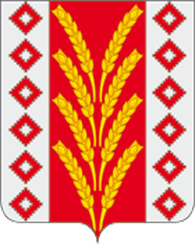
Dolzhansky District

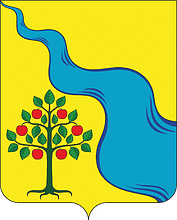
Glazunovsky District

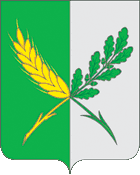
Khotynetsky District

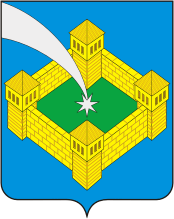
Kolpnyansky District

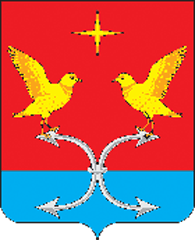
Korsakovsky District

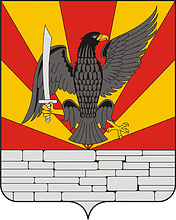
Krasnozorensky District

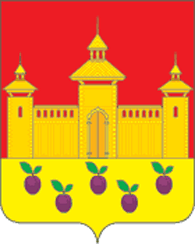
Kromskoy District

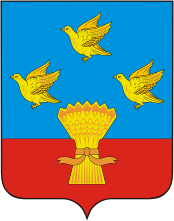
Livensky District

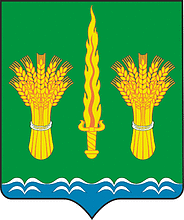
Maloarkhangelsky District

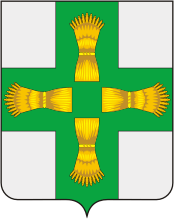
Mtsensky District

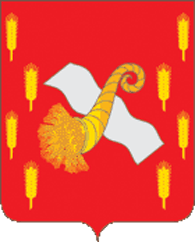
Novoderevenkovsky District

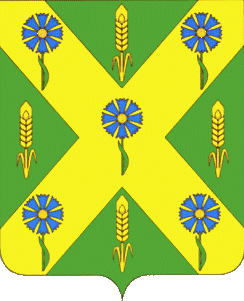
Novosilsky District

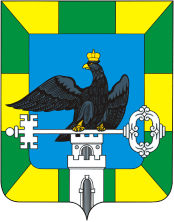
Orlovsky District

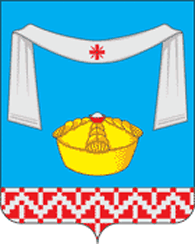
Pokrovsky District

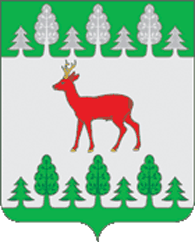
Shablykinsky District

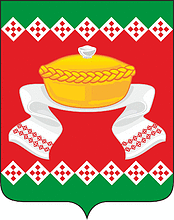
Soskovsky District

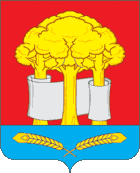
Sverdlovsky District

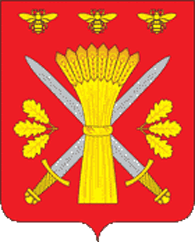
Trosnyansky District

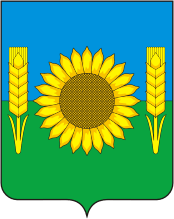
Uritsky District

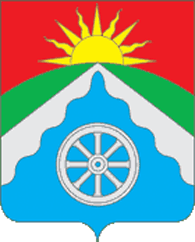
Verkhovsky District

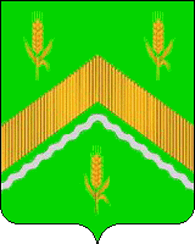
Zalegoshchensky District

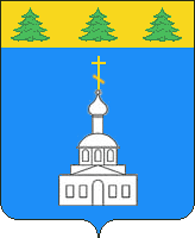
Znamensky District

== Penza Oblast ==
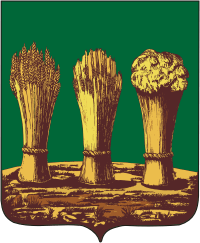
Penza

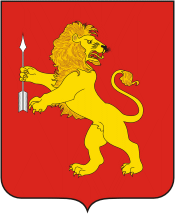
Bashmakovo

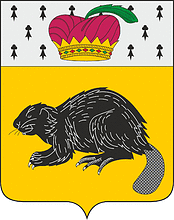
Bekovo

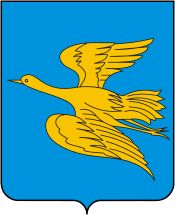
Belinsky

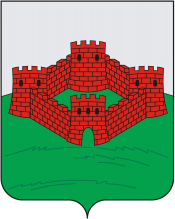
Gorodishche

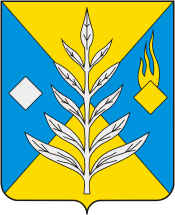
Issa

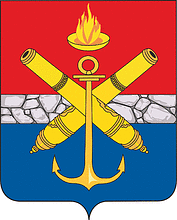
Kamenka

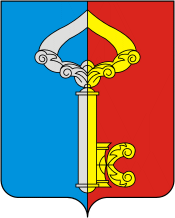
Kolyshley

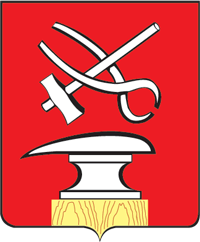
Kuznetsk

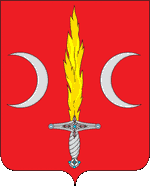
Lunino

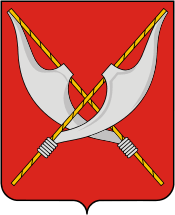
Mokshan

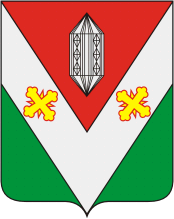
Nikolsk

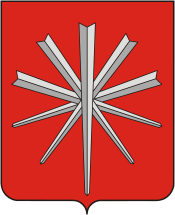
Nizhny Lomov

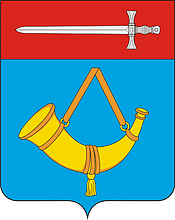
Pachelma

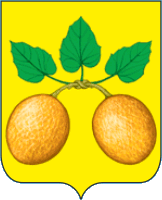
Serdobsk

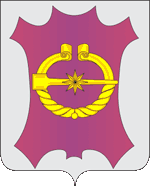
Shemysheyka

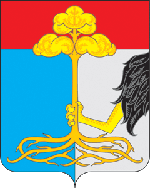
Sosnovoborsk

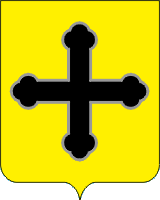
Spassk

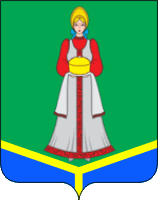
Tamala

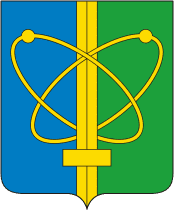
Zarechny

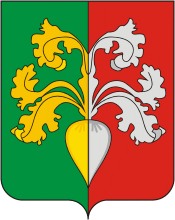
Zemetchino

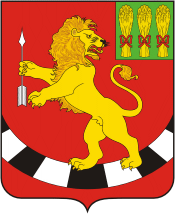
Bashmakovsky District

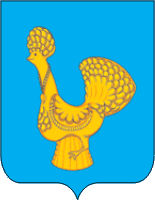
Spassky District

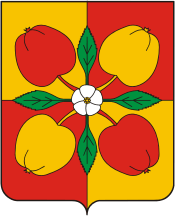
Bekovsky District

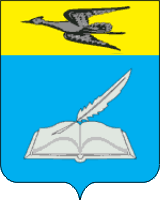
Belinsky District

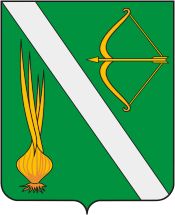
Bessonovsky District

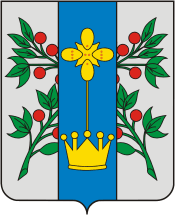
Vadinsky District

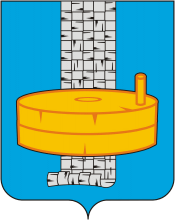
Gorodishchensky District

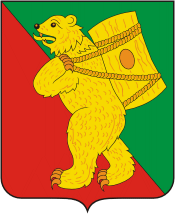
Zemetchinsky District

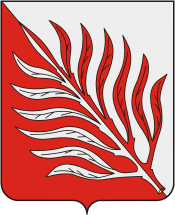
Issinsky District

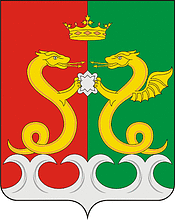
Kamensky District

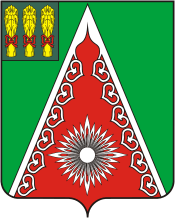
Kameshkirsky District

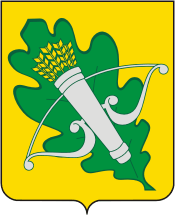
Kolyshleysky District

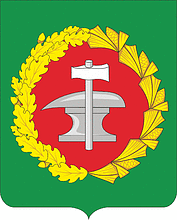
Kuznetsky District

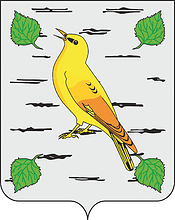
Lopatinsky District

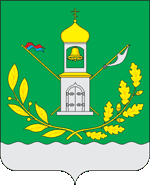
Luninsky District

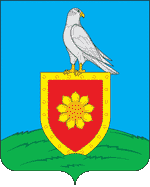
Maloserdobinsky District

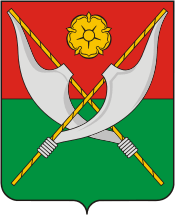
Mokshansky District

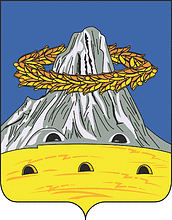
Narovchatsky District

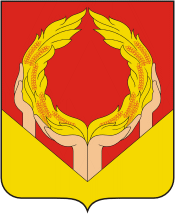
Neverkinsky District

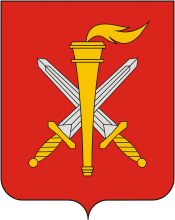
Nizhnelomovsky District

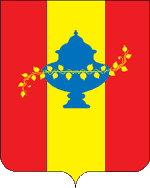
Nikolsky District

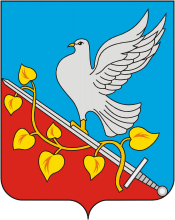
Pachelmsky District

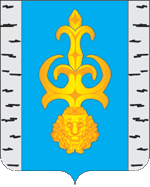
Penzensky District

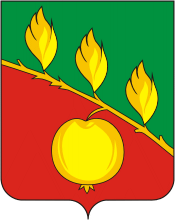
Serdobsky District

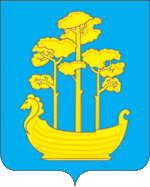
Sosnovoborsky District

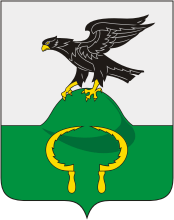
Tamalinsky District

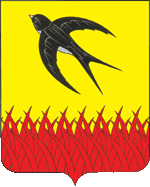
Shemysheysky District

== Pskov Oblast ==
Pskov

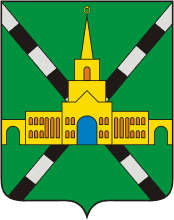
Dno

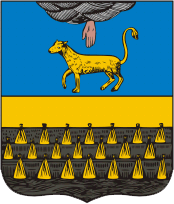
Gdov

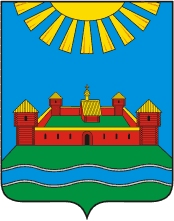
Krasnogorodsk

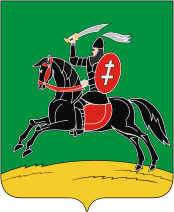
Nevel

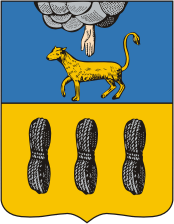
Novorzhev

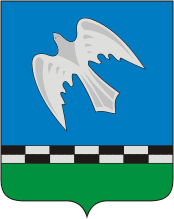
Novosokolniki

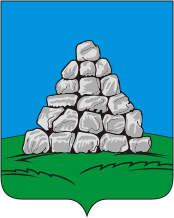
Opochka

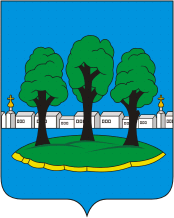
Ostrov

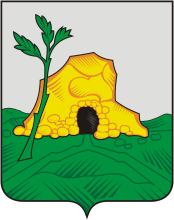
Pechory

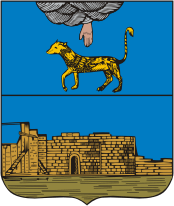
Porkhov

Pustoshka

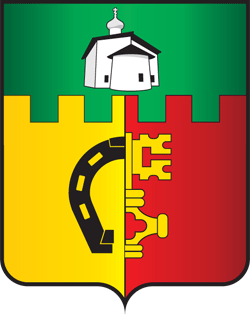
Pytalovo

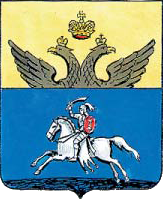
Sebezh

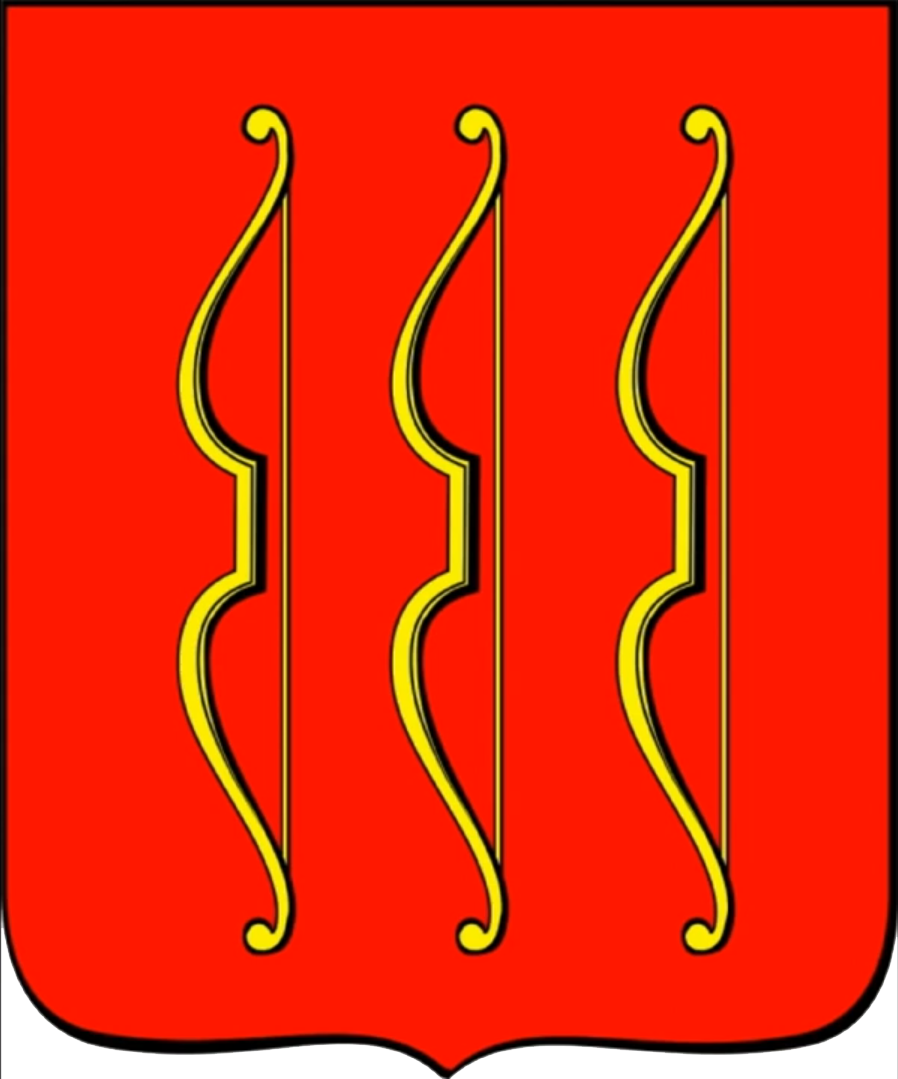
Velikiye Luki

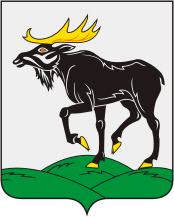
Bezhanitsky District

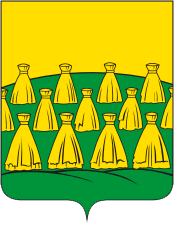
Gdovsky District

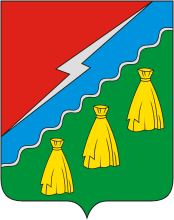
Dedovichsky District

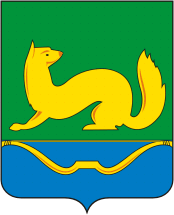
Kunyinsky District

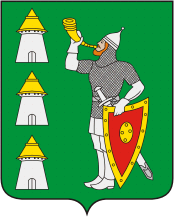
Loknyansky District

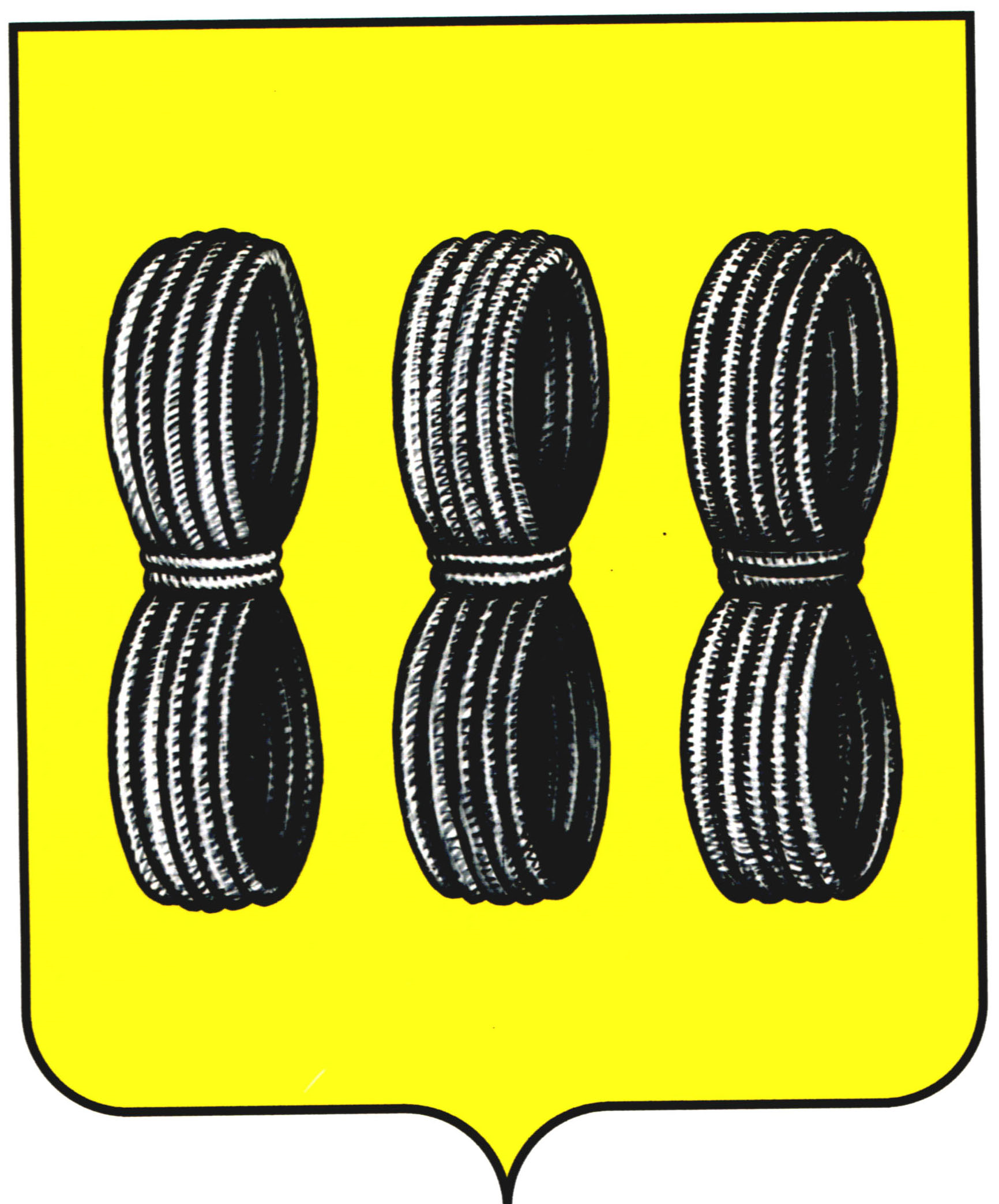
Novorzhevsky District

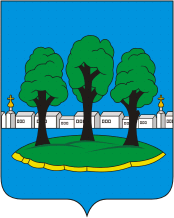
Ostrovsky District

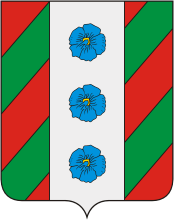
Palkinsky District

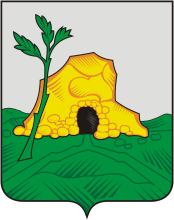
Pechorsky District

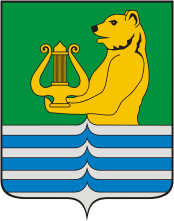
Plyussky District

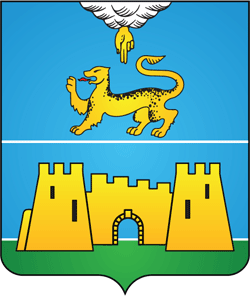
Porkhovsky District

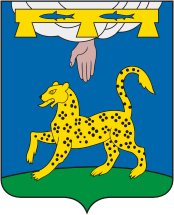
Pskovsky District

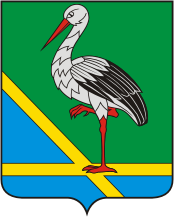
Pustoshkinsky District

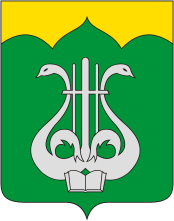
Pushkinogorsky District

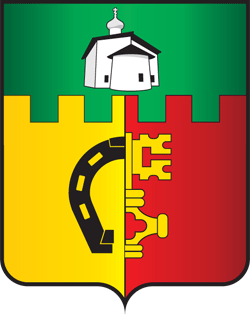
Pytalovsky District

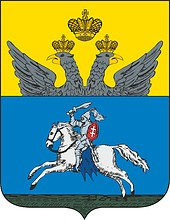
Sebezhsky District

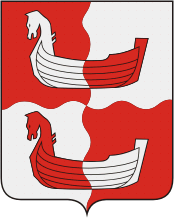
Strugo-Krasnensky District

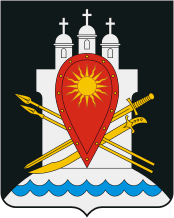
Usvyatsky District

== Rostov Oblast ==
Rostov-on-Don

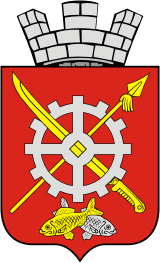
Aksay

Azov

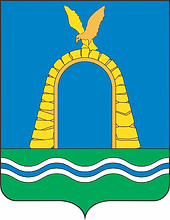
Bataysk

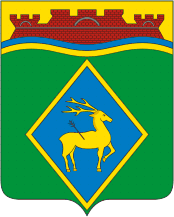
Belaya Kalitva

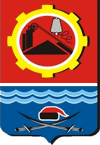
Donetsk

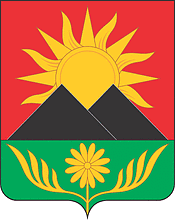
Gukovo

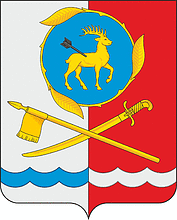
Kamensk-Shakhtinsky

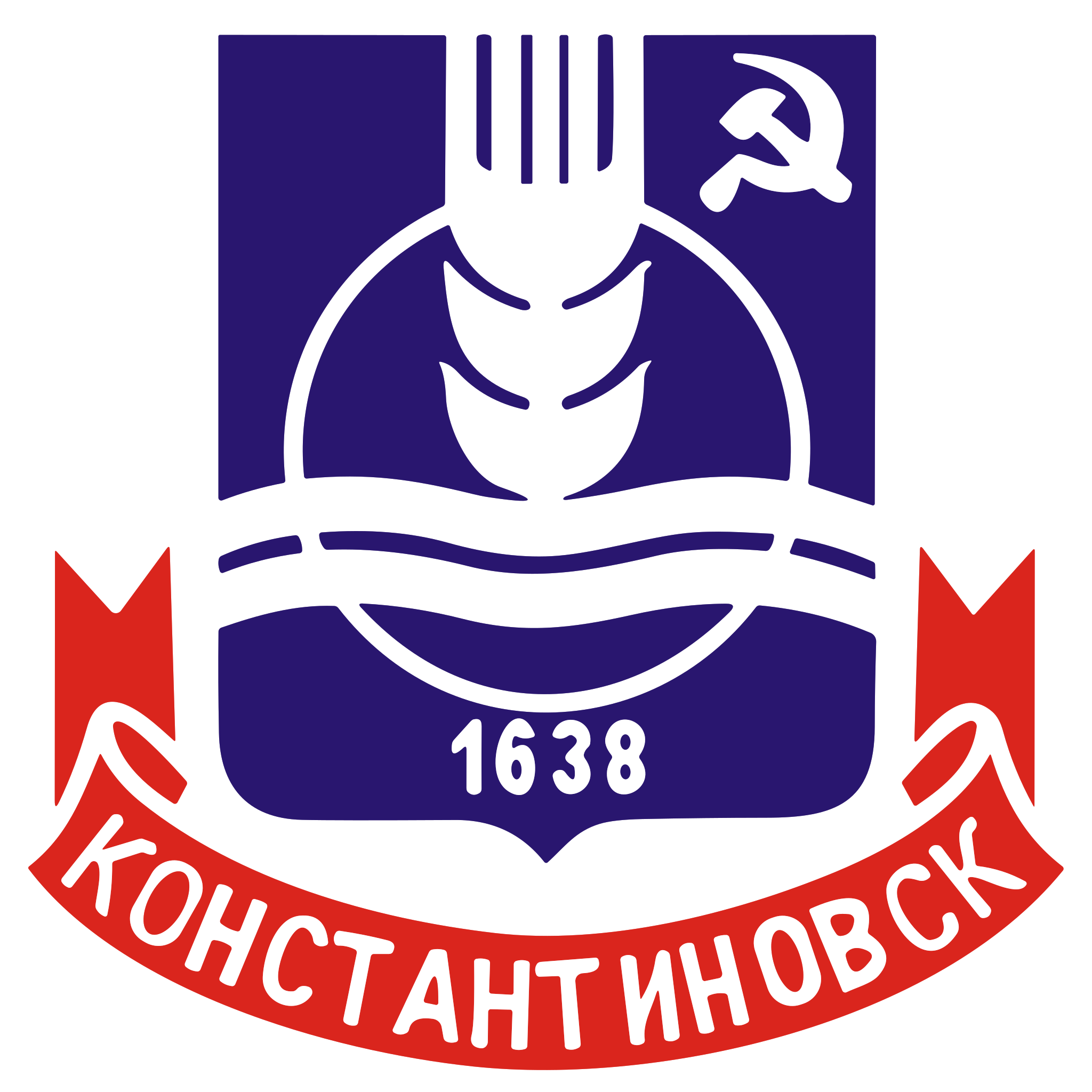
Konstantinovsk

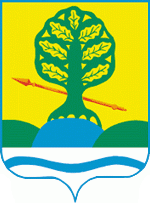
Krasny Sulin

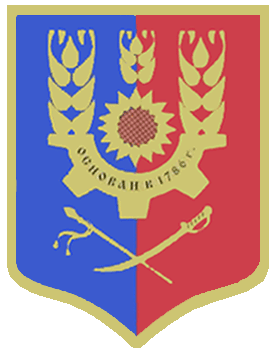
Millerovo

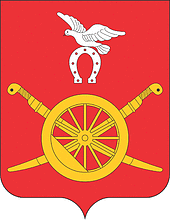
Morozovsk

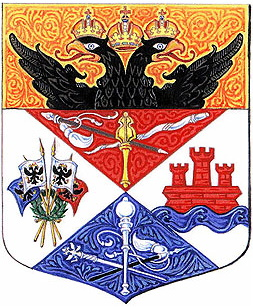
Novocherkassk

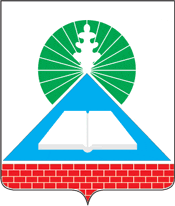
Novoshakhtinsk

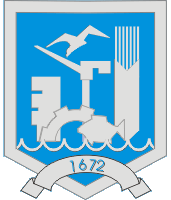
Semikarakorsk

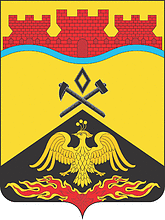
Shakhty

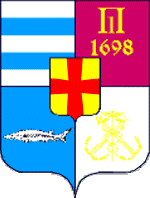
Taganrog

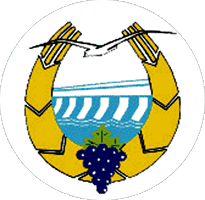
Tsimlyansk

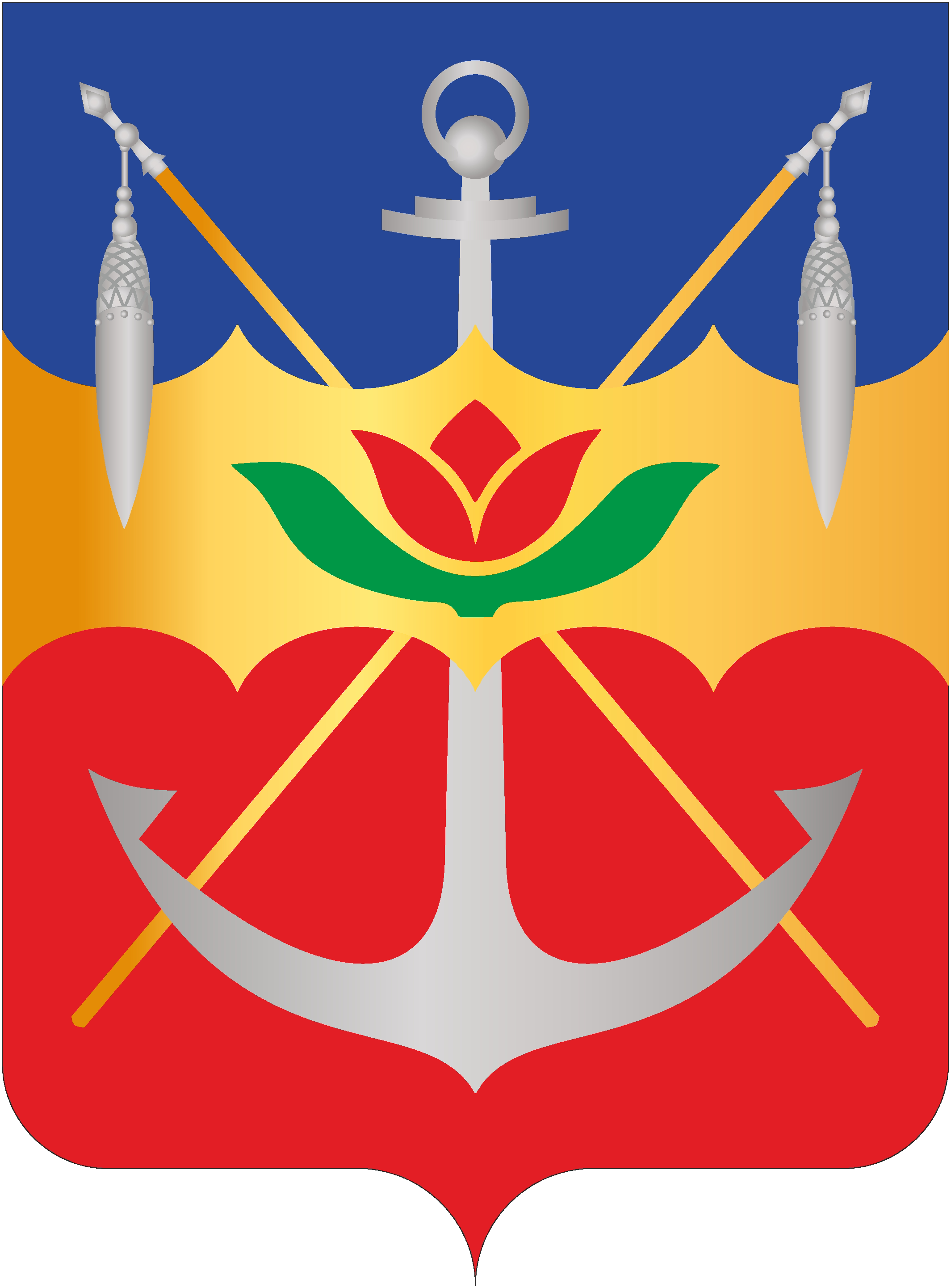
Volgodonsk

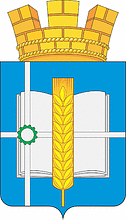
Zernograd

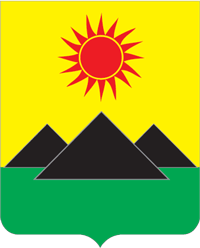
Zverevo

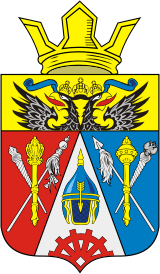
Aksaysky District

Azovsky District

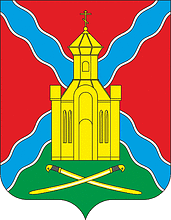
Bagayevsky District

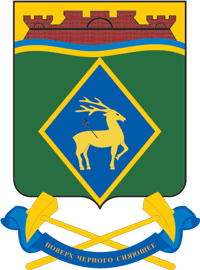
Belokalitvinsky District

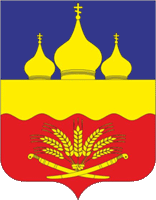
Bokovsky District

Chertkovsky District

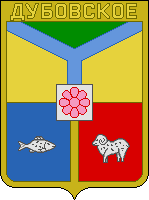
Dubovsky District

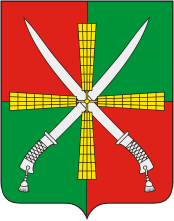
Kagalnitsky District

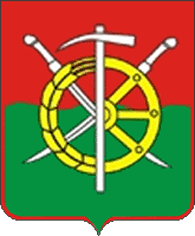
Kamensky District

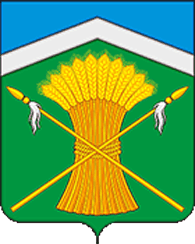
Kasharsky District

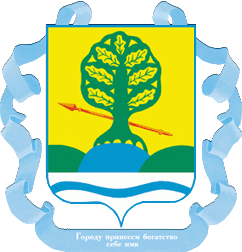
Krasnosulinsky District

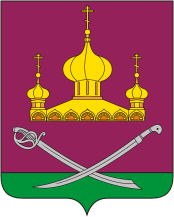
Martynovsky District

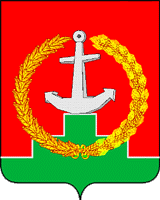
Matveyevo-Kurgansky District

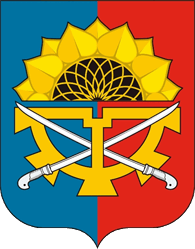
Millerovsky District

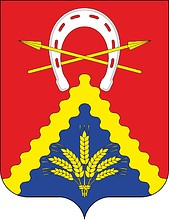
Milyutinsky District

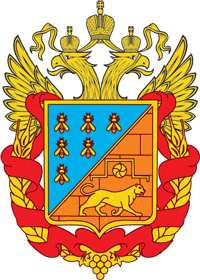
Myasnikovsky District

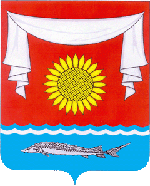
Neklinovsky District

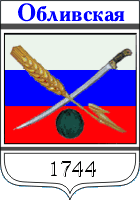
Oblivsky District

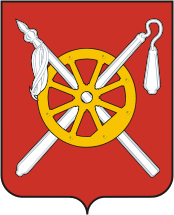
Oktyabrsky District

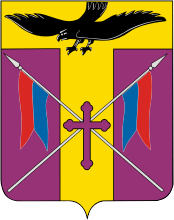
Proletarsky District

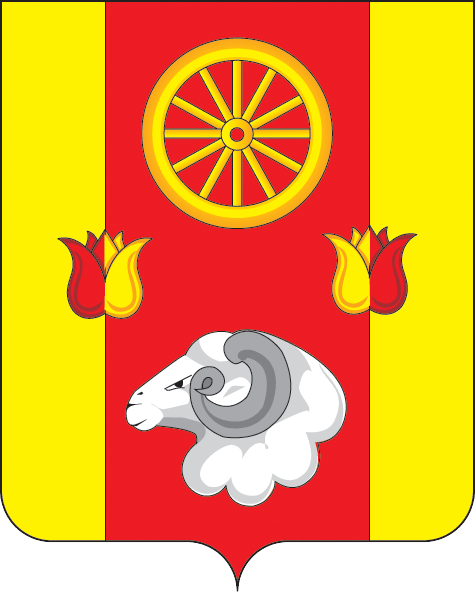
Remontnensky District

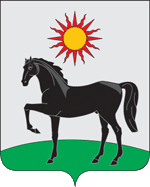
Tselinsky District

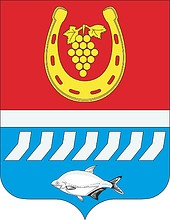
Tsimlyansky District

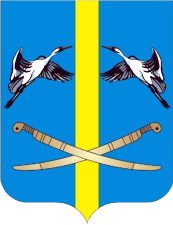
Verkhnedonskoy District

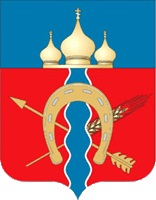
Vesyolovsky District

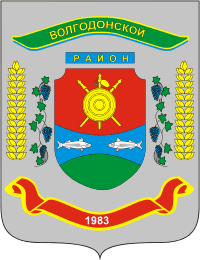
Volgodonskoy District

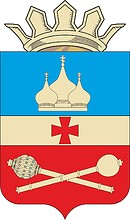
Yegorlyksky District

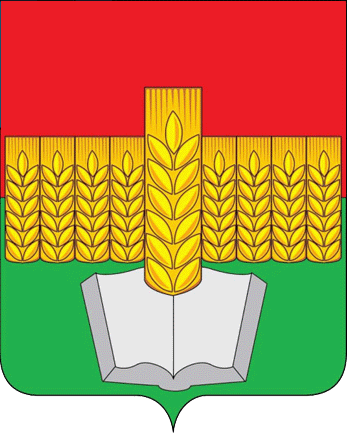
Zernogradsky District

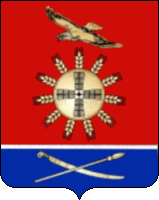
Zimovnikovsky District

== Ryazan Oblast ==
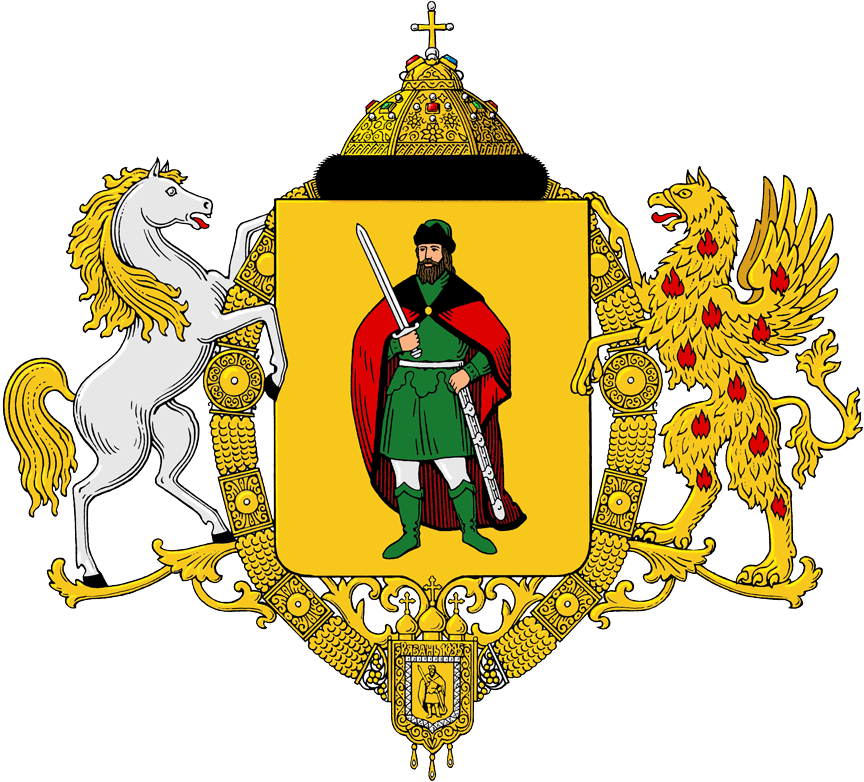
Ryazan

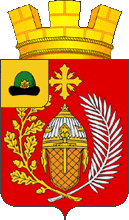
Alexandro-Nevsky

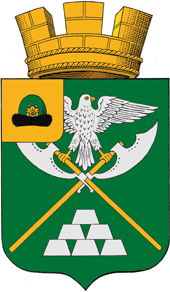
Chuchkovo

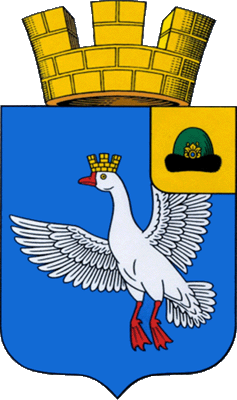
Gus-Zhelezny

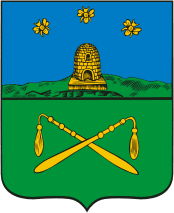
Kadom

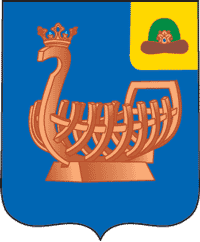
Kasimov

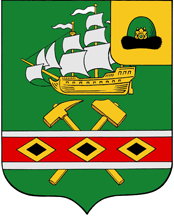
Korablino

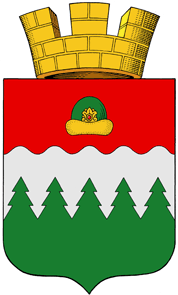
Lesnoy

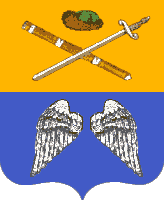
Mikhaylov

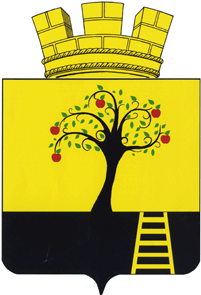
Miloslavskoye

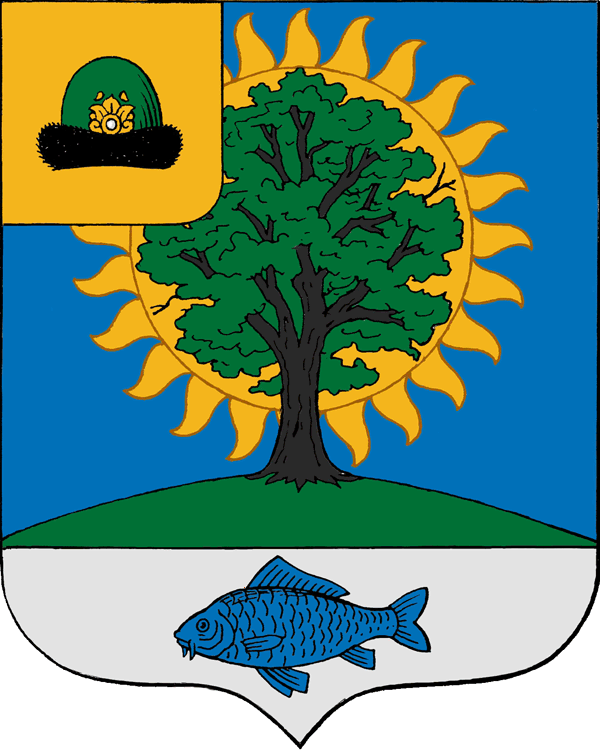
Novomichurinsk

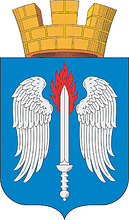
Oktyabrsky

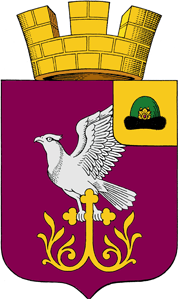
Pavelets

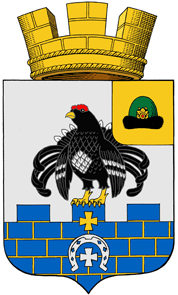
Pitelino

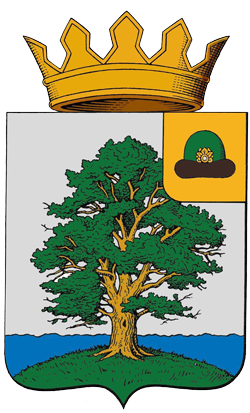
Pronsk

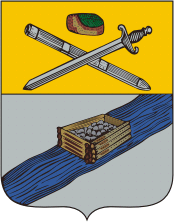
Ryazhsk

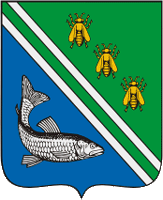
Rybnoye

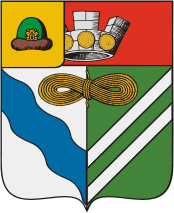
Sasovo

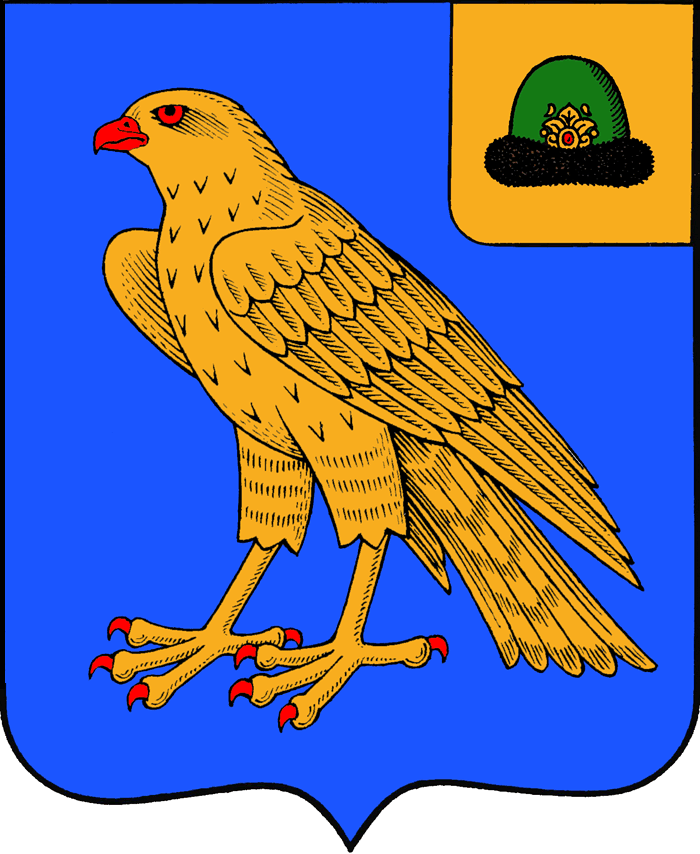
Sapozhok

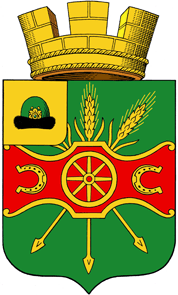
Sarai

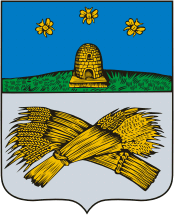
Shatsk

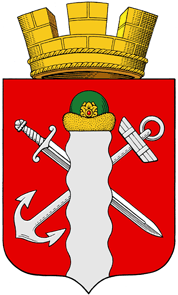
Shilovo

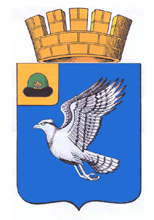
Skopin

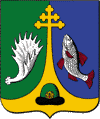
Spas-Klepiki

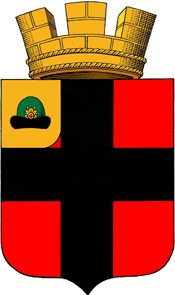
Spassk-Ryazansky

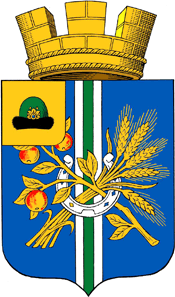
Starozhilovo

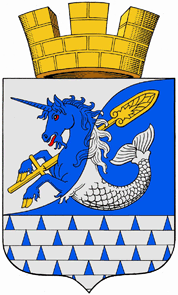
Syntul

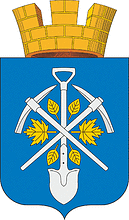
Tsentralny

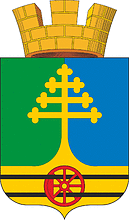
Tuma

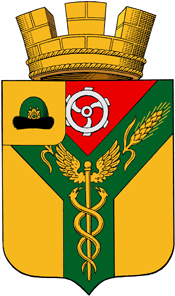
Ukholovo

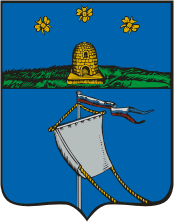
Yelatma

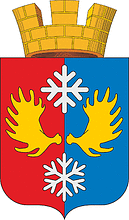
Yermish

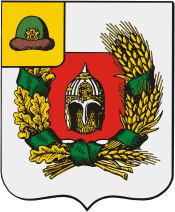
Alexandro-Nevsky District

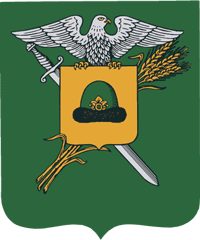
Chuchkovsky District

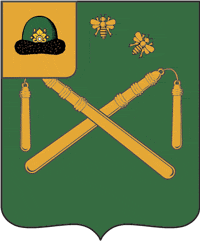
Kadomsky District

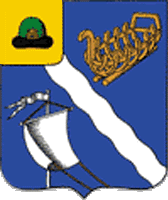
Kasimovsky District

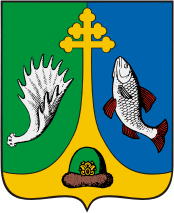
Klepikovsky District

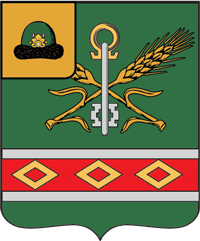
Korablinsky District

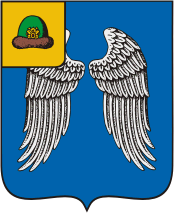
Mikhaylovsky District

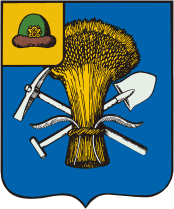
Miloslavsky District

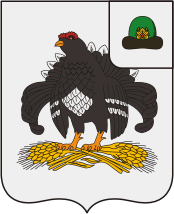
Pitelinsky District

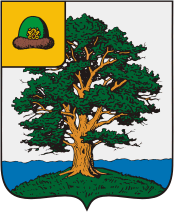
Pronsky District

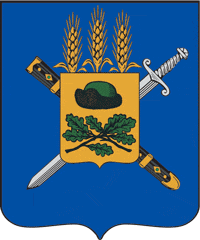
Putyatinsky District

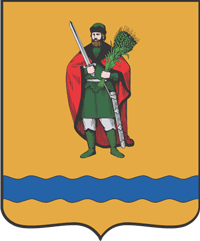
Ryazansky District

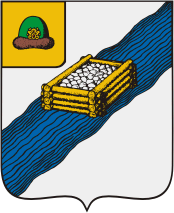
Ryazhsky District

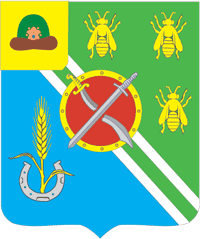
Rybnovsky District

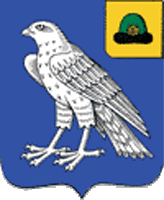
Sapozhkovsky District

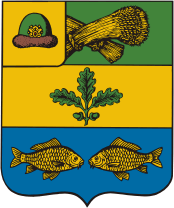
Sarayevsky District

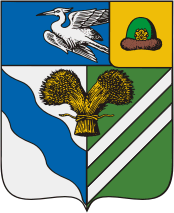
Sasovsky District

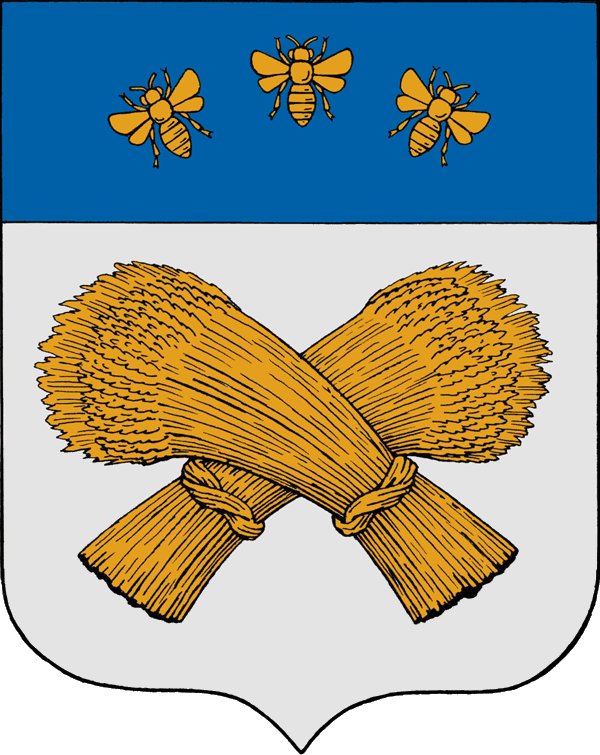
Shatsky District

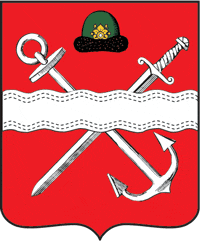
Shilovsky District

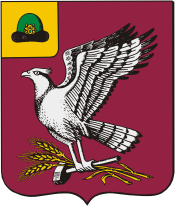
Skopinsky District

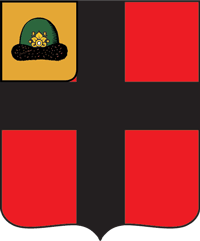
Spassky District

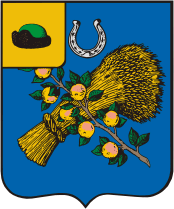
Starozhilovsky District

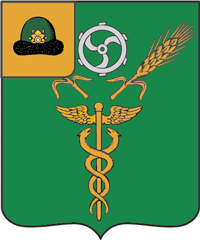
Ukholovsky District

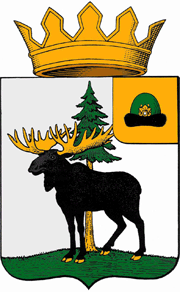
Yermishinsky District

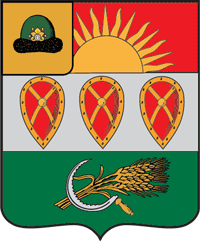
Zakharovsky District

== Sakhalin Oblast ==
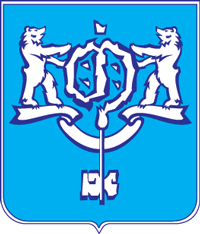
Yuzhno-Sakhalinsk

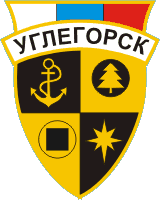
Uglegorsk

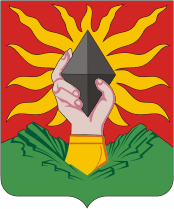
Vakhrushev

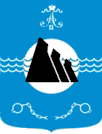
Alexandrovsk-Sakhalinsky District

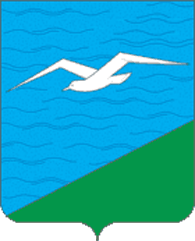
Anivsky District

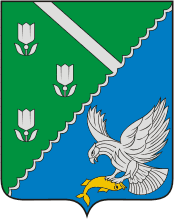
Dolinsky District

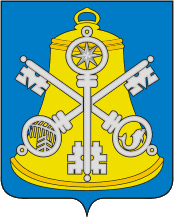
Korsakovsky District

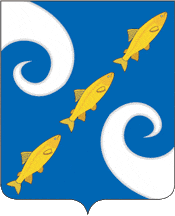
Kurilsky District

Makarovsky District

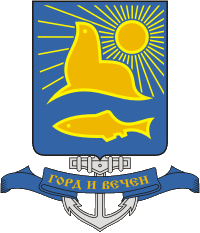
Nevelsky District

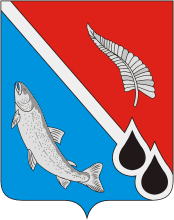
Nogliksky District

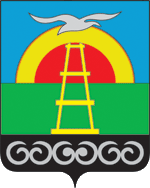
Okhinsky District

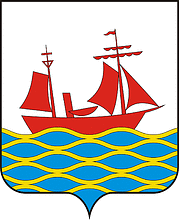
Poronaysky District

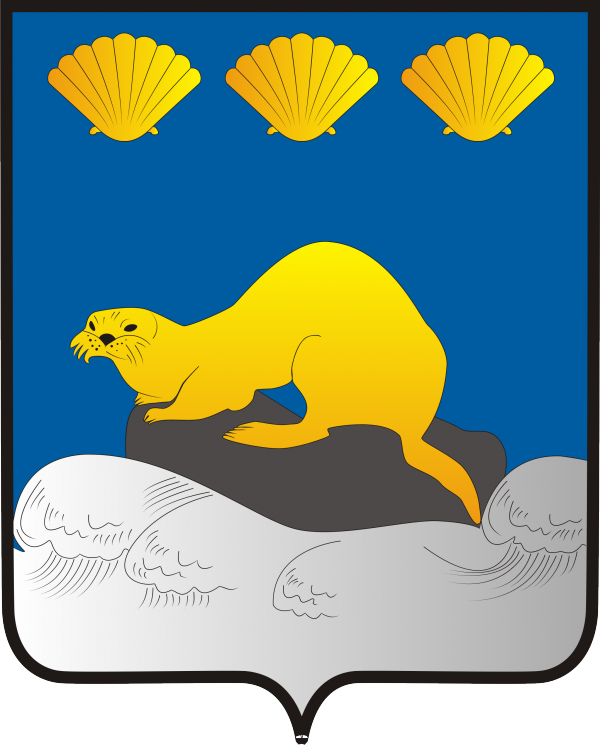
Severo-Kurilsky District

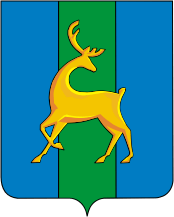
Smirnykhovsky District

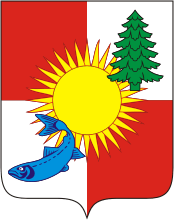
Tomarinsky District

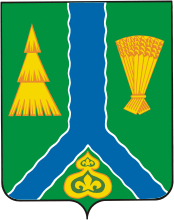
Tymovsky District

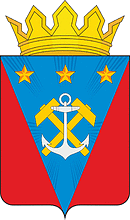
Uglegorsky District

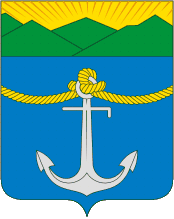
Kholmsky District

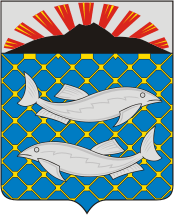
Yuzhno-Kurilsky District

== Samara Oblast ==
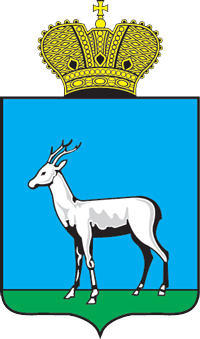
Samara

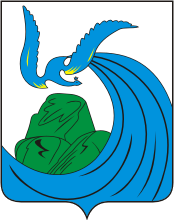
Zhigulyovsk

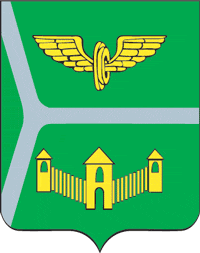
Kinel

Mirny

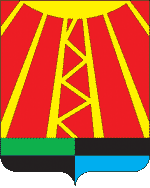
Neftegorsk

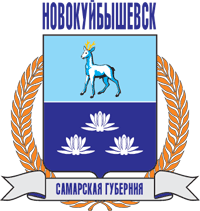
Novokuybyshevsk

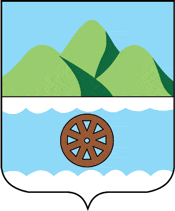
Oktyabrsk

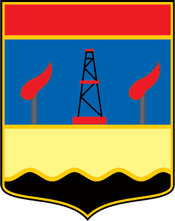
Otradny

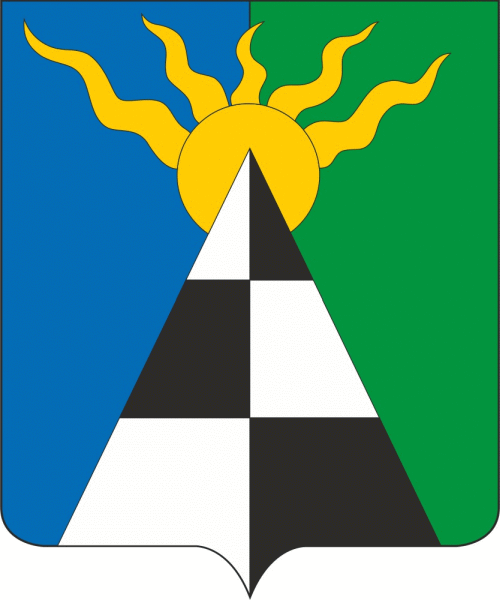
Pokhvistnevo

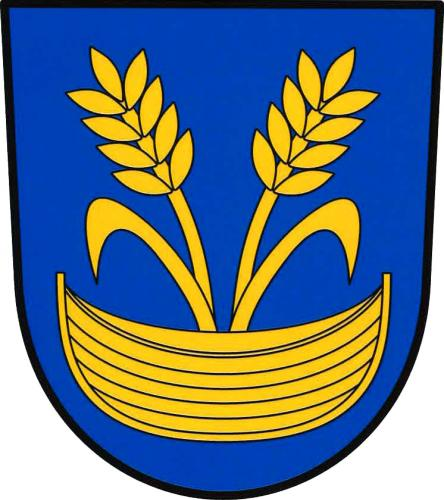
Sukhodol

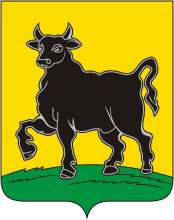
Syzran

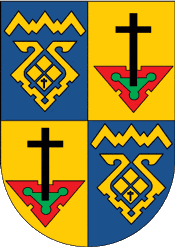
Tolyatti

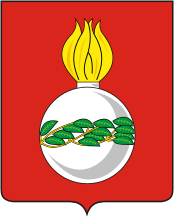
Chapayevsk

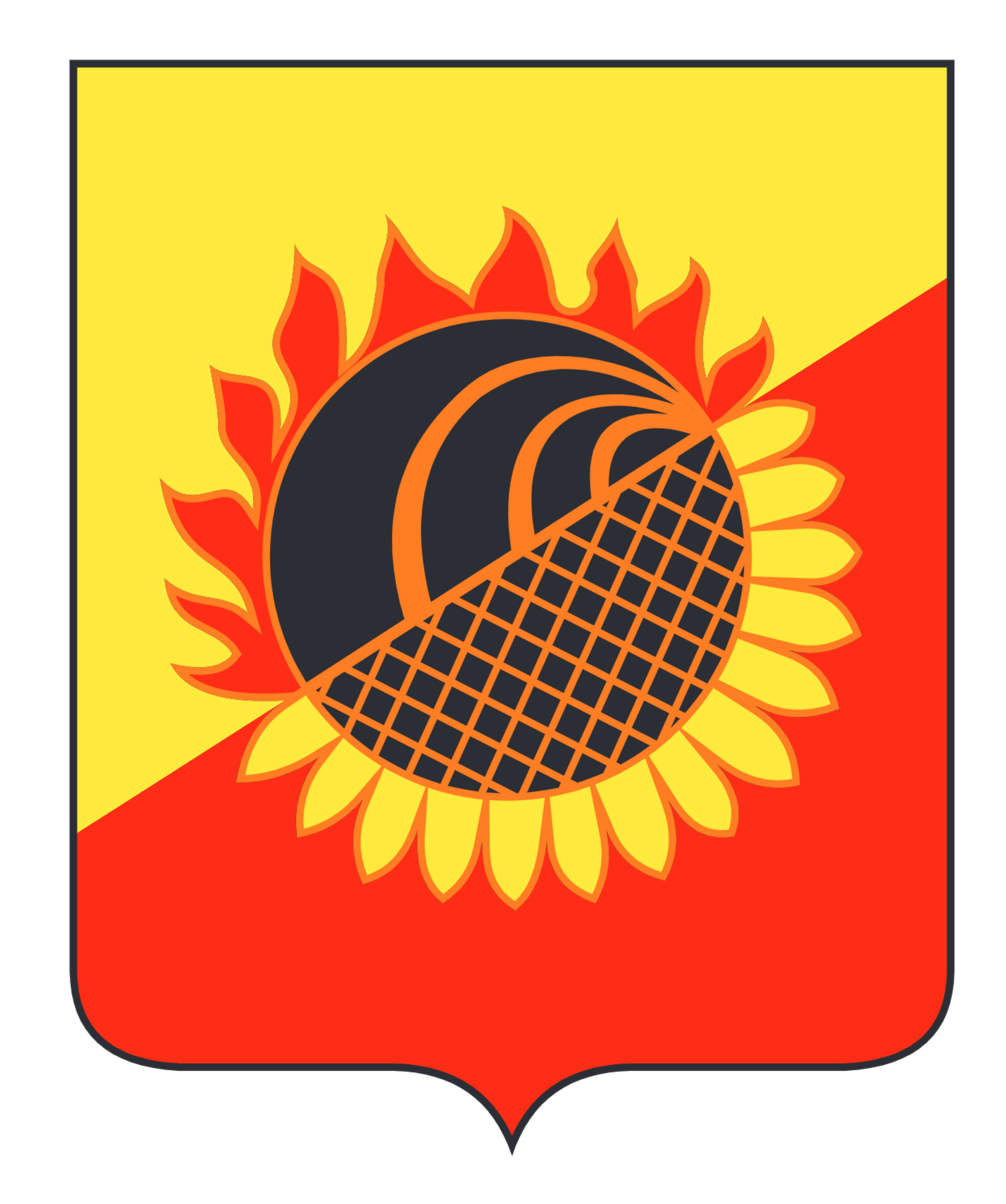
Alexeyevsky District

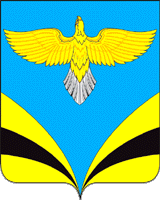
Bezenchuksky District

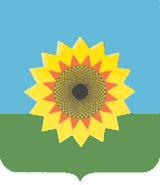
Bogatovsky District

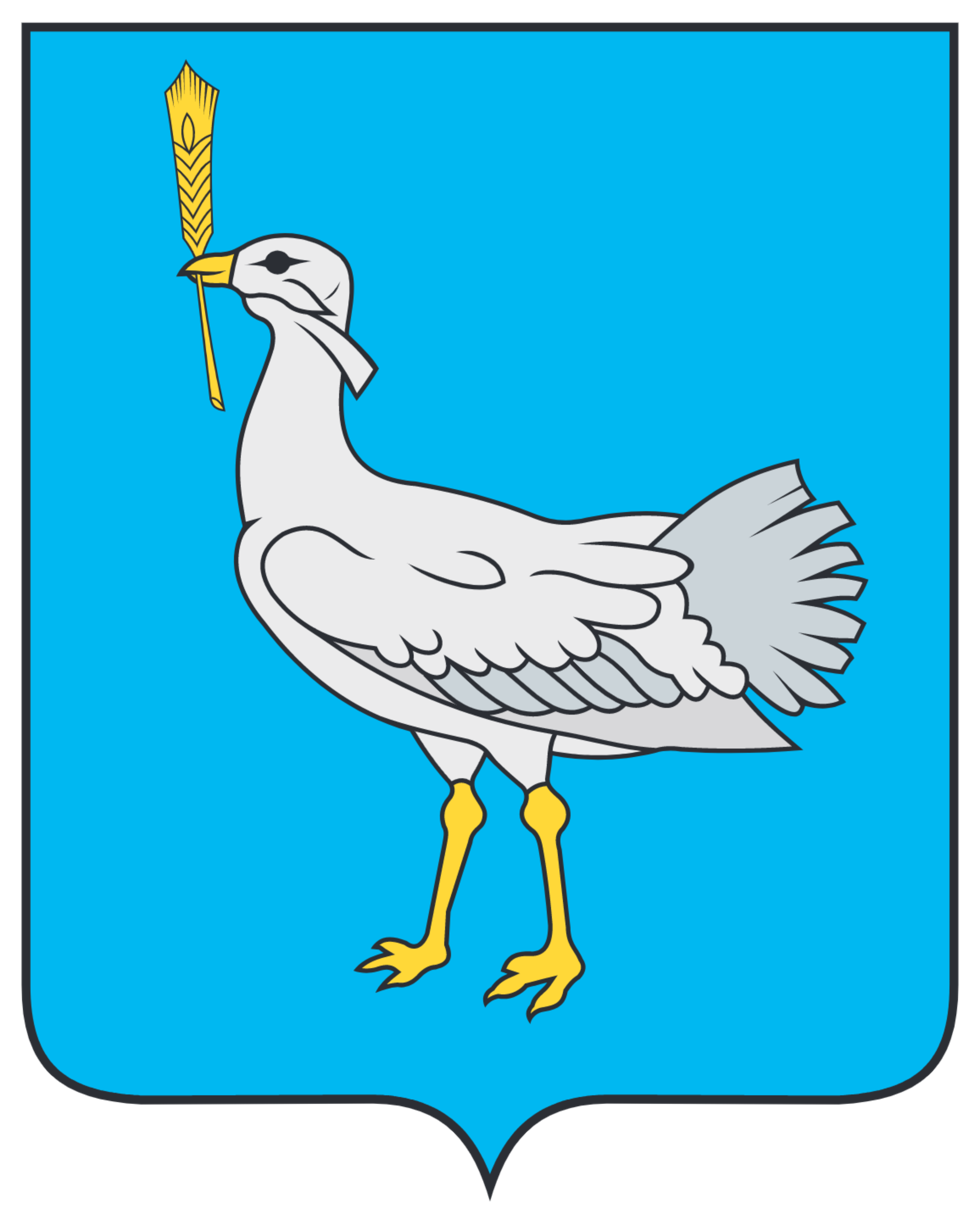
Bolsheglushitsky District

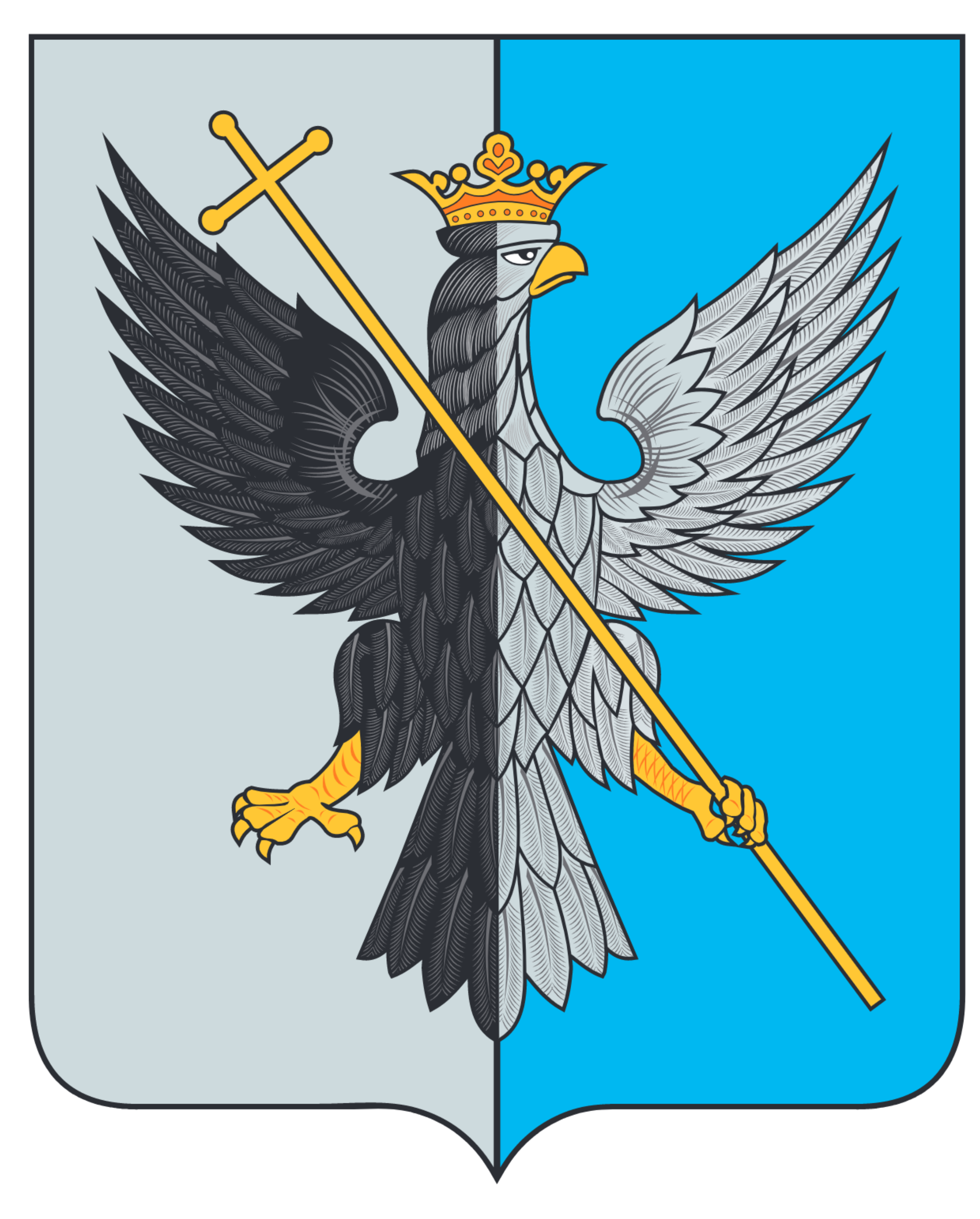
Bolshechernigovsky District

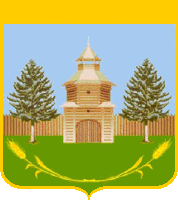
Borsky District

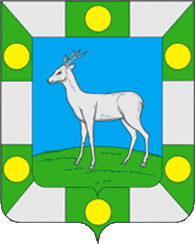
Volzhsky District

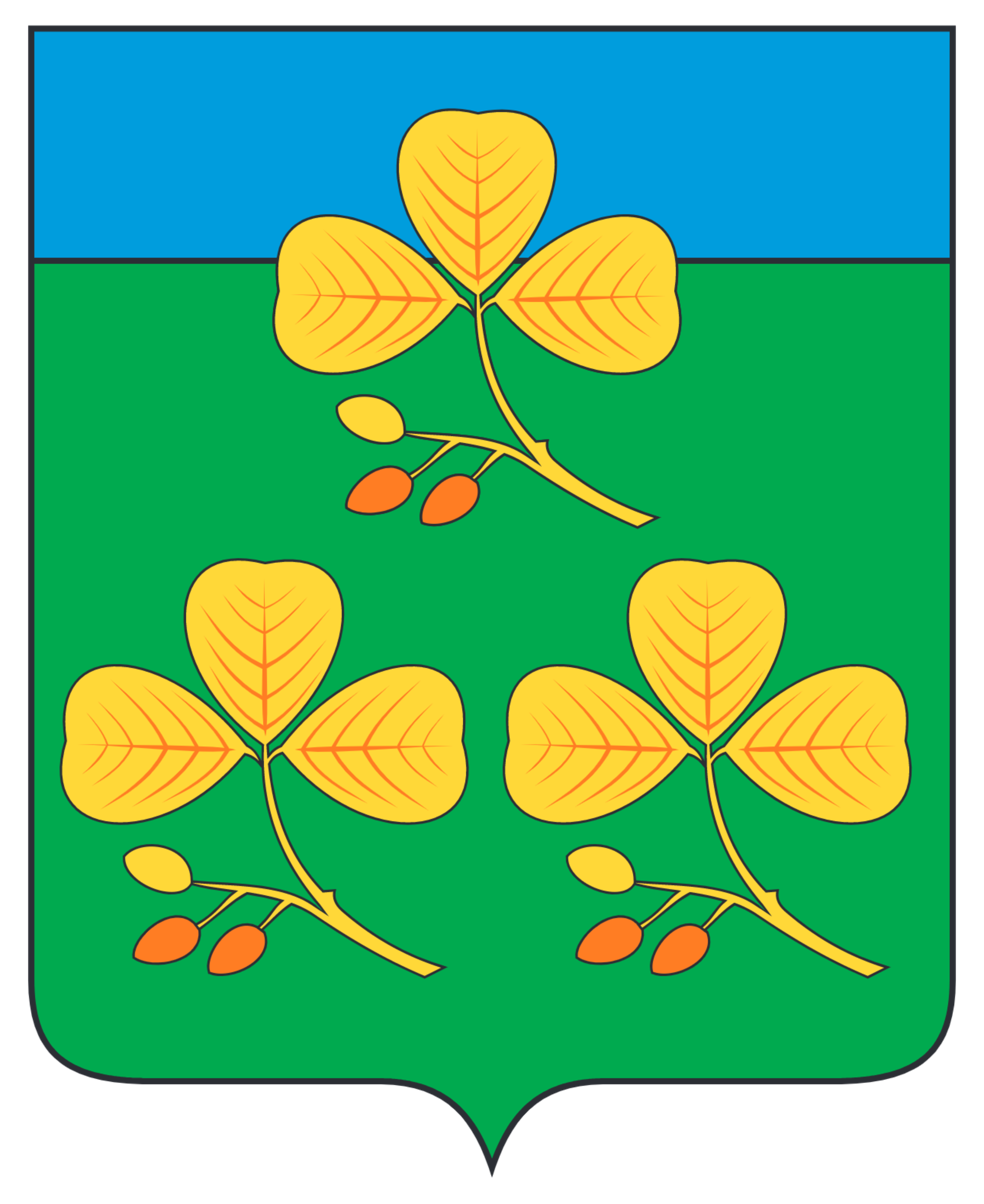
Yelkhovsky District

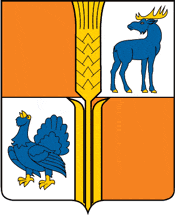
Isaklinsky District

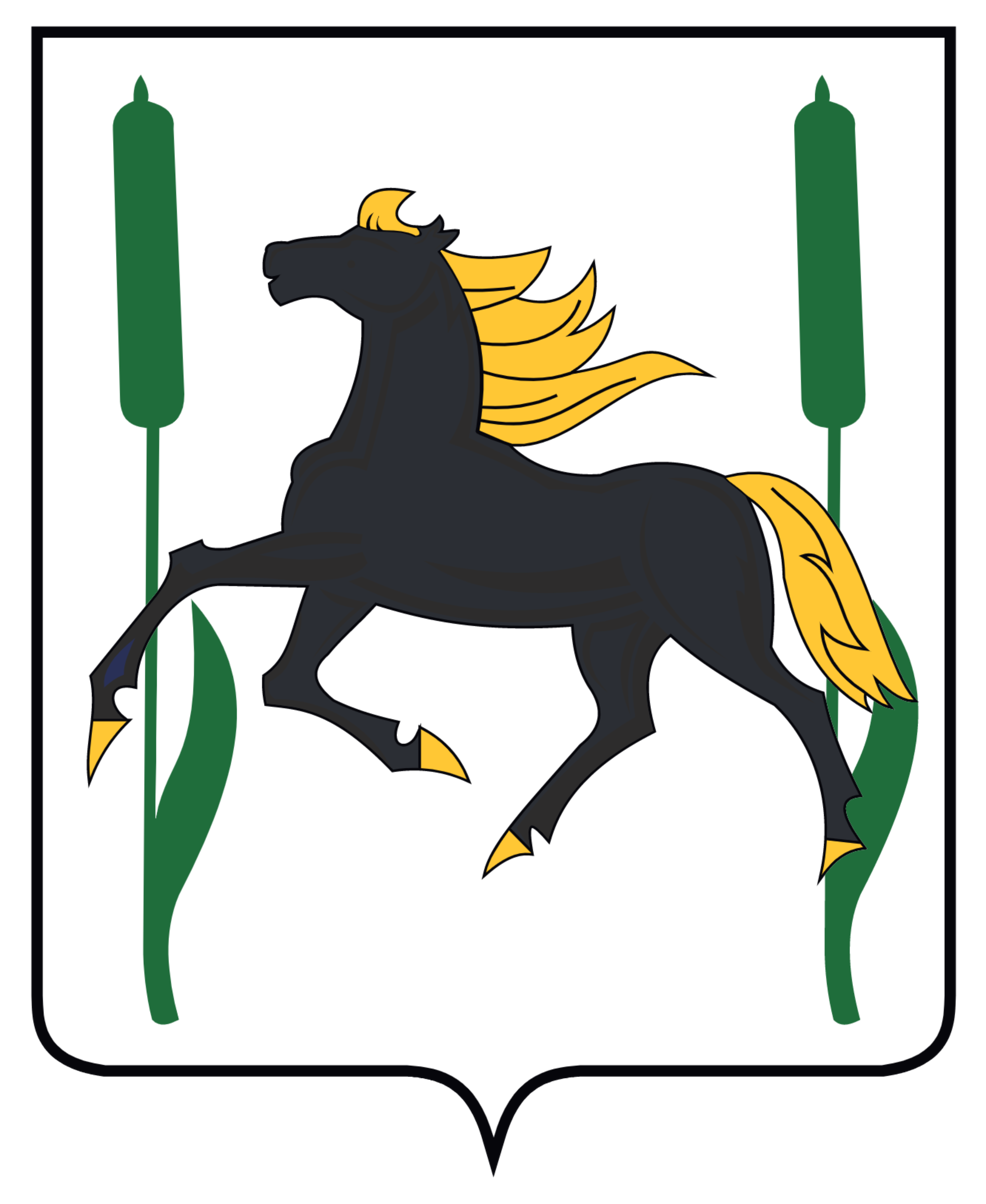
Kamyshlinsky District

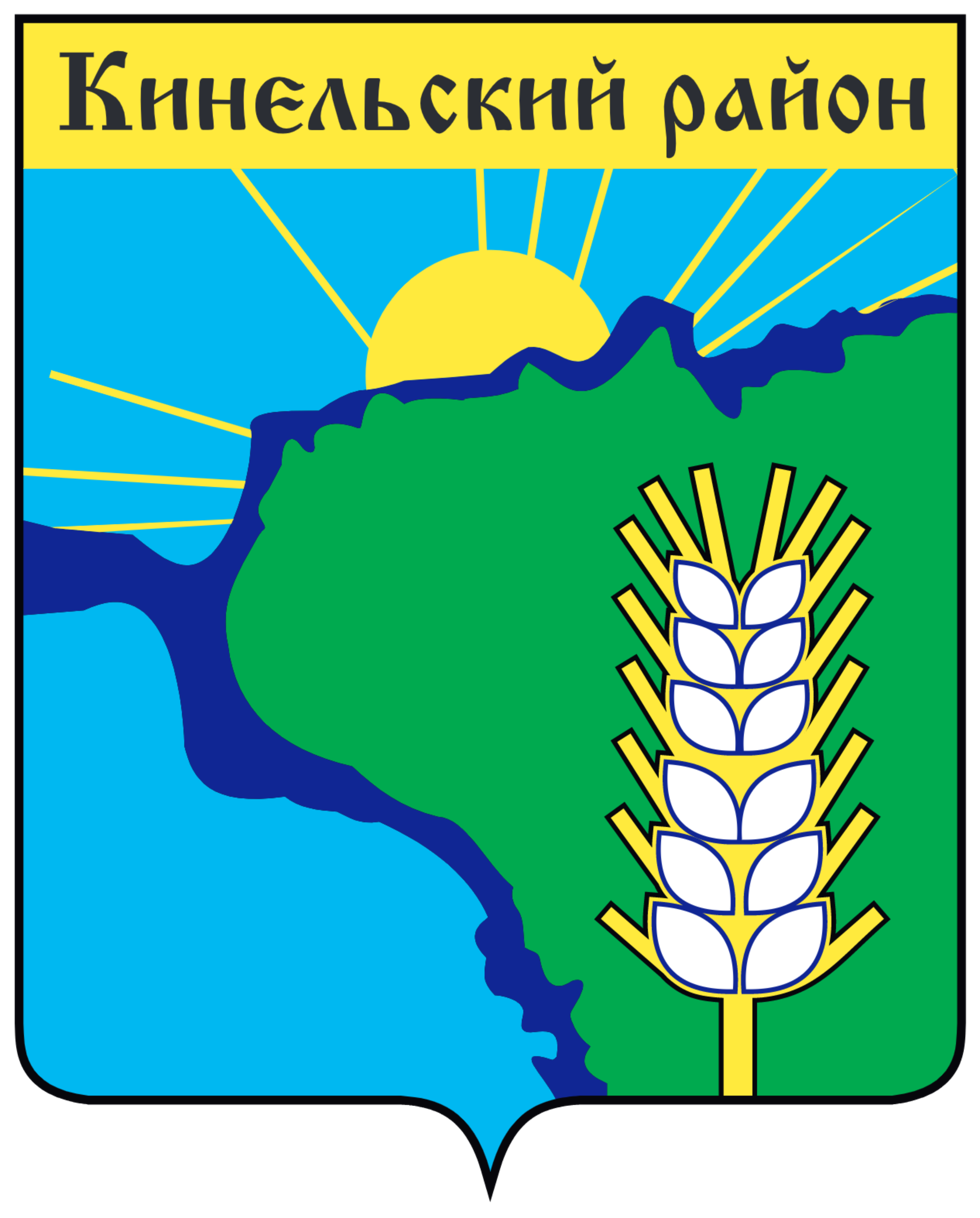
Kinelsky District

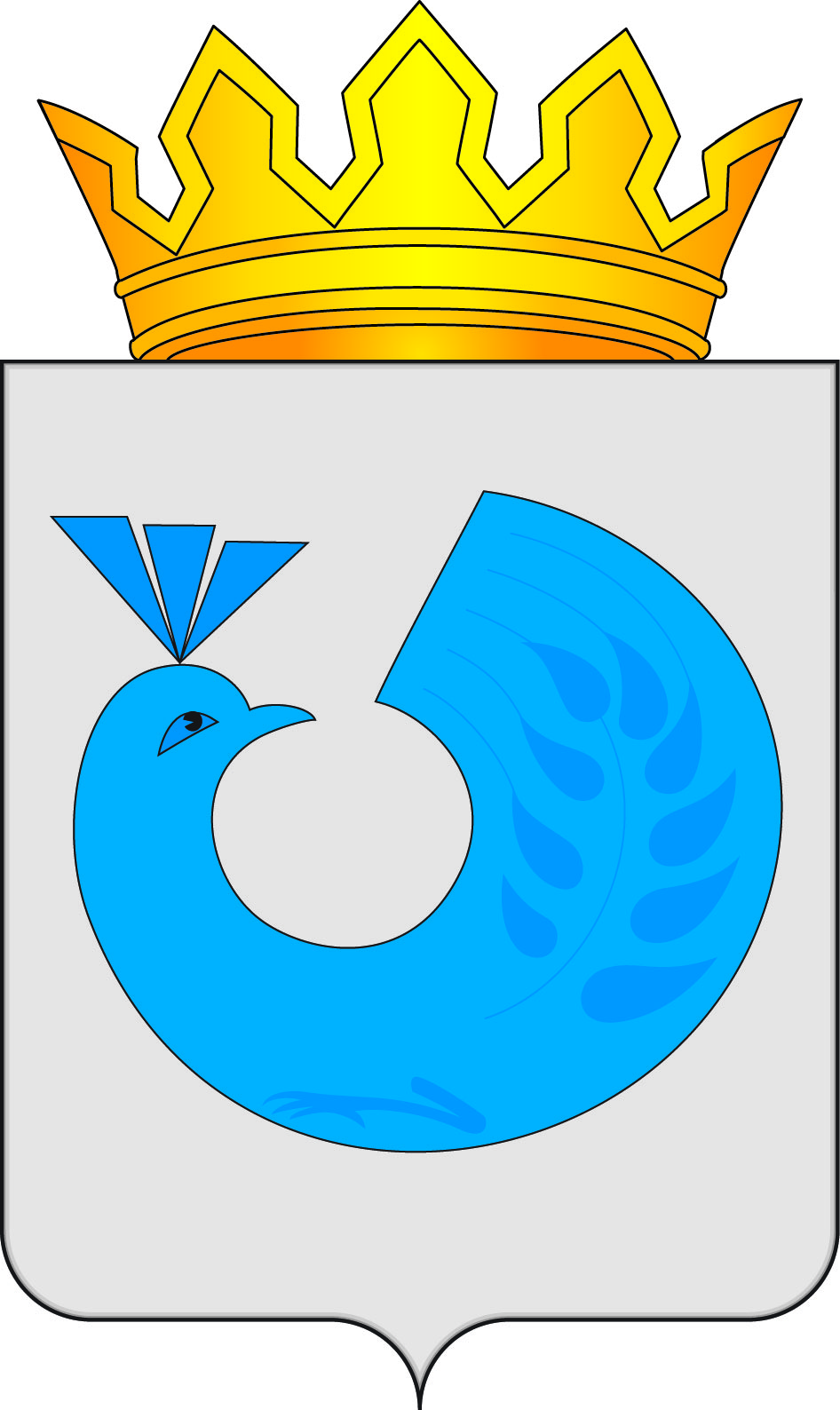
Kinel-Cherkassky District

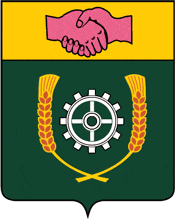
Klyavlinsky District

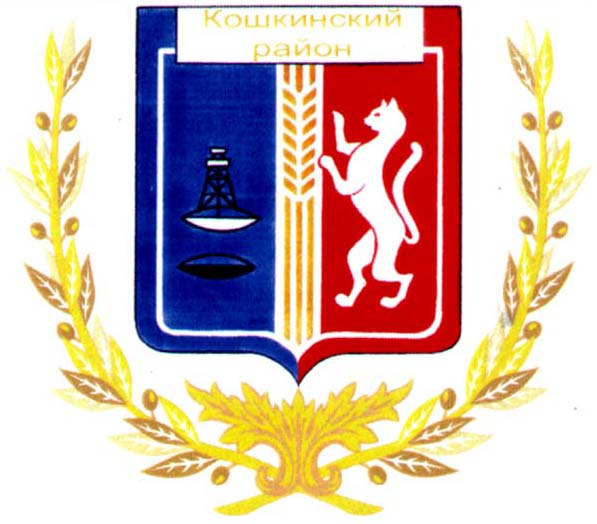
Koshkinsky District

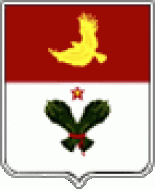
Krasnoarmeysky District

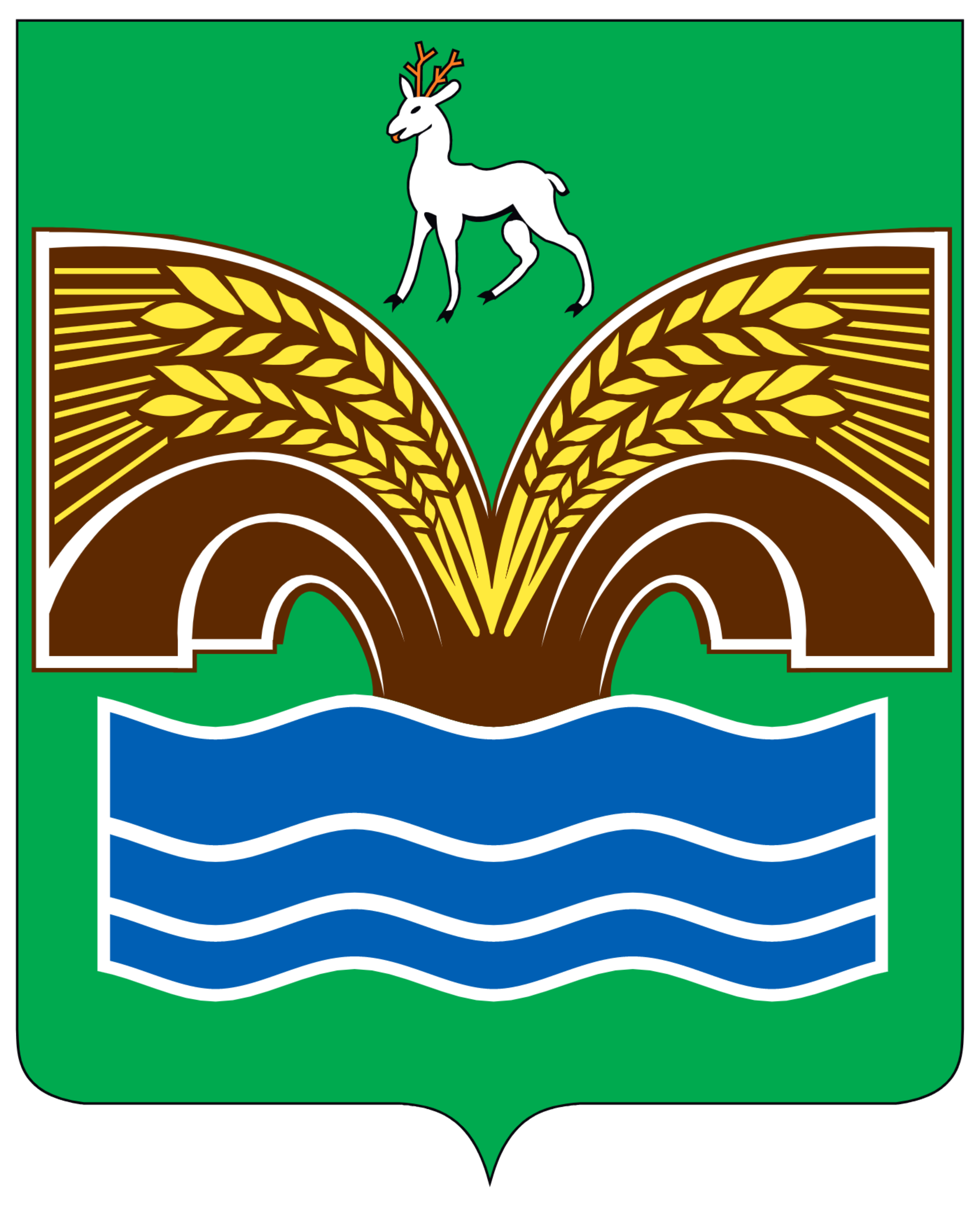
Krasnoyarsky District

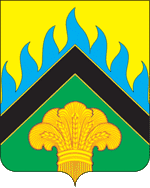
Neftegorsky District

Pestravsky District

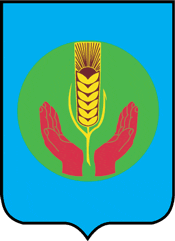
Pokhvistnevsky District

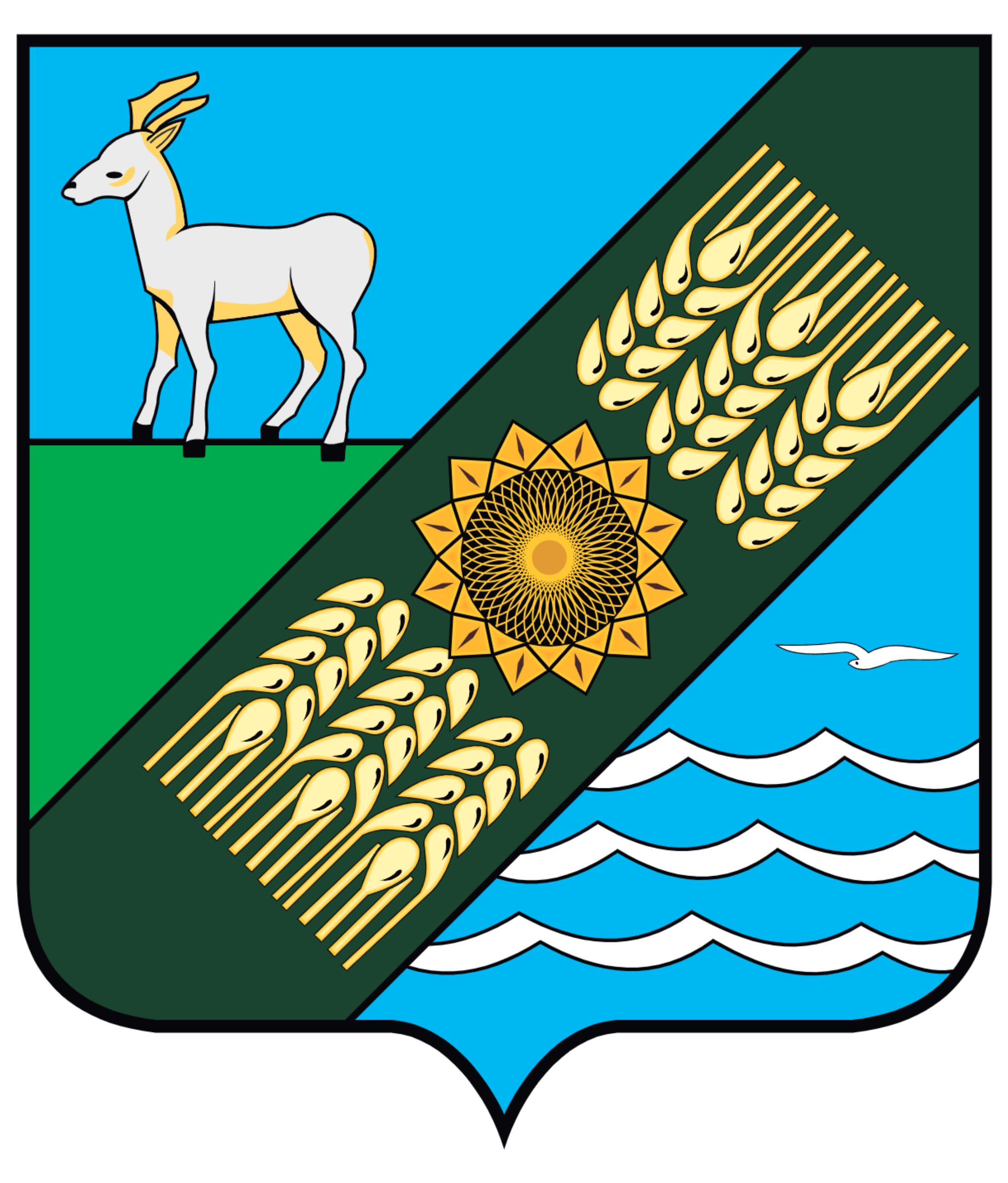
Privolzhsky District

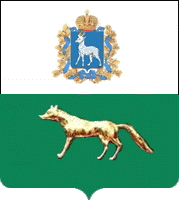
Sergiyevsky District

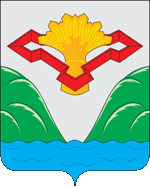
Stavropolsky District

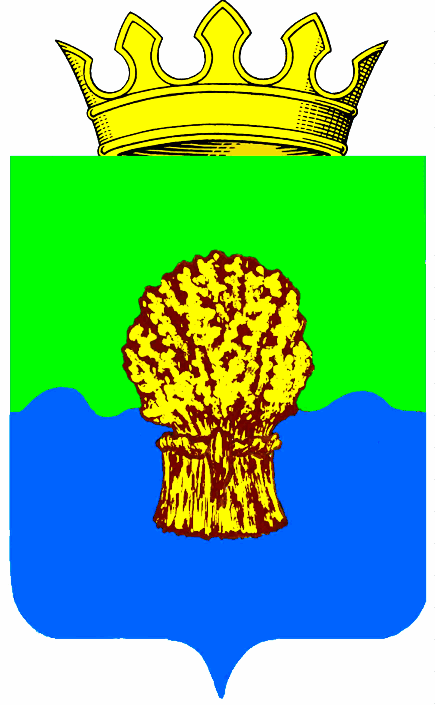
Syzransky District

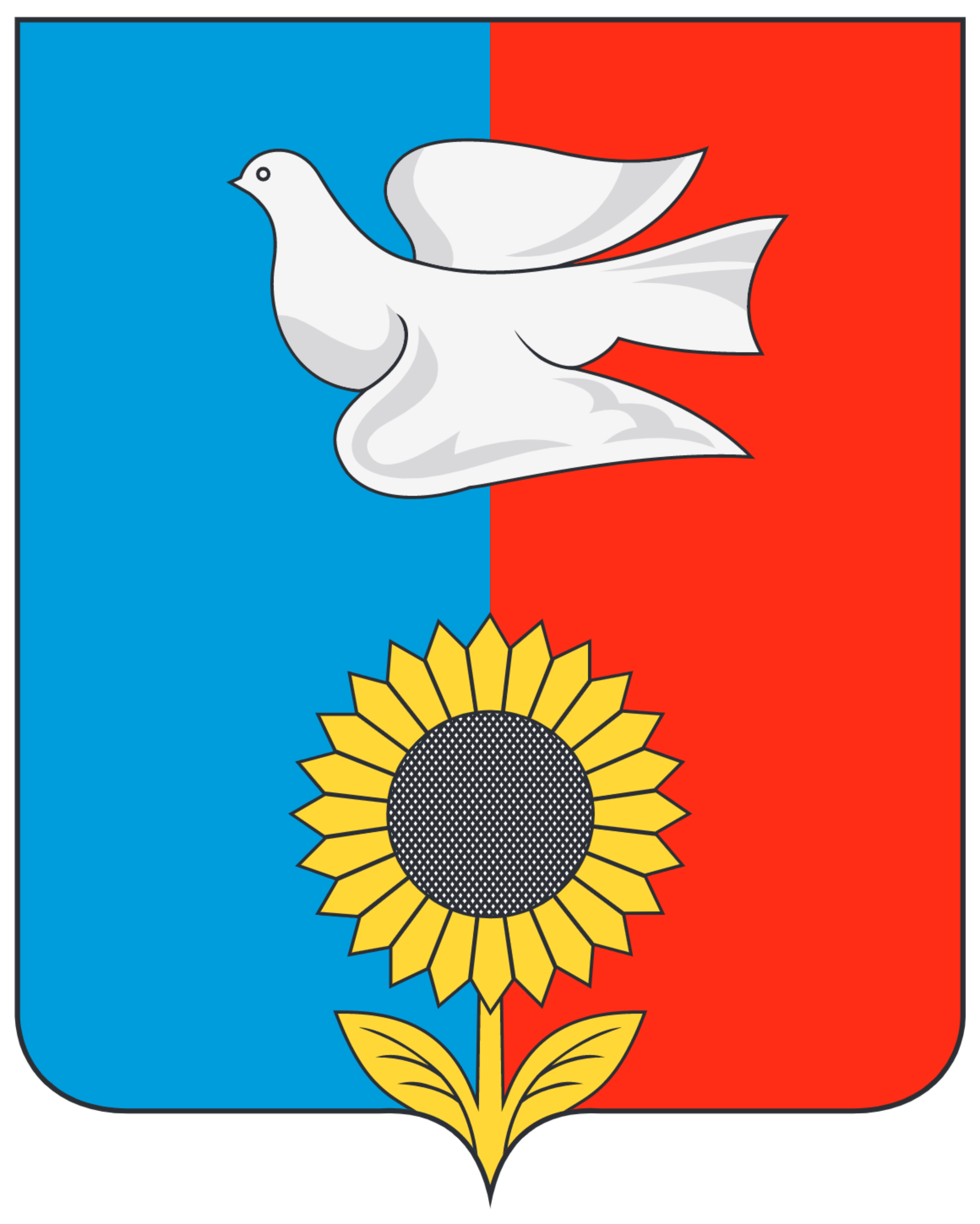
Khvorostyansky District

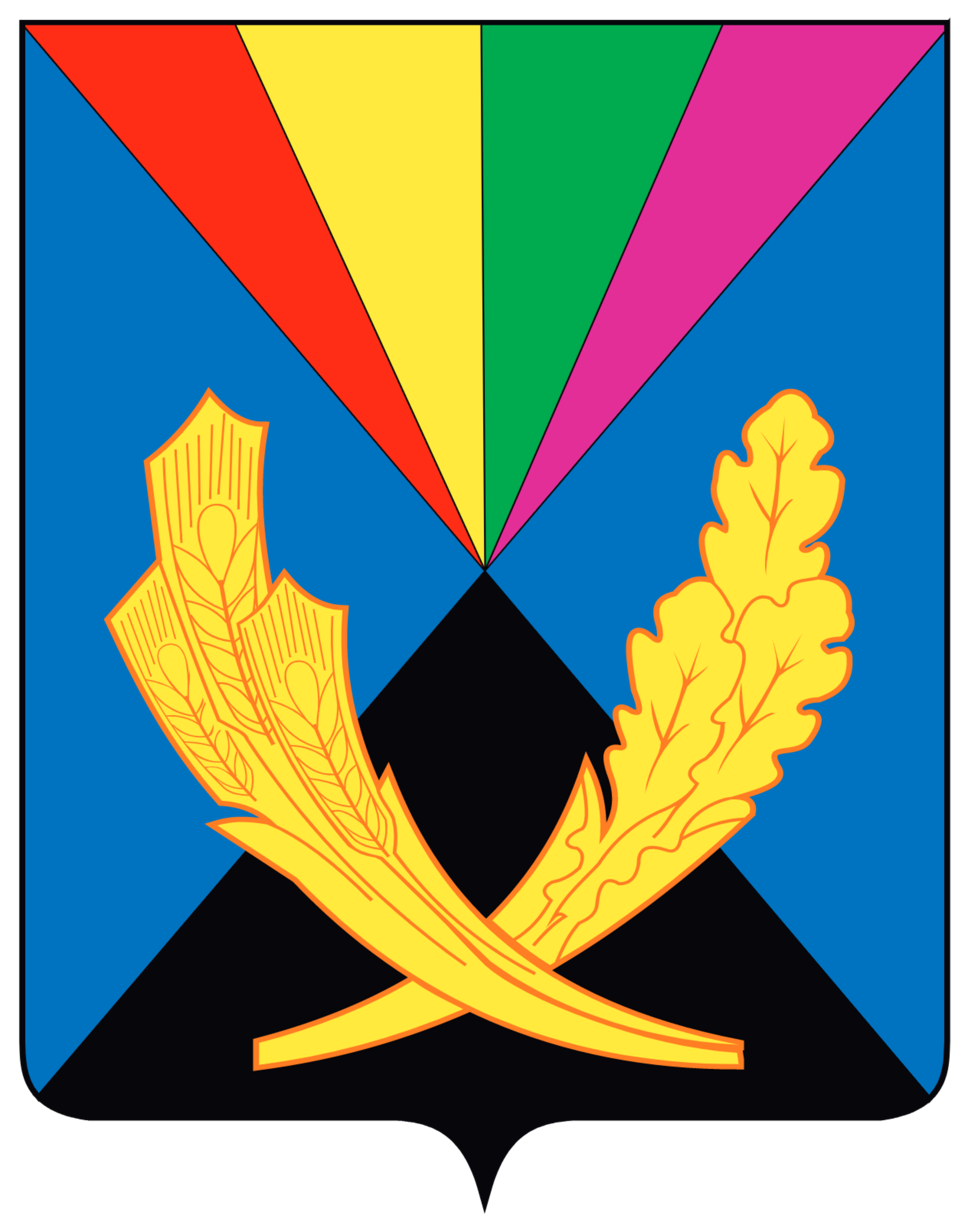
Chelno-Vershinsky District

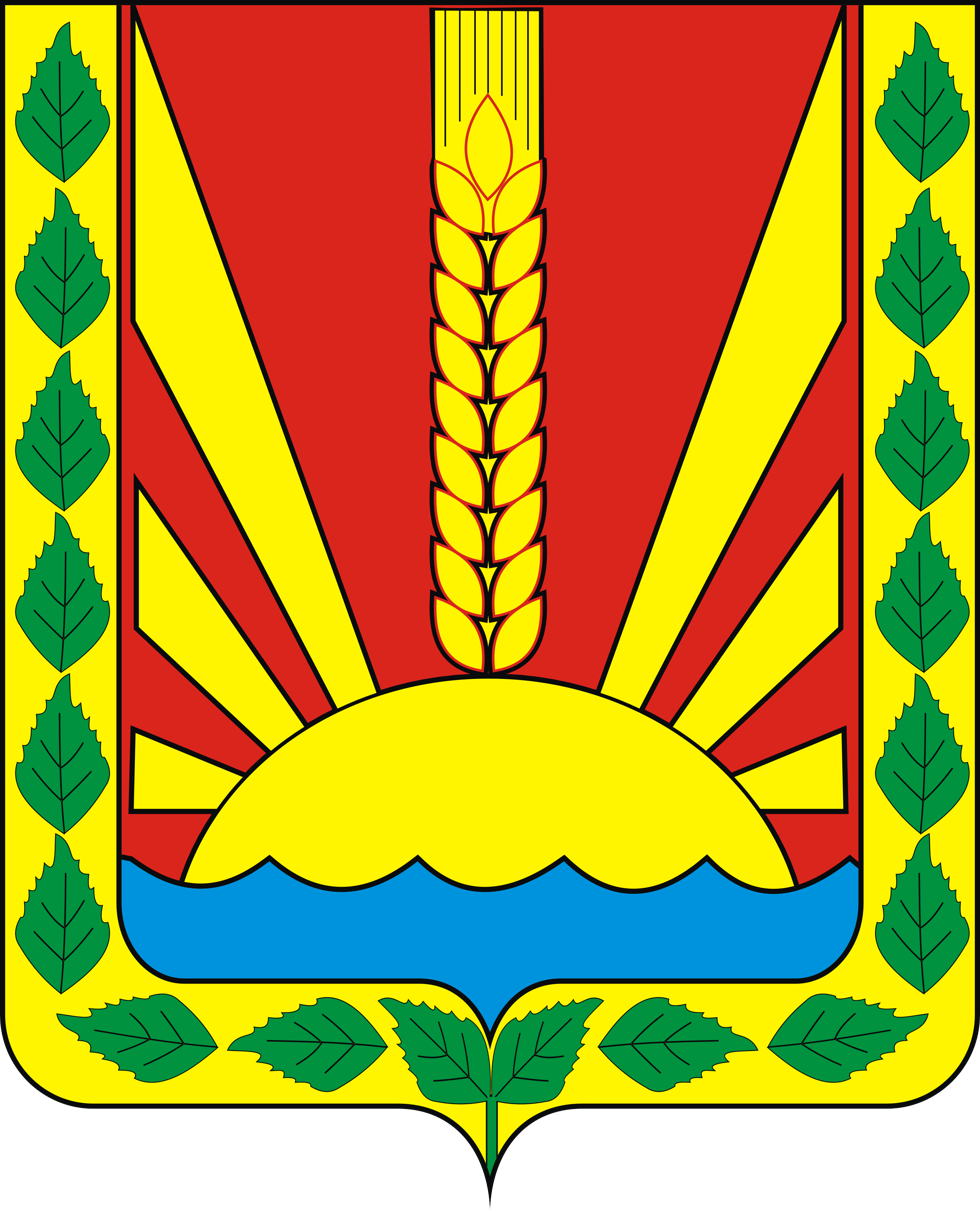
Shentalinsky District

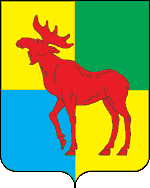
Shigonsky District

== Saratov Oblast ==
Saratov

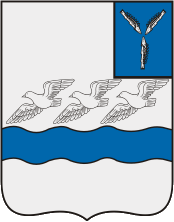
Atkarsk

Balakovo

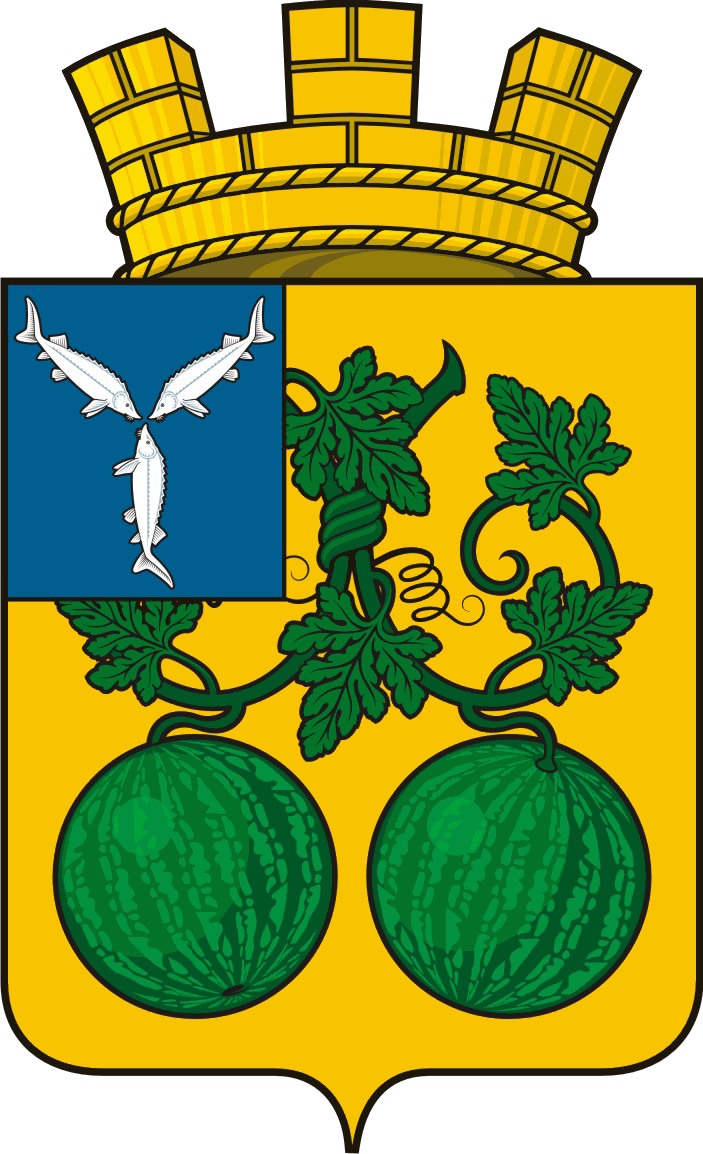
Balashov

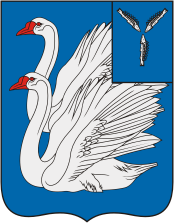
Kalininsk

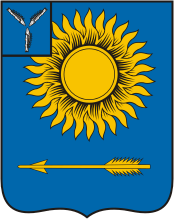
Svetly

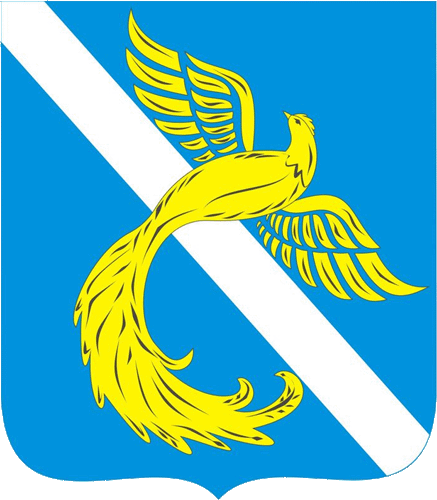
Tatishchevo

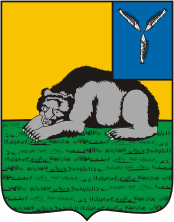
Volsk

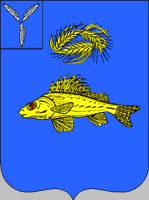
Yershov

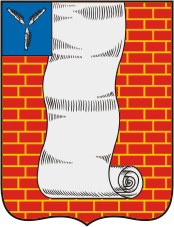
Krasnoarmeysk

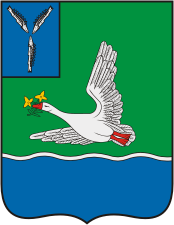
Marks

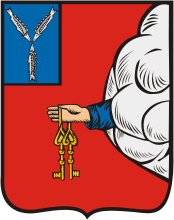
Petrovsk

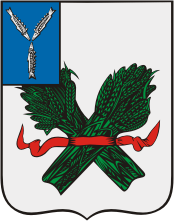
Pugachyov

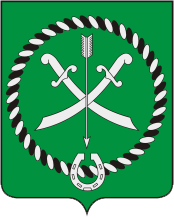
Rtishchevo

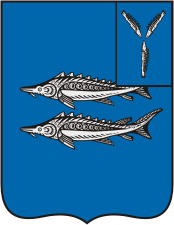
Khvalynsk

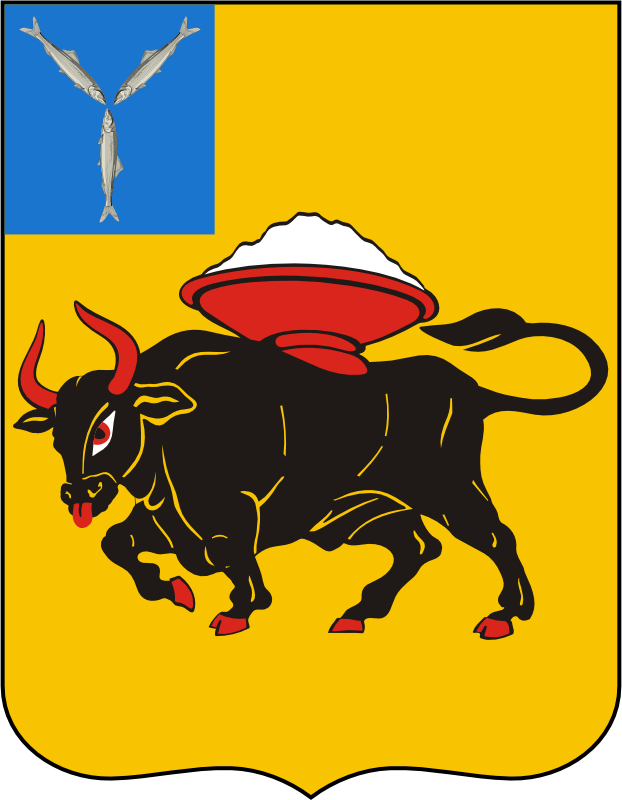
Engels

Shikhany

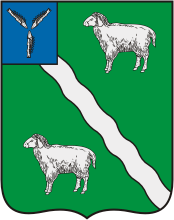
Alexandrovo-Gaysky District

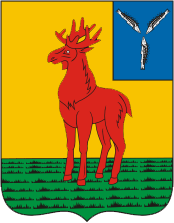
Arkadaksky District

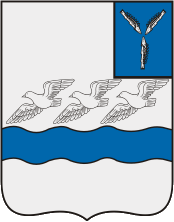
Atkarsky District

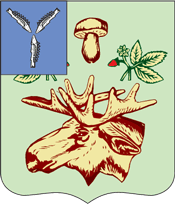
Bazarno-Karabulaksky District

Balakovsky District

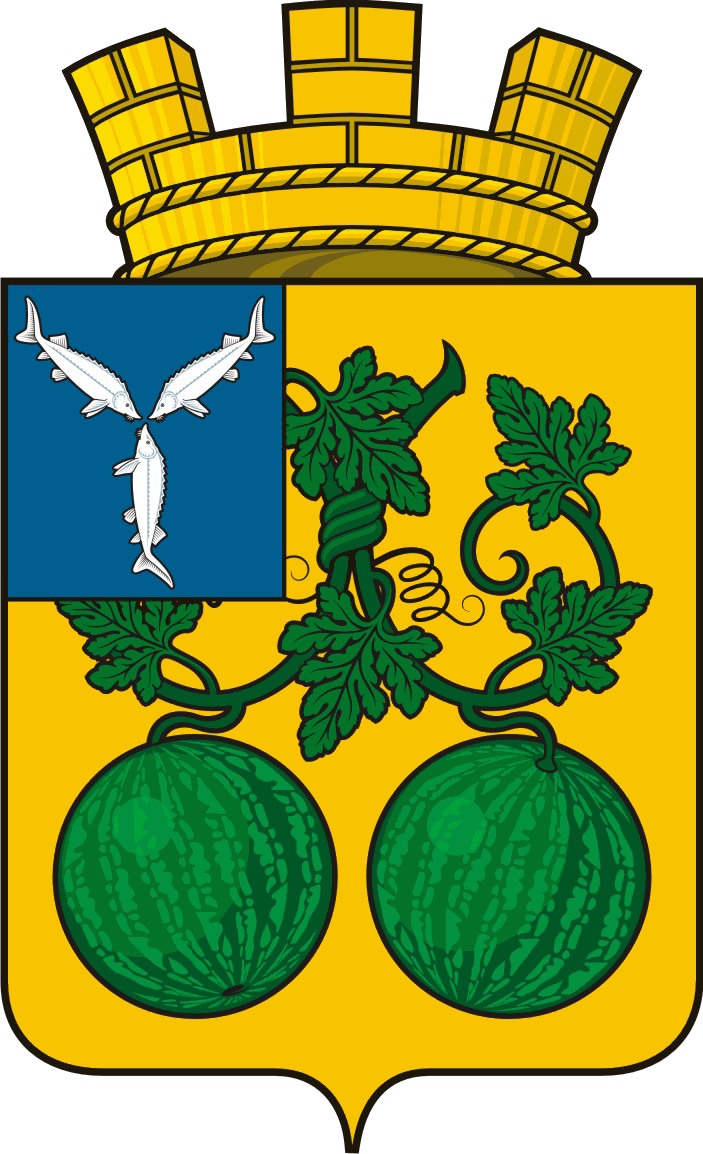
Balashovsky District

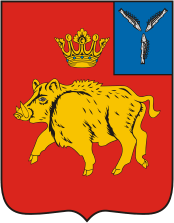
Baltaysky District

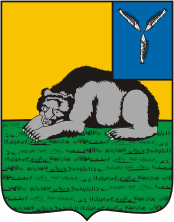
Volsky District

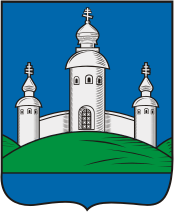
Voskresensky District

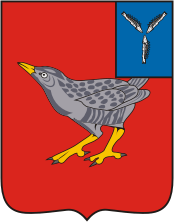
Dergachyovsky District

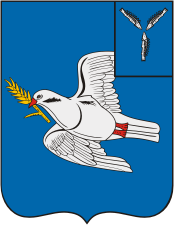
Dukhovnitsky District

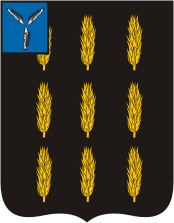
Yekaterinovsky District

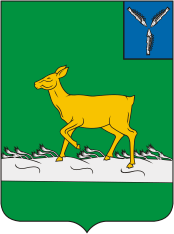
Ivanteyevsky District

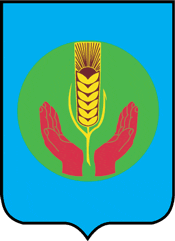
Kalininsky District

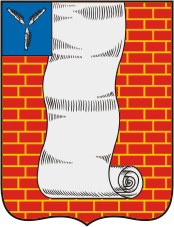
Krasnoarmeysky District

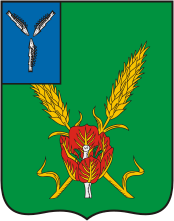
Krasnokutsky District

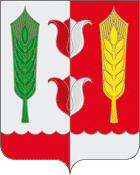
Krasnopartizansky District

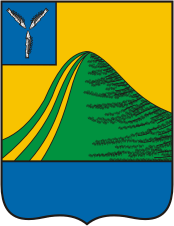
Lysogorsky District

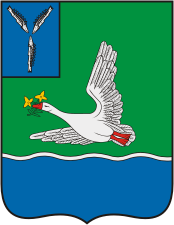
Marksovsky District

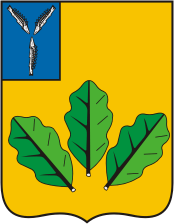
Novoburassky District

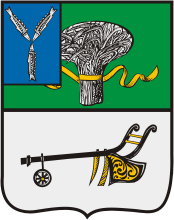
Novouzensky District

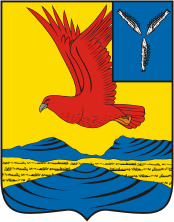
Ozinsky District

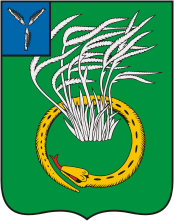
Perelyubsky District

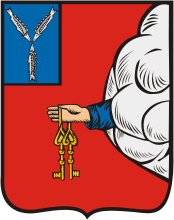
Petrovsky District

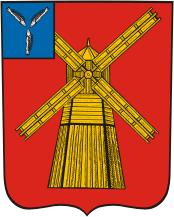
Pitersky District

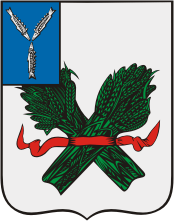
Pugachyovsky District

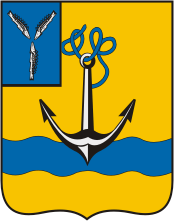
Rovensky District

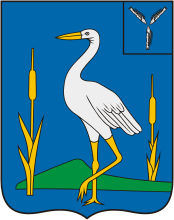
Romanovsky District

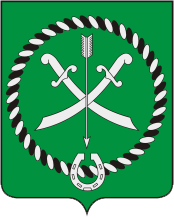
Rtishchevsky District

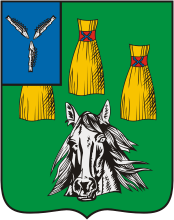
Samoylovsky District

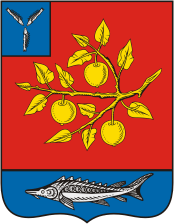
Saratovsky District

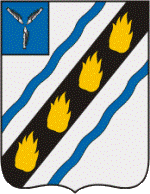
Sovetsky District

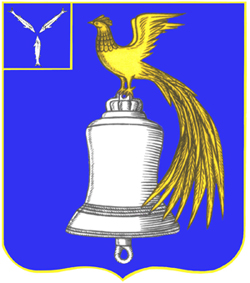
Tatishchevsky District

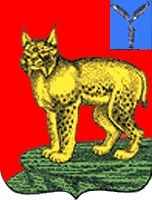
Turkovsky District

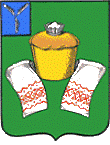
Fyodorovsky District

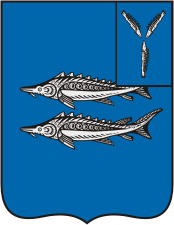
Khvalynsky District

== Smolensk Oblast ==
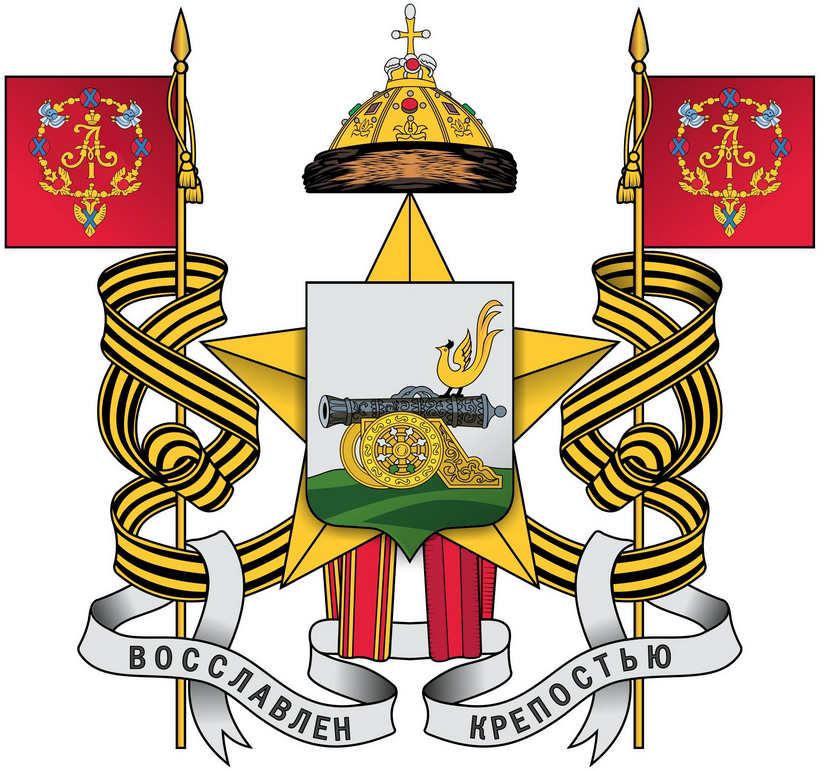
Coat of arms of Smolensk

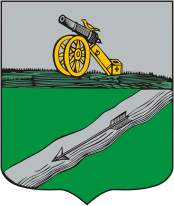
Demidov

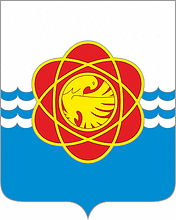
Desnogorsk

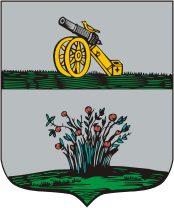
Dukhovshchina

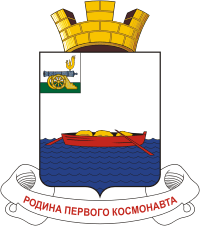
Gagarin

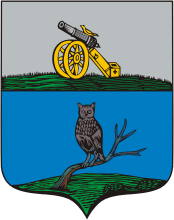
Sychyovka

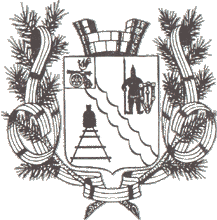
Ugra

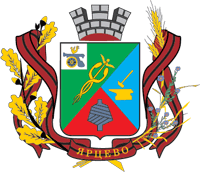
Yartsevo

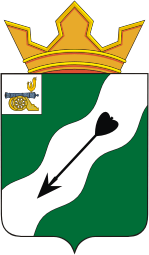
Demidovsky District

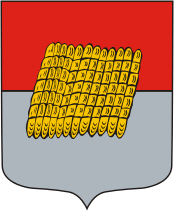
Dorogobuzhsky District

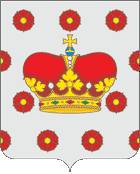
Dukhovshchinsky District

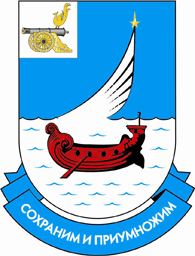
Gagarinsky District

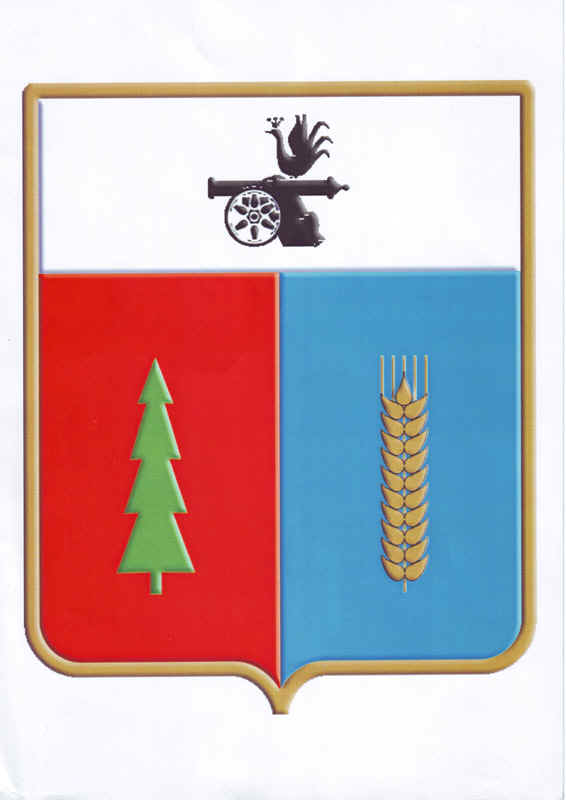
Glinkovsky District

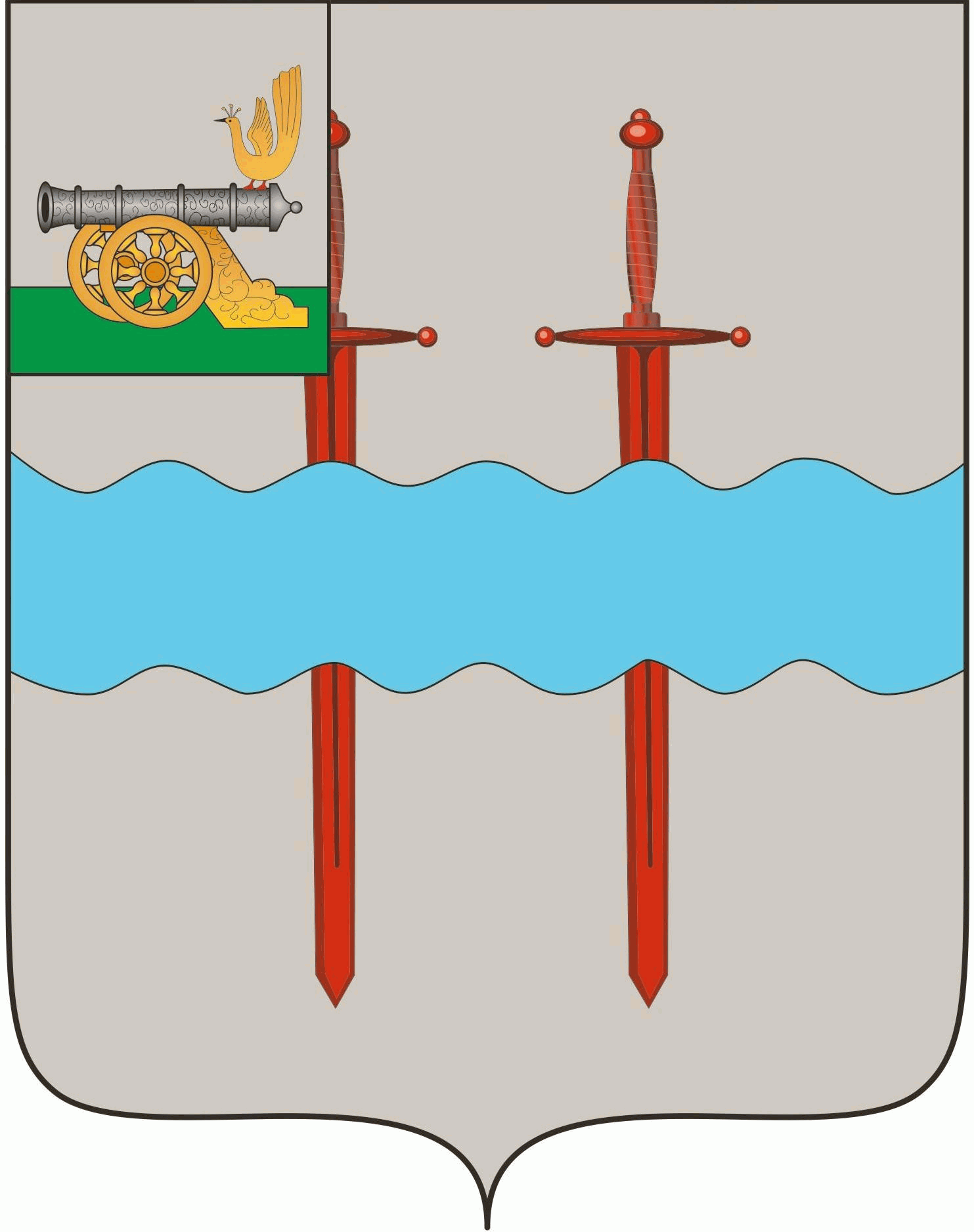
Kardymovsky District

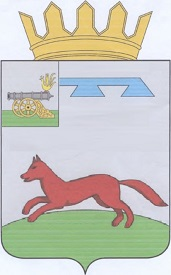
Khislavichsky District

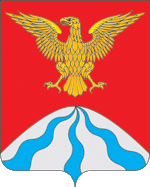
Kholm-Zhirkovsky District

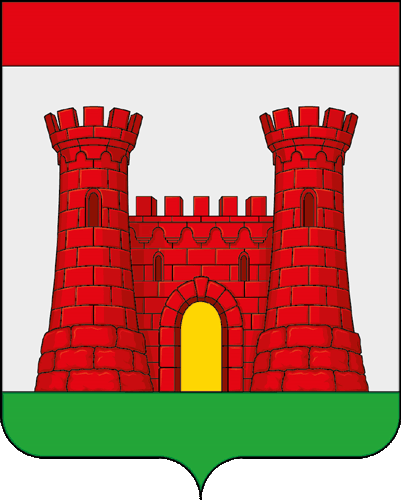
Krasninsky District

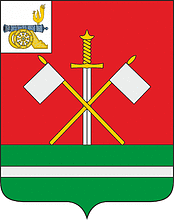
Monastyrshchinsky District

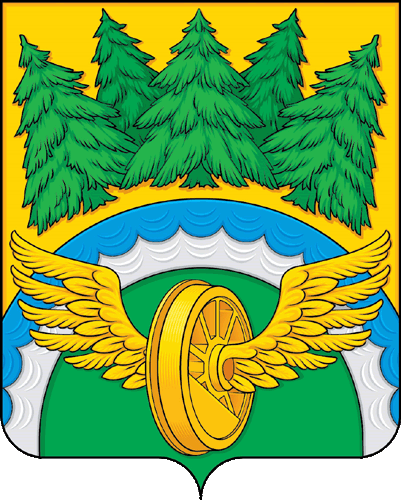
Novoduginsky District

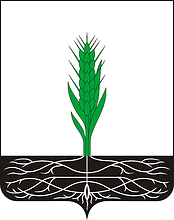
Pochinkovsky District

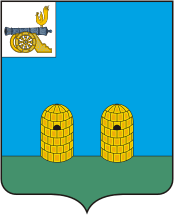
Roslavlsky District

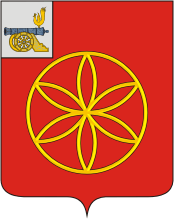
Rudnyansky District

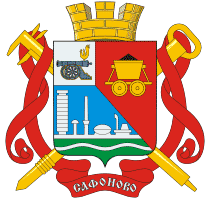
Safonovsky District

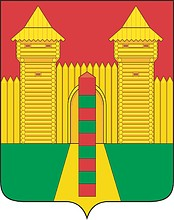
Shumyachsky District

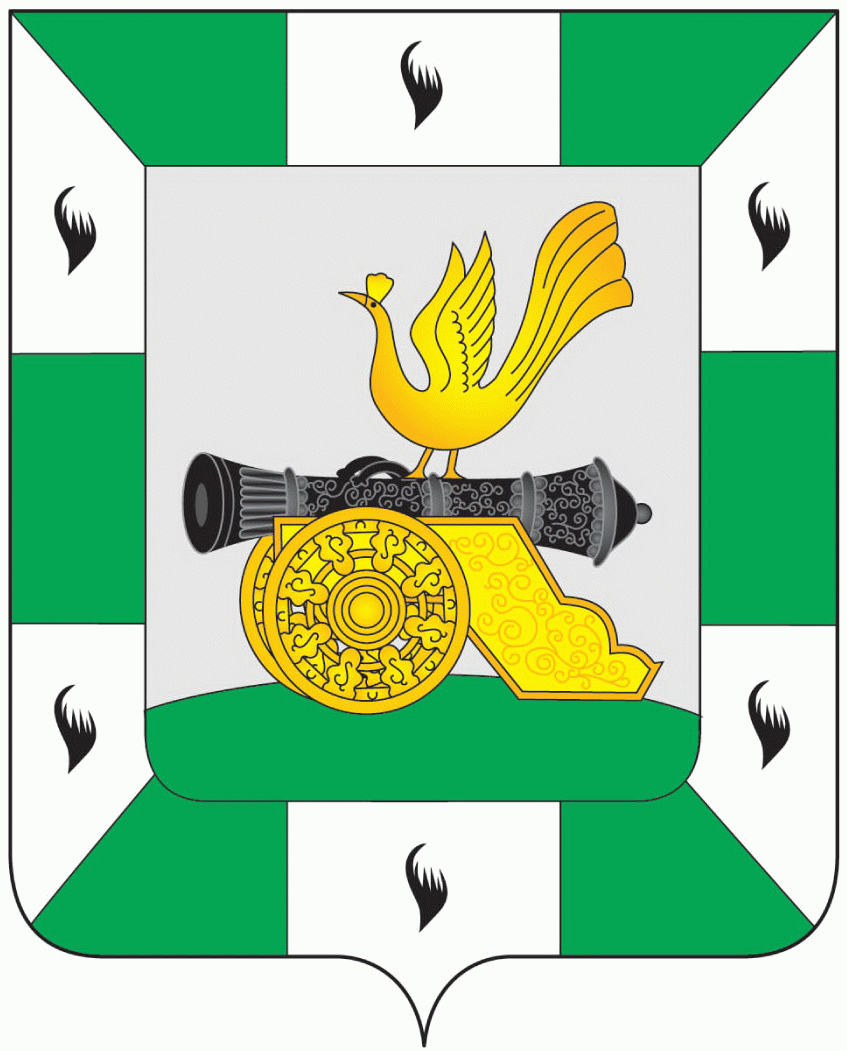
Smolensky District

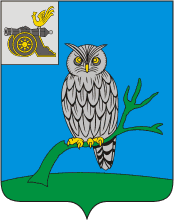
Sychyovsky District

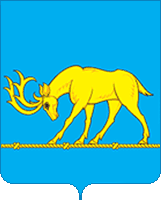
Tyomkinsky District

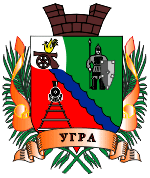
Ugransky District

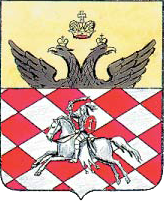
Velizhsky District

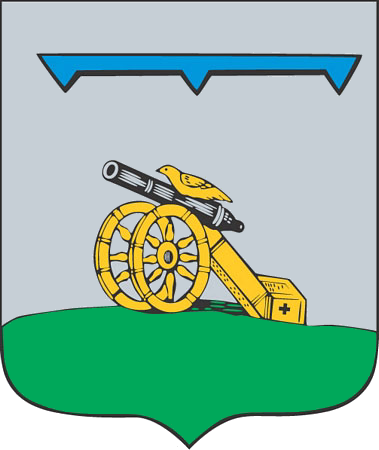
Vyazemsky District

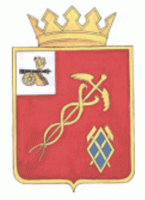
Yartsevsky District

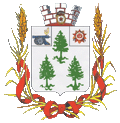
Yelninsky District

== Sverdlovsk Oblast ==
Yekaterinburg

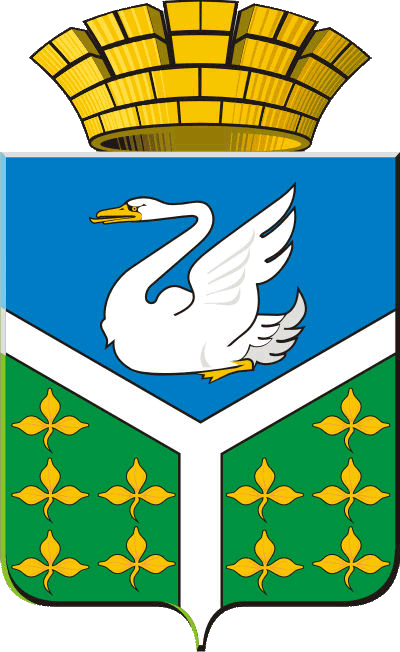
Achit

Alapayevsk

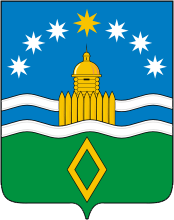
Aramil

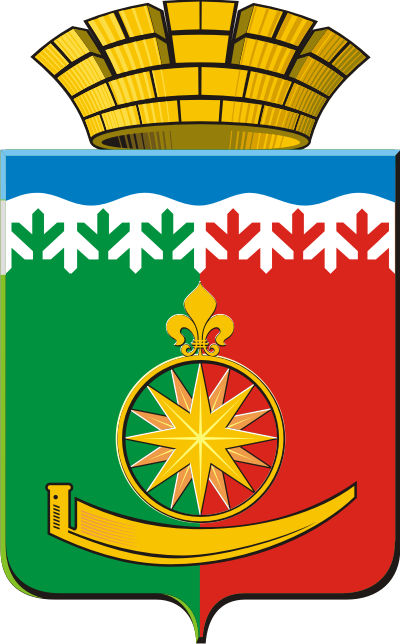
Arti

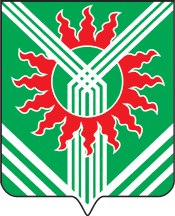
Asbest

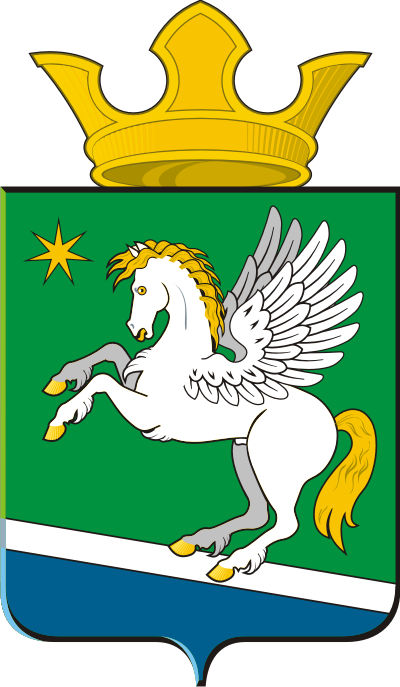
Atig

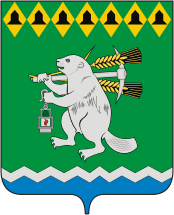
Artyomovsky

Beryozovsky

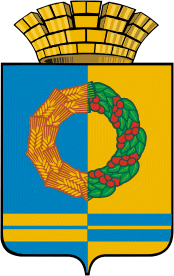
Beloyarsky

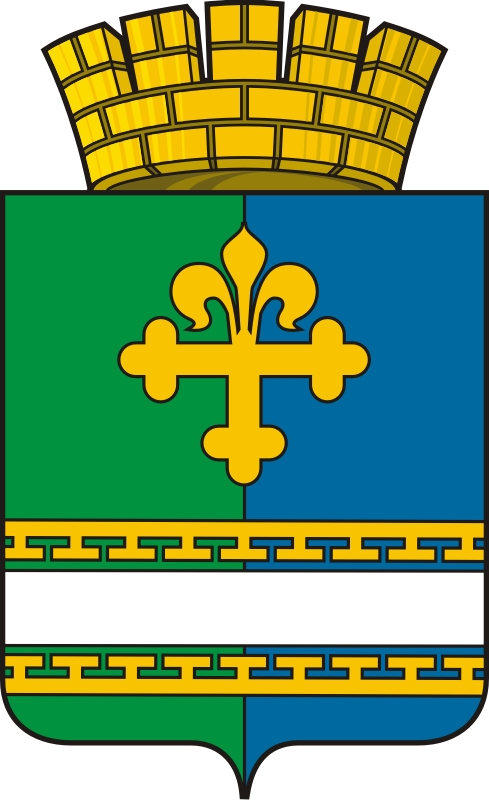
Bogdanovich

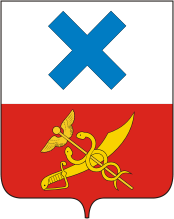
Irbit

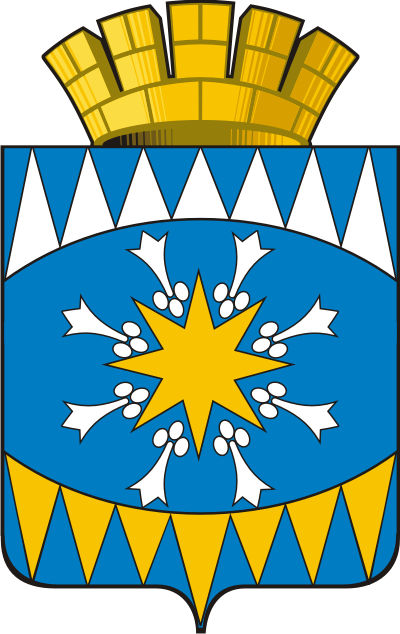
Ivdel

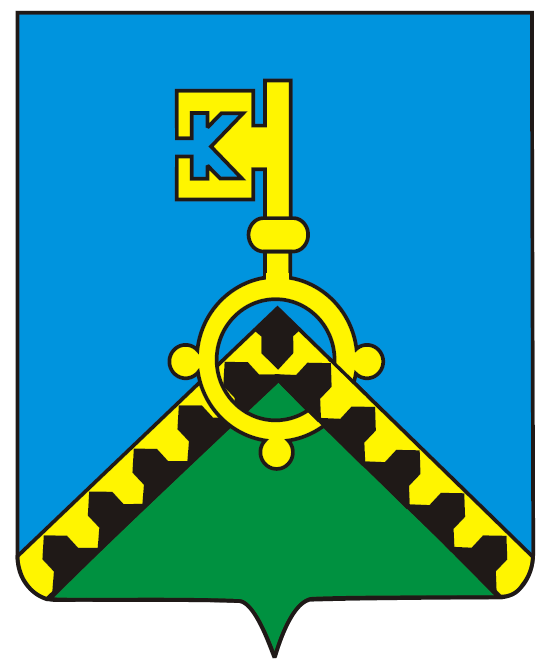
Kachkanar

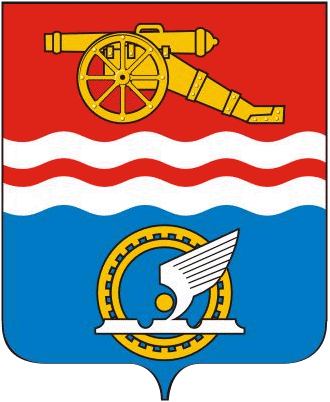
Kamensk-Uralsky

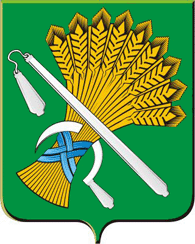
Kamyshlov

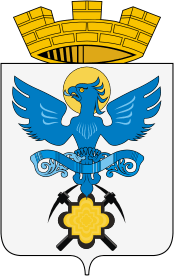
Karpinsk

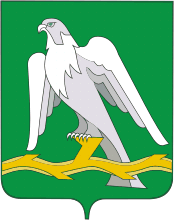
Krasnoufimsk

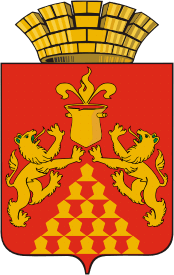
Krasnouralsk

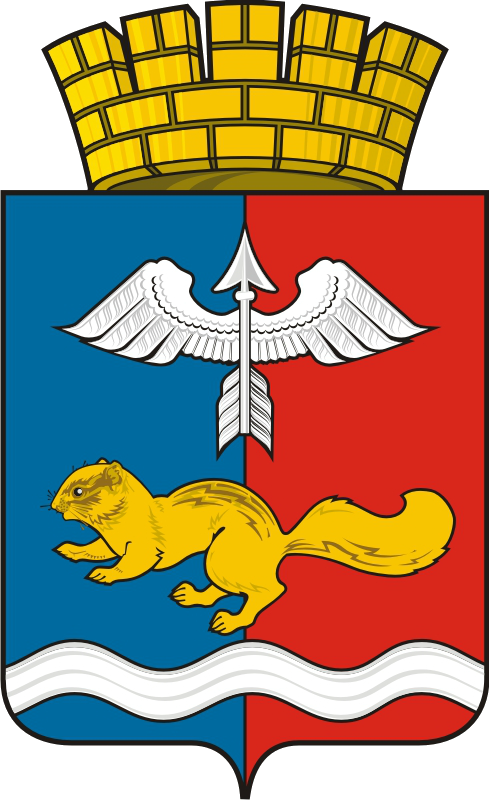
Krasnoturyinsk

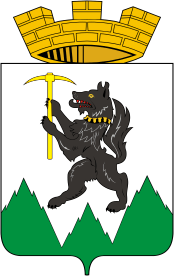
Kirovgrad

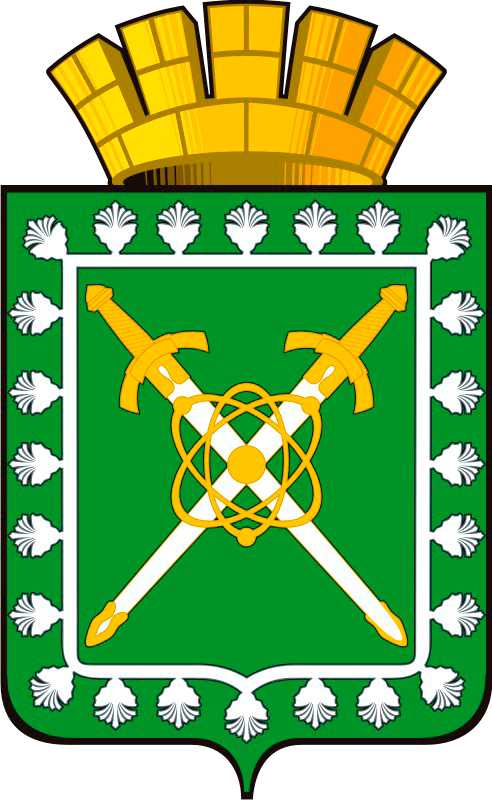
Lesnoy

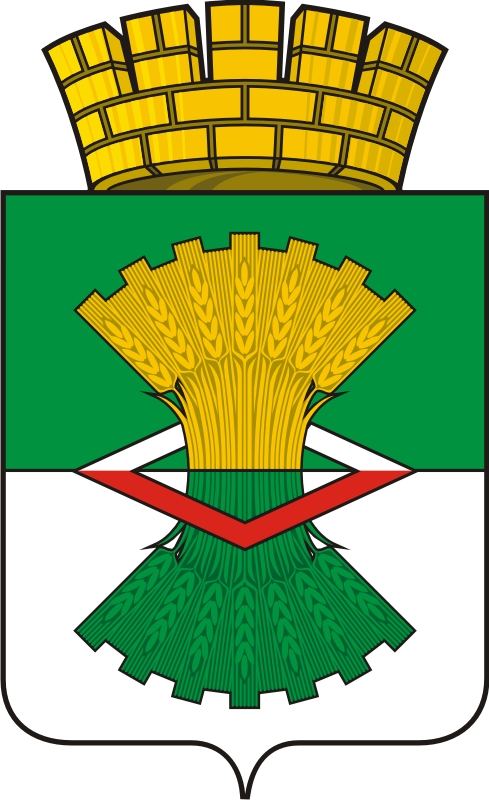
Makhnyovo

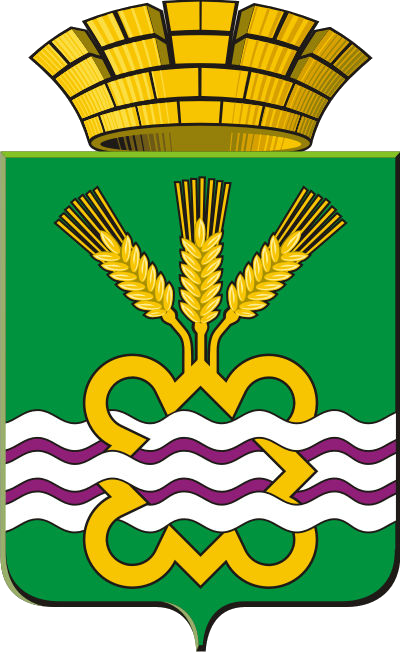
Martyush

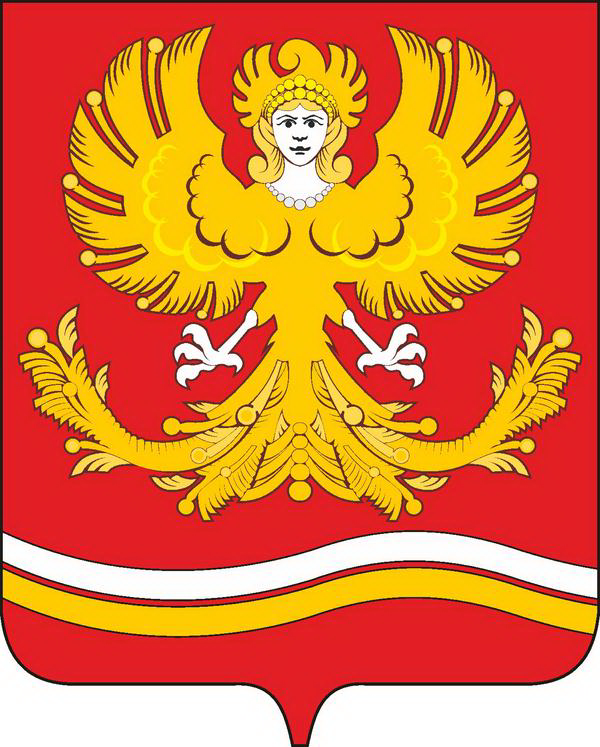
Mikhaylovsk

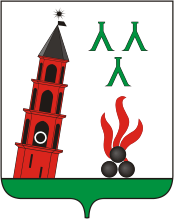
Nevyansk

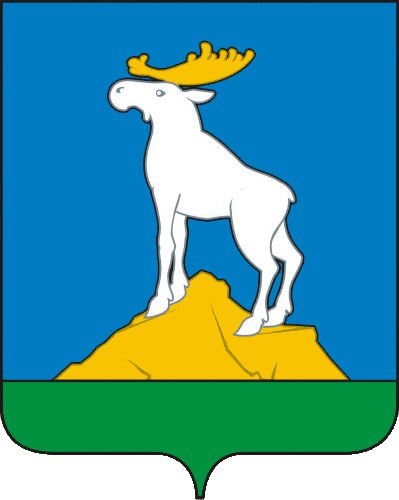
Nizhniye Sergi

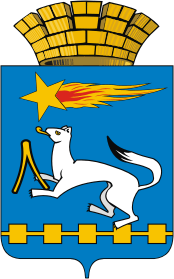
Nizhnyaya Salda

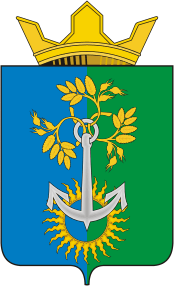
Nizhnyaya Tura

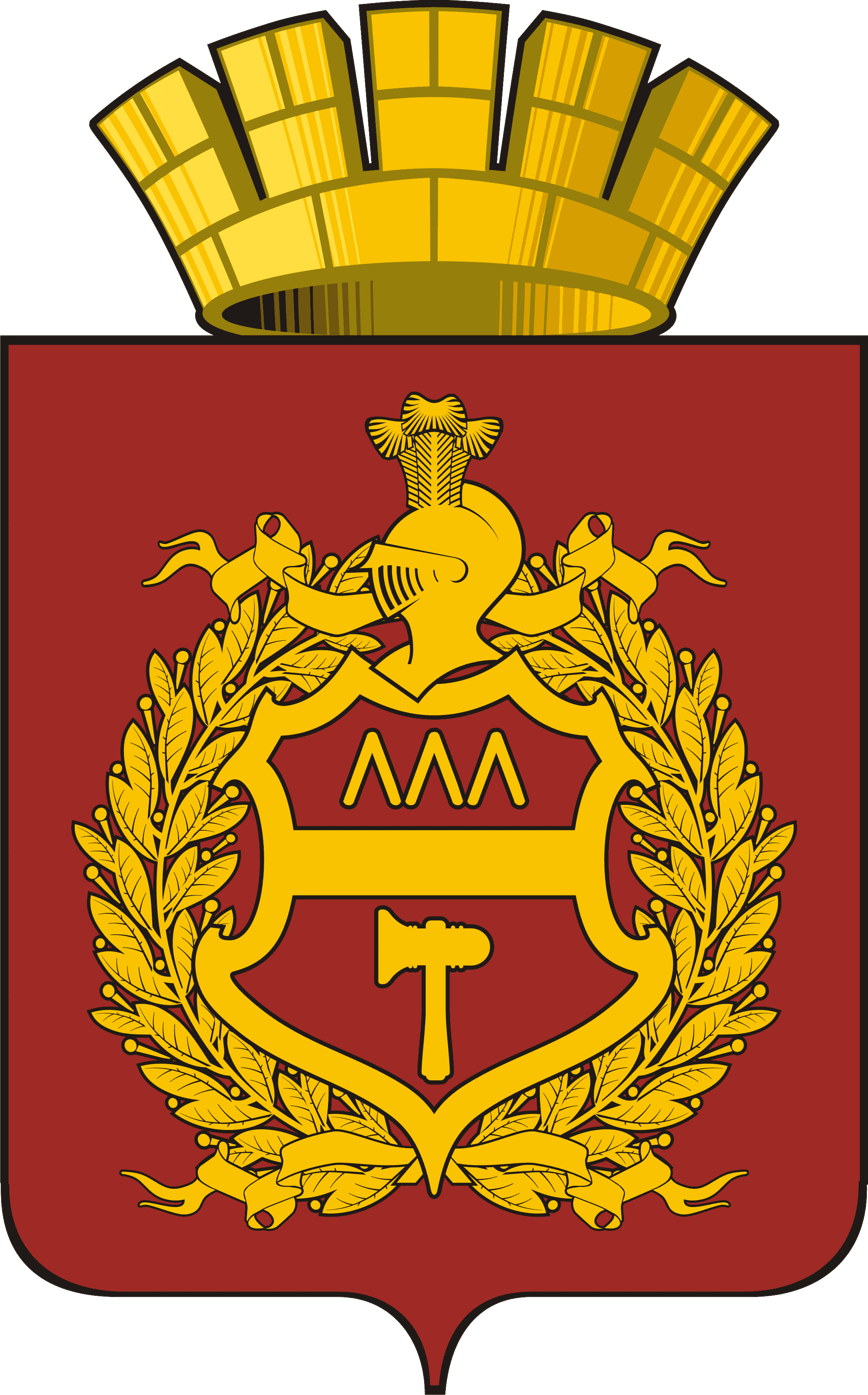
Nizhny Tagil

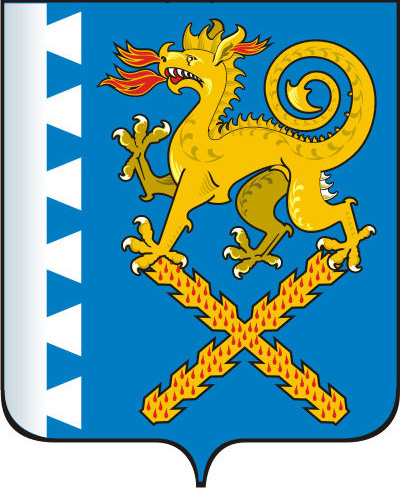
Novaya Lyalya

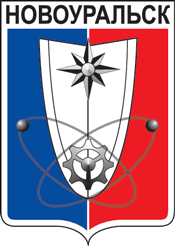
Novouralsk

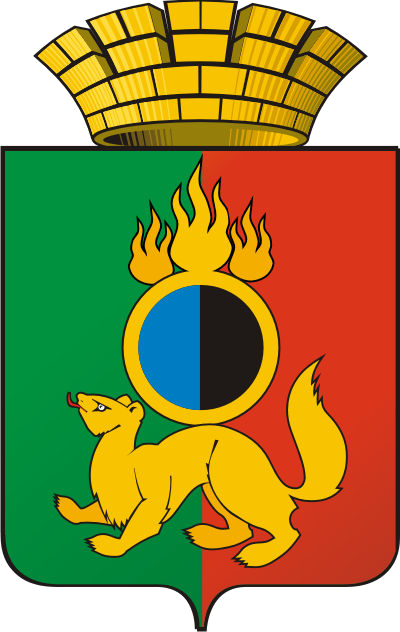
Pervouralsk

Polevskoy

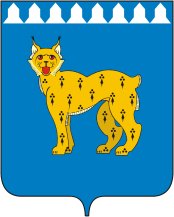
Rezh

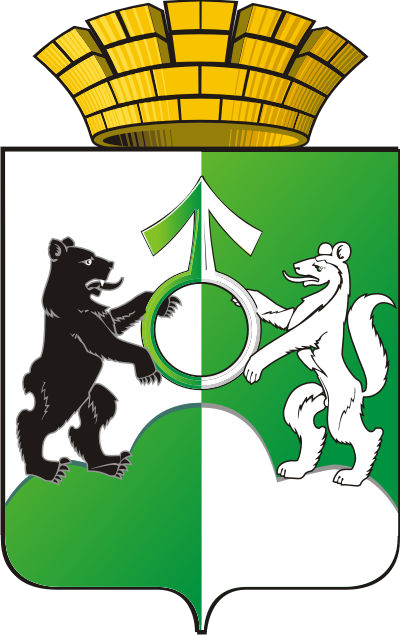
Revda

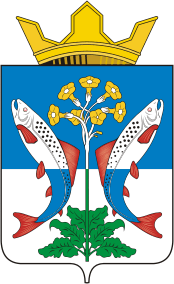
Shalya

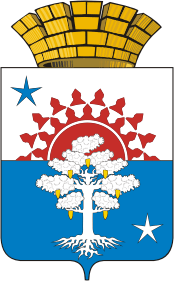
Serov

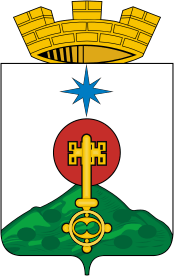
Severouralsk

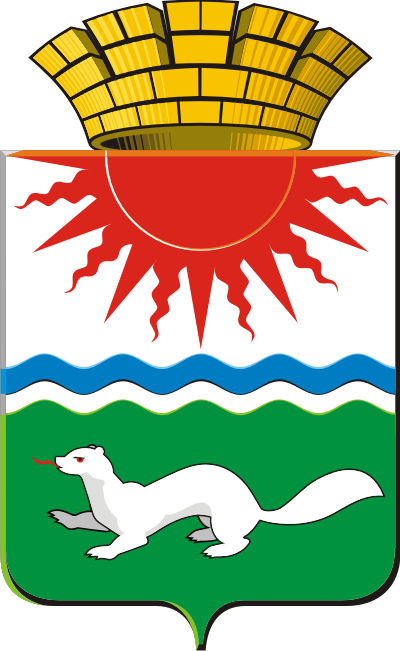
Sosva

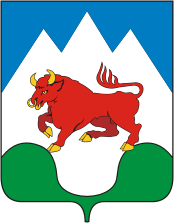
Sukhoy Log

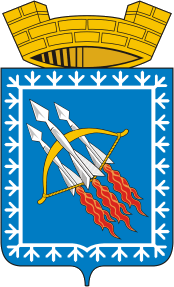
Svobodny

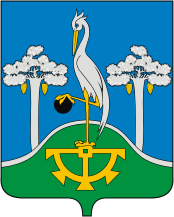
Sysert

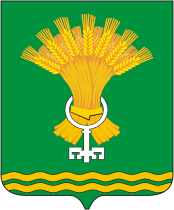
Talitsa

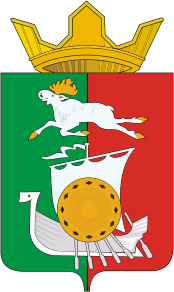
Tavda

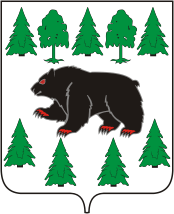
Turinsk

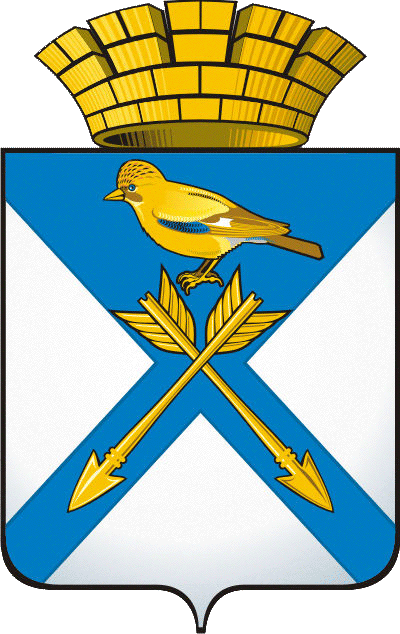
Tugulym

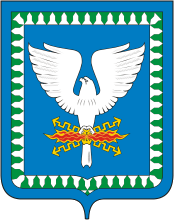
Uralsky

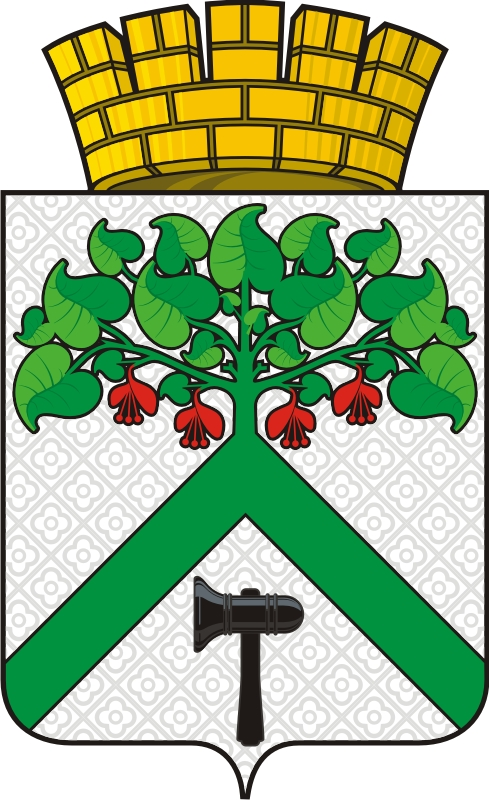
Verkhnyaya Salda

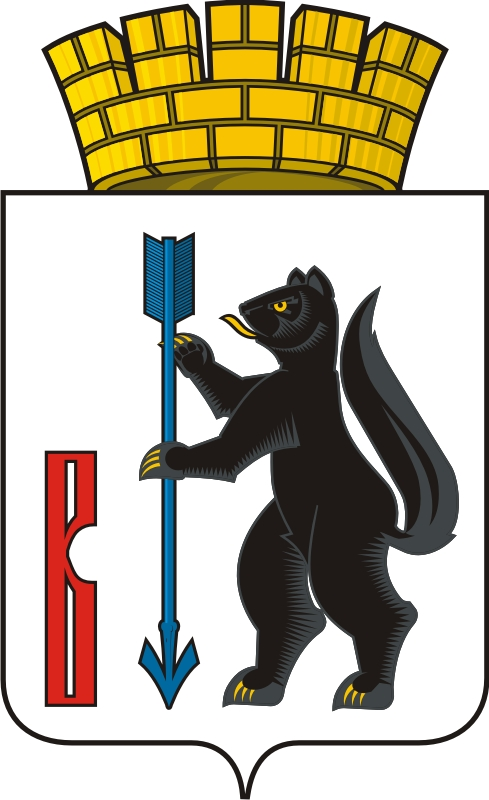
Verkhoturye

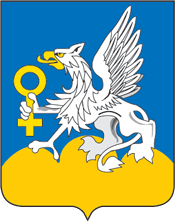
Verkhnyaya Pyshma

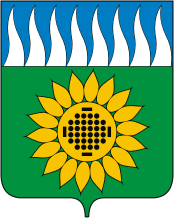
Zarechny

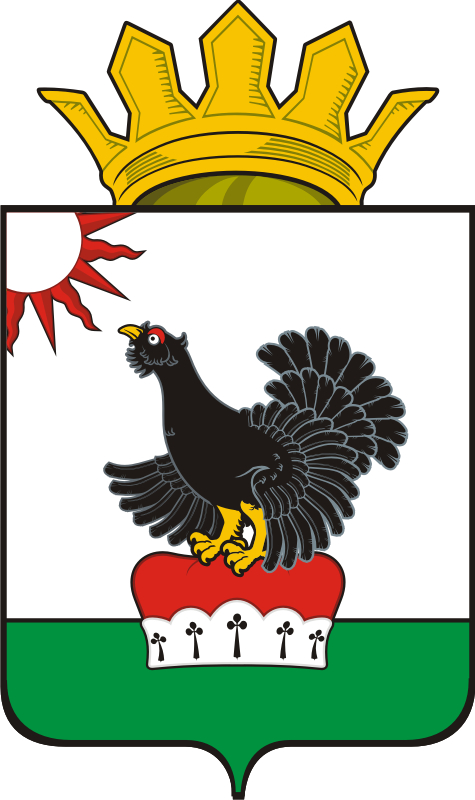
Taborinsky District

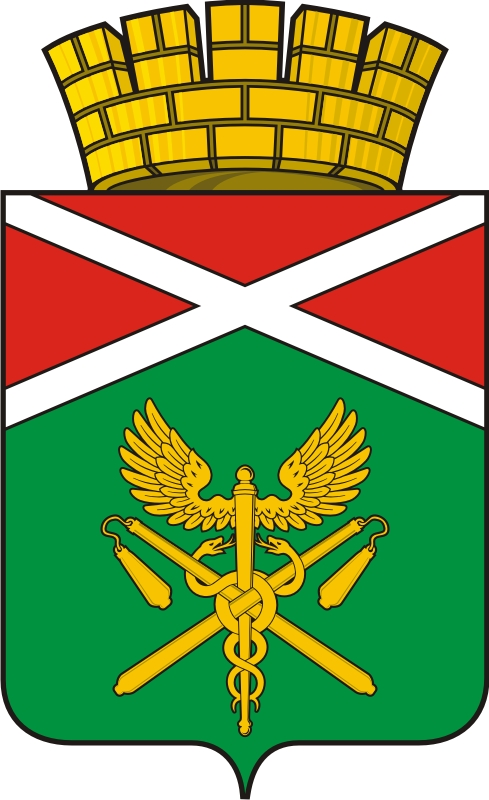
Irbitsky District

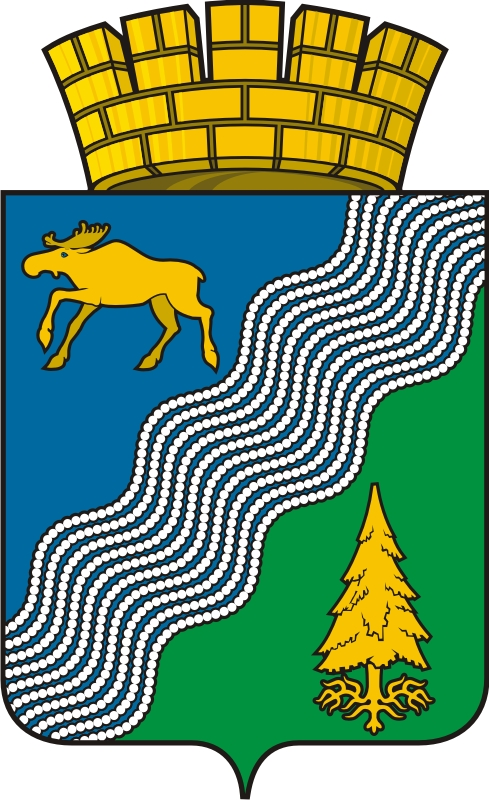
Bisert

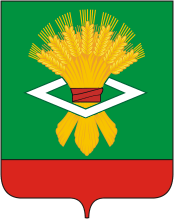
Alapayevsky District

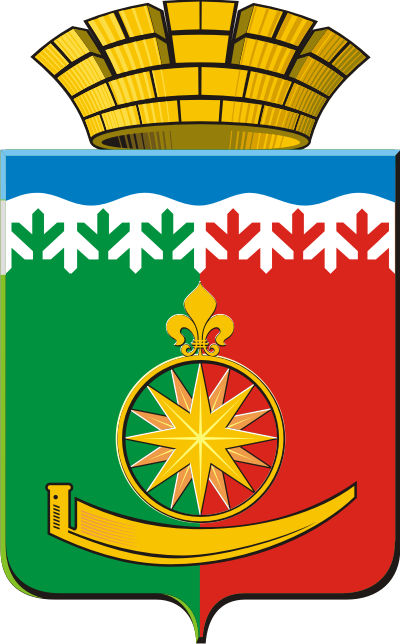
Artinsky District

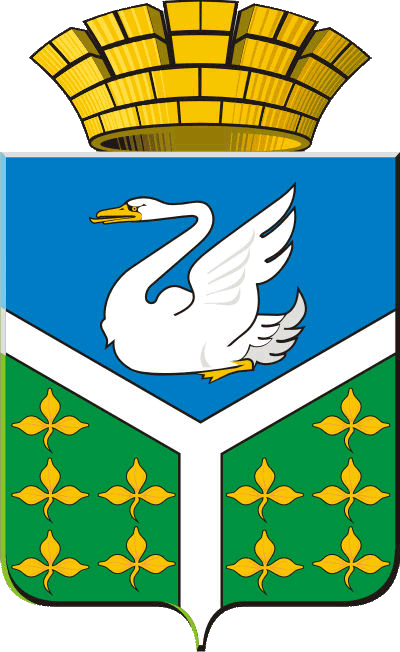
Achitsky District

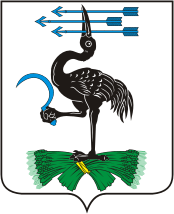
Baykalovsky District

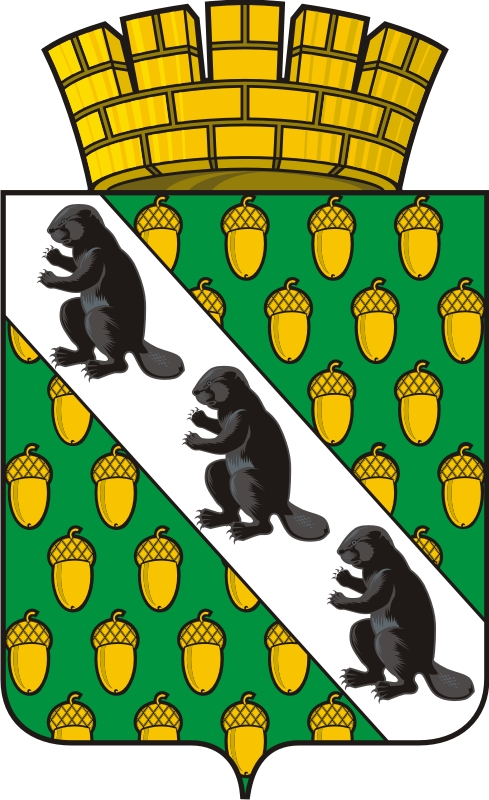
Verkhneye Dubrovo

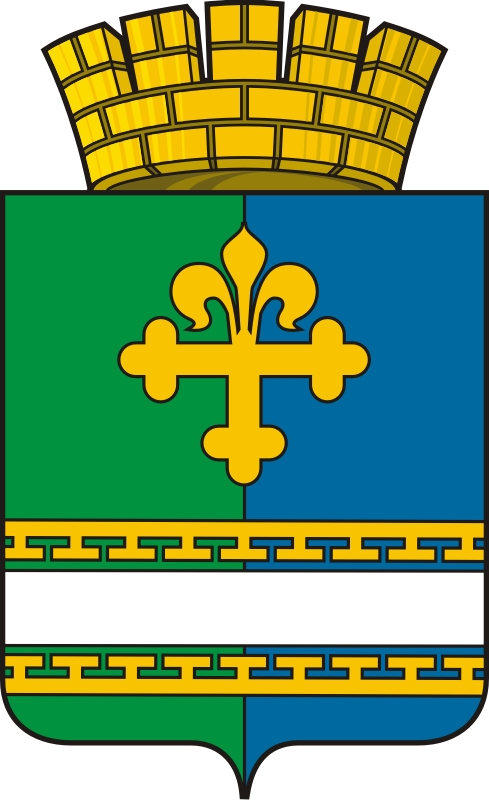
Bogdanovichsky District

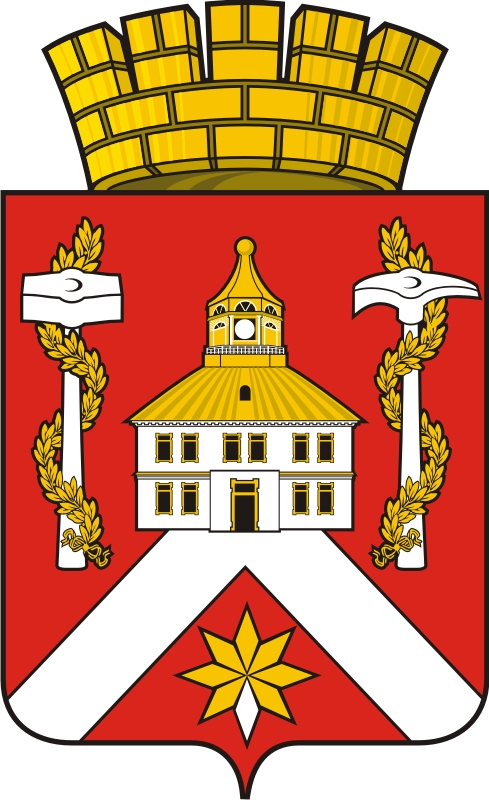
Verkh-Neyvinsky

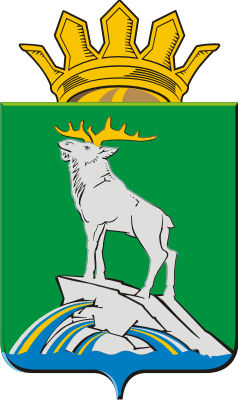
Nizhneserginsky District

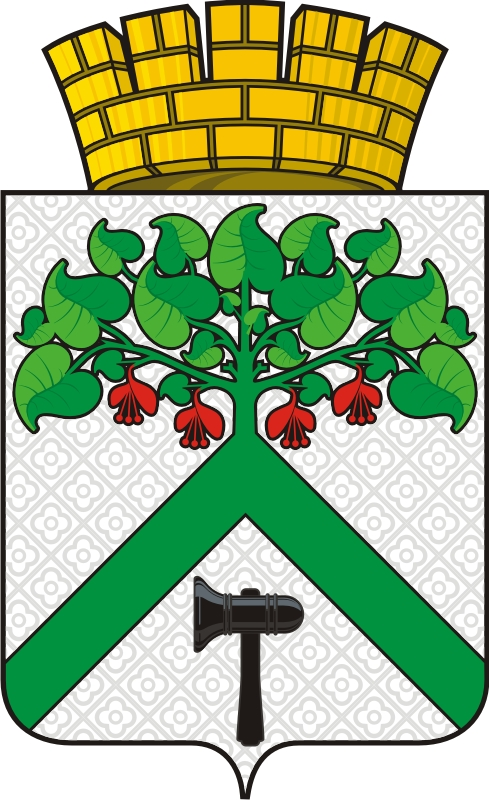
Verkhnesaldinsky District

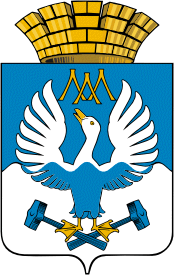
Staroutkinsk

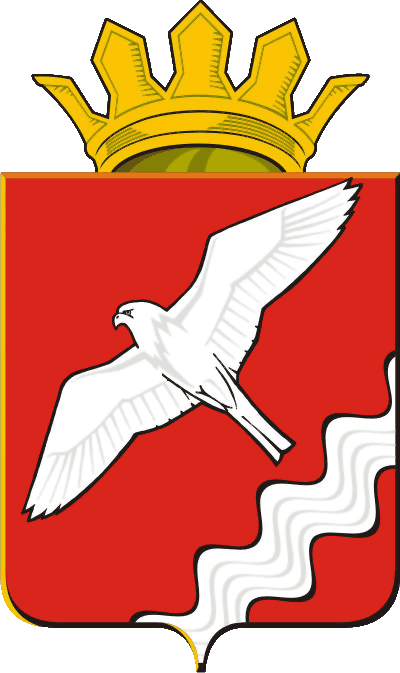
Krasnoufimsky District

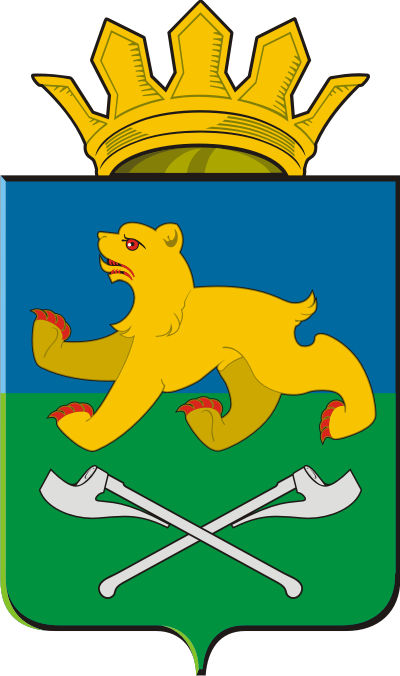
Slobodo-Turinsky District

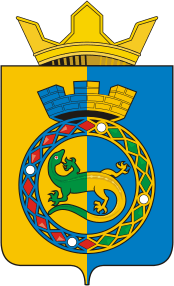
Prigorodny District

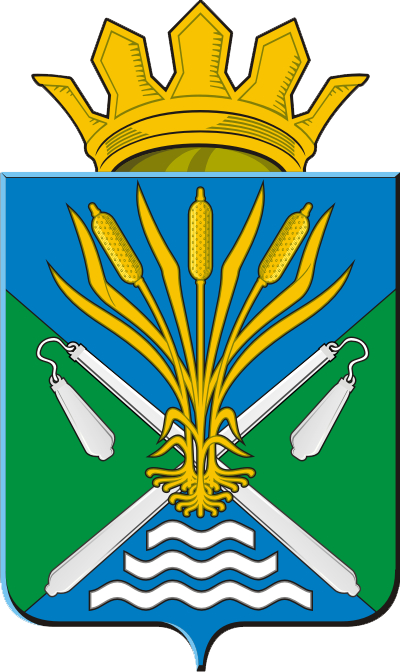
Kamyshlovsky District

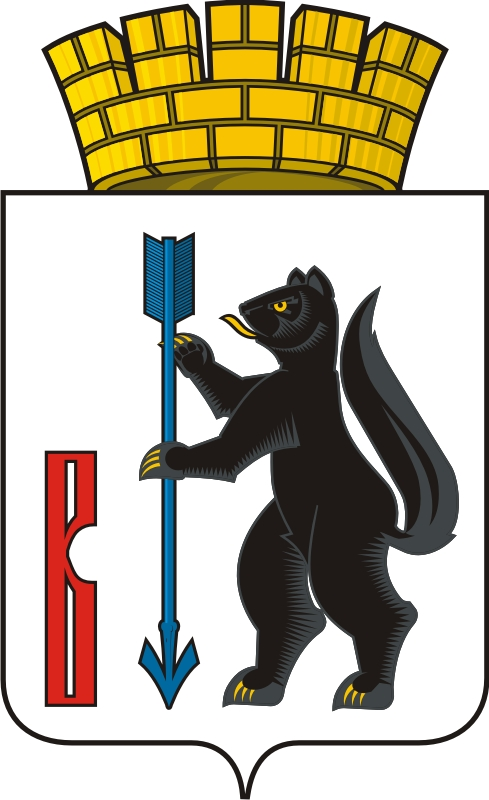
Verkhotursky District

== Tambov Oblast ==
Tambov

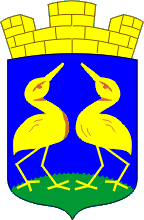
Kirsanov

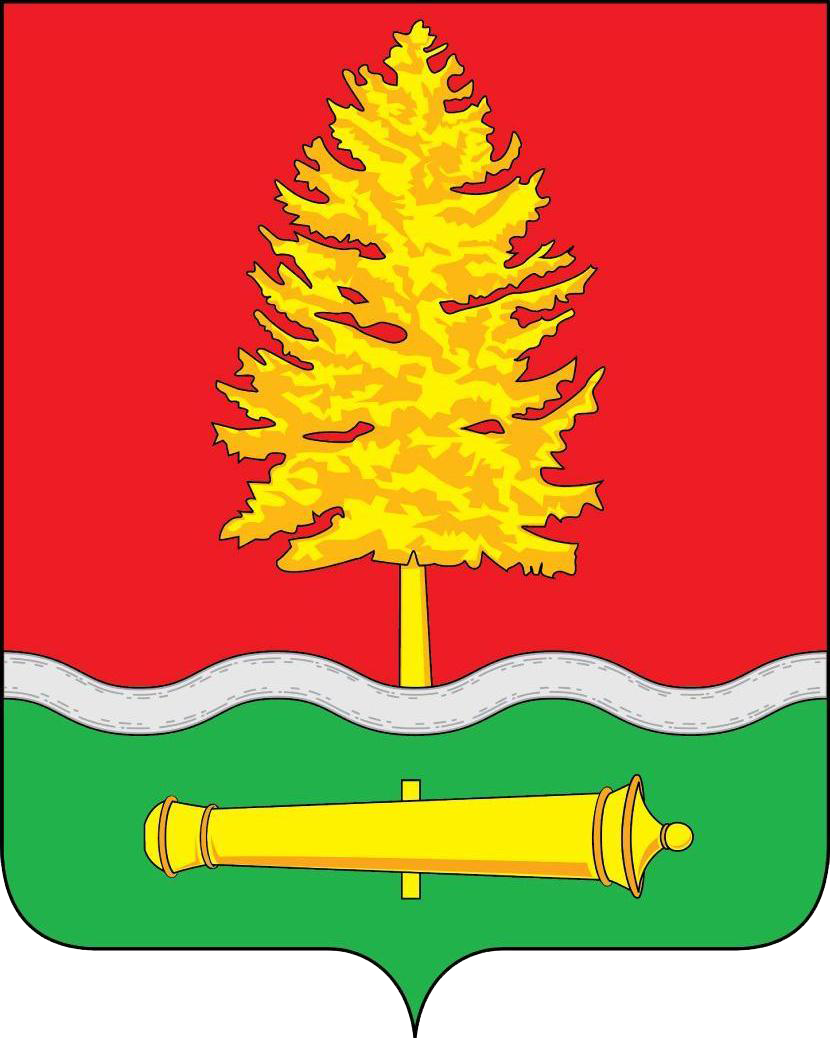
Kotovsk

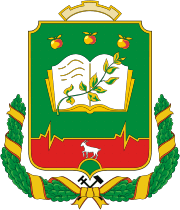
Michurinsk

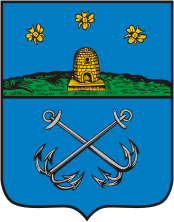
Morshansk

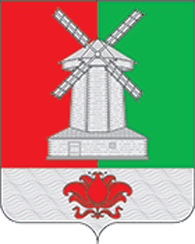
Muchkapsky

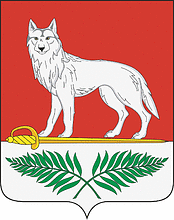
Novaya Lyada

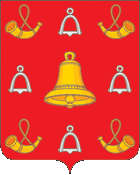
Pervomaysky

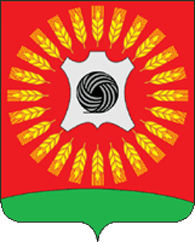
Rasskazovo

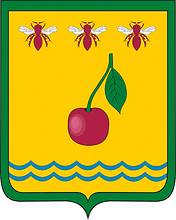
Uvarovo

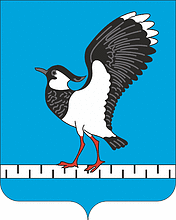
Zherdevka

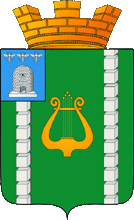
Znamenka

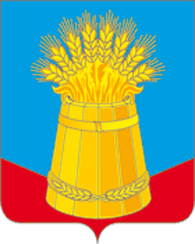
Bondarsky District

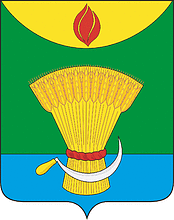
Gavrilovsky District

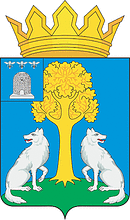
Inzhavinsky District

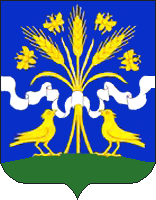
Kirsanovsky District

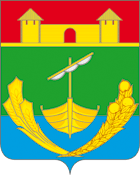
Michurinsky District

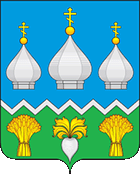
Mordovsky District

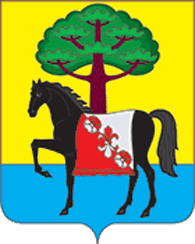
Morshansky District

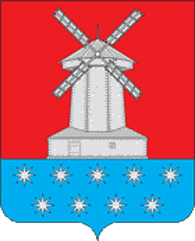
Muchkapsky District

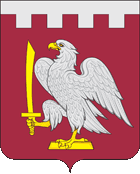
Nikiforovsky District

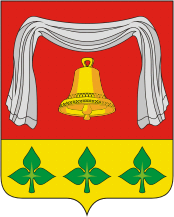
Pervomaysky District

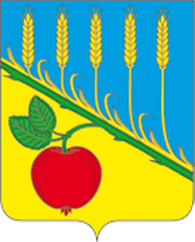
Petrovsky District

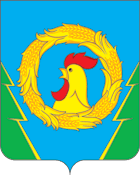
Rasskazovsky District

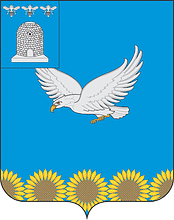
Rzhaksinsky District

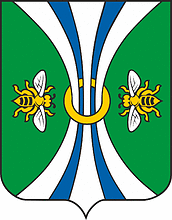
Sampursky District

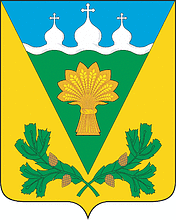
Sosnovsky District

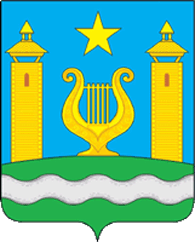
Staroyuryevsky District

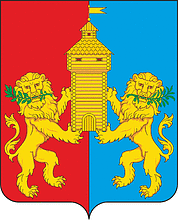
Tambovsky District

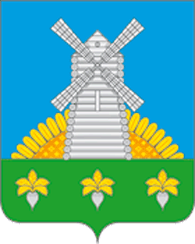
Tokaryovsky District

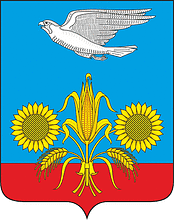
Umyotsky District

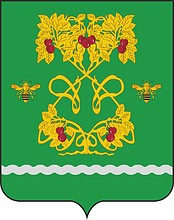
Uvarovsky District

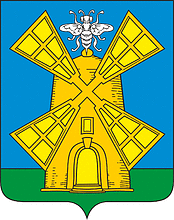
Zherdevsky District

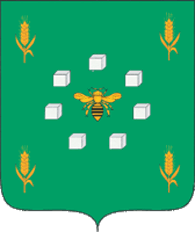
Znamensky District

== Tomsk Oblast ==
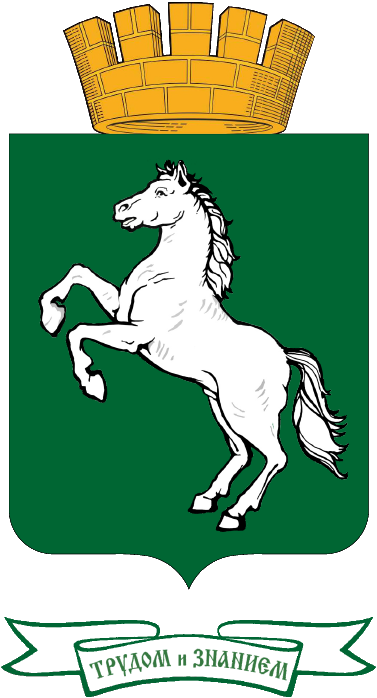
Tomsk

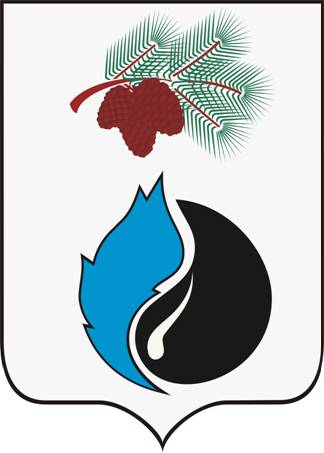
Kedrovy

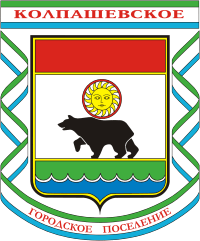
Kolpashevo

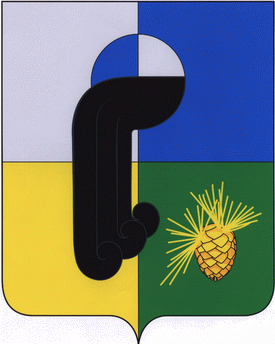
Strezhevoy

Seversk

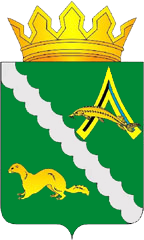
Alexandrovsky District

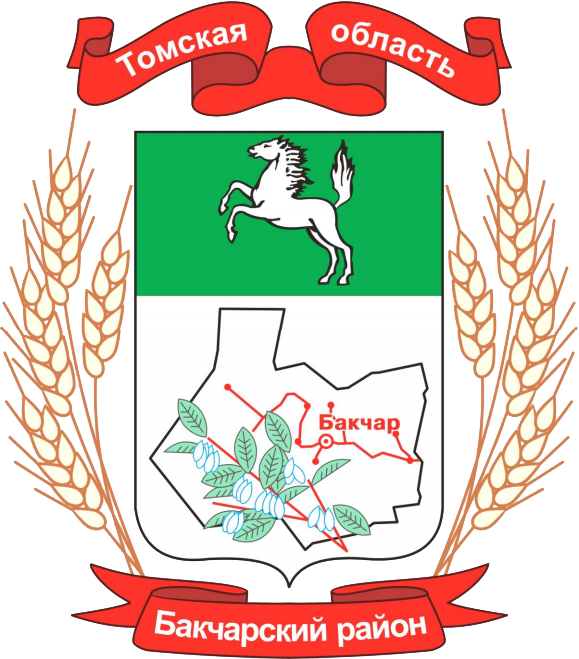
Bakcharsky District

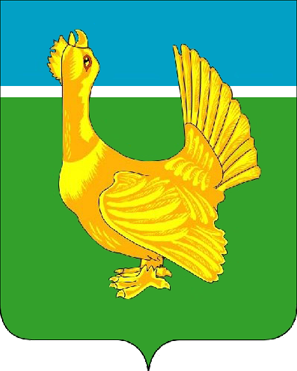
Verkhneketsky District

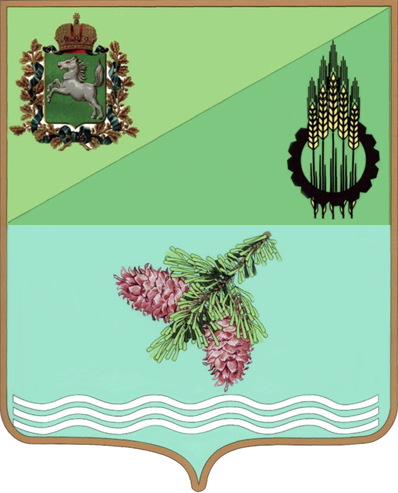
Zyryansky District

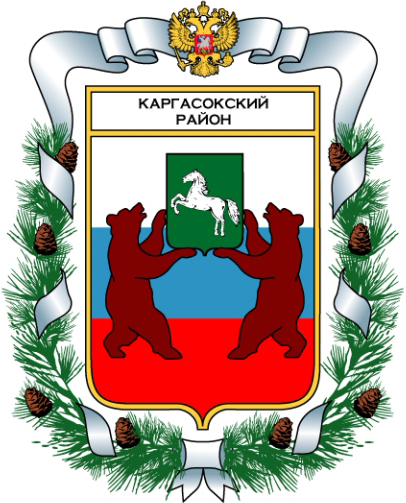
Kargasoksky District

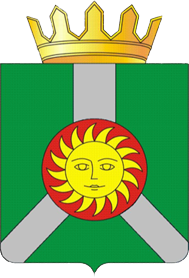
Kolpashevsky District

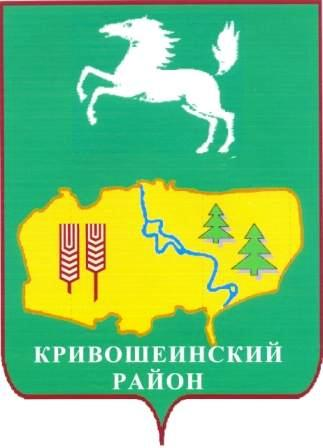
Krivosheinsky District

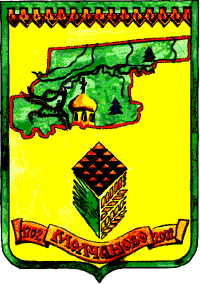
Molchanovsky District

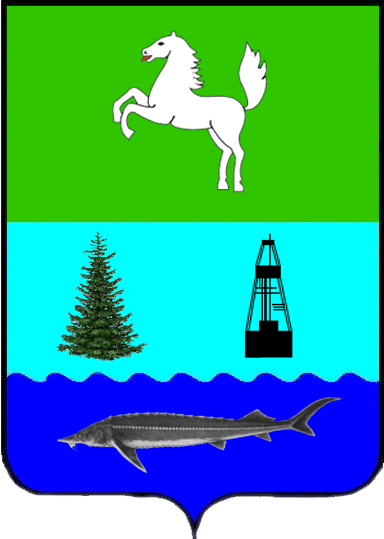
Parabelsky District

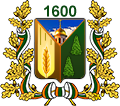
Pervomaysky District

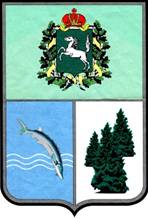
Teguldetsky District

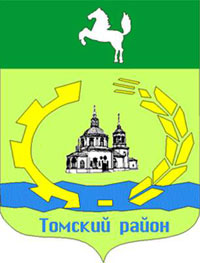
Tomsky District

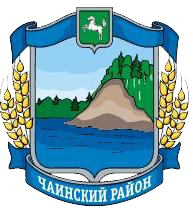
Chainsky District

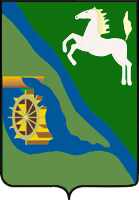
Shegarsky District

== Tver Oblast ==
Tver

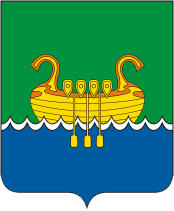
Andreapol

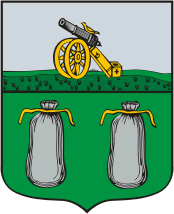
Bely

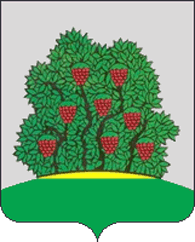
Bezhetsk

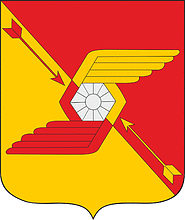
Bologoye

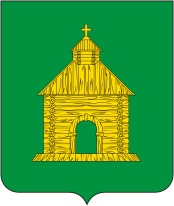
Kalyazin

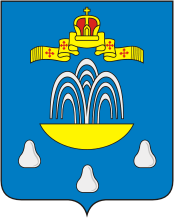
Kashin

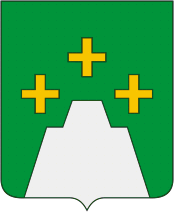
Kesova Gora

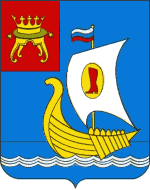
Kimry

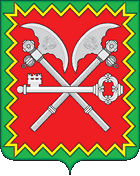
Kozlovo

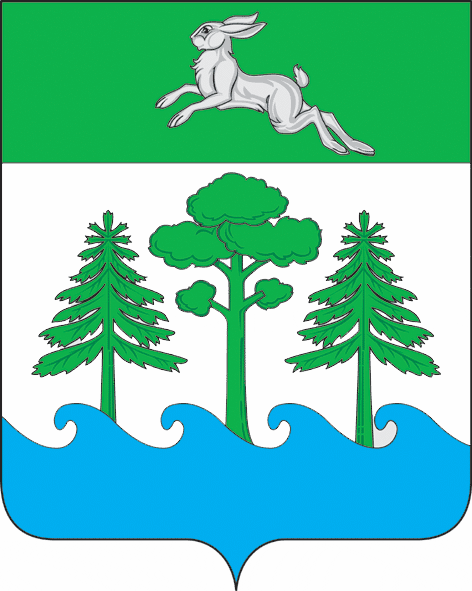
Konakovo

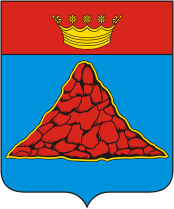
Krasny Kholm

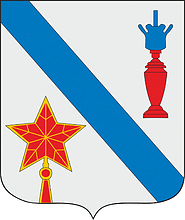
Krasnomaysky

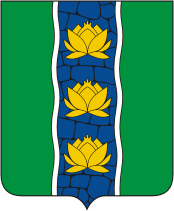
Kuvshinovo

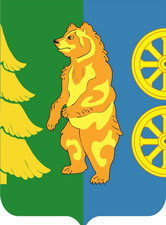
Kuzhenkino

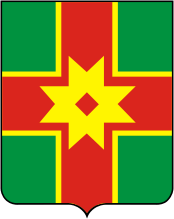
Likhoslavl

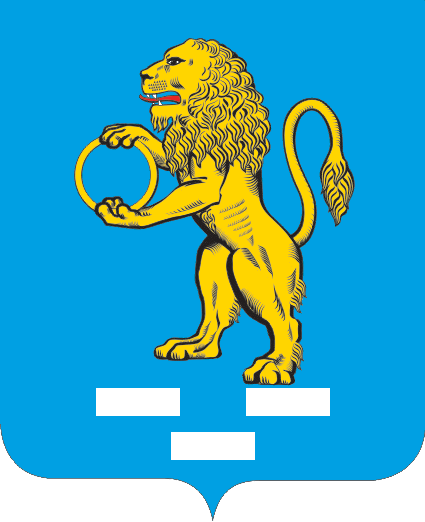
Nelidovo

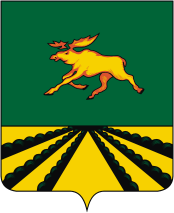
Olenino

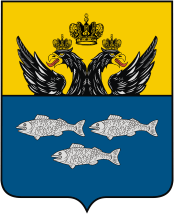
Ostashkov

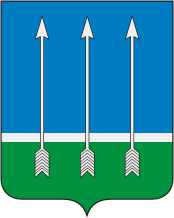
Ozyorny

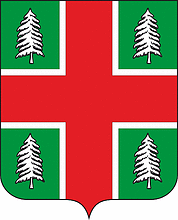
Rameshki

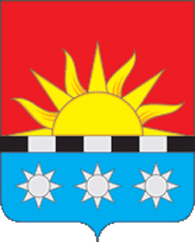
Redkino

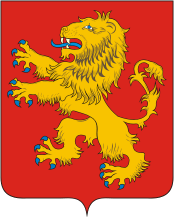
Rzhev

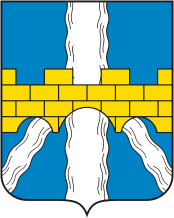
Selizharovo

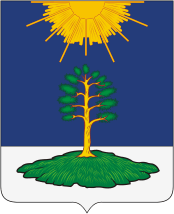
Solnechny

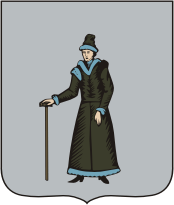
Staritsa

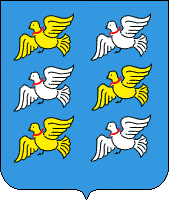
Torzhok

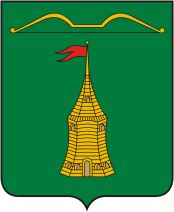
Toropets

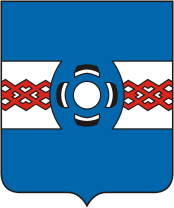
Udomlya

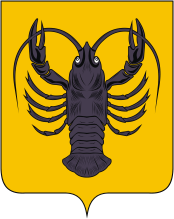
Vesyegonsk

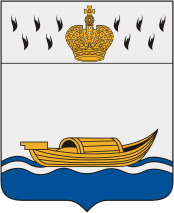
Vyshny Volochyok

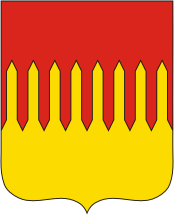
Zubtsov

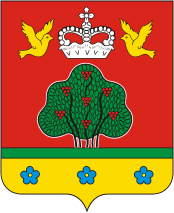
Bezhetsky District

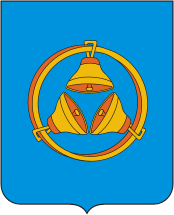
Bologovsky District

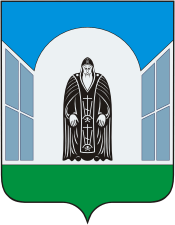
Firovsky District

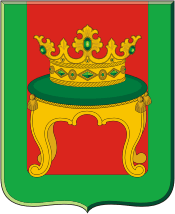
Kalininsky District

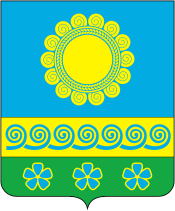
Kimrsky District

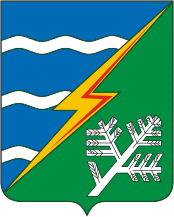
Konakovsky District

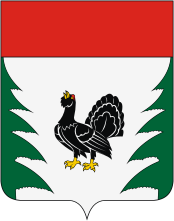
Lesnoy District

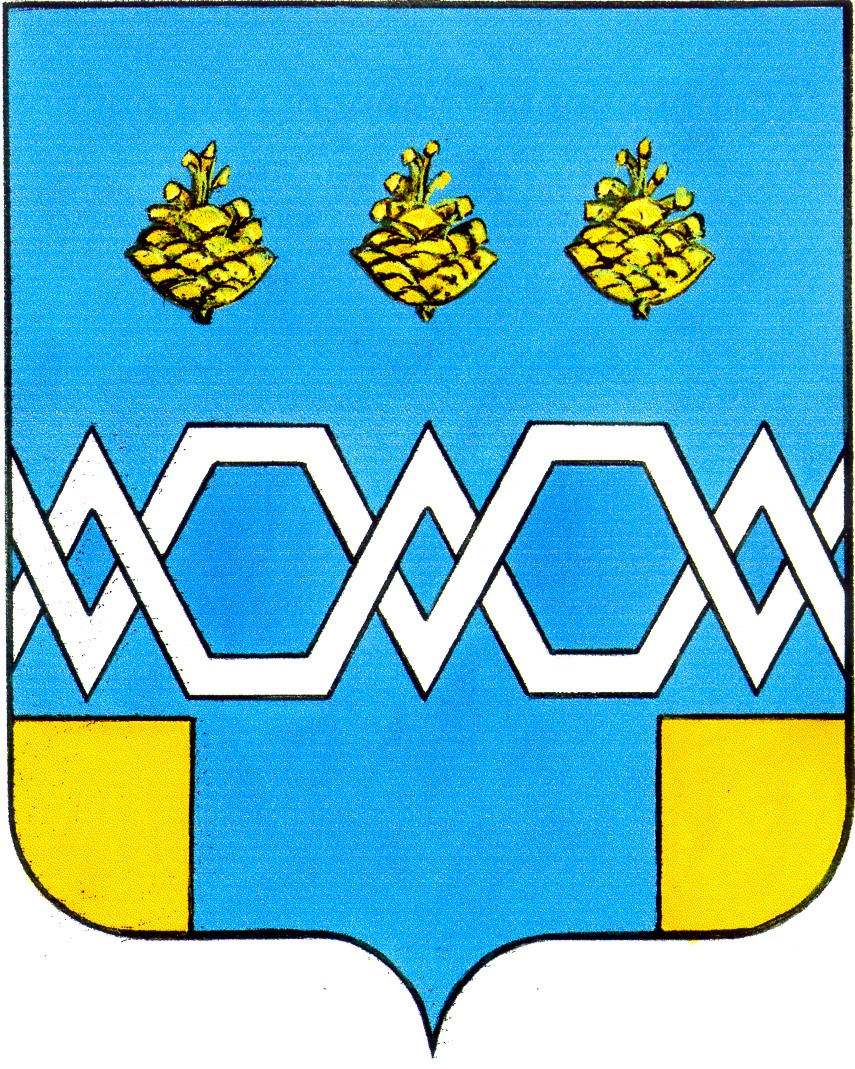
Maksatikhinsky District

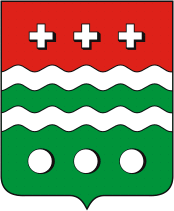
Molokovsky District

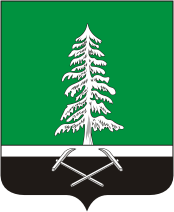
Nelidovsky District

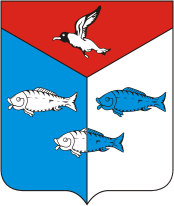
Penovsky District

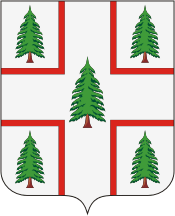
Rameshkovsky District

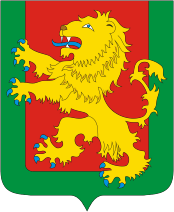
Rzhevsky District

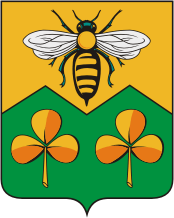
Sandovsky District

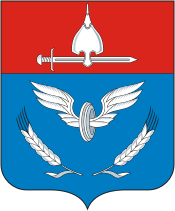
Sonkovsky District

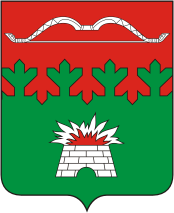
Spirovsky District

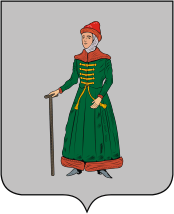
Staritsky District

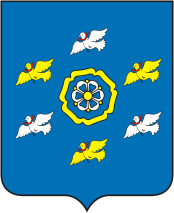
Torzhoksky District

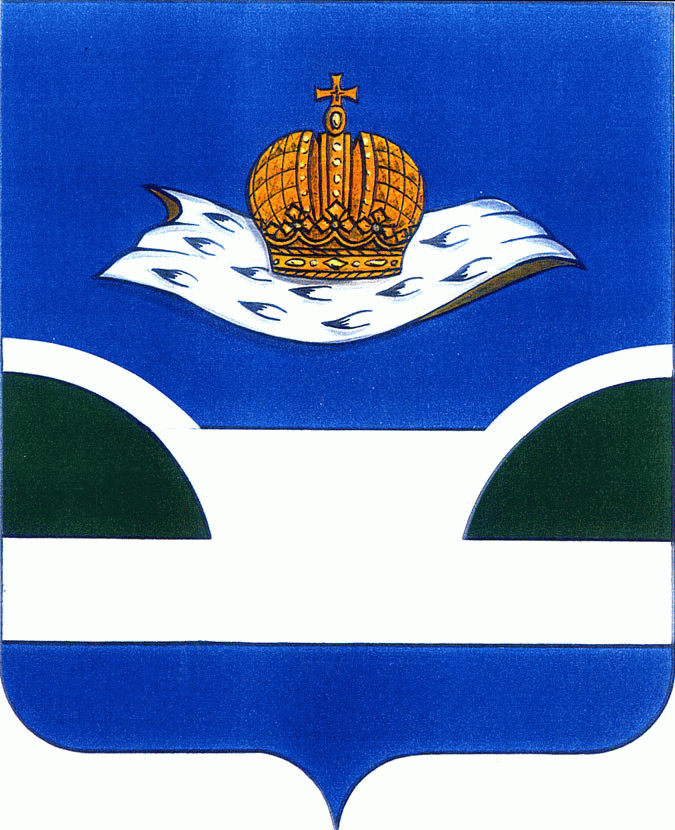
Vyshnevolotsky District

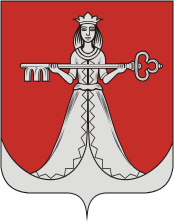
Zapadnodvinsky District

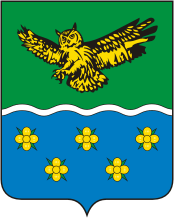
Zharkovsky District

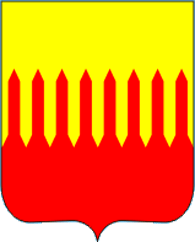
Zubtsovsky District

== Tula Oblast ==
Tula

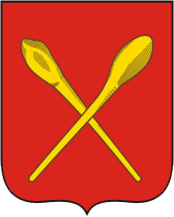
Aleksin

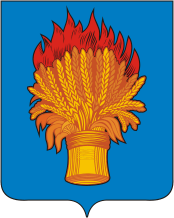
Belyov

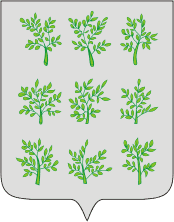
Bogoroditsk

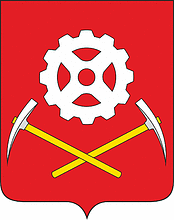
Bolokhovo

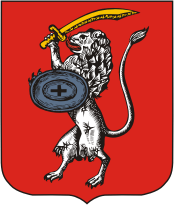
Chekalin

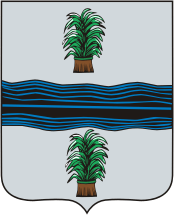
Chern

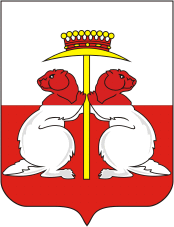
Donskoy

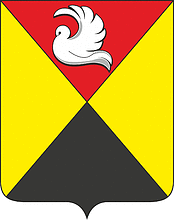
Kimovsk

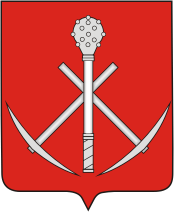
Kireyevsk

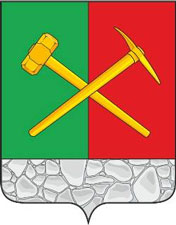
Novogurovsky

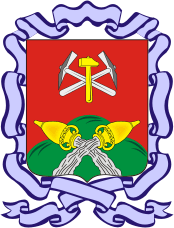
Novomoskovsk

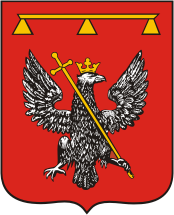
Odoyev

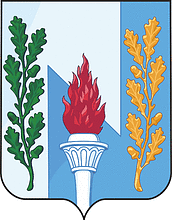
Pervomaysky

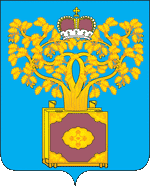
Plavsk

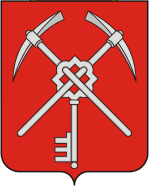
Shchyokino

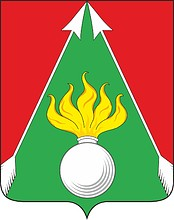
Slavny

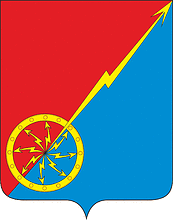
Sovetsk, Tula Oblast

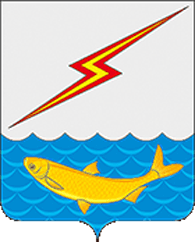
Suvorov

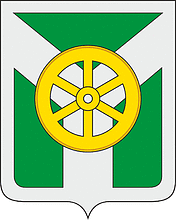
Uzlovaya

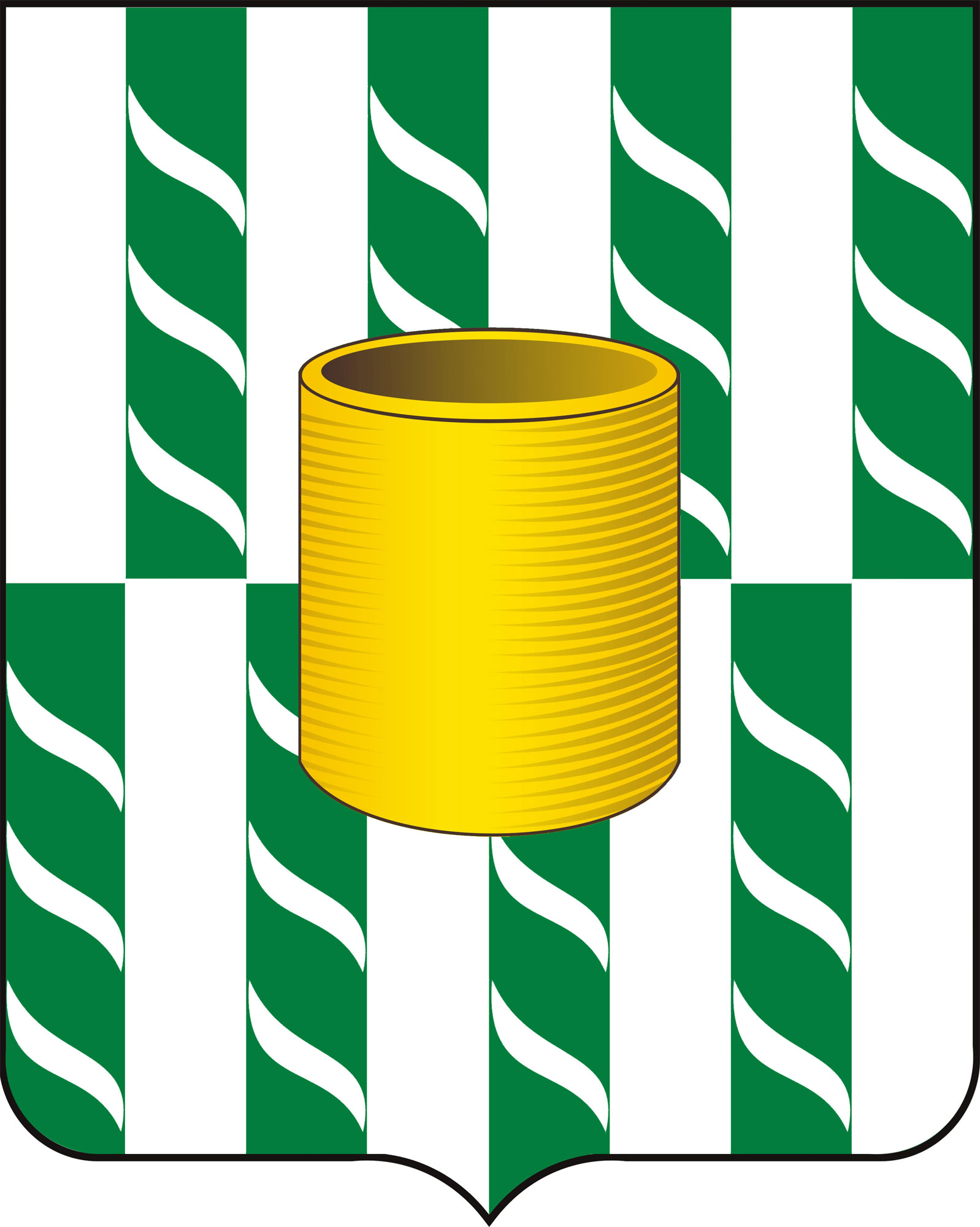
Venyov

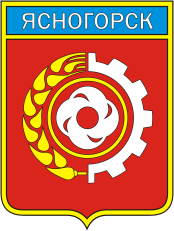
Yasnogorsk

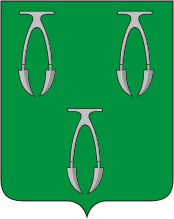
Yefremov

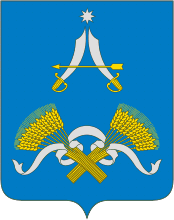
Arsenyevsky District

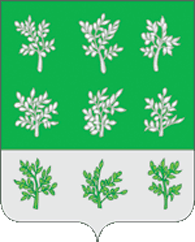
Bogoroditsky District

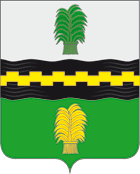
Chernsky District

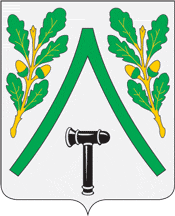
Dubensky District

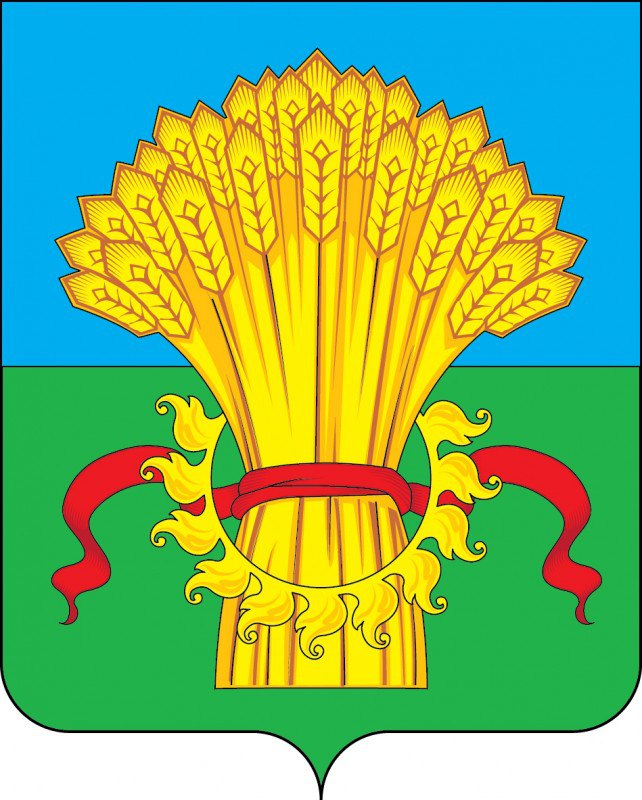
Kamensky District

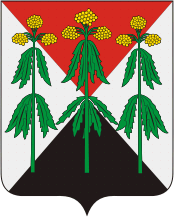
Kimovsky District

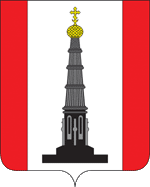
Kurkinsky District

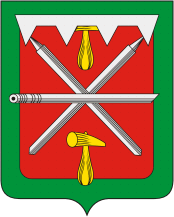
Leninsky District

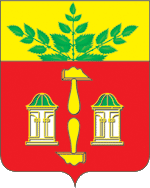
Shchyokinsky District

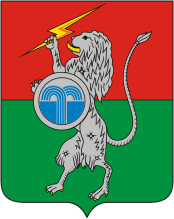
Suvorovsky District

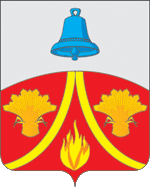
Tyoplo-Ogaryovsky District

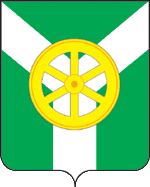
Uzlovsky District

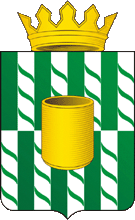
Venyovsky District

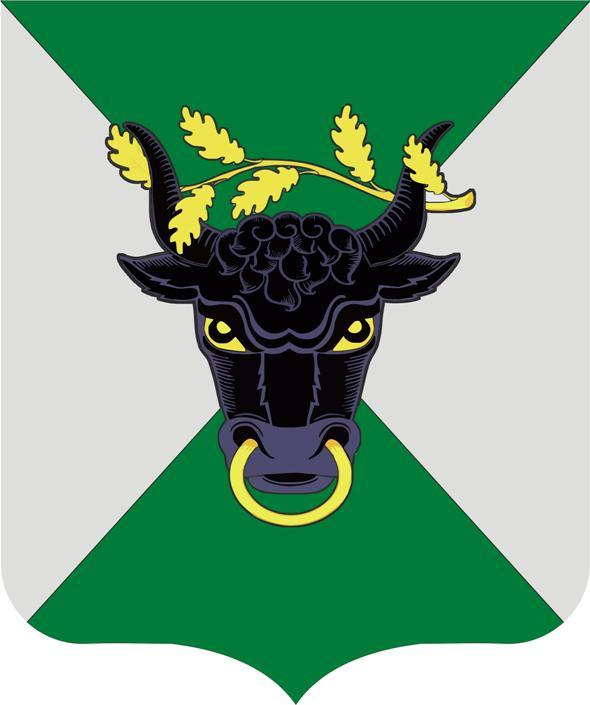
Volovsky District

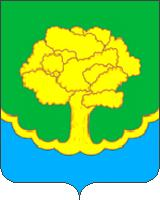
Zaoksky District

== Tyumen Oblast ==
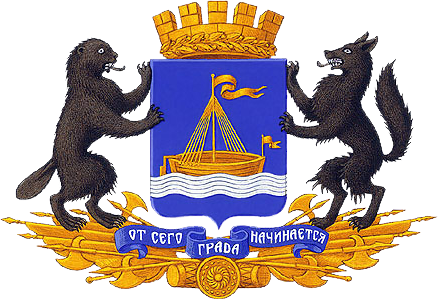
Tyumen

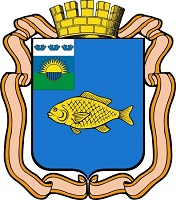
Ishim

Tobolsk

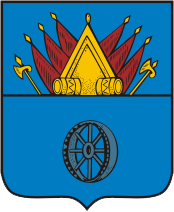
Yalutorovsk

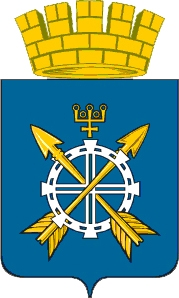
Zavodoukovsk

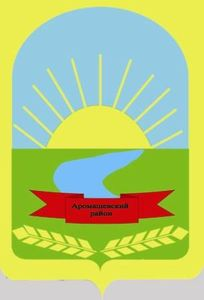
Aromashevsky District

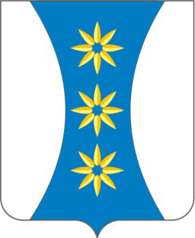
Berdyuzhsky District

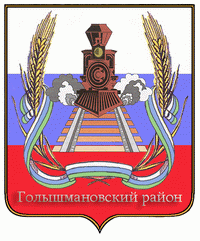
Golyshmanovsky District

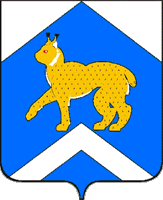
Isetsky District

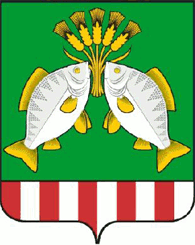
Kazansky District

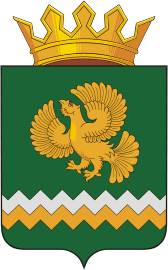
Nizhnetavdinsky District

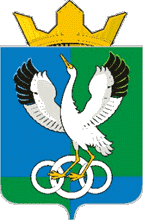
Omutinsky District

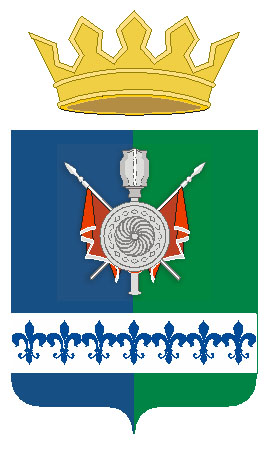
Tobolsky District

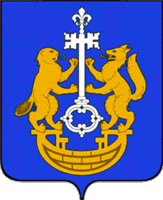
Tyumensky District

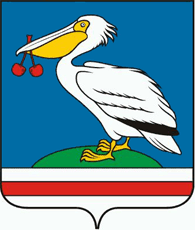
Sladkovsky District

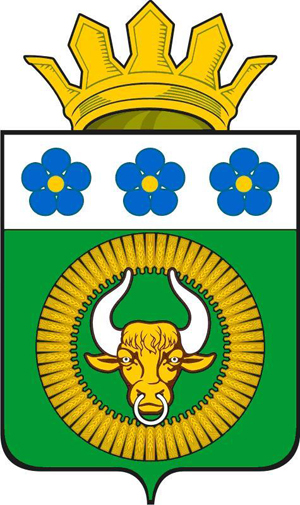
Sorokinsky District

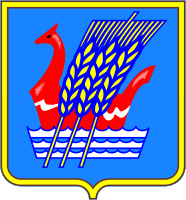
Uporovsky District

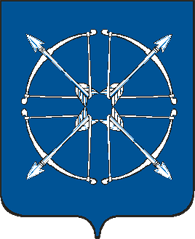
Yalutorovsky District

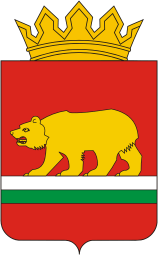
Yarkovsky District

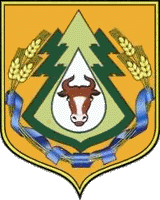
Yurginsky District

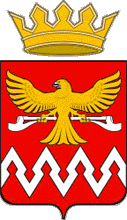
Vikulovsky District

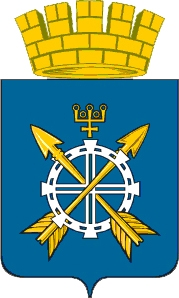
Zavodoukovsky Urban Okrug

== Ulyanovsk Oblast ==
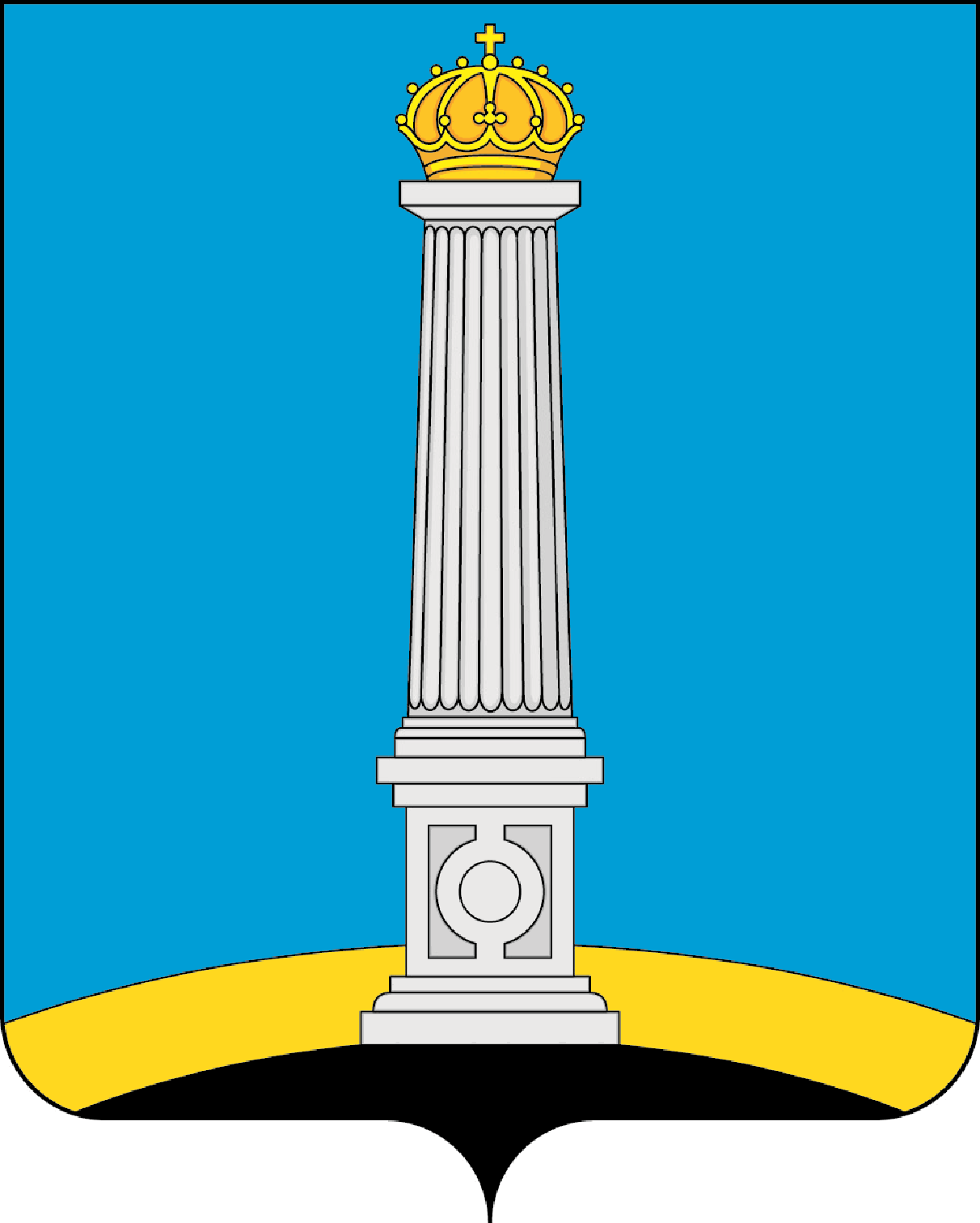
Ulyanovsk

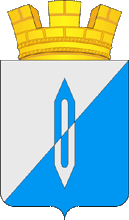
Barysh

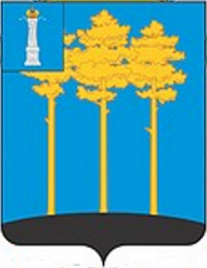
Dimitrovgrad

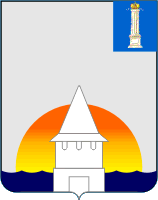
Novoulyanovsk

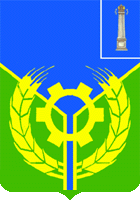
Bazarny Syzgan

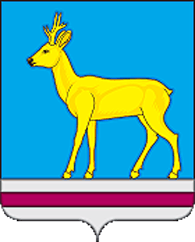
Veshkayma

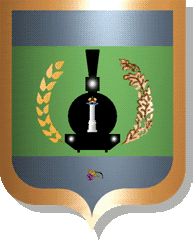
Inza

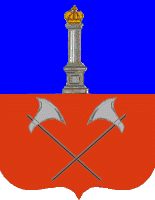
Karsun

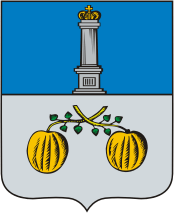
Sengiley

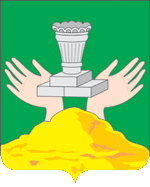
Silikatny

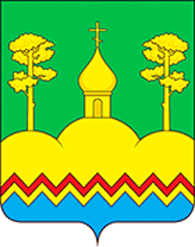
Surskoye

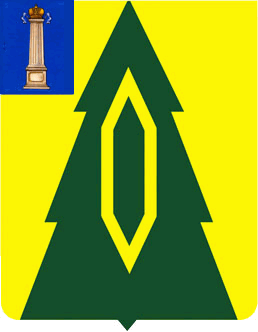
Baryshsky District

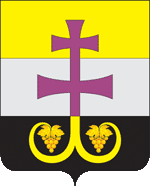
Veshkaymsky District

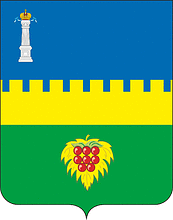
Inzensky District

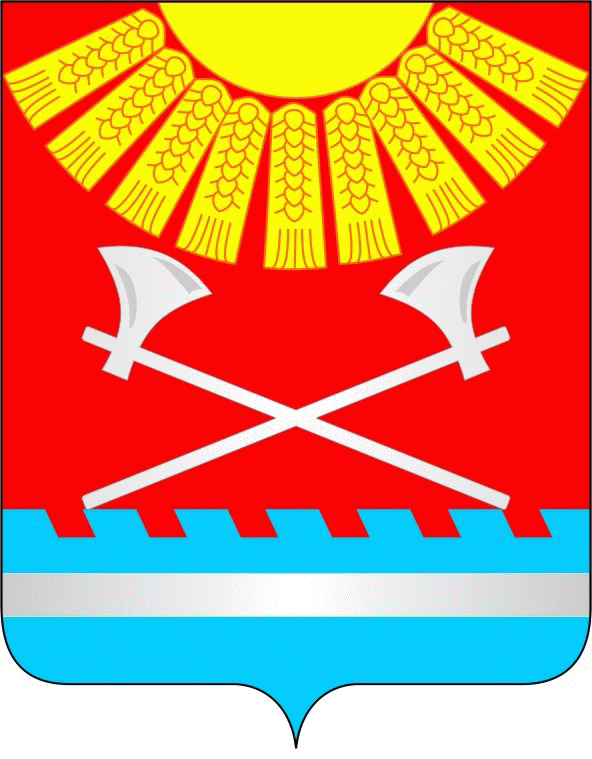
Karsunsky District

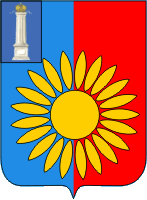
Kuzovatovsky District

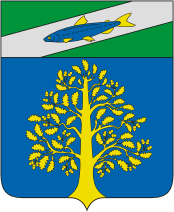
Maynsky District

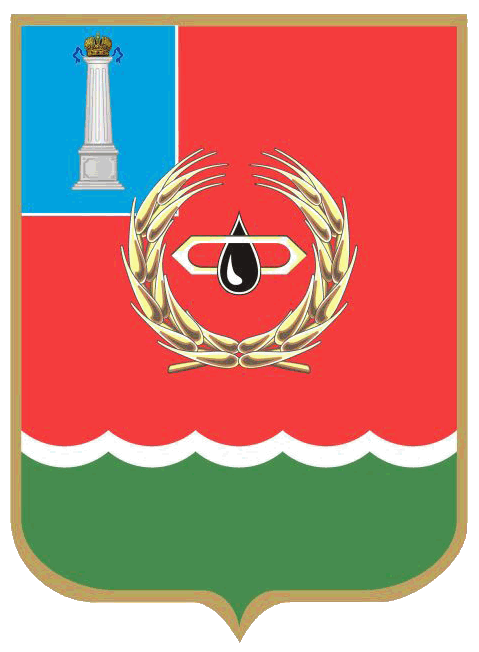
Melekessky District

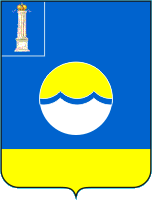
Nikolayevsky District

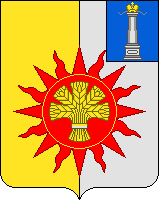
Novomalyklinsky District

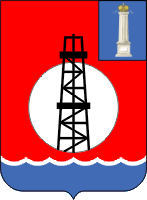
Novospassky District

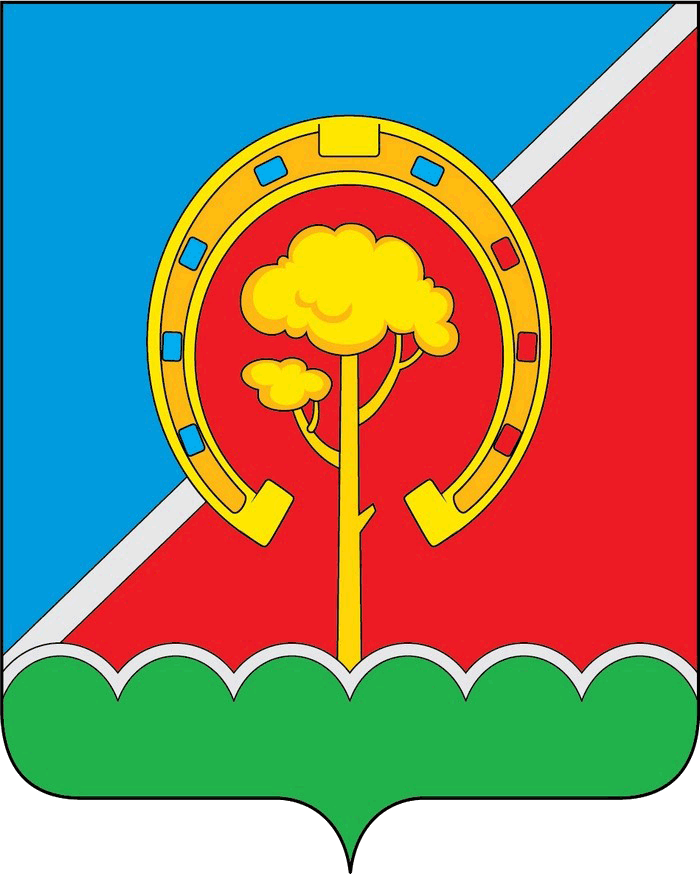
Pavlovsky District

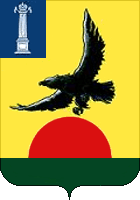
Radishchevsky District

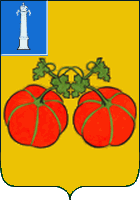
Sengileyevsky District

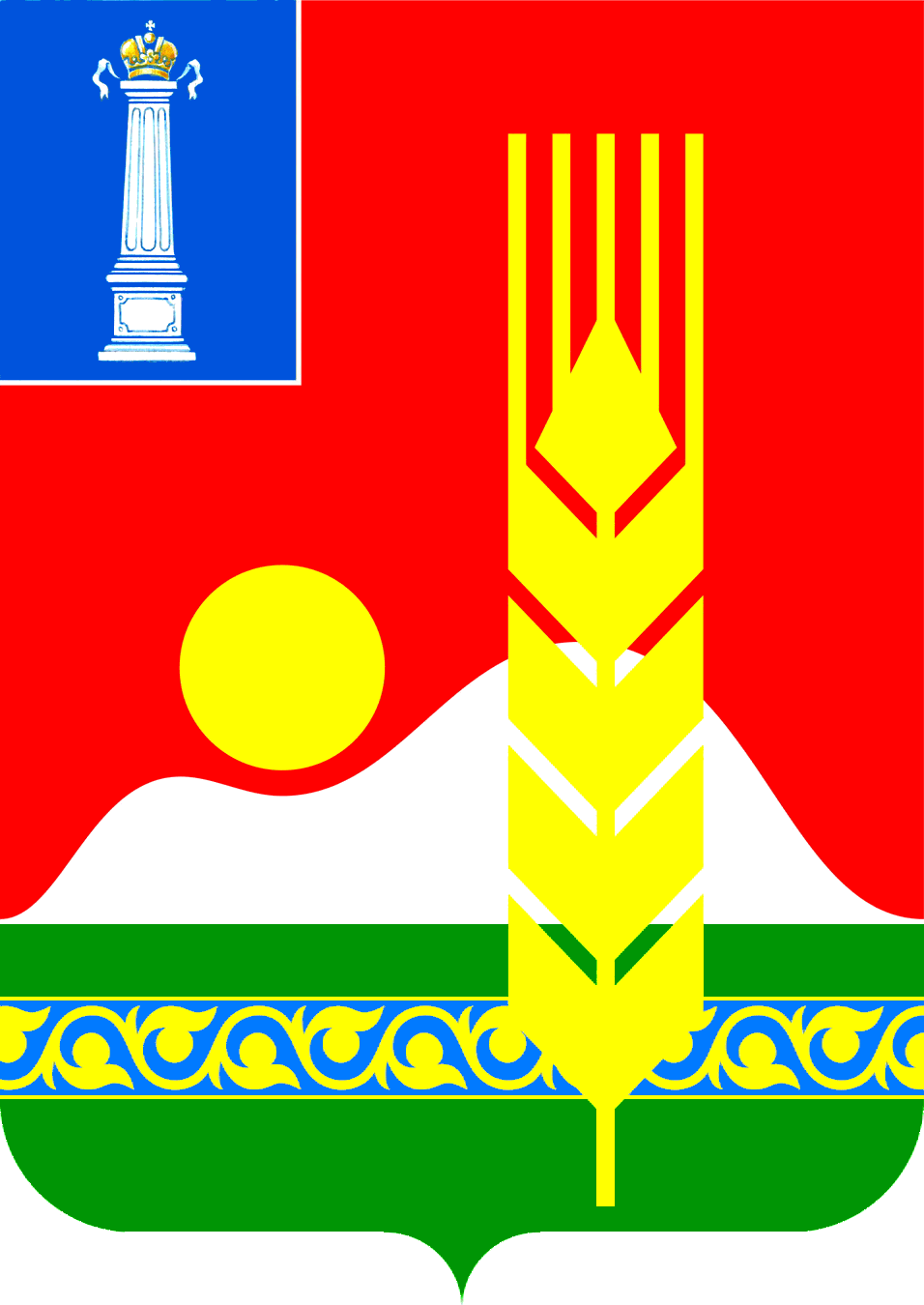
Starokulatkinsky District

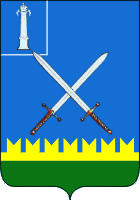
Staromaynsky District

Sursky District

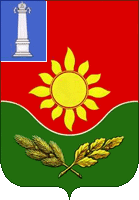
Terengulsky District

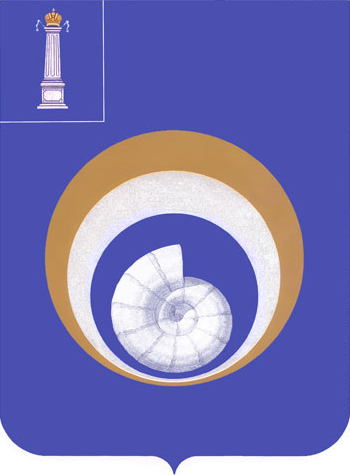
Ulyanovsky District

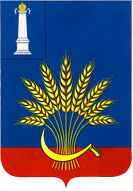
Tsilninsky District

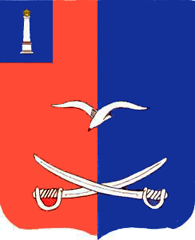
Cherdaklinsky District

== Vladimir Oblast ==
Vladimir

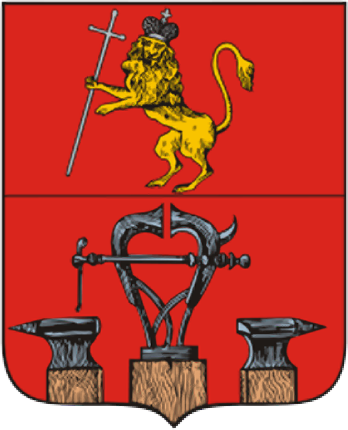
Alexandrov

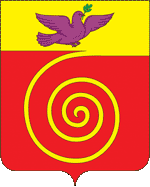
Balakirevo

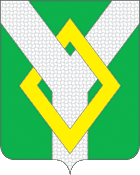
Gorodishchi

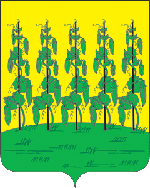
Gorokhovets

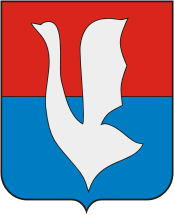
Gusevsky

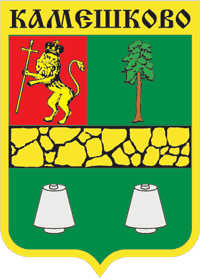
Kameshkovo

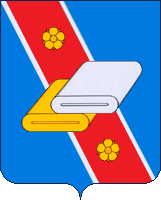
Karabanovo

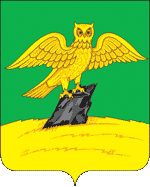
Kirzhach

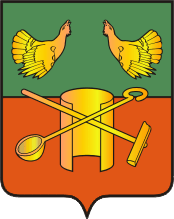
Kolchugino

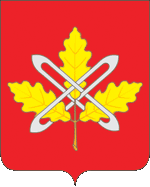
Kosteryovo

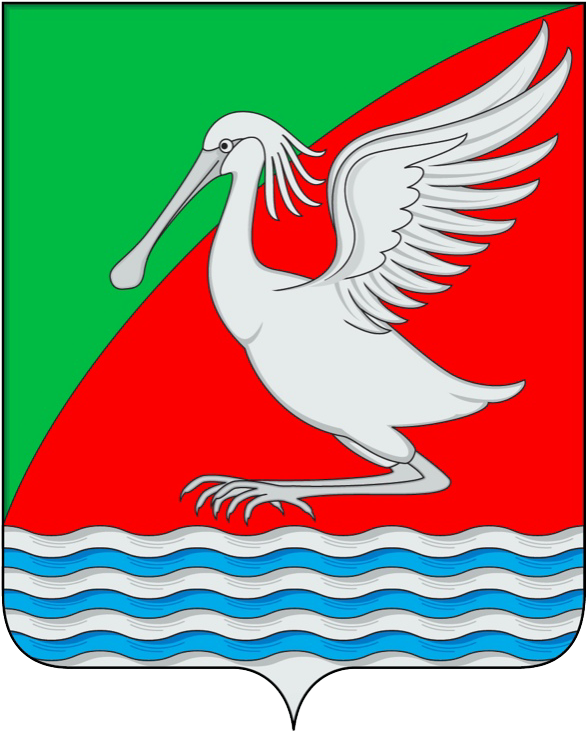
Krasnaya Gorbatka

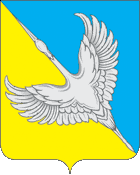
Kurlovo

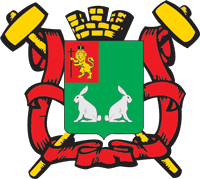
Kovrov

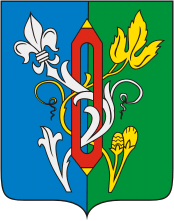
Lakinsk

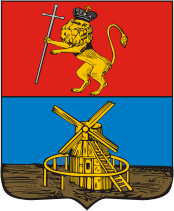
Melenki

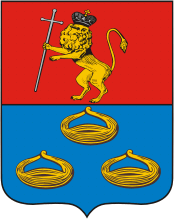
Murom

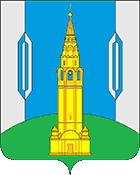
Nikologory

Petushki

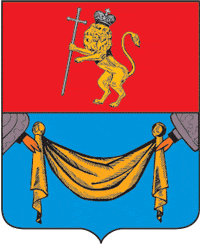
Pokrov

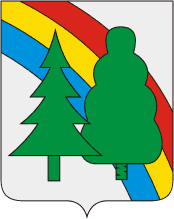
Raduzhny

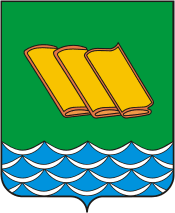
Sobinka

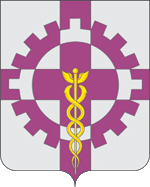
Stavrovo

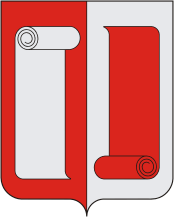
Strunino

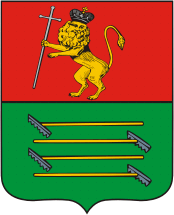
Sudogda

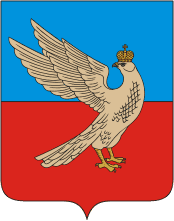
Suzdal

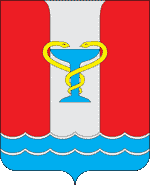
Volginsky

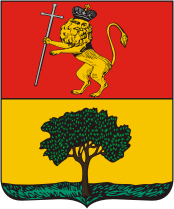
Vyazniki

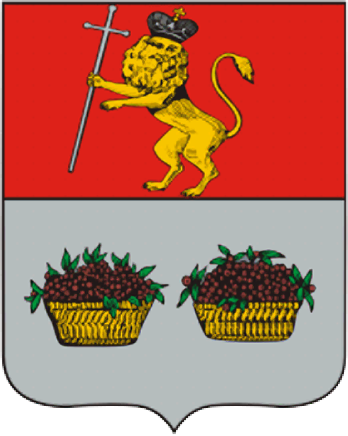
Yuryev-Polsky

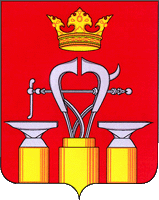
Alexandrovsky District

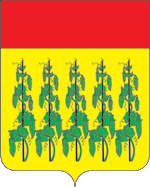
Gorokhovetsky District

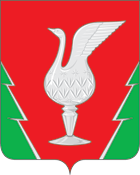
Gus-Khrustalny District

Kameshkovsky District

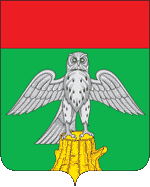
Kirzhachsky District

Melenkovsky District

Selivanovsky District

Sobinsky District

Suzdalsky District

== Volgograd Oblast ==
Volgograd

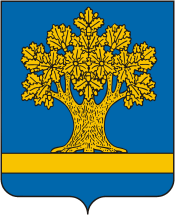
Dubovka

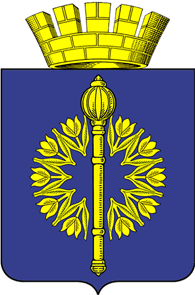
Frolovo

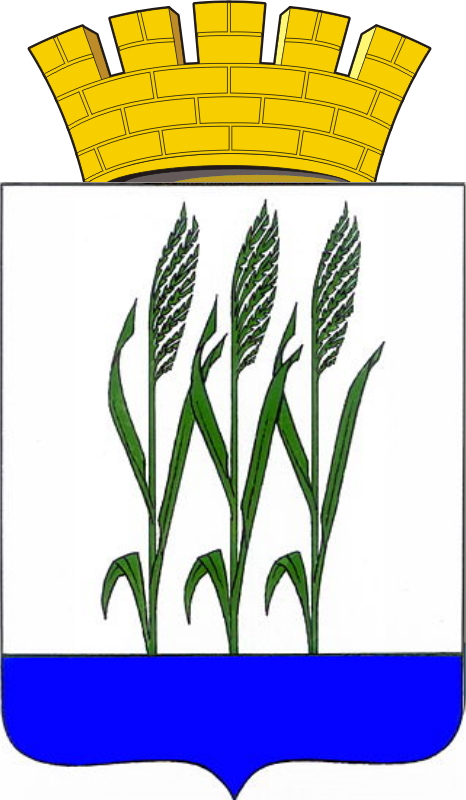
Kamyshin

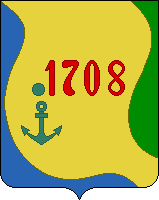
Kalach-na-Donu

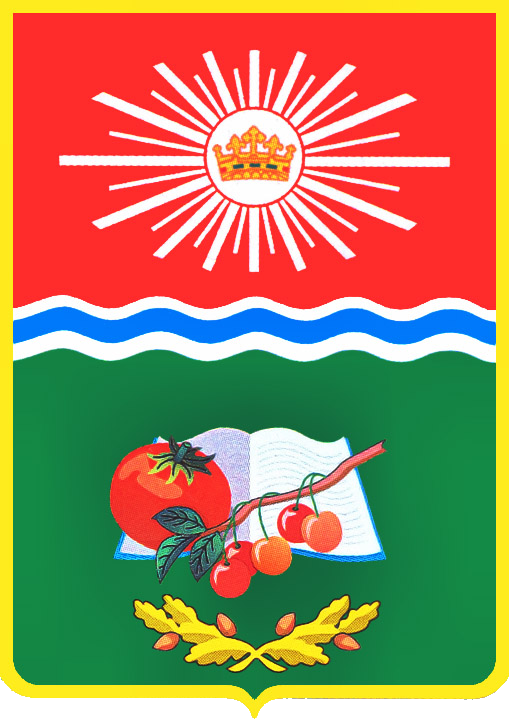
Krasnoslobodsk

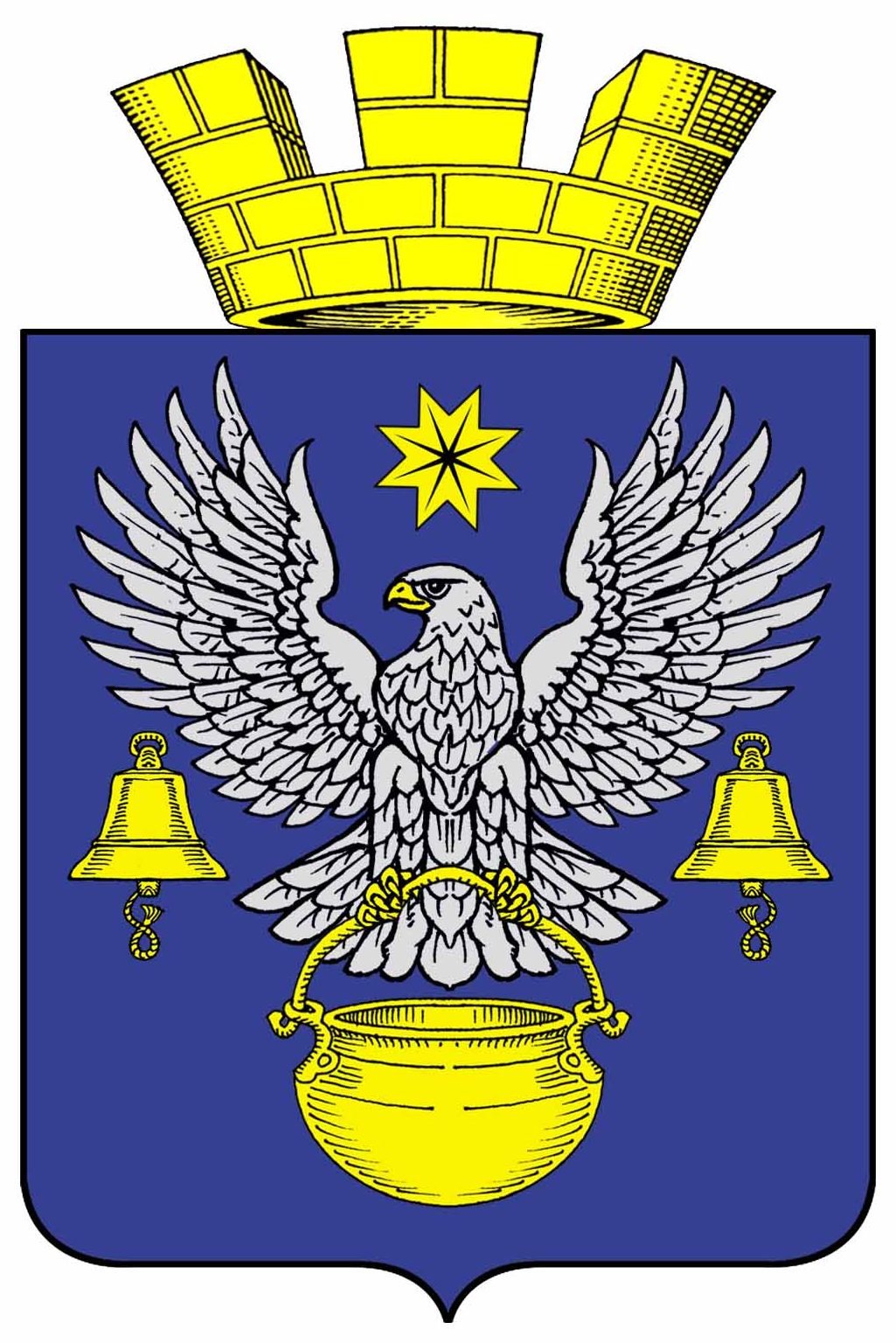
Kotelnikovo

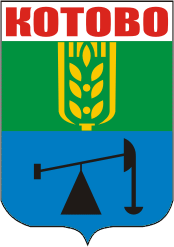
Kotovo

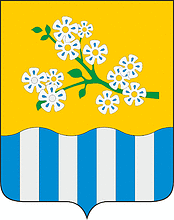
Leninsk

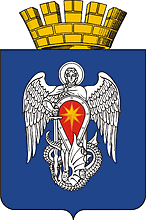
Mikhaylovka

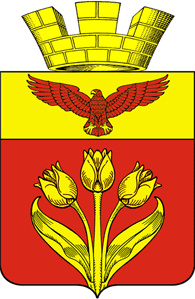
Pallasovka

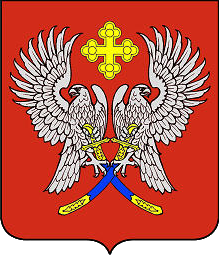
Surovikino

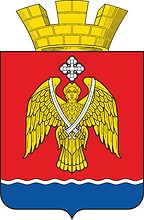
Serafimovich

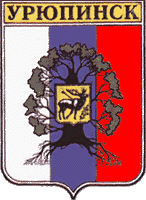
Uryupinsk

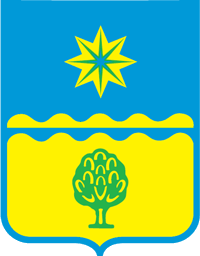
Volzhsky

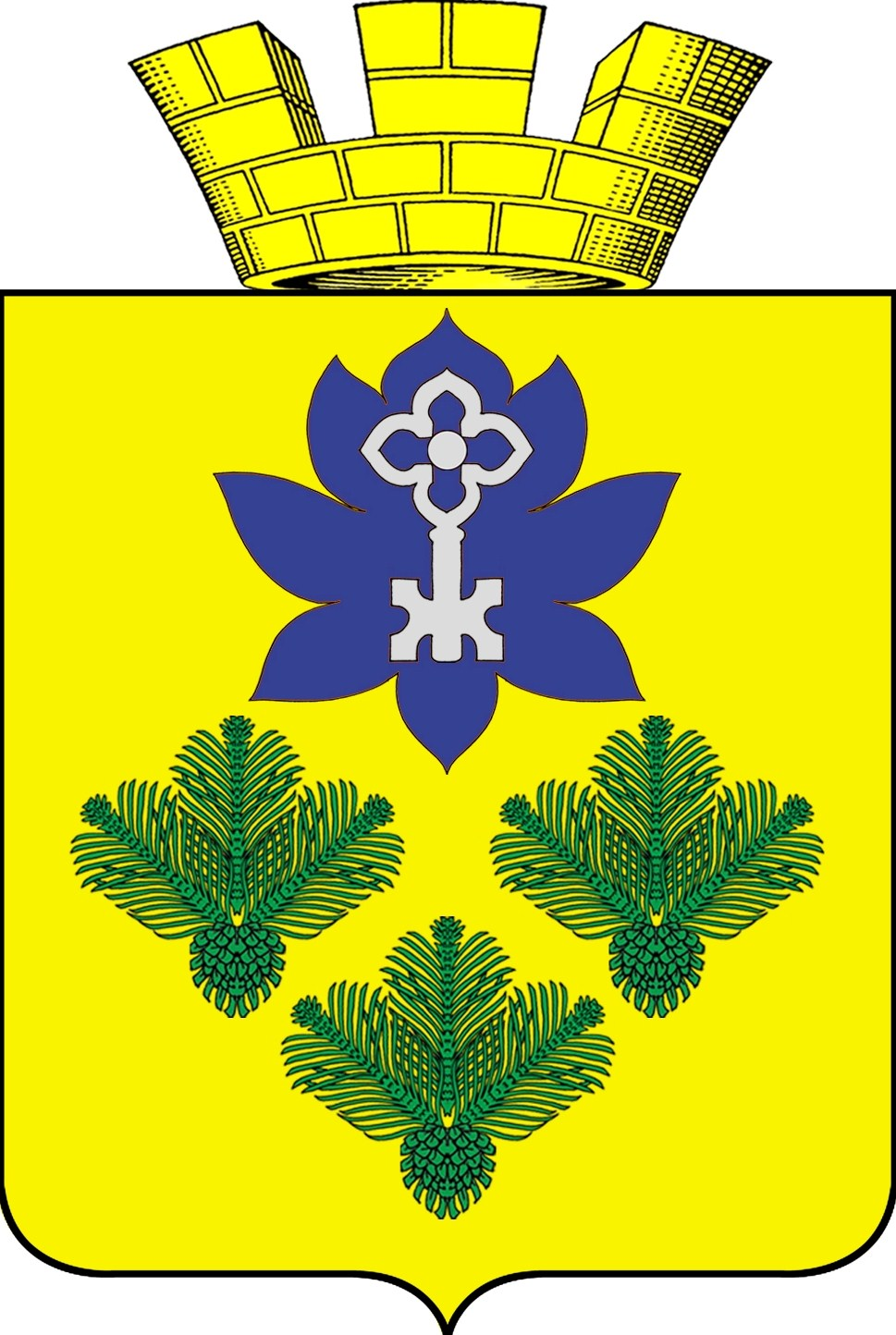
Zhirnovsk

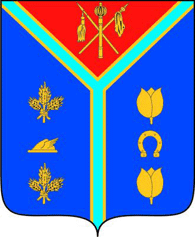
Alexeyevsky District

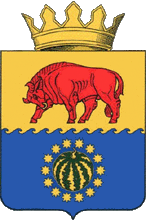
Bykovsky District

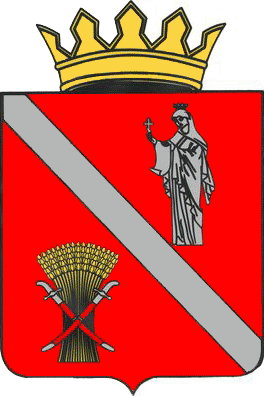
Chernyshkovsky District

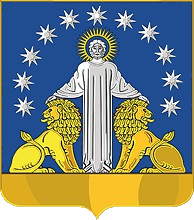
Danilovsky District

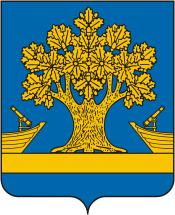
Dubovsky District

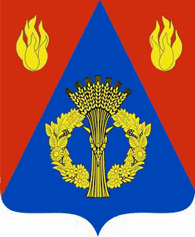
Frolovsky District

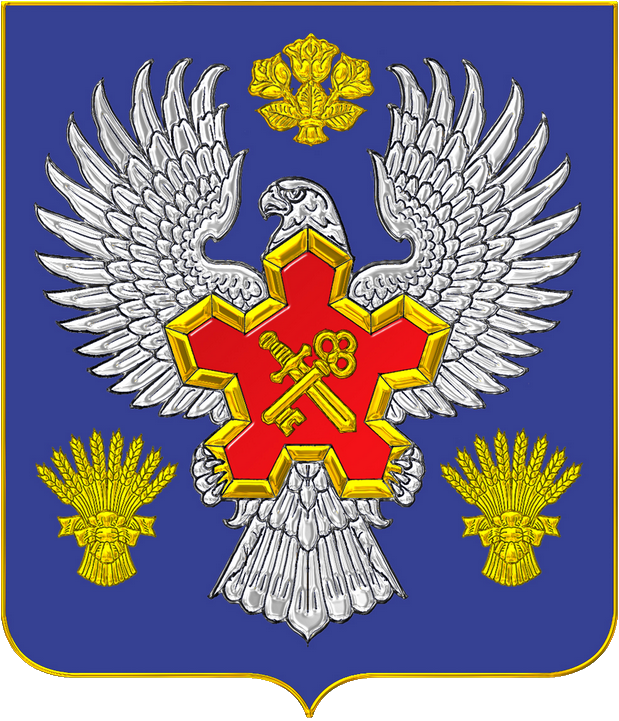
Gorodishchensky District

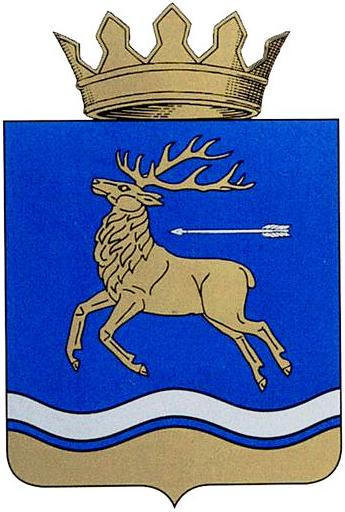
Ilovlinsky District

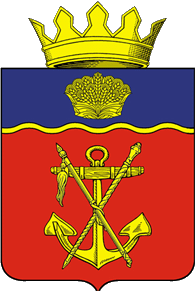
Kalachyovsky District

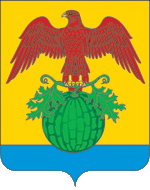
Kamyshinsky District

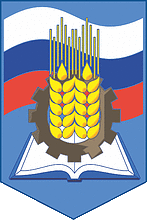
Kikvidzensky District

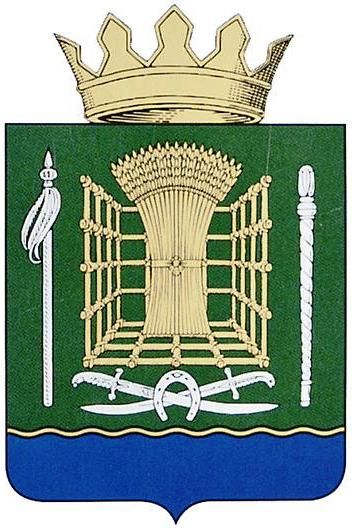
Kletsky District

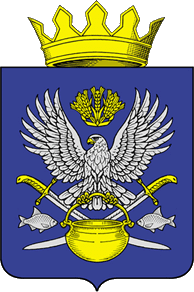
Kotelnikovsky District

Kumylzhensky District

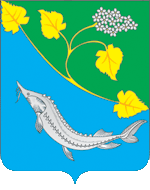
Leninsky District

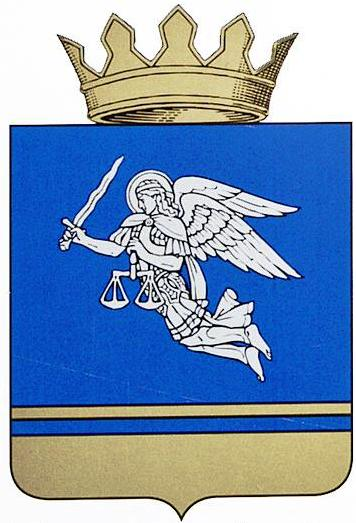
Mikhaylovsky District

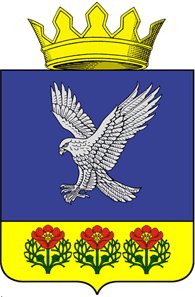
Nekhayevsky District

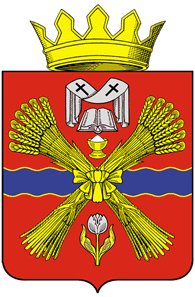
Nikolayevsky District

Novoanninsky District

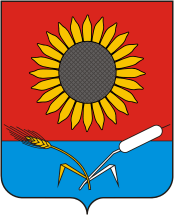
Novonikolayevsky District

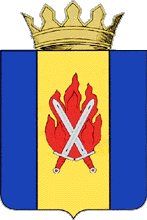
Oktyabrsky District

Pallasovsky District

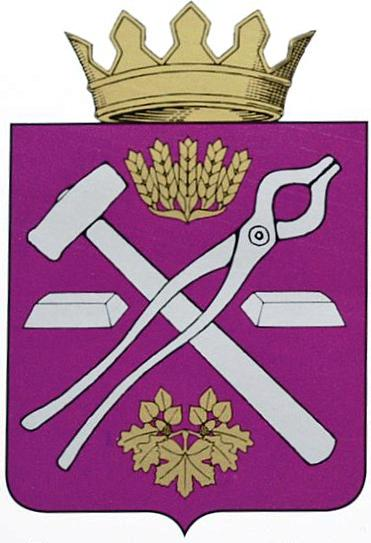
Rudnyansky District

Serafimovichsky District

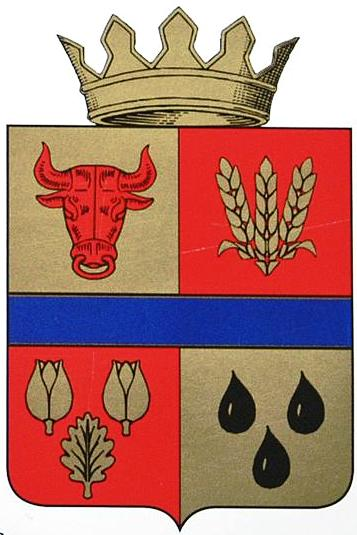
Staropoltavsky District

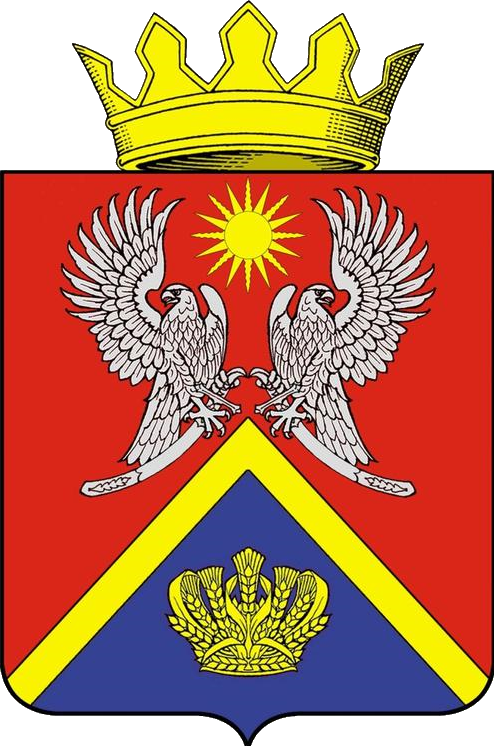
Surovikinsky District

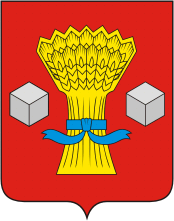
Svetloyarsky District

Uryupinsky District

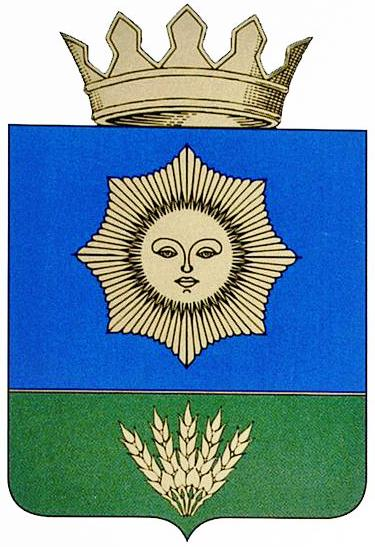
Yelansky District

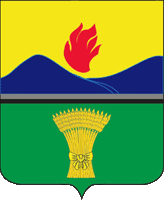
Zhirnovsky District

== Vologda Oblast ==
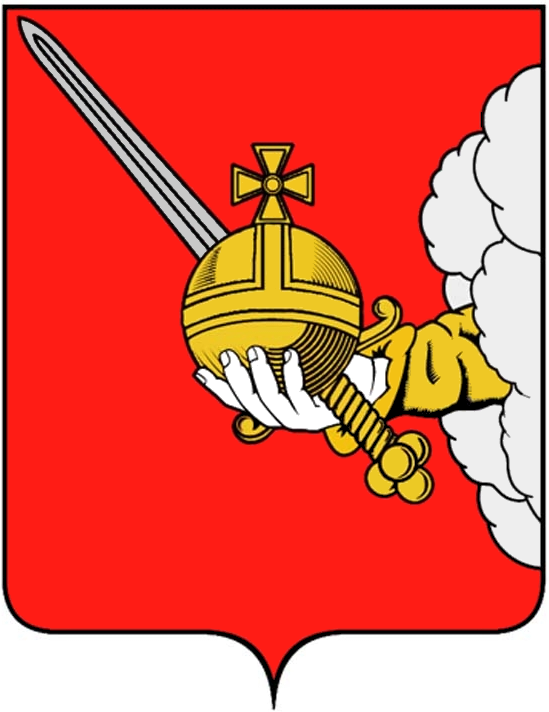
Vologda

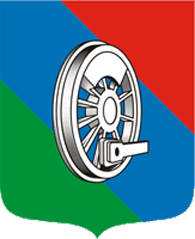
Babayevo

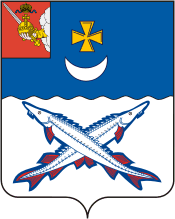
Belozersk

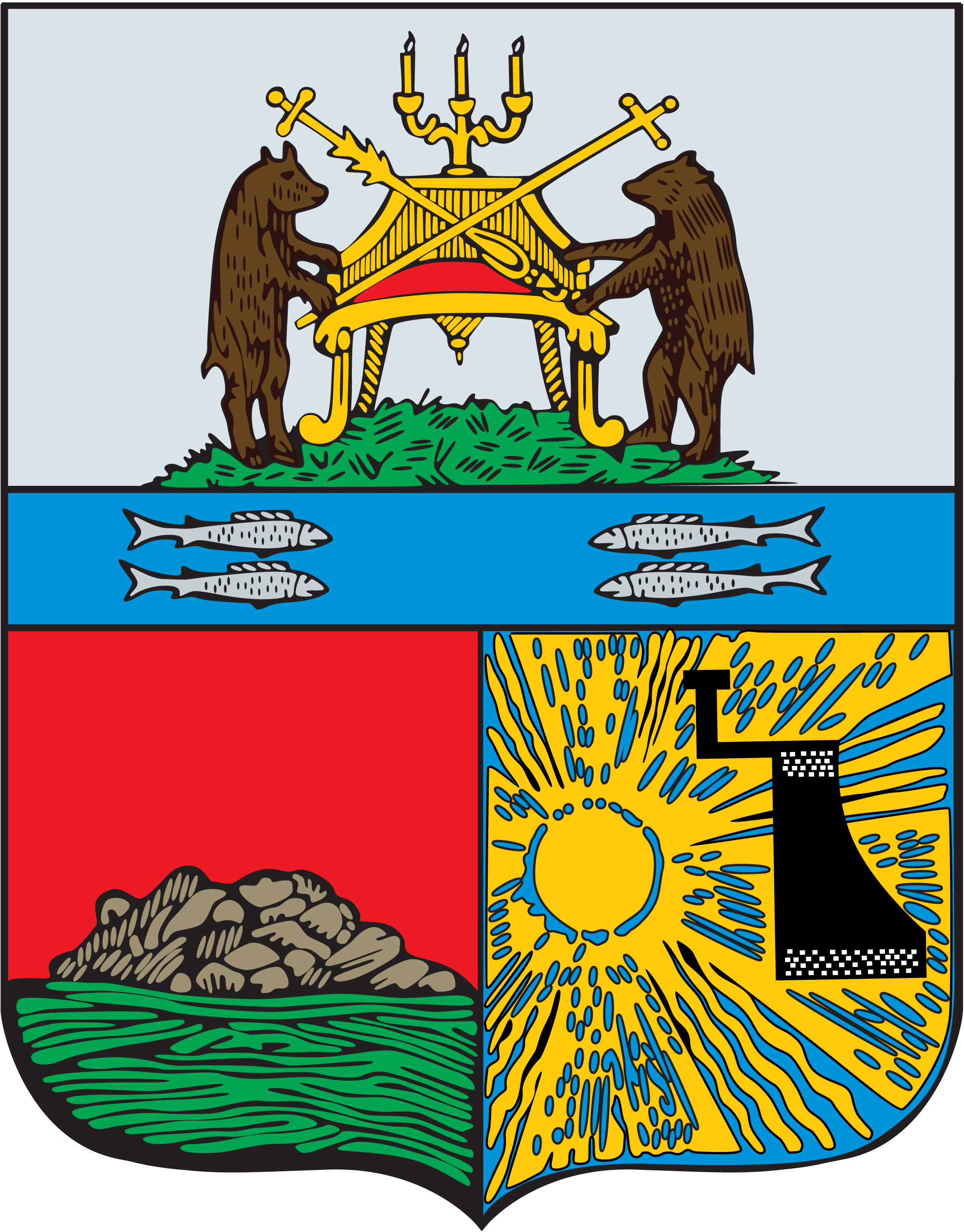
Cherepovets

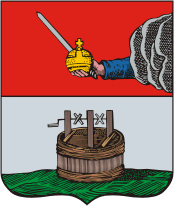
Gryazovets

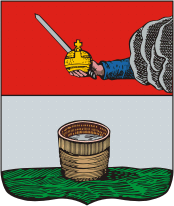
Kadnikov

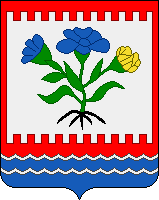
Krasavino

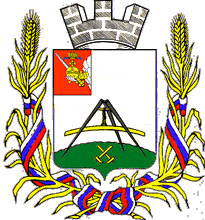
Kirillov

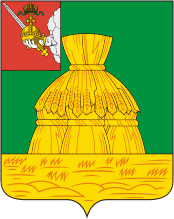
Nikolsk

Sheksna

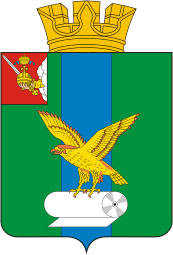
Sokol

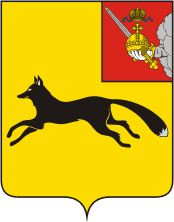
Totma

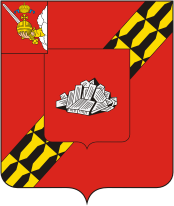
Ustyuzhna

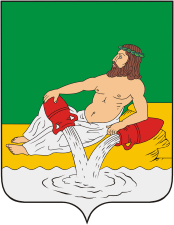
Veliky Ustyug

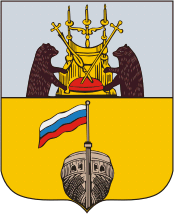
Vytegra

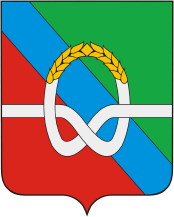
Babayevsky District

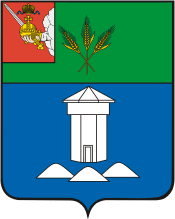
Babushkinsky District

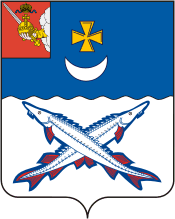
Belozersky District

Chagodoshchensky District

Cherepovetsky District

Gryazovetsky District

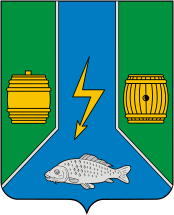
Kaduysky District

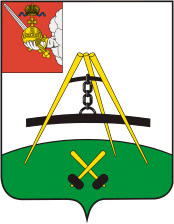
Kirillovsky District

Kichmengsko-Gorodetsky District

Kharovsky District

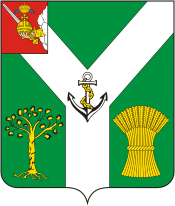
Mezhdurechensky District

Nyuksensky District

Syamzhensky District

Tarnogsky District

Ust-Kubinsky District

Vashkinsky District

Verkhovazhsky District

Vologodsky District

Vozhegodsky District

Vytegorsky District

== Voronezh Oblast ==
Voronezh

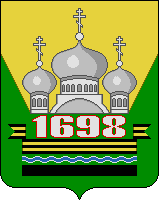
Anna

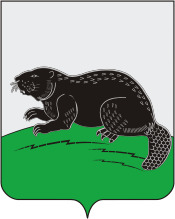
Bobrov

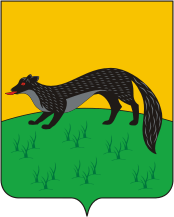
Boguchar

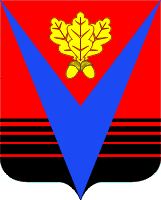
Borisoglebsk

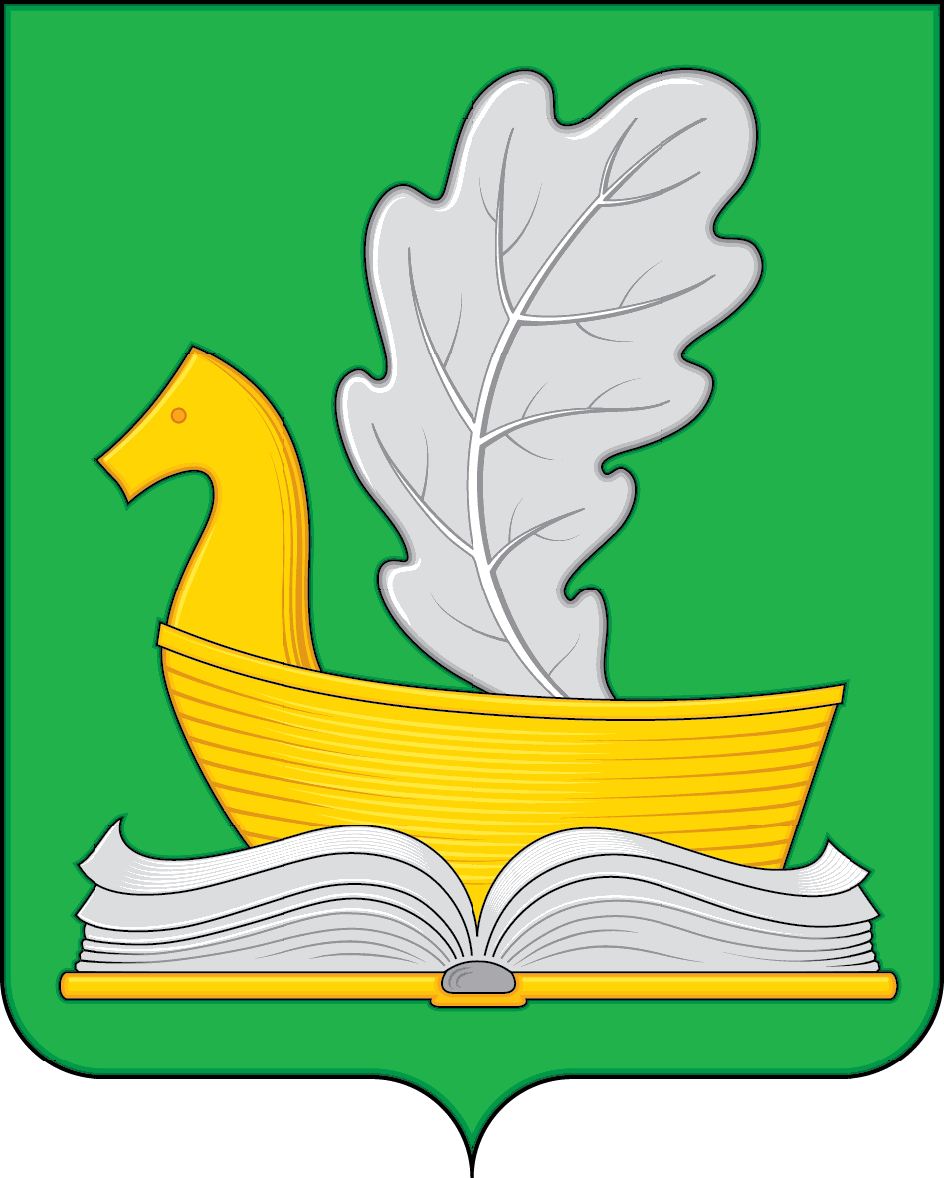
Buturlinovka

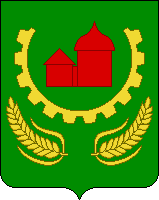
Ertil

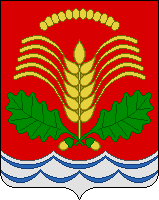
Gribanovsky

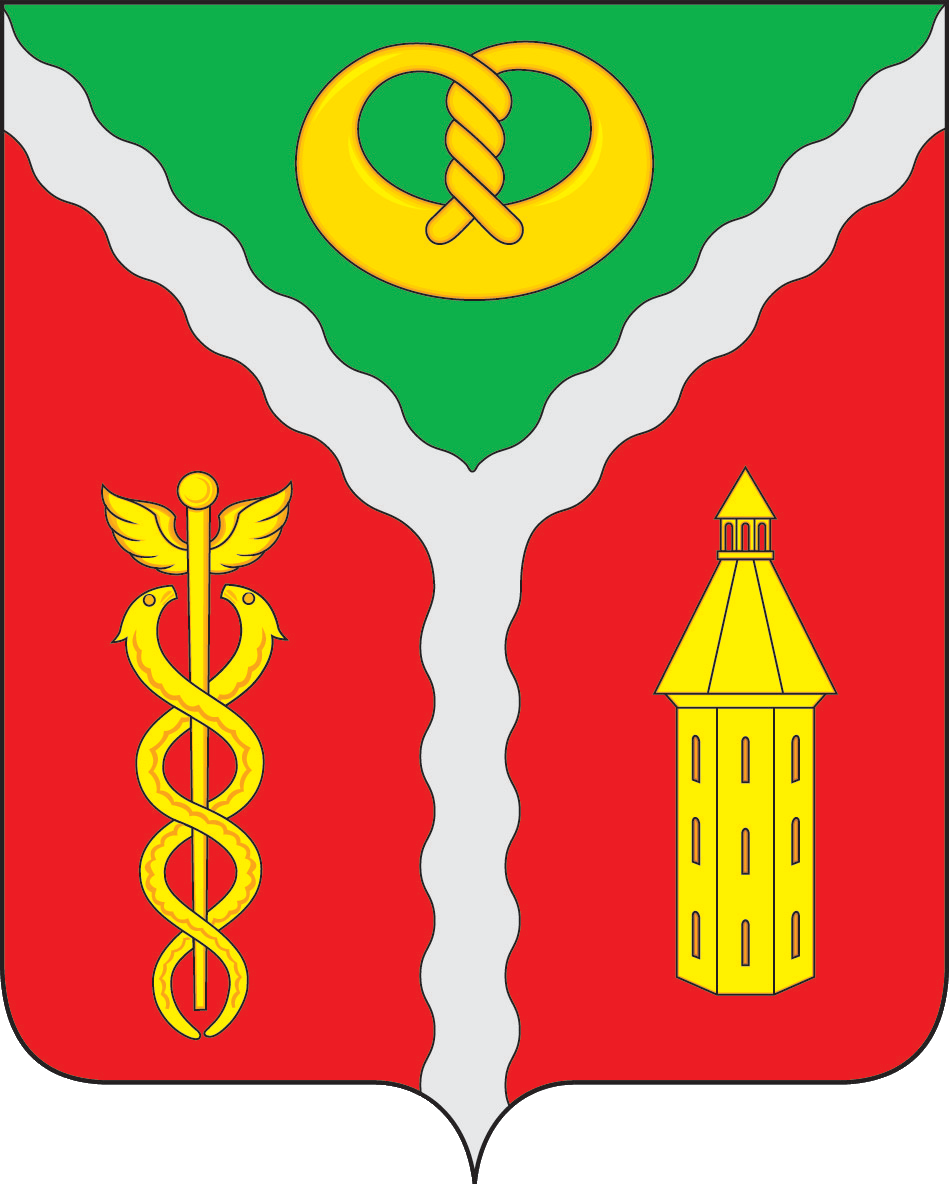
Kalach

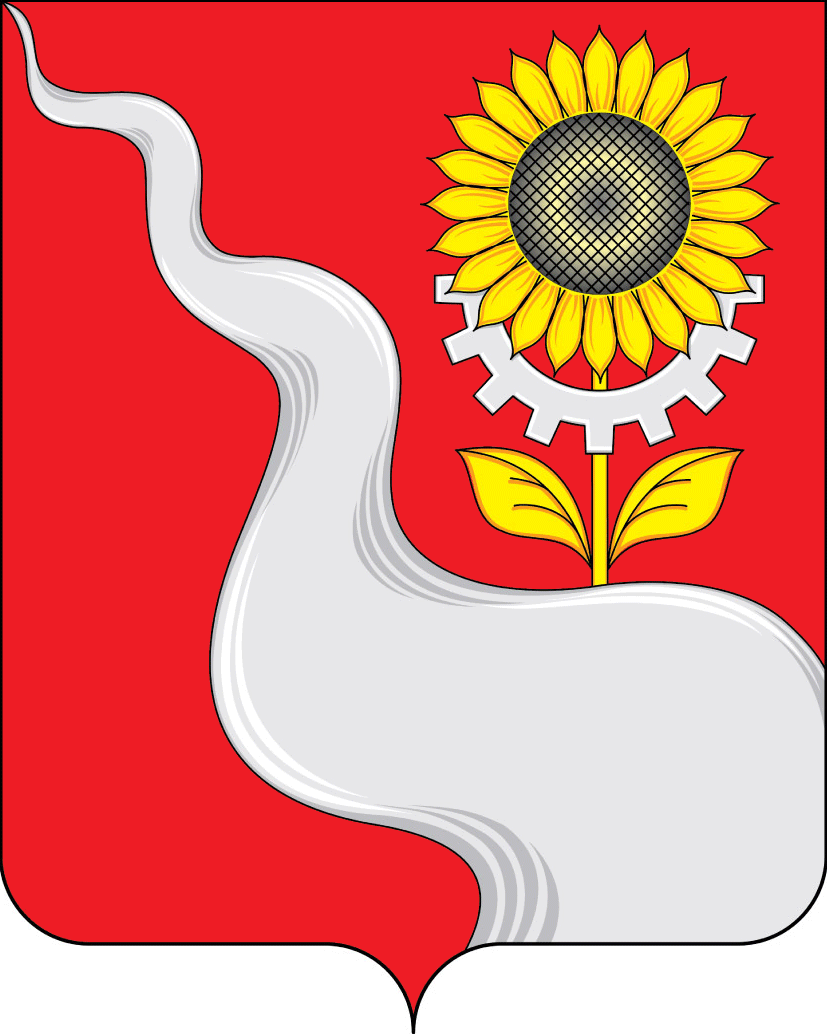
Kamenka

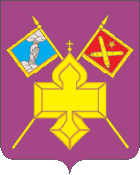
Kantemirovka

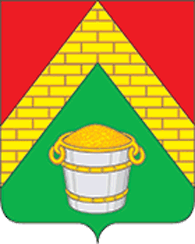
Latnaya

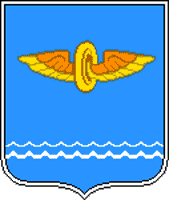
Liski

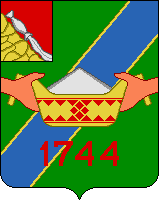
Nizhny Kislyay

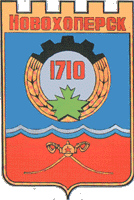
Novokhopyorsk

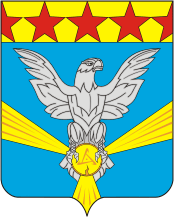
Novovoronezh

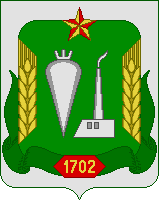
Olkhovatka

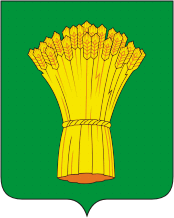
Ostrogozhsk

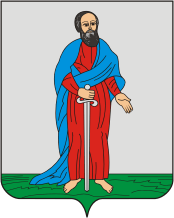
Pavlovsk

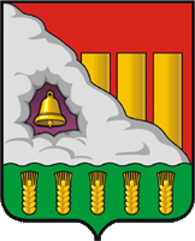
Podgorensky

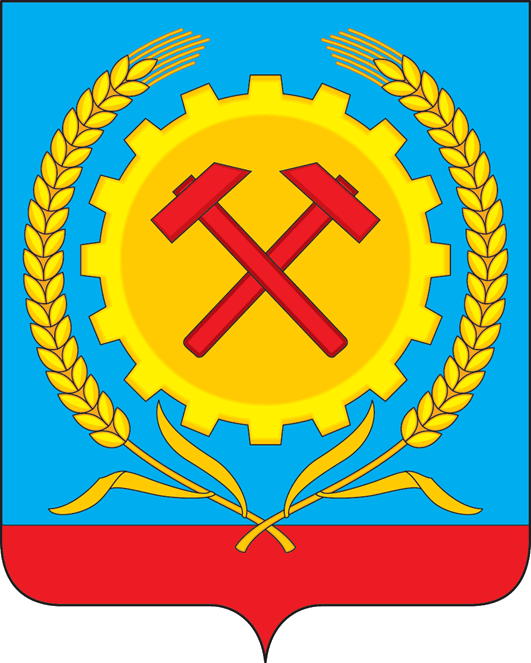
Povorino

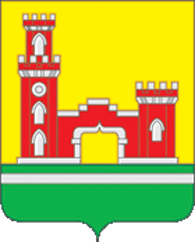
Ramon

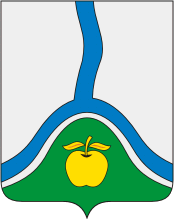
Rossosh

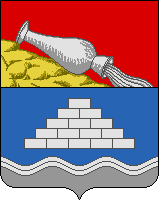
Semiluki

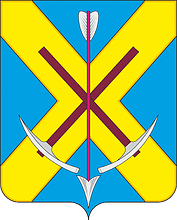
Strelitsa

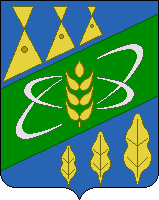
Talovaya

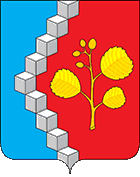
Yelan-Kolenovsky

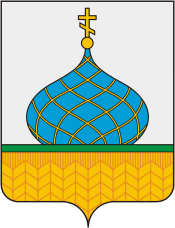
Anninsky District

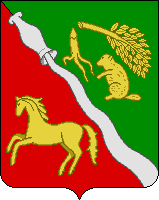
Bobrovsky District

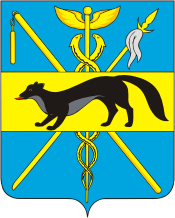
Bogucharsky District

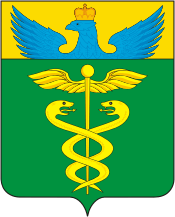
Buturlinovsky District

Ertilsky District

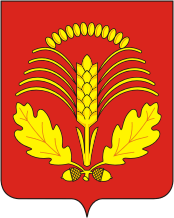
Gribanovsky District

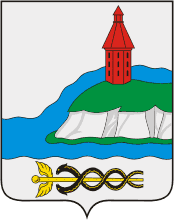
Kalacheyevsky District

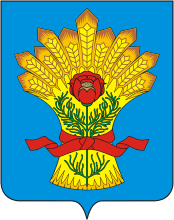
Kamensky District

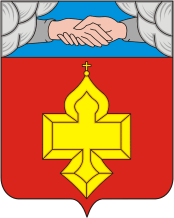
Kantemirovsky District

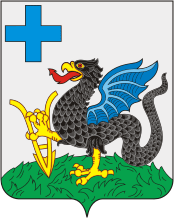
Kashirsky District

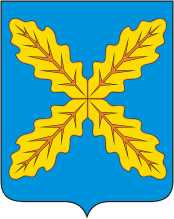
Khokholsky District

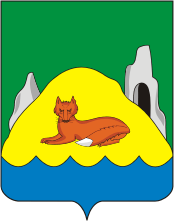
Liskinsky District

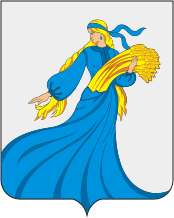
Nizhnedevitsky District

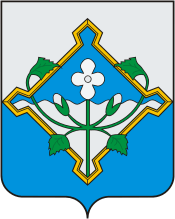
Novokhopyorsky District

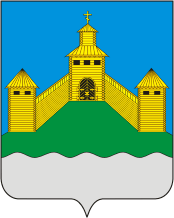
Novousmansky District

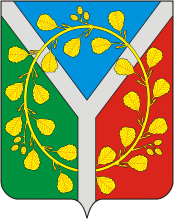
Olkhovatsky District

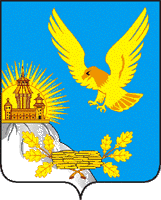
Ostrogozhsky District

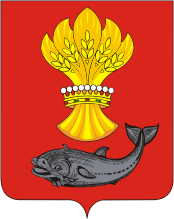
Paninsky District

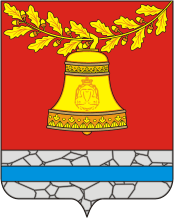
Pavlovsky District

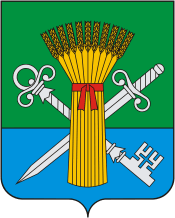
Petropavlovsky District

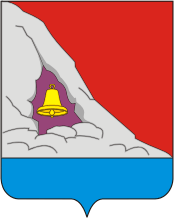
Podgorensky District

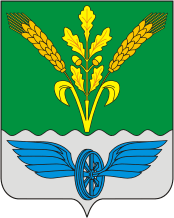
Povorinsky District

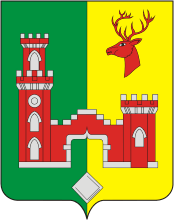
Ramonsky District

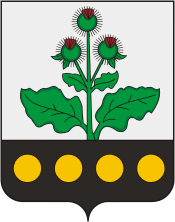
Repyovsky District

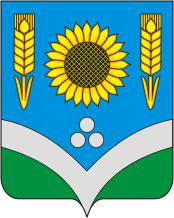
Rossoshansky District

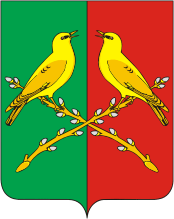
Talovsky District

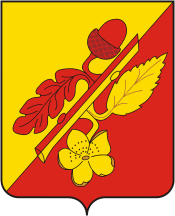
Ternovsky District

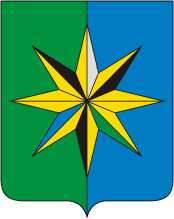
Verkhnekhavsky District

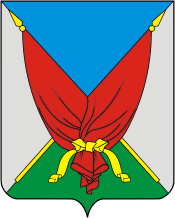
Verkhnemamonsky District

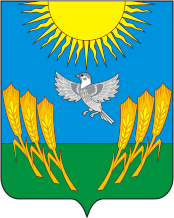
Vorobyovsky District

== Yaroslavl Oblast ==
Yaroslavl

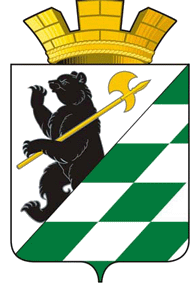
Danilov

Gavrilov-Yam

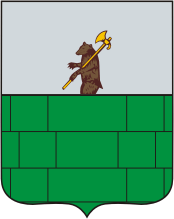
Lyubim

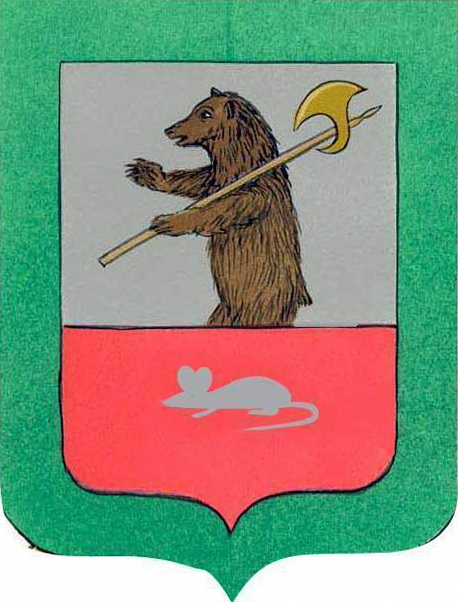
Myshkin

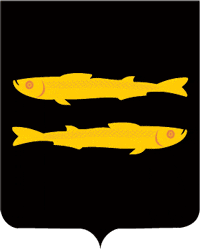
Pereslavl-Zalessky

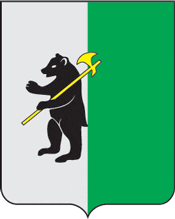
Petrovskoye

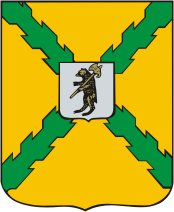
Poshekhonye

Rostov

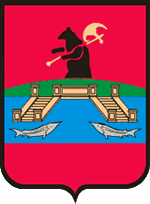
Rybinsk

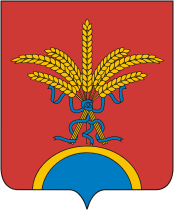
Semibratovo

Tutayev

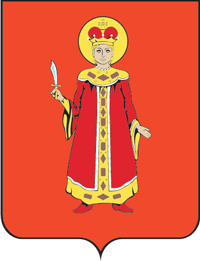
Uglich

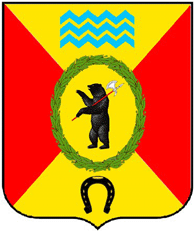
Bolsheselsky District

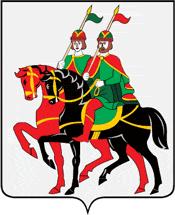
Borisoglebsky District

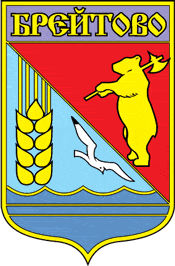
Breytovsky District

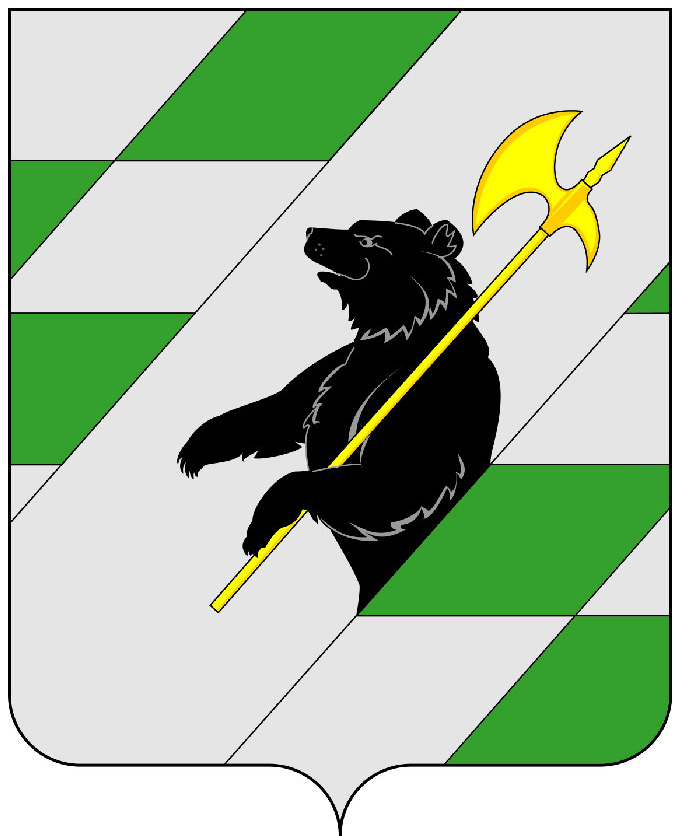
Danilovsky District

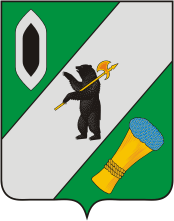
Gavrilov-Yamsky District

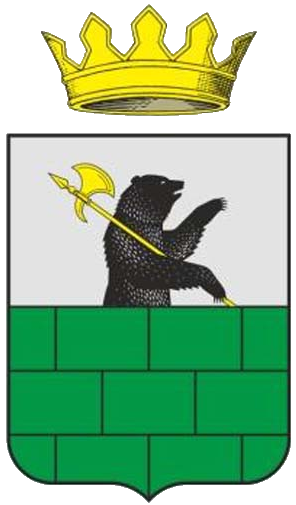
Lyubimsky District

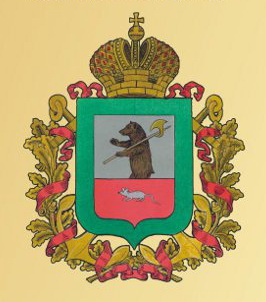
Myshkinsky District

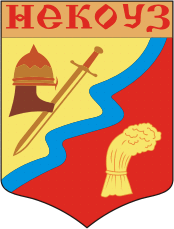
Nekouzsky District

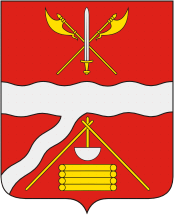
Nekrasovsky District

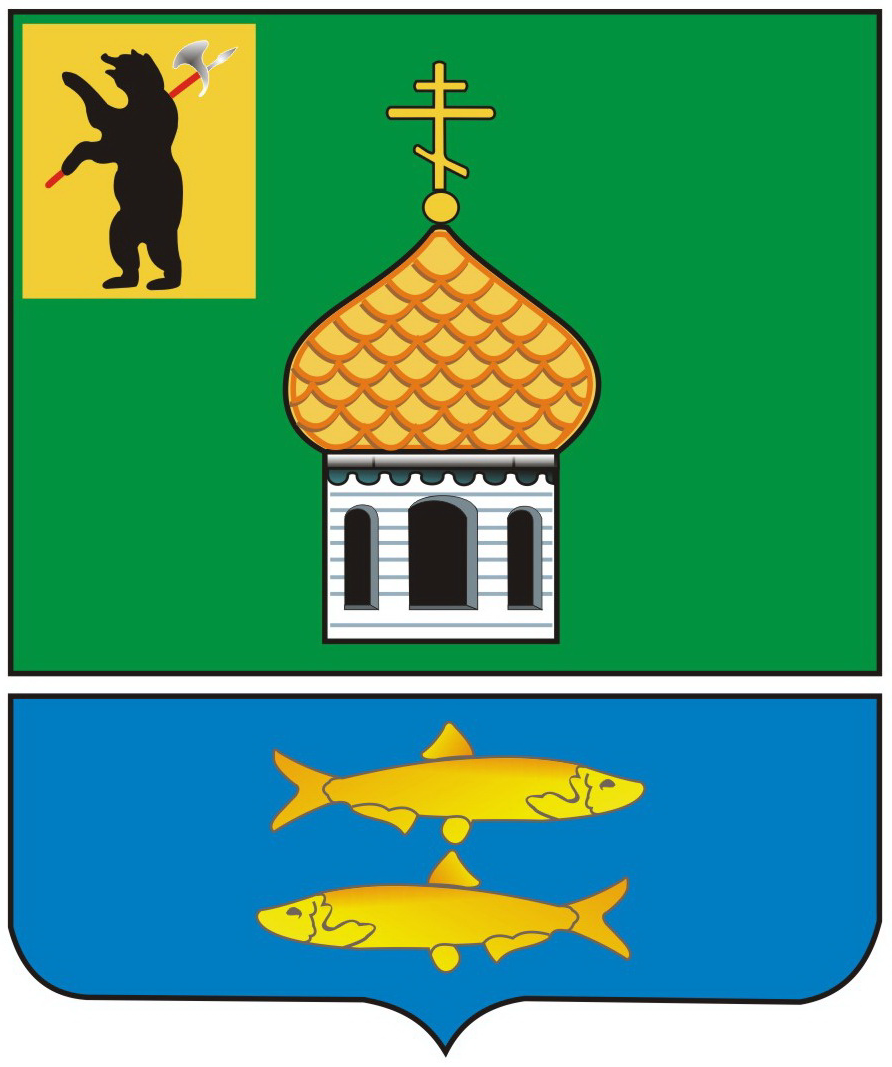
Pereslavsky District

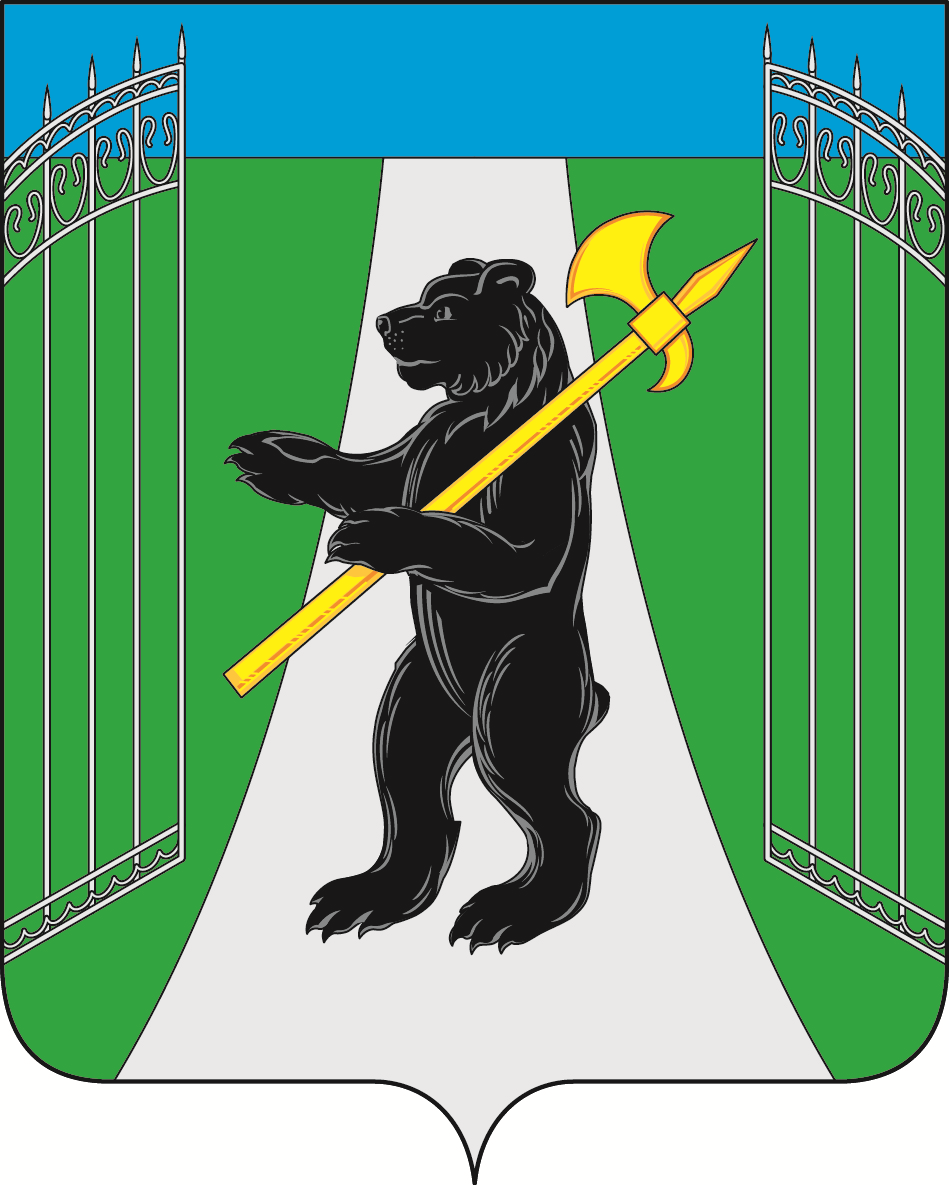
Pervomaysky District

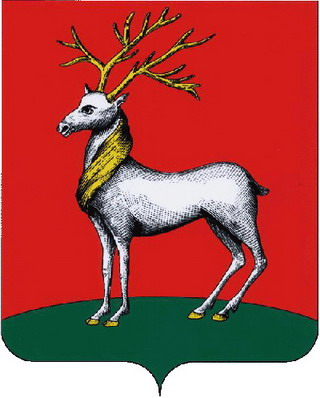
Rostovsky District

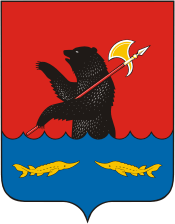
Rybinsky District

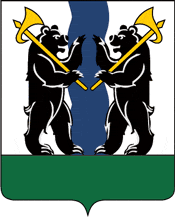
Yaroslavsky District

== Altai Krai ==
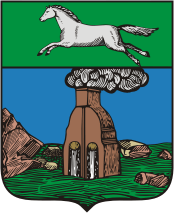
Barnaul

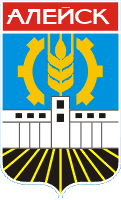
Aleysk

Belokurikha

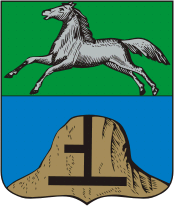
Biysk

Gornyak

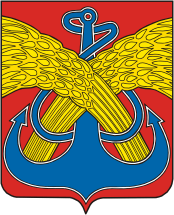
Kamen-na-Obi

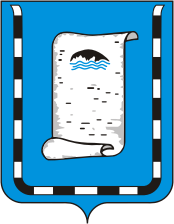
Novoaltaysk

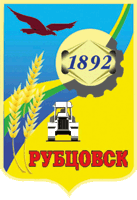
Rubtsovsk

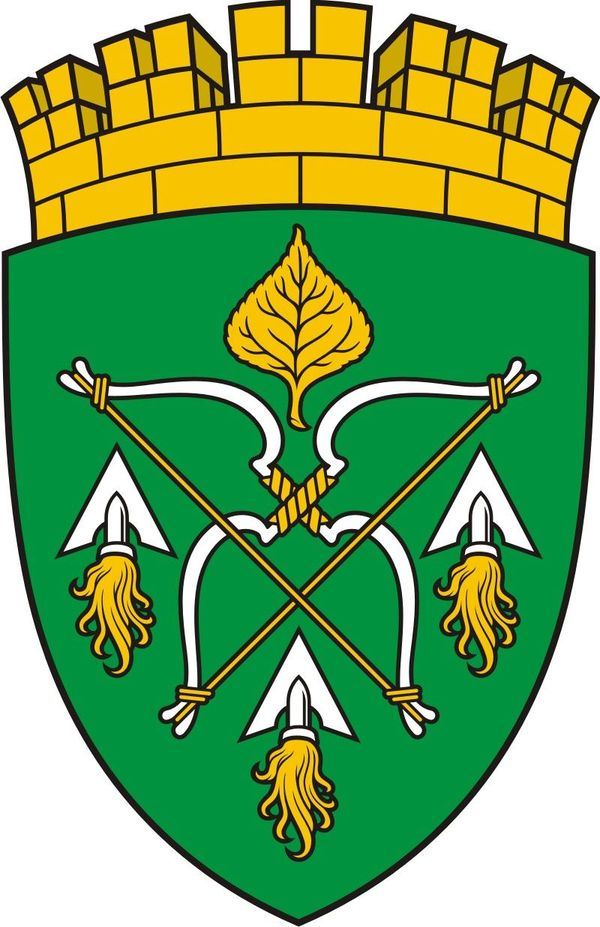
Sibirsky

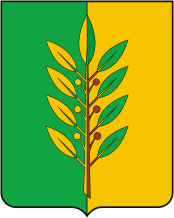
Slavgorod

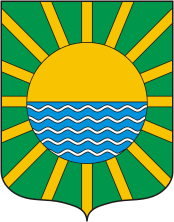
Yarovoye

Zarinsk

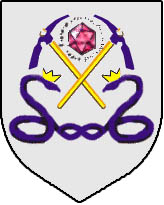
Zmeinogorsk

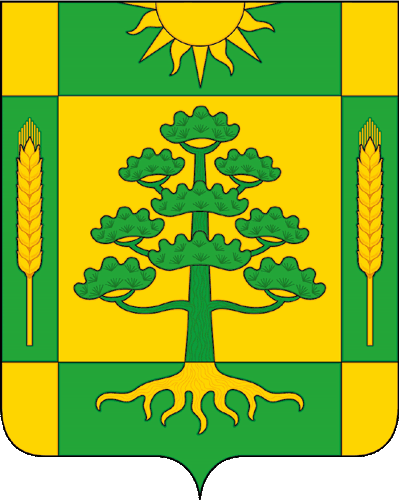
Novichikhinsky District

Pervomaysky District

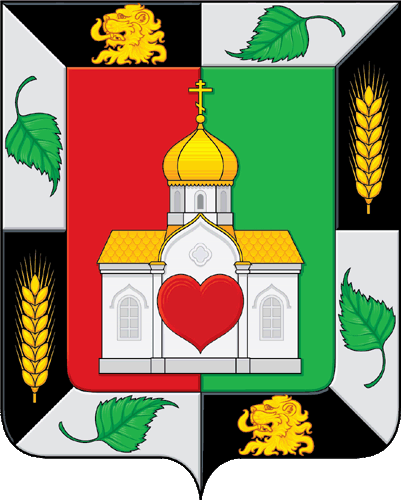
Romanovsky District

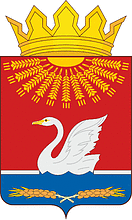
Sovetsky District

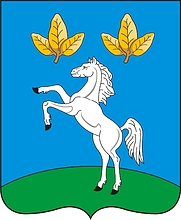
Tyumentsevsky District

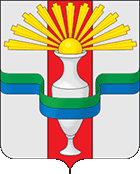
Yeltsovsky District

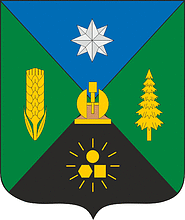
Zmeinogorsky District

== Kamchatka Krai ==
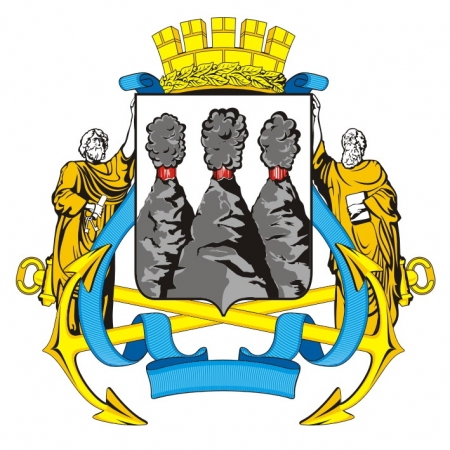
Petropavlovsk-Kamchatsky

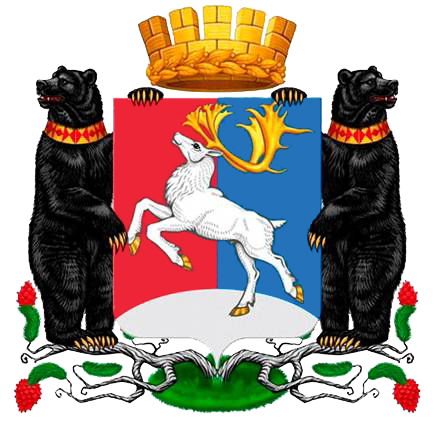
Palana

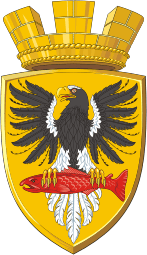
Yelizovo

Vilyuchinsk

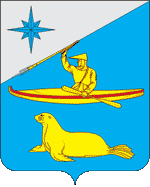
Aleutsky District

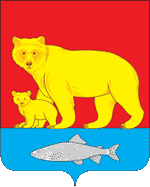
Karaginsky District

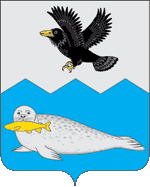
Olyutorsky District

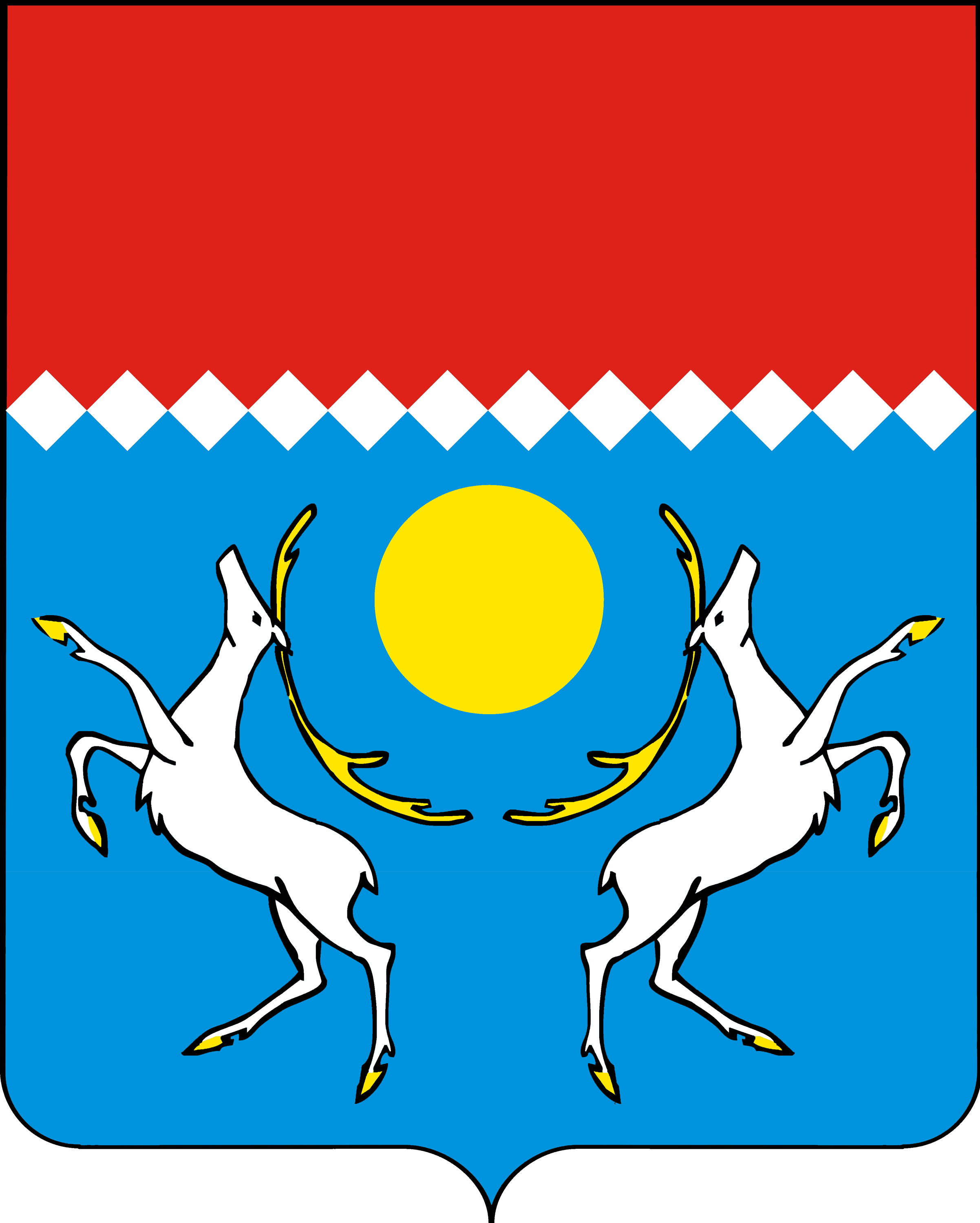
Penzhinsky District

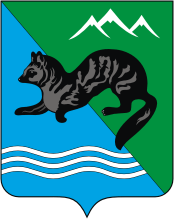
Sobolevsky District

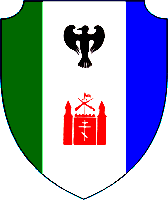
Tigilsky District

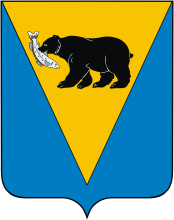
Ust-Bolsheretsky District

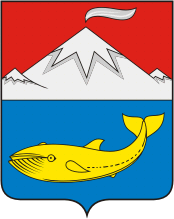
Ust-Kamchatsky District

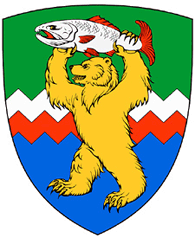
Yelizovsky District

== Khabarovsk Krai ==
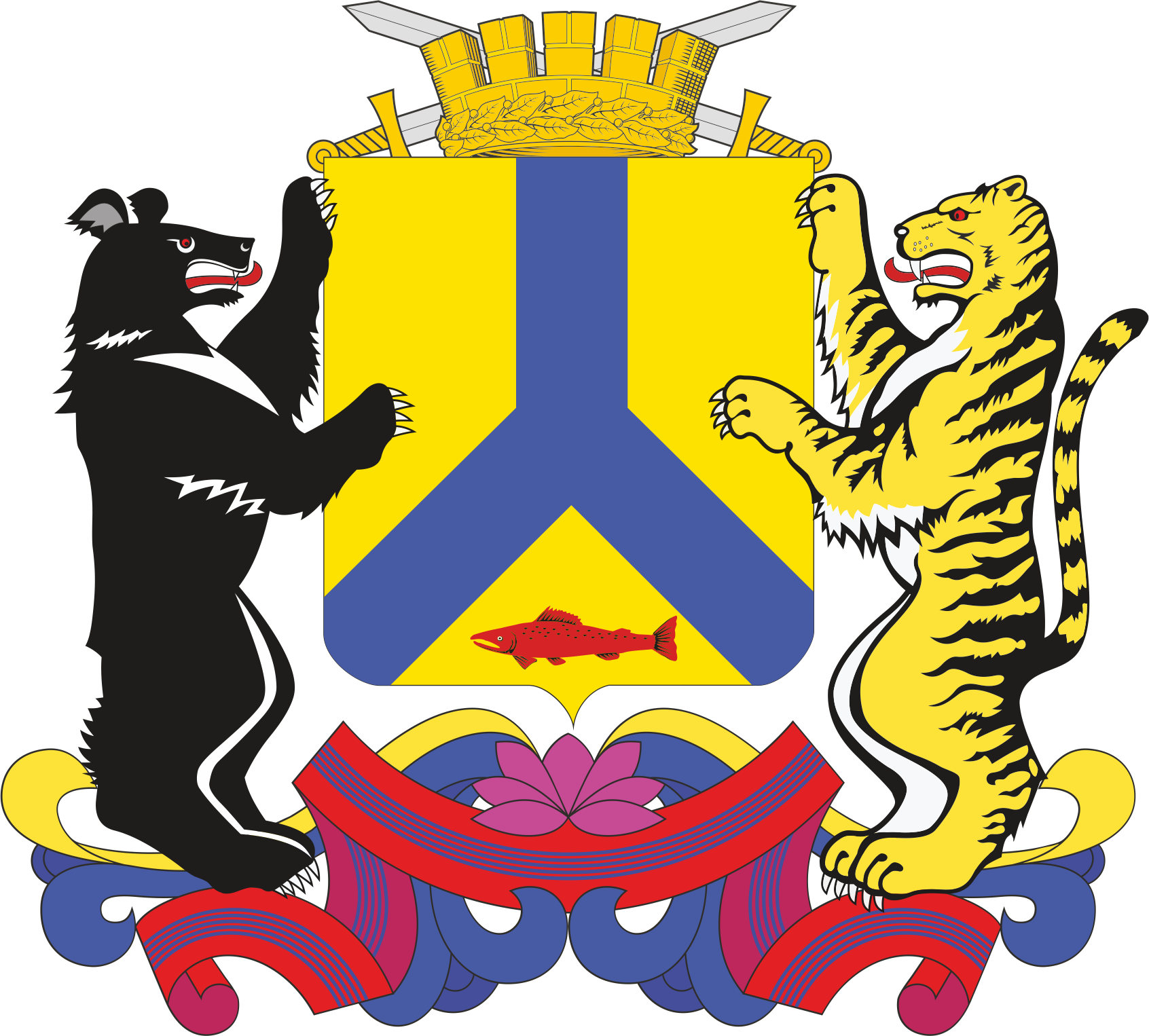
Khabarovsk

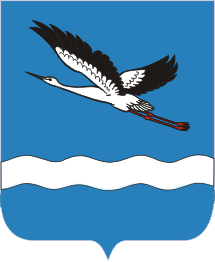
Amursk

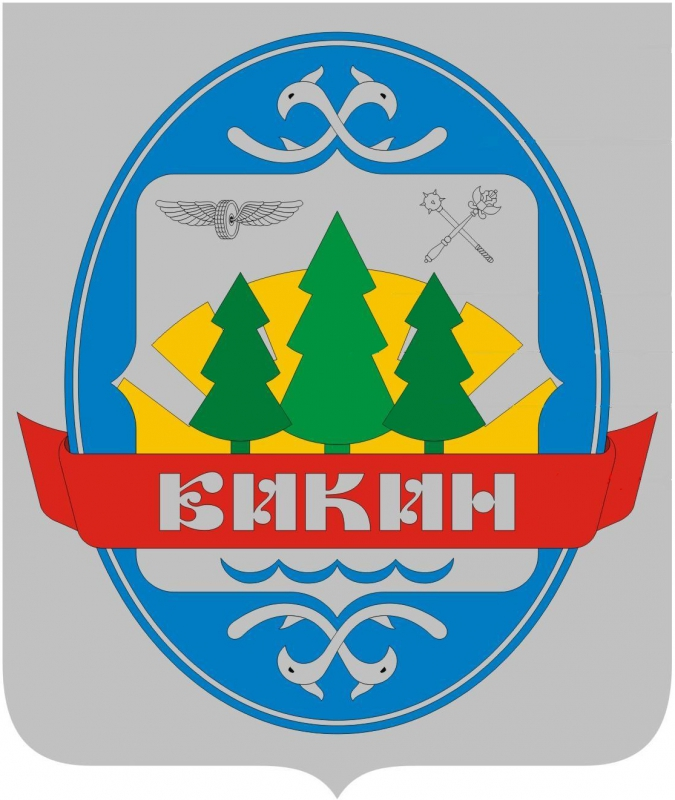
Bikin

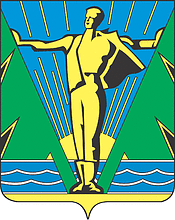
Komsomolsk-on-Amur

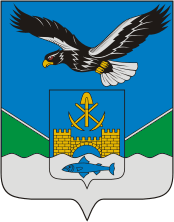
Nikolayevsk-on-Amur

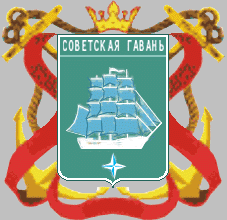
Sovetskaya Gavan

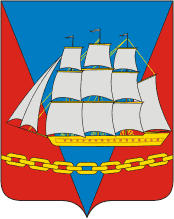
Vanino

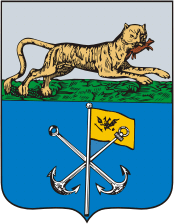
Okhotsk

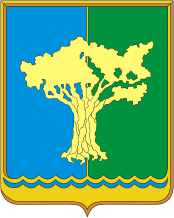
Amursky District

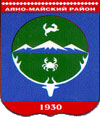
Ayano-Maysky District

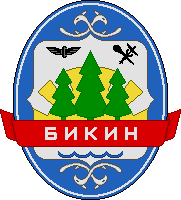
Bikinsky District

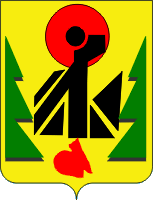
Verkhnebureinsky District

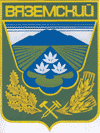
Vyazemsky District

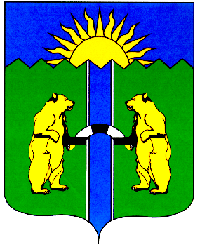
Komsomolsky District

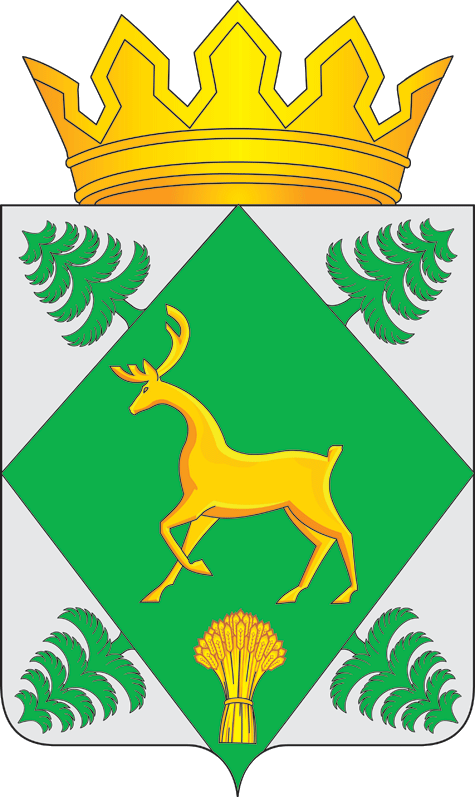
Imeni Lazo District

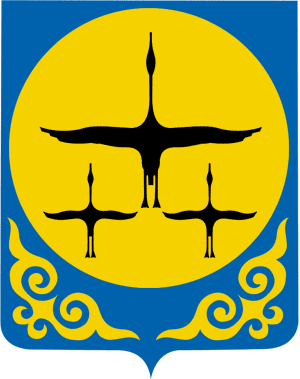
Nanaysky District

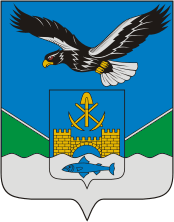
Nikolayevsky District

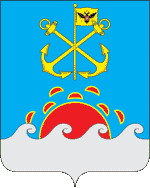
Okhotsky District

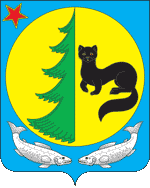
Imeni Poliny Osipenko District

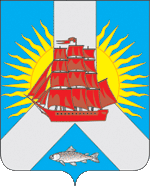
Sovetsko-Gavansky District

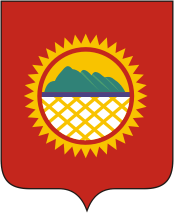
Solnechny District

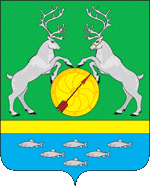
Tuguro-Chumikansky District

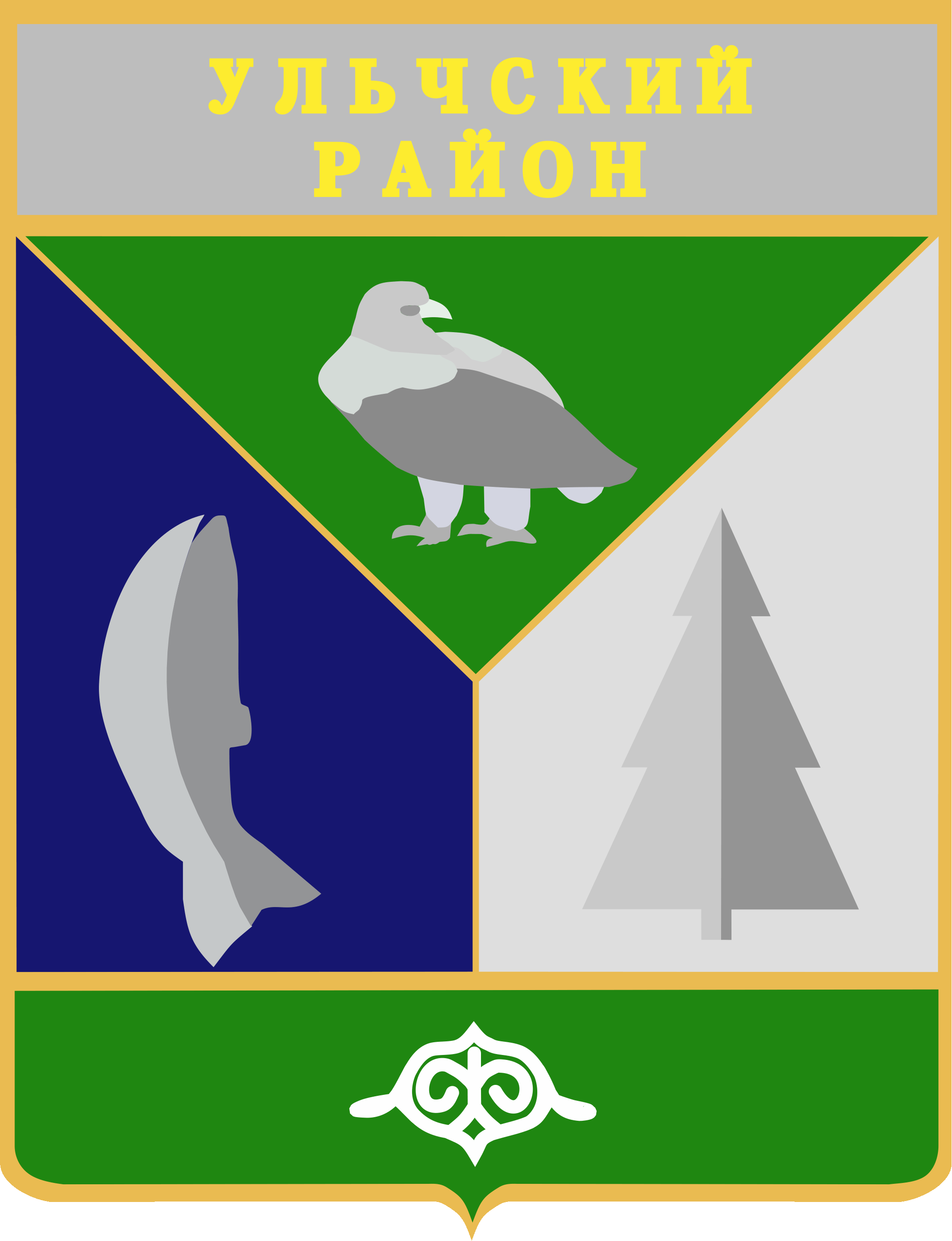
Ulchsky District

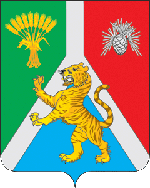
Khabarovsky District

== Krasnodar Krai ==
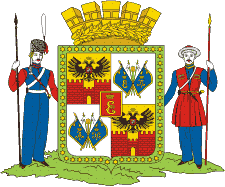
Krasnodar

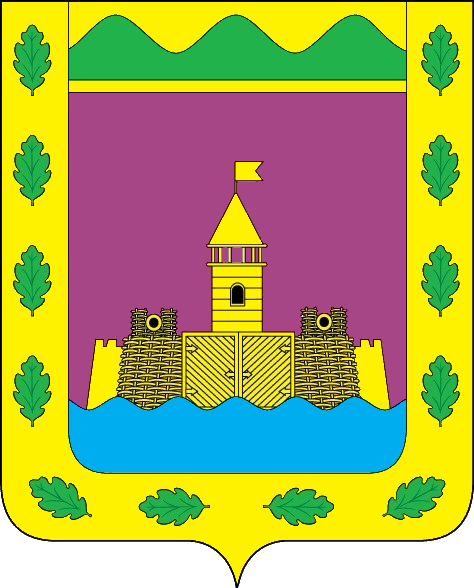
Abinsk

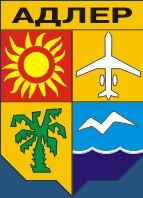
Adlersky City District

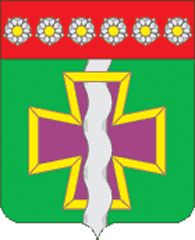
Afipsky

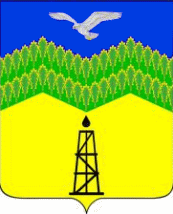
Akhtyrsky

Anapa

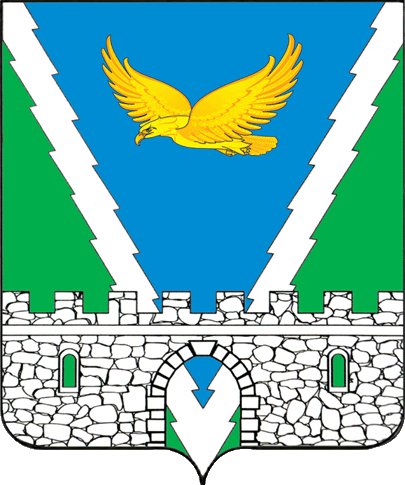
Apsheronsk

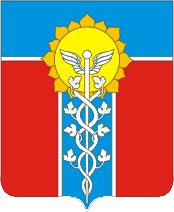
Armavir

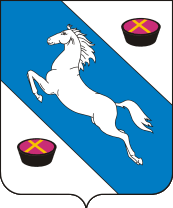
Belorechensk

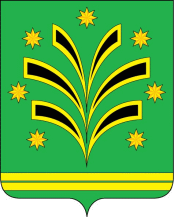
Chernomorsky

Gelendzhik

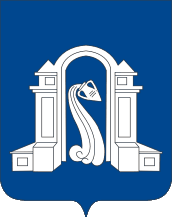
Goryachy Klyuch

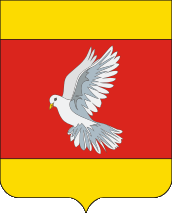
Gulkevichi

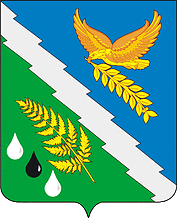
Khadyzhensk

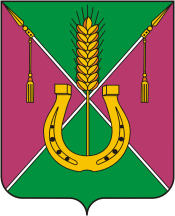
Korenovsk

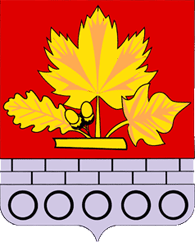
Krasnoselsky

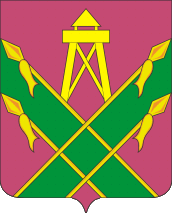
Kropotkin

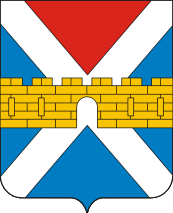
Krymsk

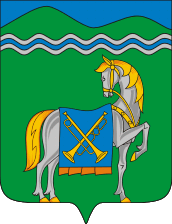
Kurganinsk

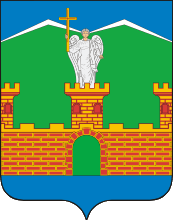
Labinsk

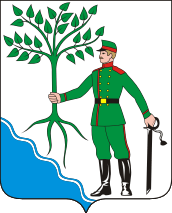
Novokubansk

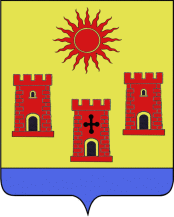
Novomikhaylovsky

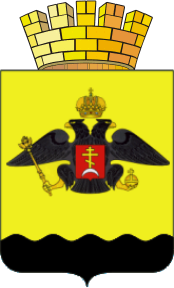
Novorossiysk

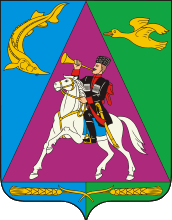
Primorsko-Akhtarsk

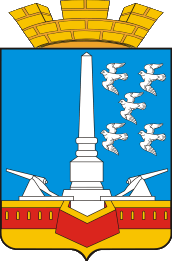
Slavyansk-na-Kubani

Sochi

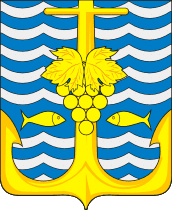
Temryuk

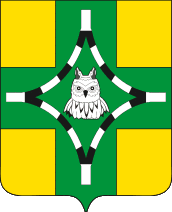
Tikhoretsk

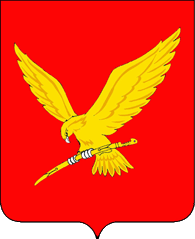
Timashyovsk

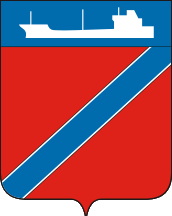
Tuapse

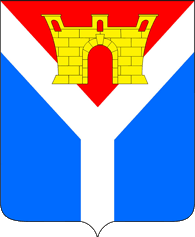
Ust-Labinsk

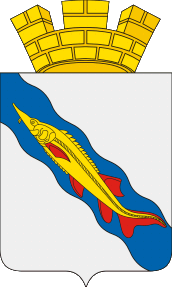
Yeysk

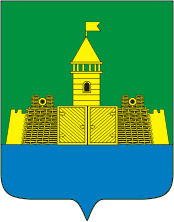
Abinsky District

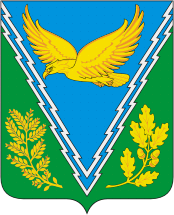
Apsheronsky District

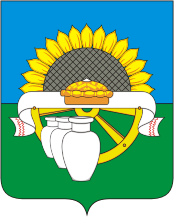
Beloglinsky District

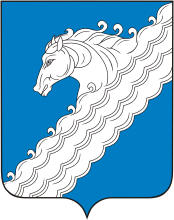
Belorechensky District

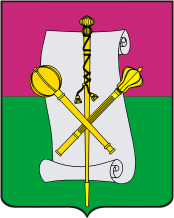
Bryukhovetsky District

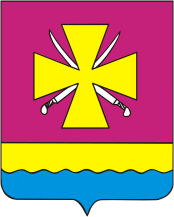
Dinskoy District

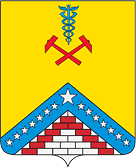
Gulkevichsky District

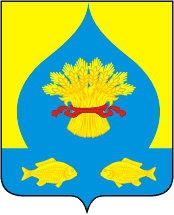
Kalininsky District

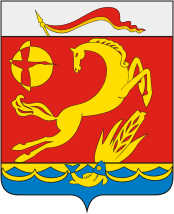
Kanevskoy District

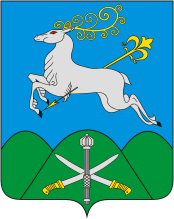
Kavkazsky District

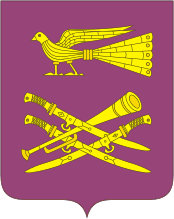
Korenovsky District

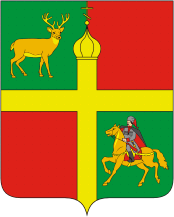
Krasnoarmeysky District

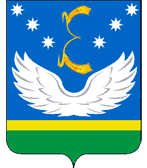
Krylovsky District

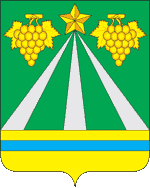
Krymsky District

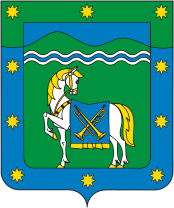
Kurganinsky District

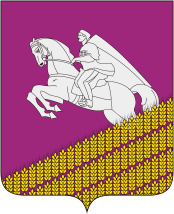
Kushchyovsky District

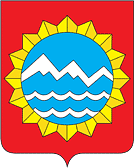
Labinsky District

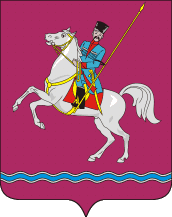
Leningradsky District

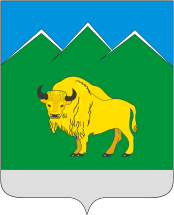
Mostovsky District

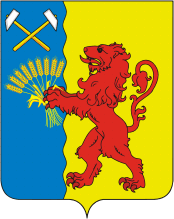
Novokubansky District

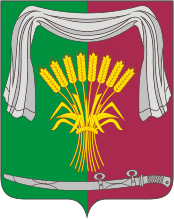
Novopokrovsky District

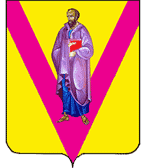
Pavlovsky District

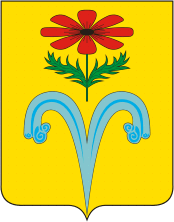
Otradnensky District

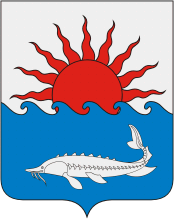
Primorsko-Akhtarsky District

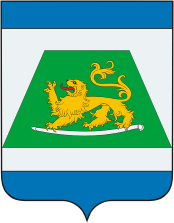
Seversky District

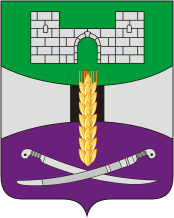
Shcherbinovsky District

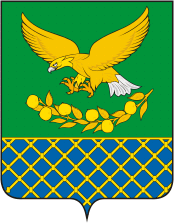
Slavyansky District

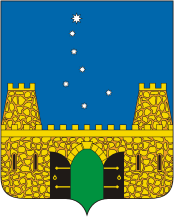
Starominsky District

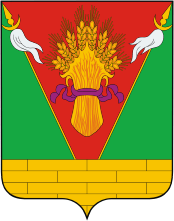
Tbilissky District

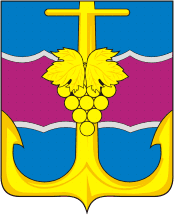
Temryuksky District

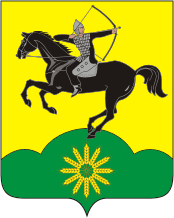
Tikhoretsky District

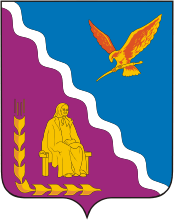
Timashyovsky District

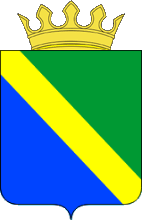
Tuapsinsky District

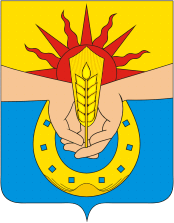
Uspensky District

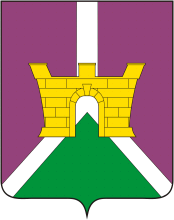
Ust-Labinsky District

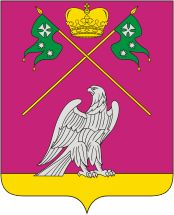
Vyselkovsky District

Yeysky District

== Krasnoyarsk Krai ==
Krasnoyarsk

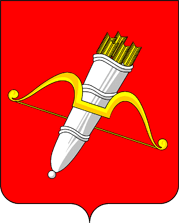
Achinsk

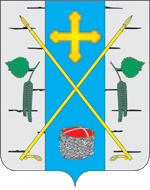
Beryozovka

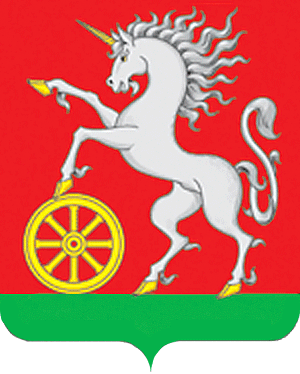
Bogotol

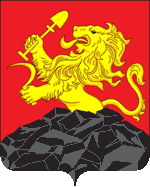
Borodino

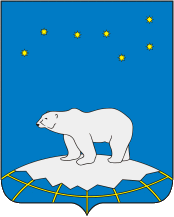
Dikson

Divnogorsk

Dudinka

Igarka

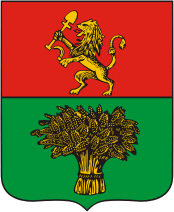
Kansk

Kedrovy

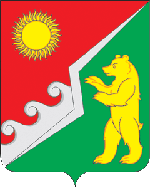
Kodinsk

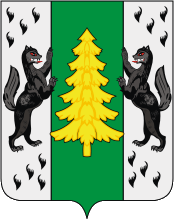
Lesosibirsk

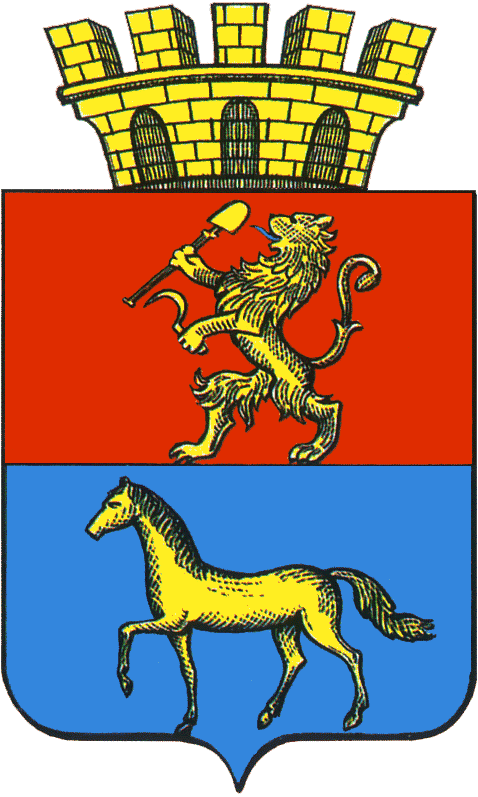
Minusinsk

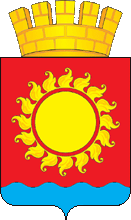
Nazarovo

Norilsk

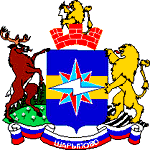
Sharypovo

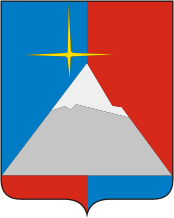
Snezhnogorsk

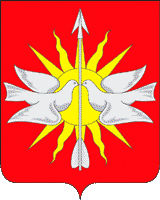
Solnechny

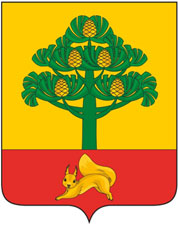
Sosnovoborsk

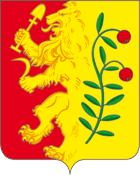
Uyar

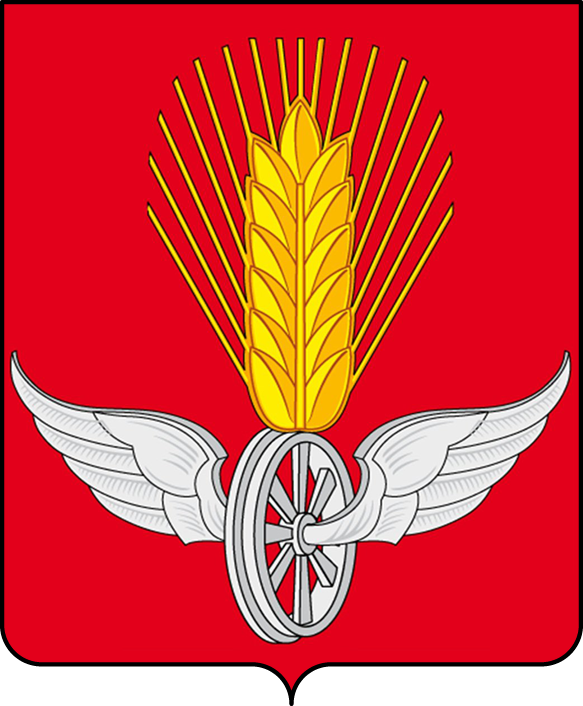
Uzhur

Yeniseysk

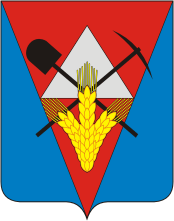
Zaozyorny

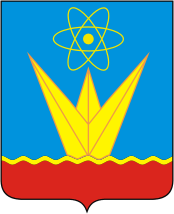
Zelenogorsk

Zheleznogorsk

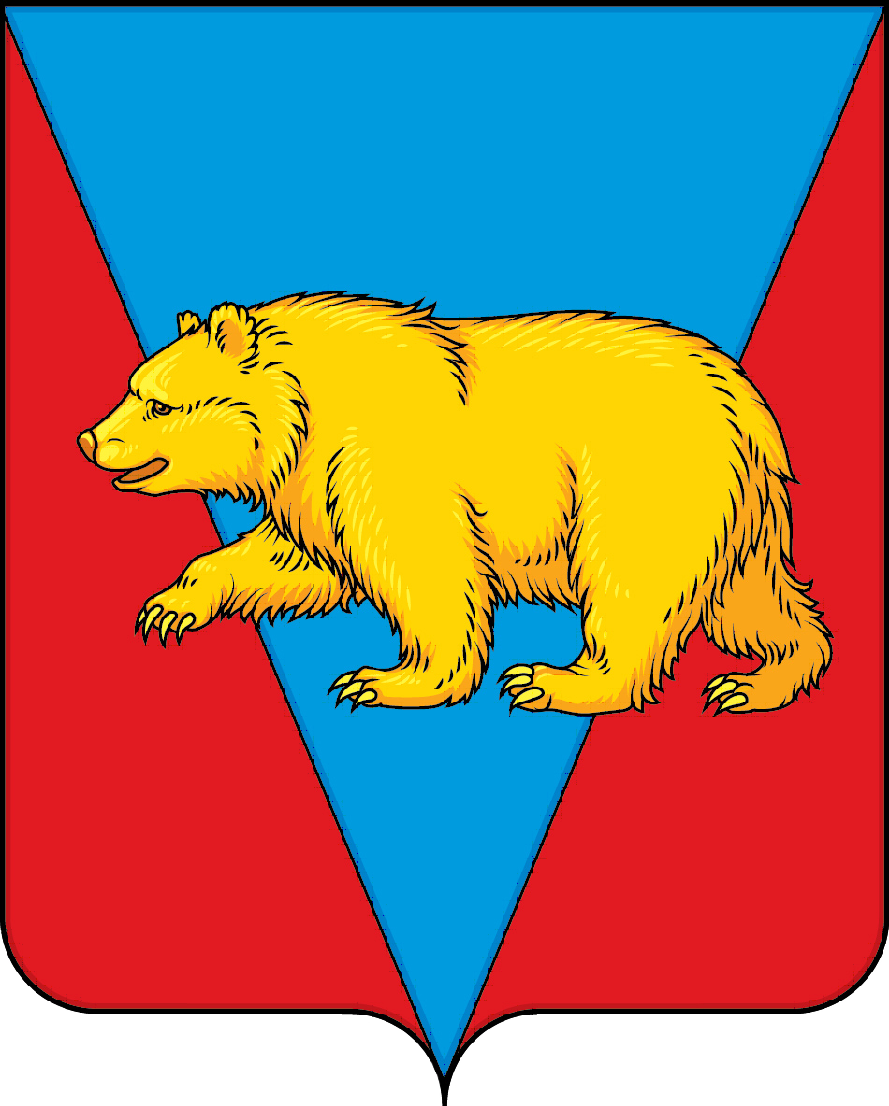
Abansky District

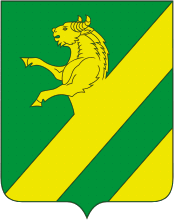
Achinsky District

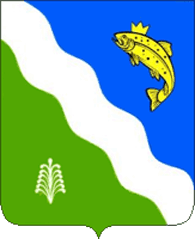
Balakhtinsky District

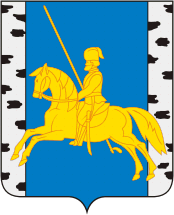
Beryozovsky District

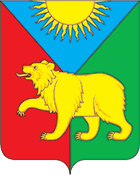
Birilyussky District

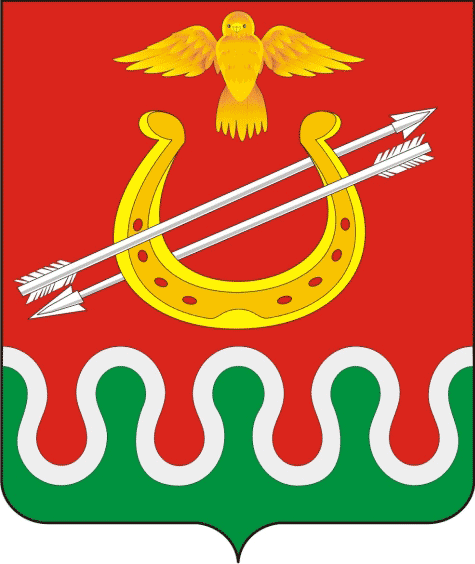
Bogotolsky District

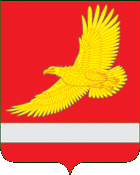
Bolshemurtinsky District

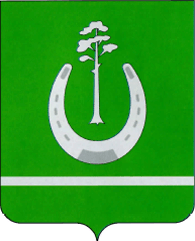
Bolsheuluysky District

Dzerzhinsky District

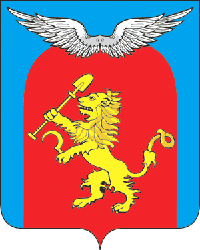
Yemelyanovsky District

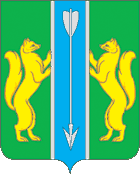
Yeniseysky District

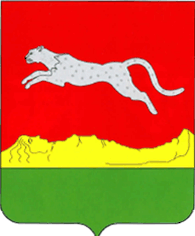
Yermakovsky District

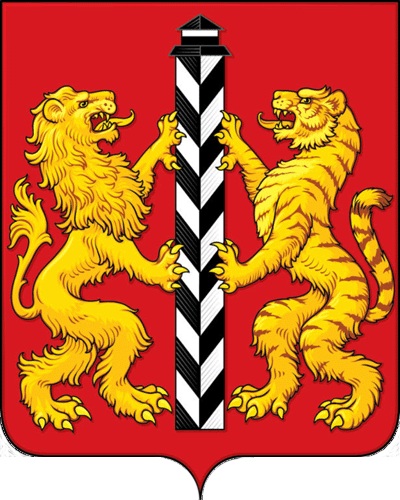
Ilansky District

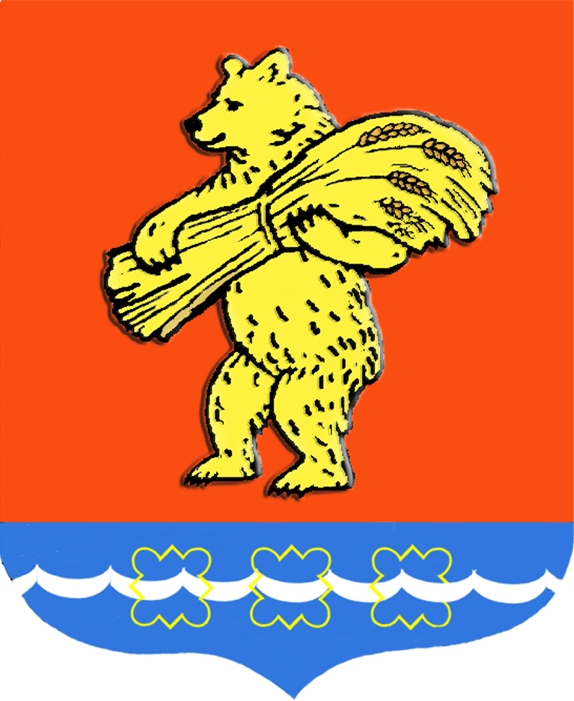
Kazachinsky District

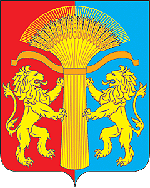
Kansky District

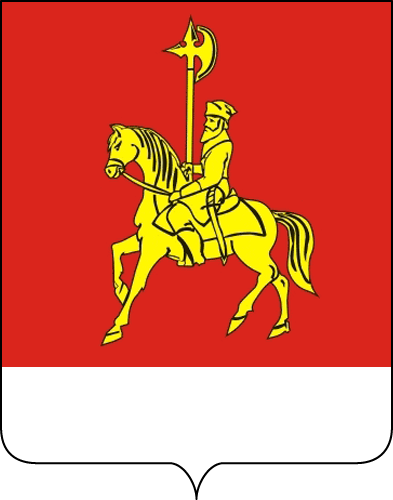
Karatuzsky District

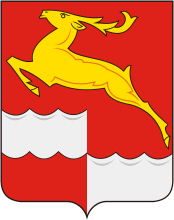
Kezhemsky District

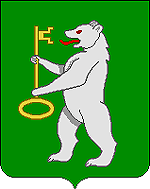
Kozulsky District

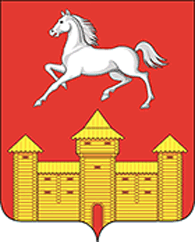
Krasnoturansky District

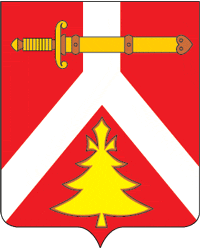
Kuraginsky District

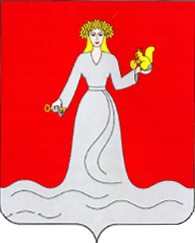
Mansky District

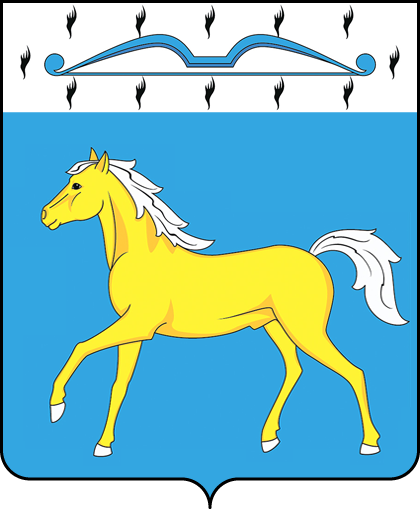
Minusinsky District

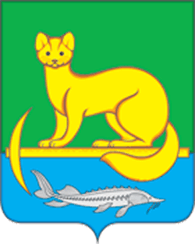
Motyginsky District

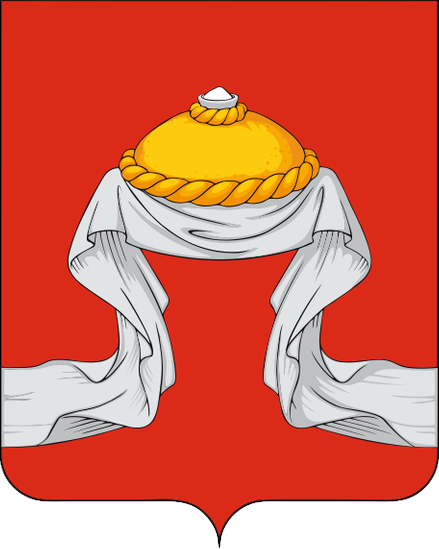
Nazarovsky District

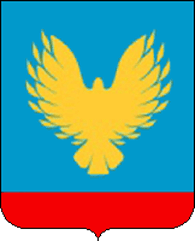
Nizhneingashsky District

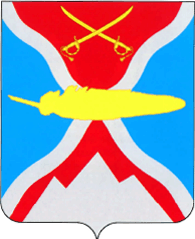
Partizansky District

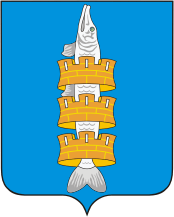
Rybinsky District

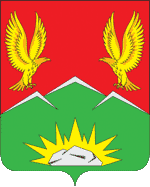
Sayansky District

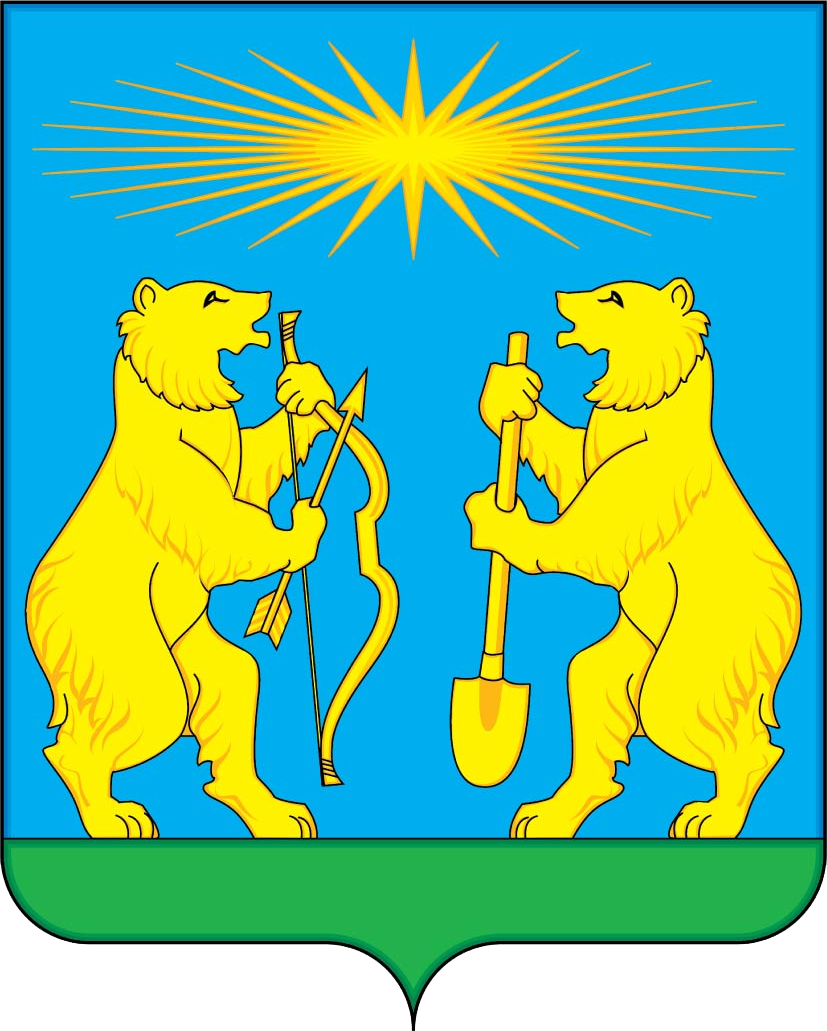
Severo-Yeniseysky District

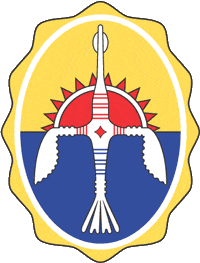
Evenkiysky District

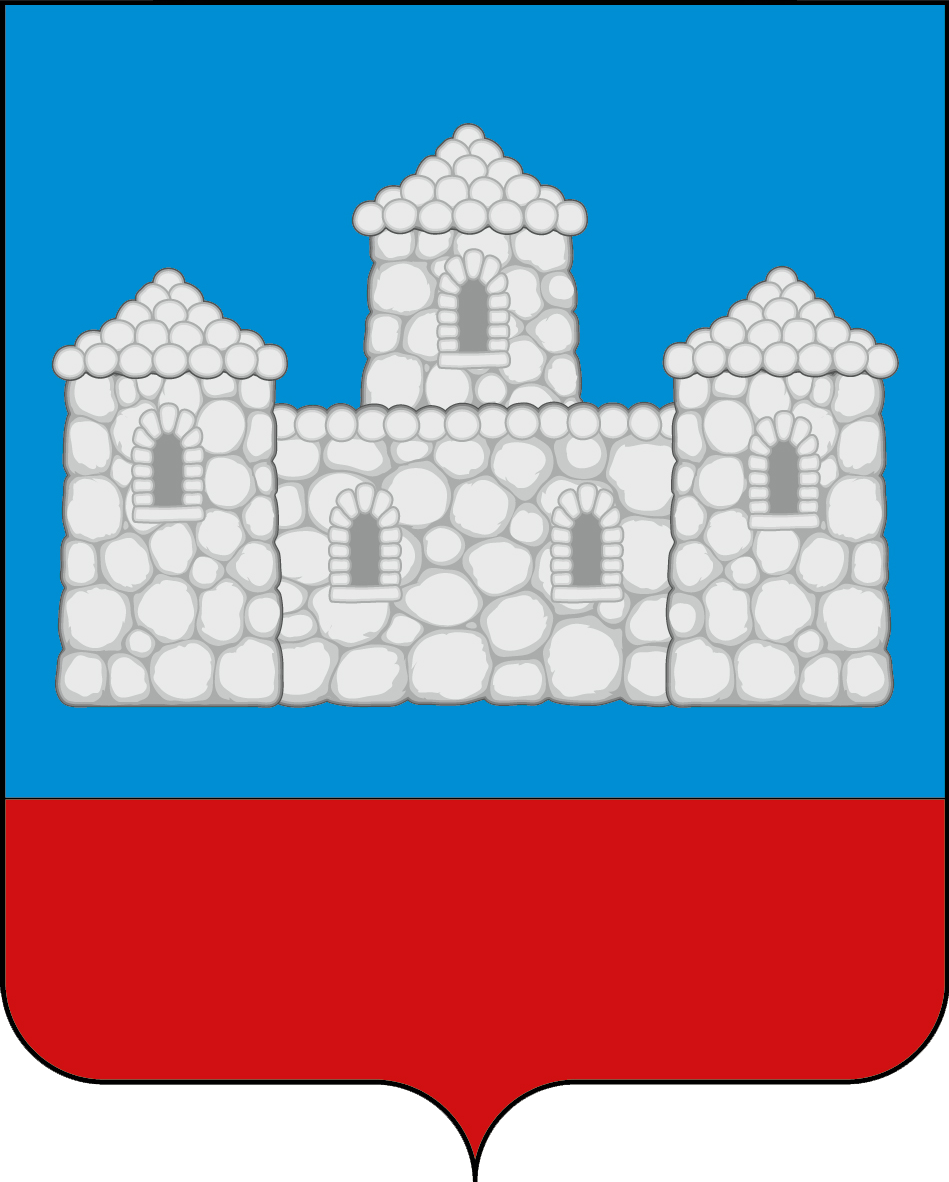
Sukhobuzimsky District

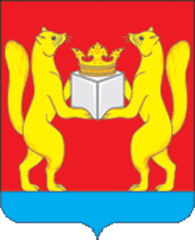
Taseyevsky District

Taymyrsky Dolgano-Nenetsky District

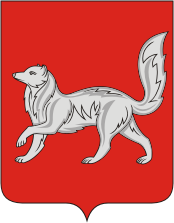
Turukhansky District

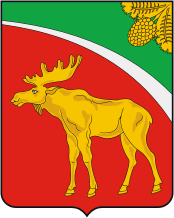
Tyukhtetsky District

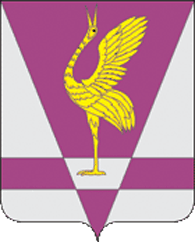
Uzhursky District

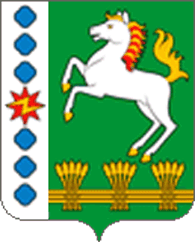
Sharypovsky District

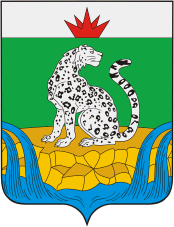
Shushensky District

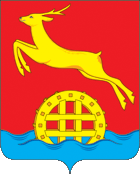
Idrinsky District

== Perm Krai ==
Perm

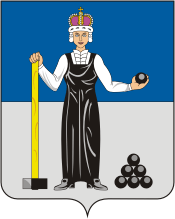
Alexandrovsk

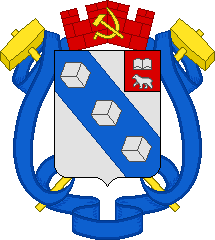
Berezniki

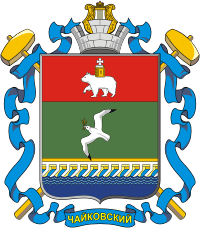
Chaykovsky

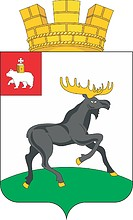
Cherdyn

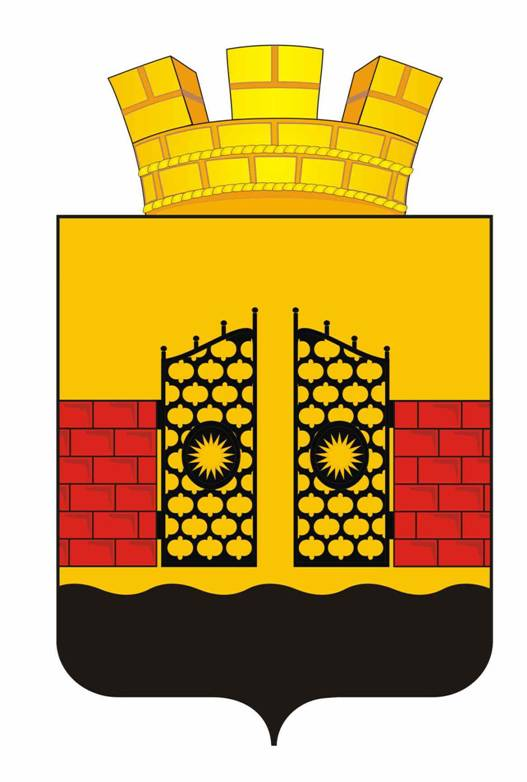
Chernushka

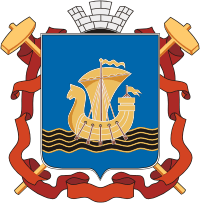
Chusovoy

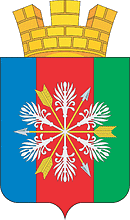
Chyormoz

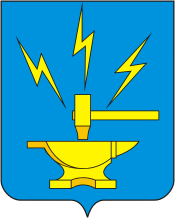
Dobryanka

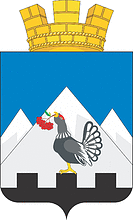
Gremyachinsk

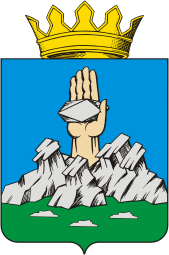
Gornozavodsk

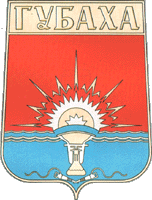
Gubakha

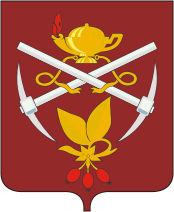
Kizel

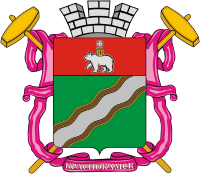
Krasnokamsk

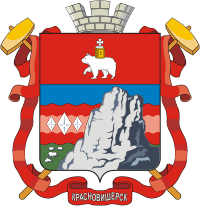
Krasnovishersk

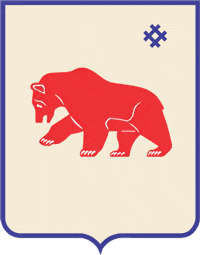
Kudymkar

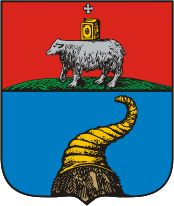
Kungur

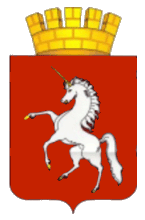
Lysva

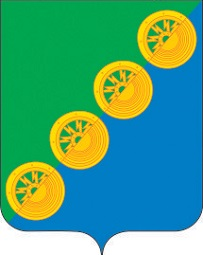
Novoilyinsky

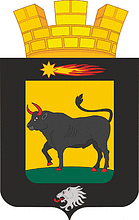
Nyrob

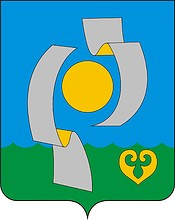
Nytva

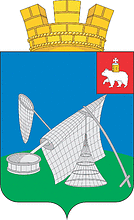
Okhansk

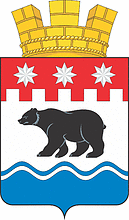
Ochyor

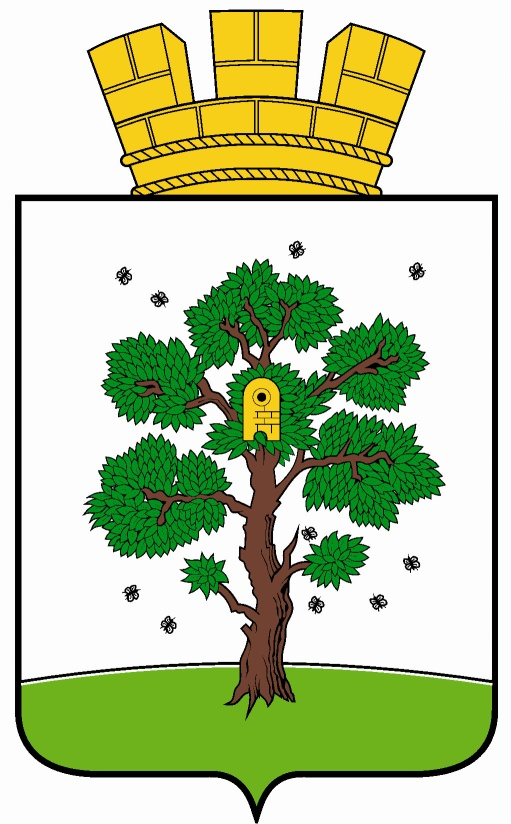
Osa

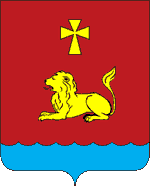
Polazna

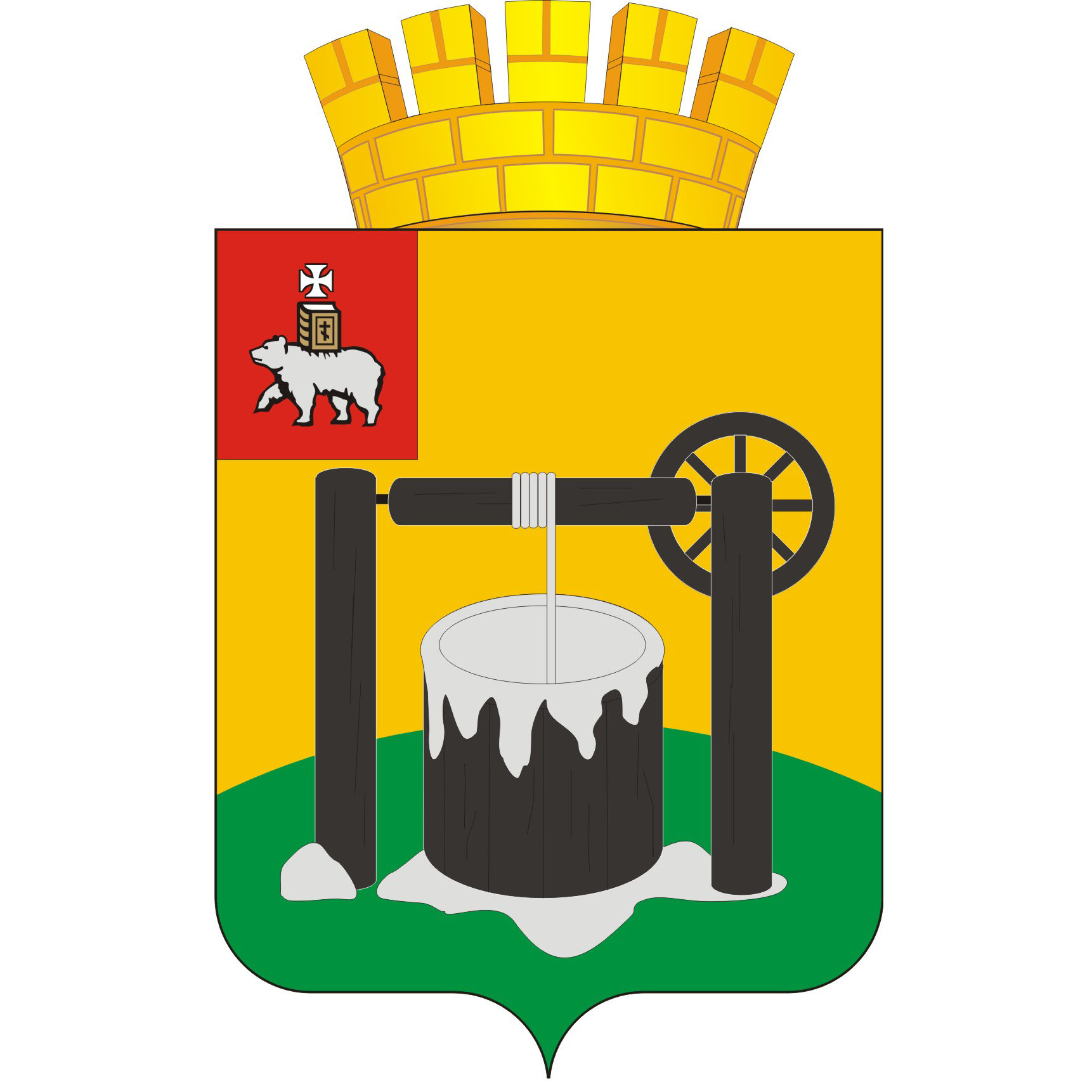
Solikamsk

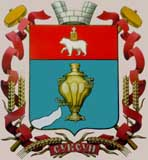
Suksun

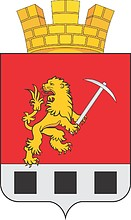
Ugleuralsky

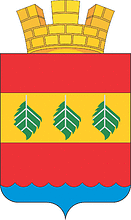
Uralsky

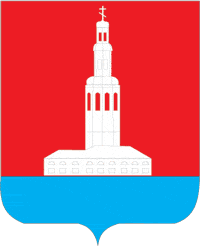
Usolye

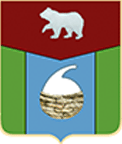
Vsevolodo-Vilva

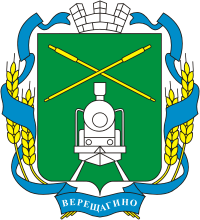
Vereshchagino

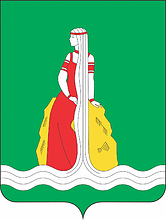
Yayva

Zvyozdny

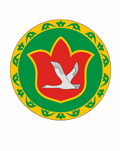
Bardymsky District

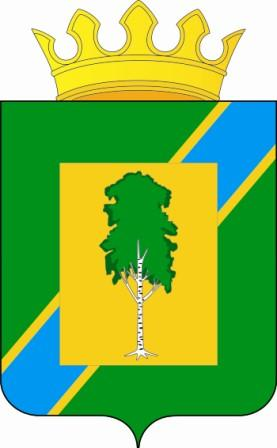
Beryozovsky District

Bolshesosnovsky District

Vereshchaginsky District

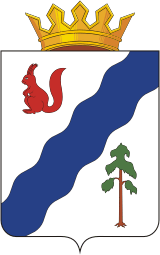
Gaynsky District

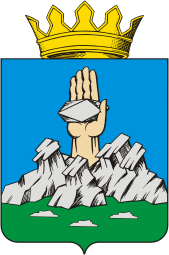
Gornozavodsky District

Kosinsky District

Yelovsky District

Kochyovsky District

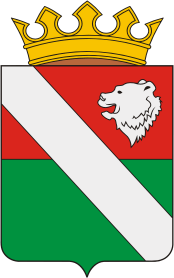
Ilyinsky District

Kudymkarsky District

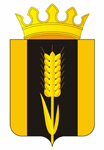
Karagaysky District

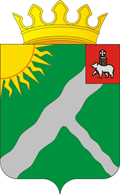
Kishertsky District

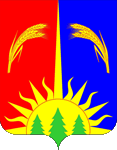
Yurlinsky District

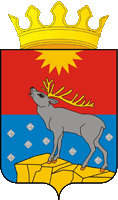
Krasnovishersky District

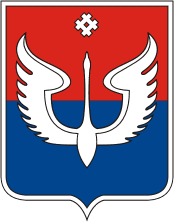
Yusvinsky District

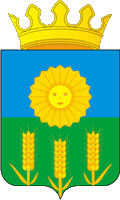
Kuyedinsky District

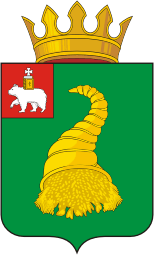
Kungursky District

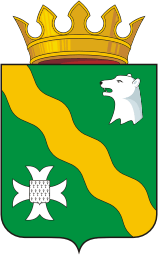
Nytvensky District

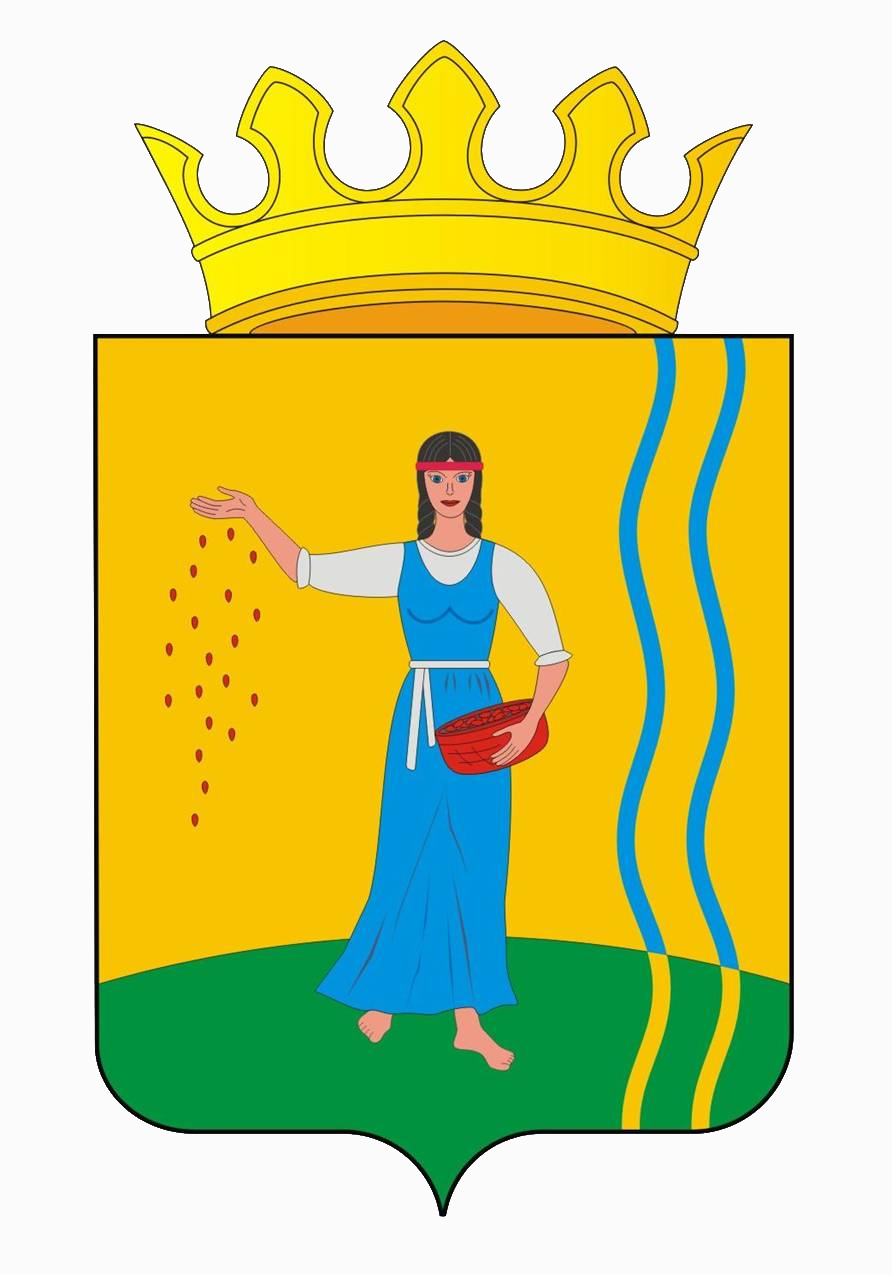
Oktyabrsky District

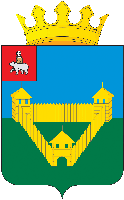
Ordinsky District

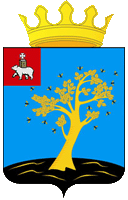
Osinsky District

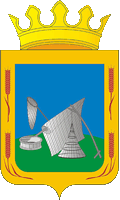
Okhansky District

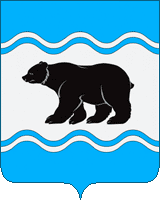
Ochyorsky District

Permsky District

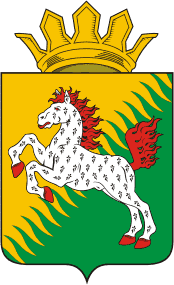
Sivinsky District

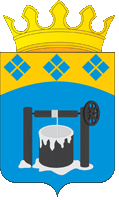
Solikamsky District

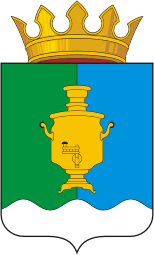
Suksunsky District

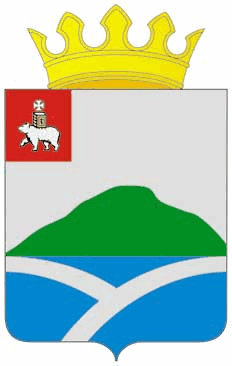
Uinsky District

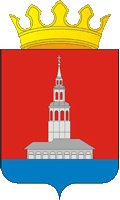
Usolsky District

Chastinsky District

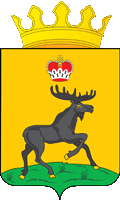
Cherdynsky District

Chernushinsky District

== Primorsky Krai ==
Vladivostok

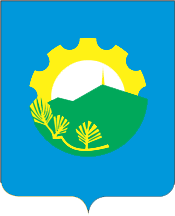
Arsenyev

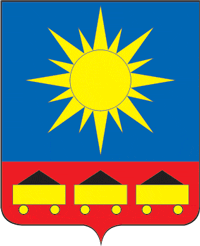
Artyom

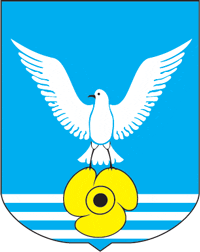
Bolshoy Kamen

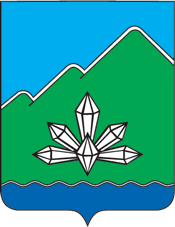
Dalnegorsk

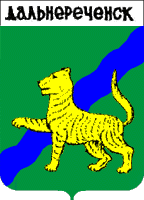
Dalnerechensk

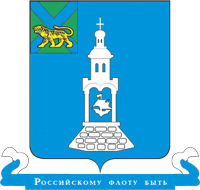
Fokino

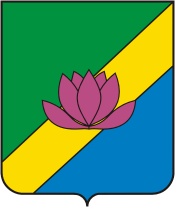
Lesozavodsk

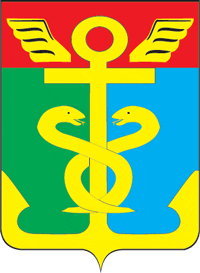
Nakhodka

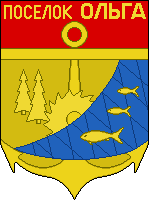
Olga

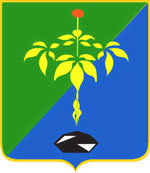
Partizansk

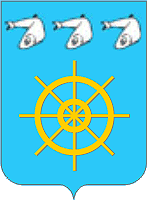
Preobrazheniye

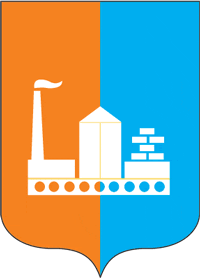
Spassk-Dalny

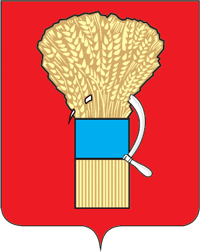
Ussuriysk

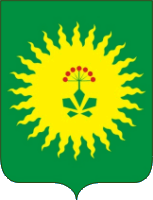
Anuchinsky District

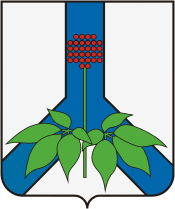
Dalnerechensky District

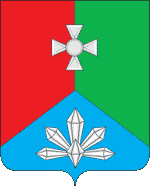
Kavalerovsky District

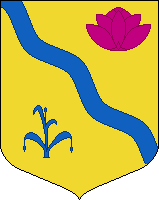
Kirovsky District

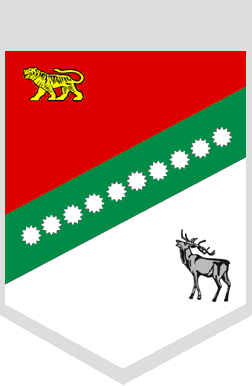
Krasnoarmeysky District

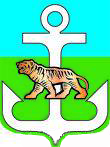
Lazovsky District

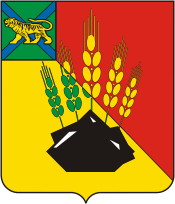
Mikhaylovsky District

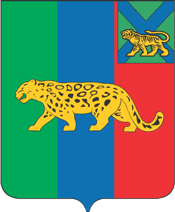
Nadezhdinsky District

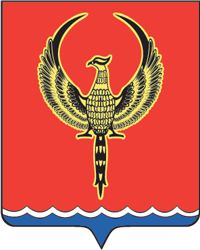
Oktyabrsky District

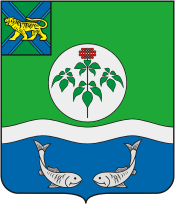
Olginsky District

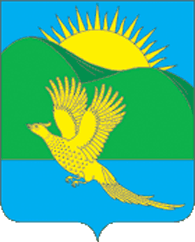
Partizansky District

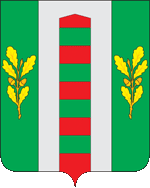
Pogranichny District

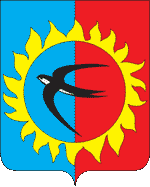
Pozharsky District

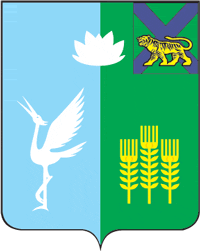
Spassky District

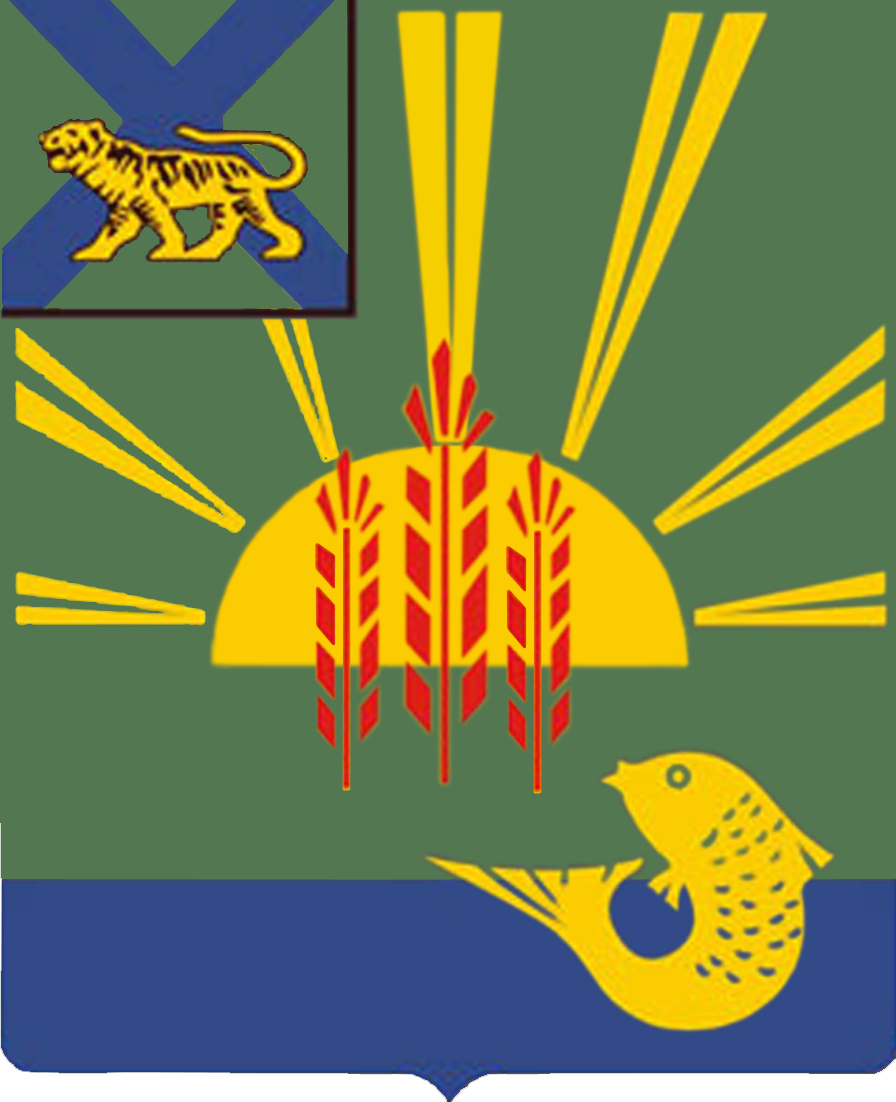
Khankaysky District

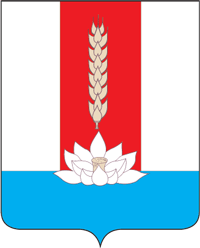
Chernigovsky District

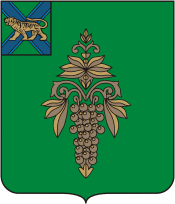
Chuguyevsky District

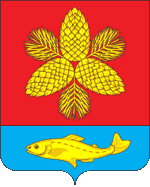
Shkotovsky District

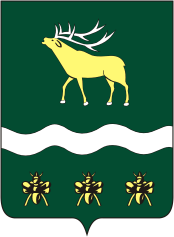
Yakovlevsky District

== Stavropol Krai ==
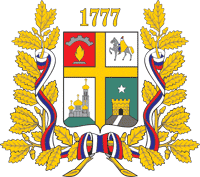
Stavropol

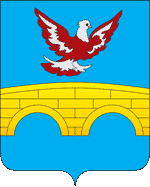
Blagodarny

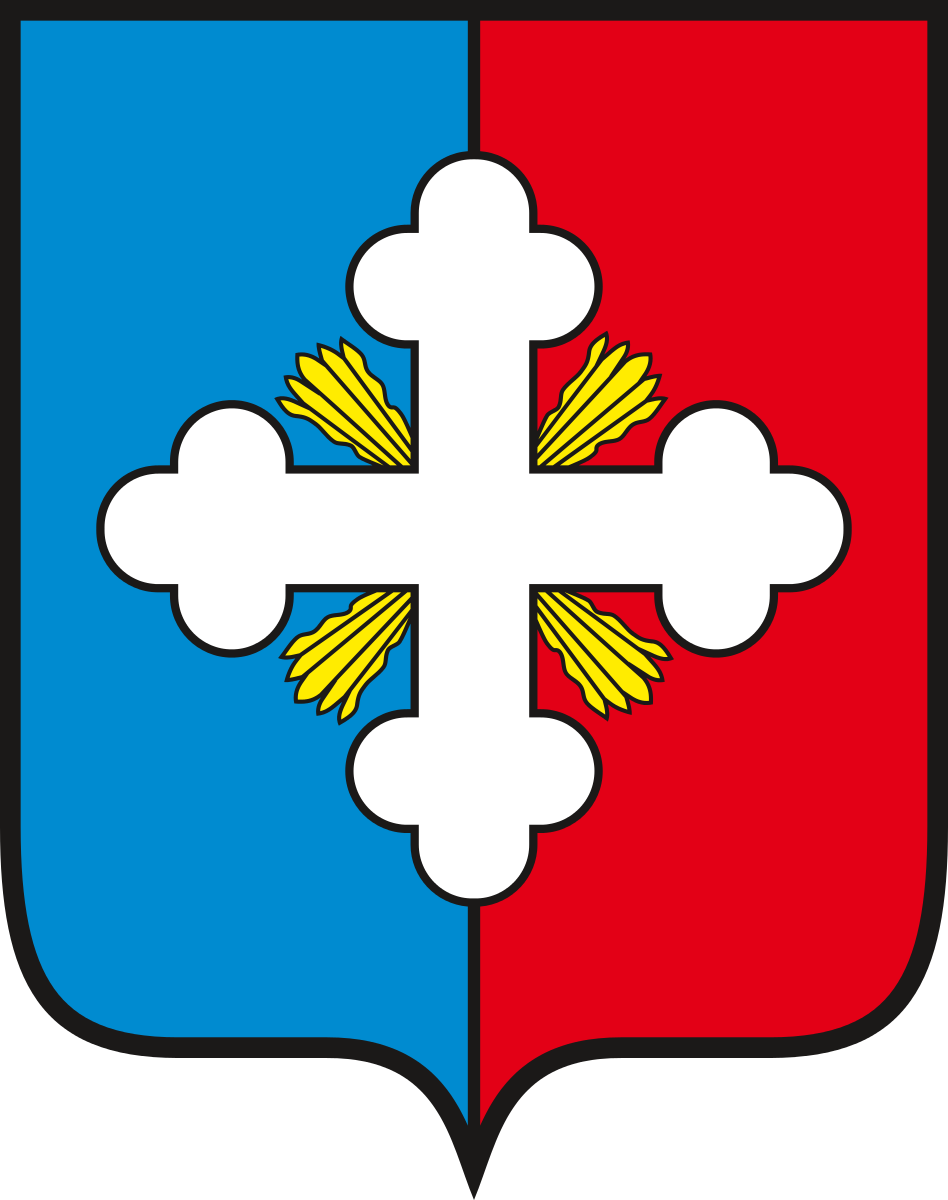
Budyonnovsk

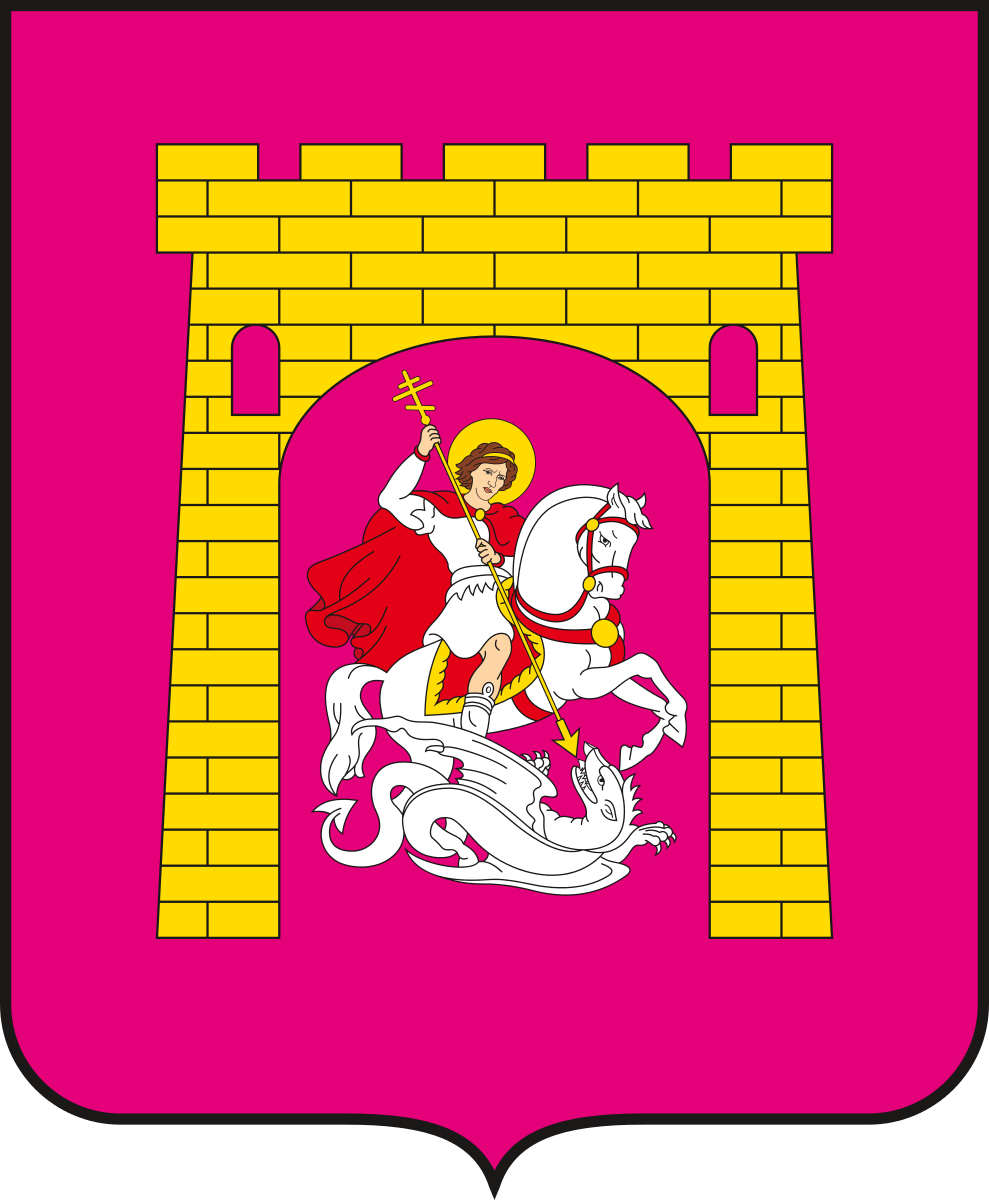
Georgiyevsk

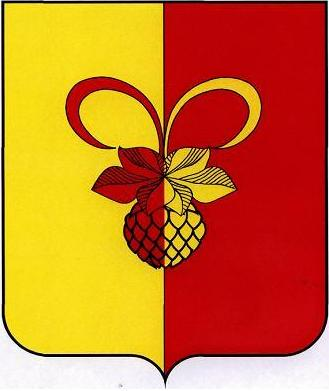
Ipatovo

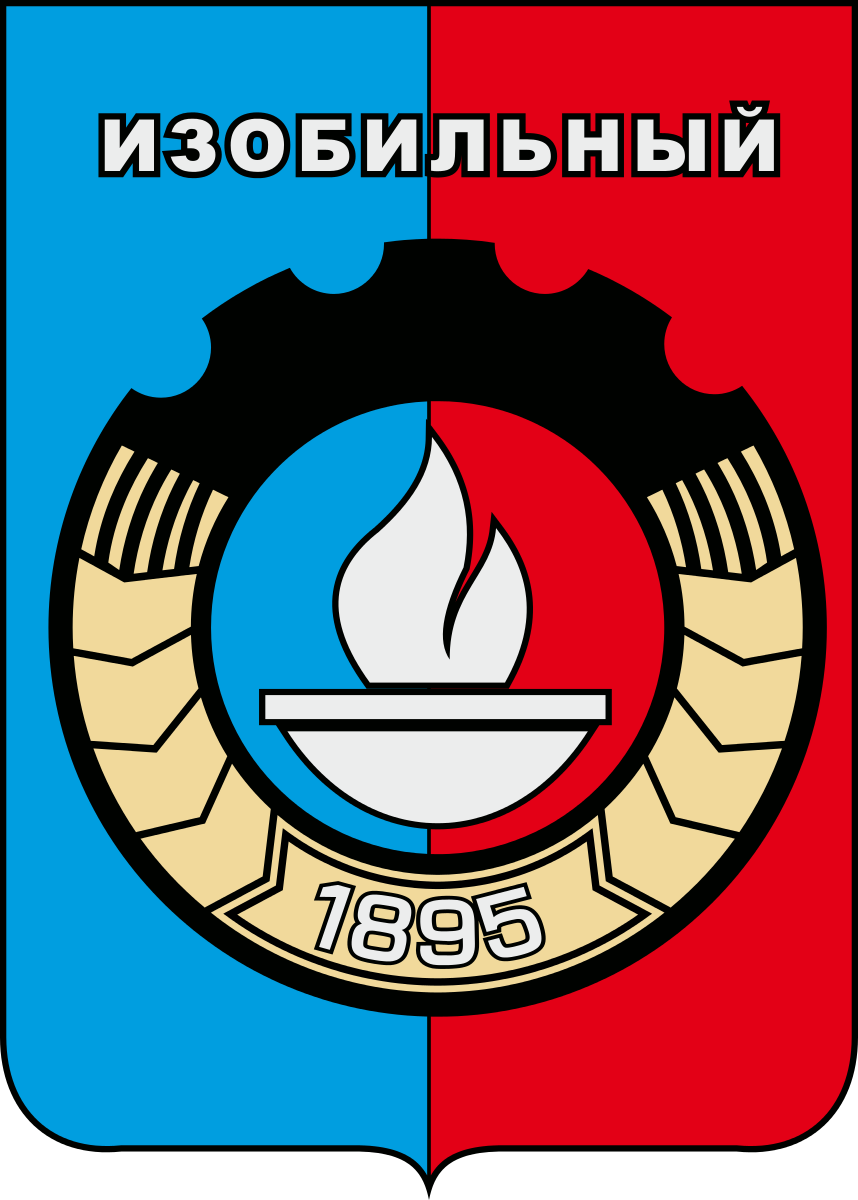
Izobilny

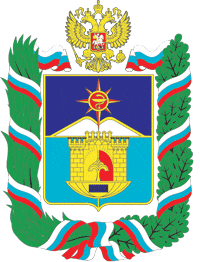
Kislovodsk

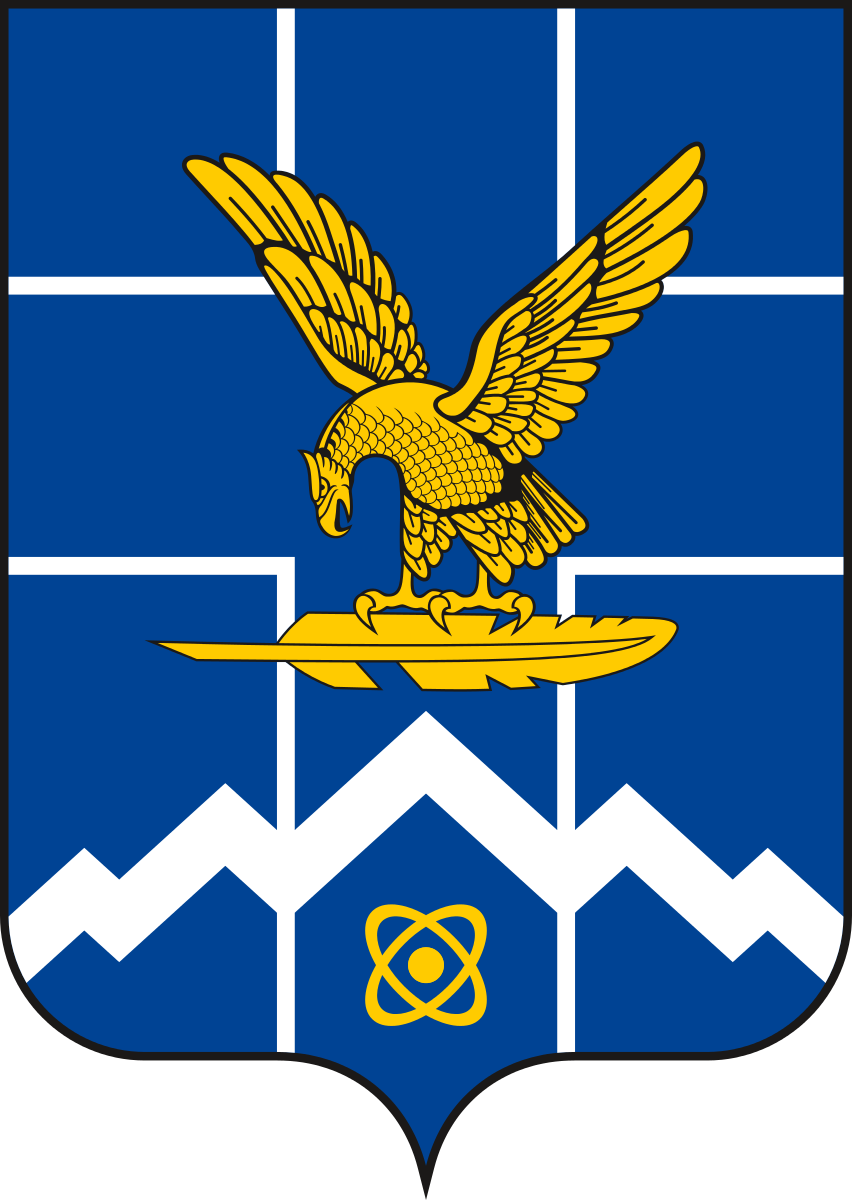
Lermontov

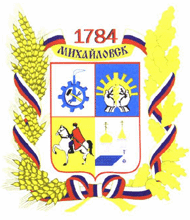
Mikhaylovsk

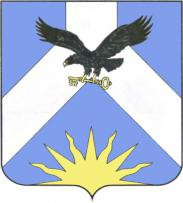
Mineralnye Vody

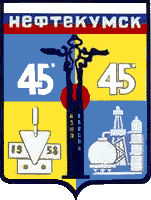
Neftekumsk

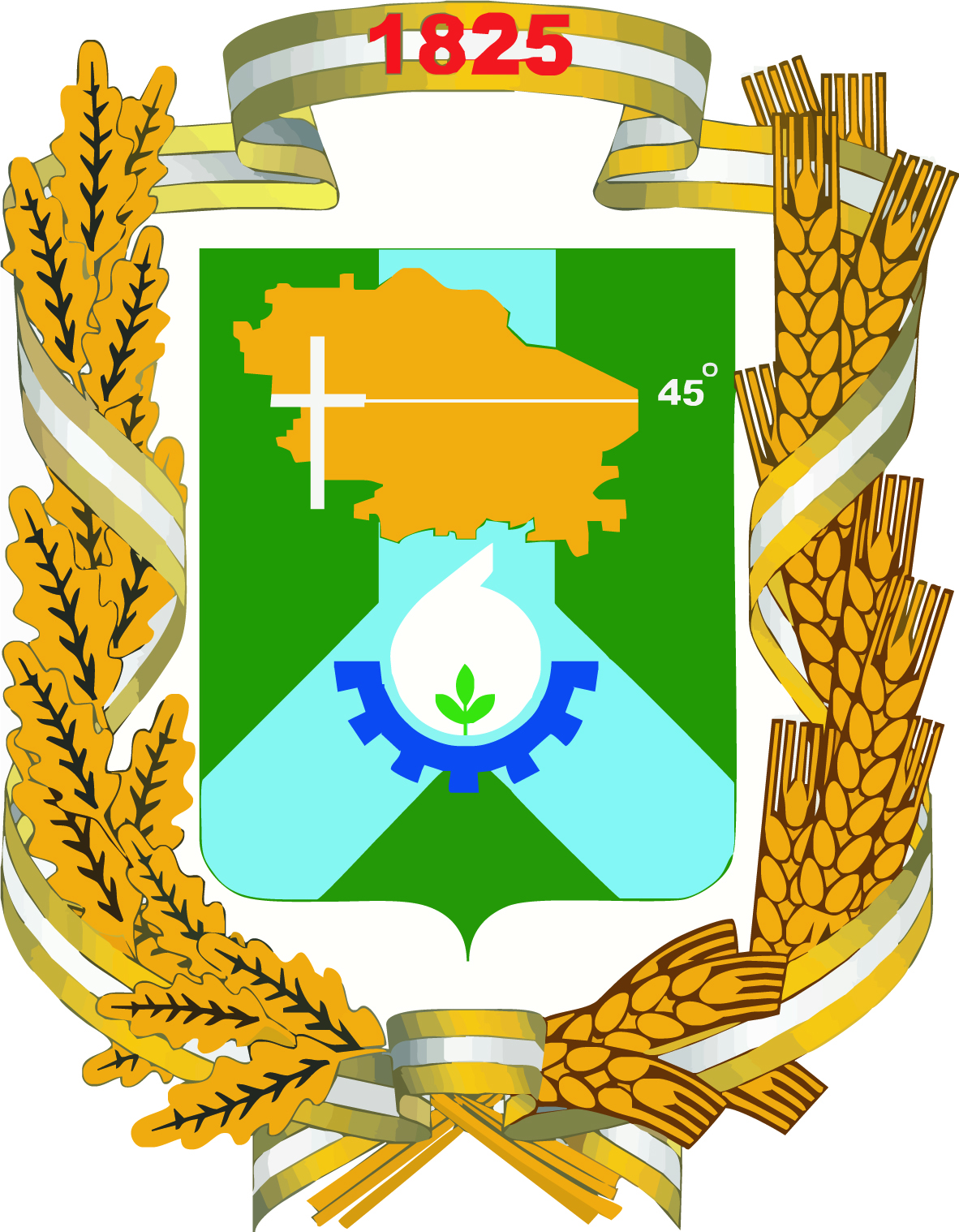
Nevinnomyssk

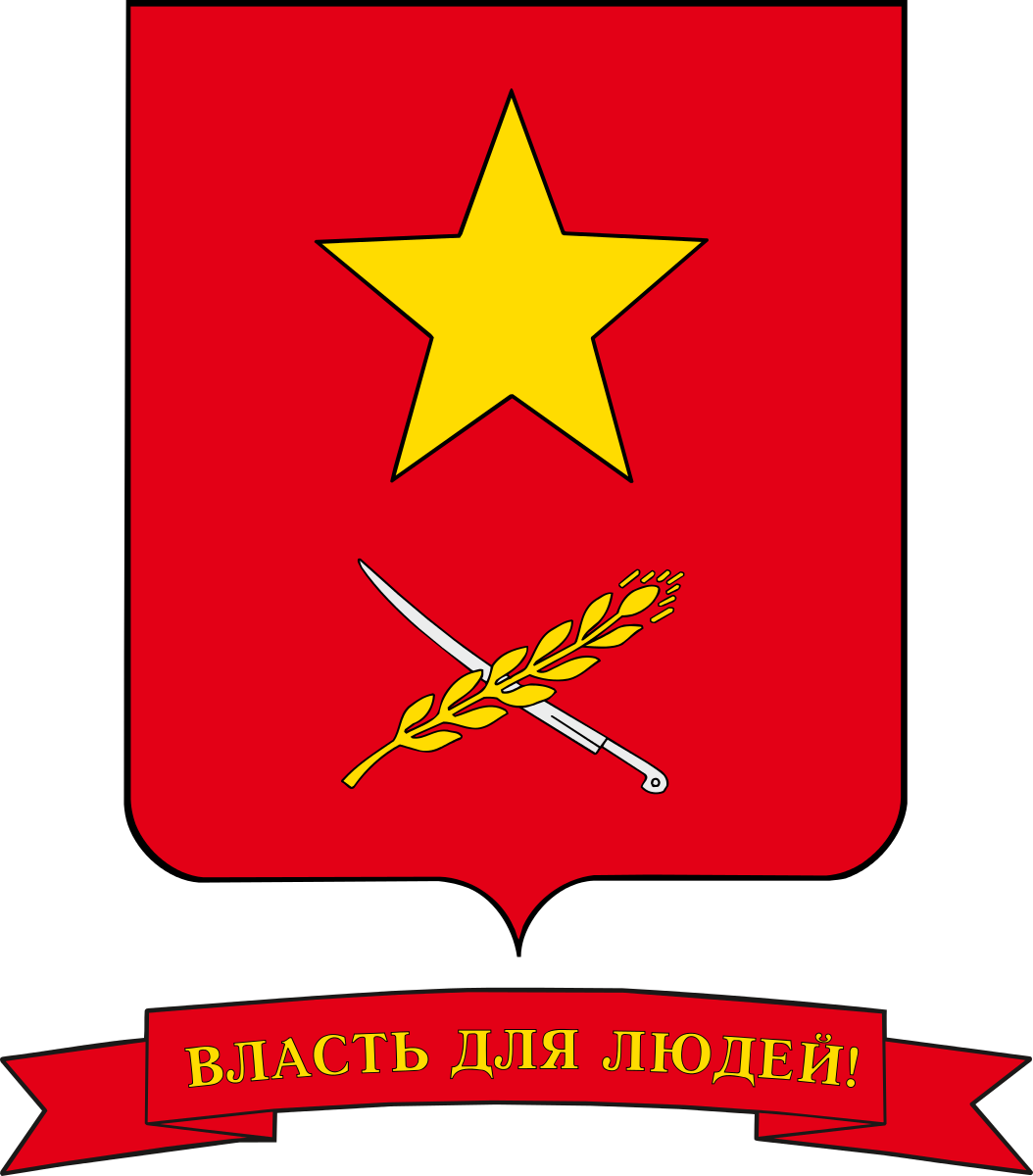
Novoalexandrovsk

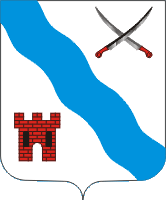
Novopavlovsk

Pyatigorsk

Solnechnodolsk

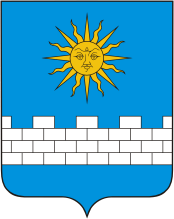
Svetlograd

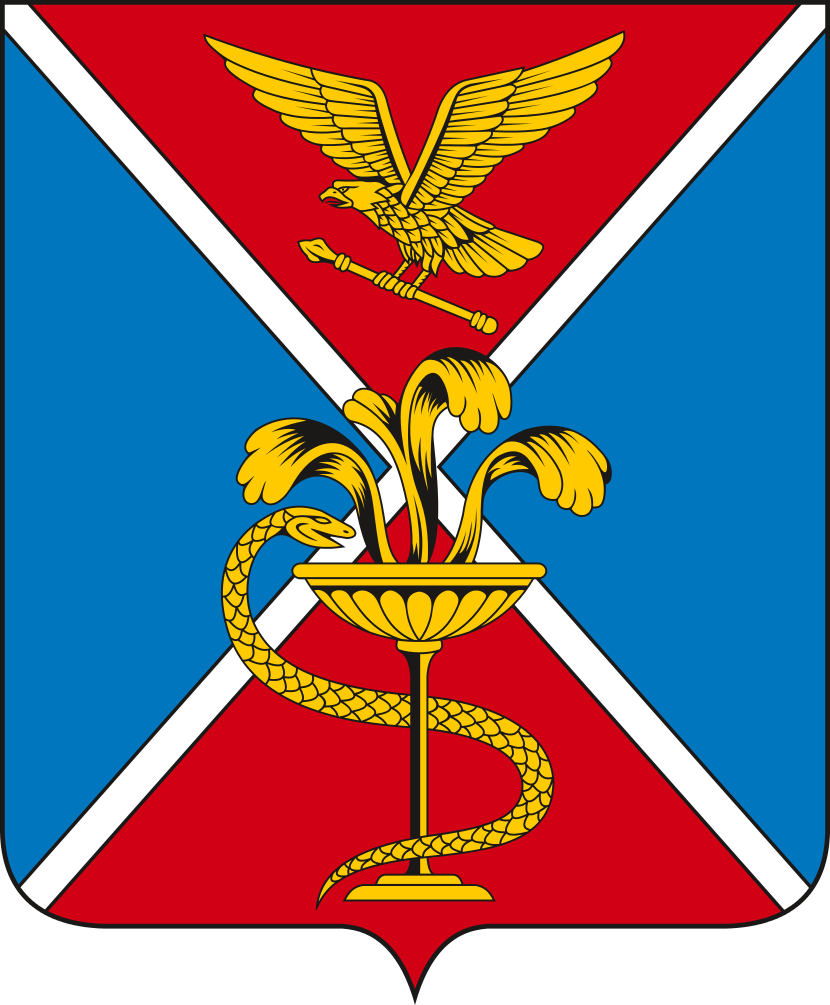
Yessentuki

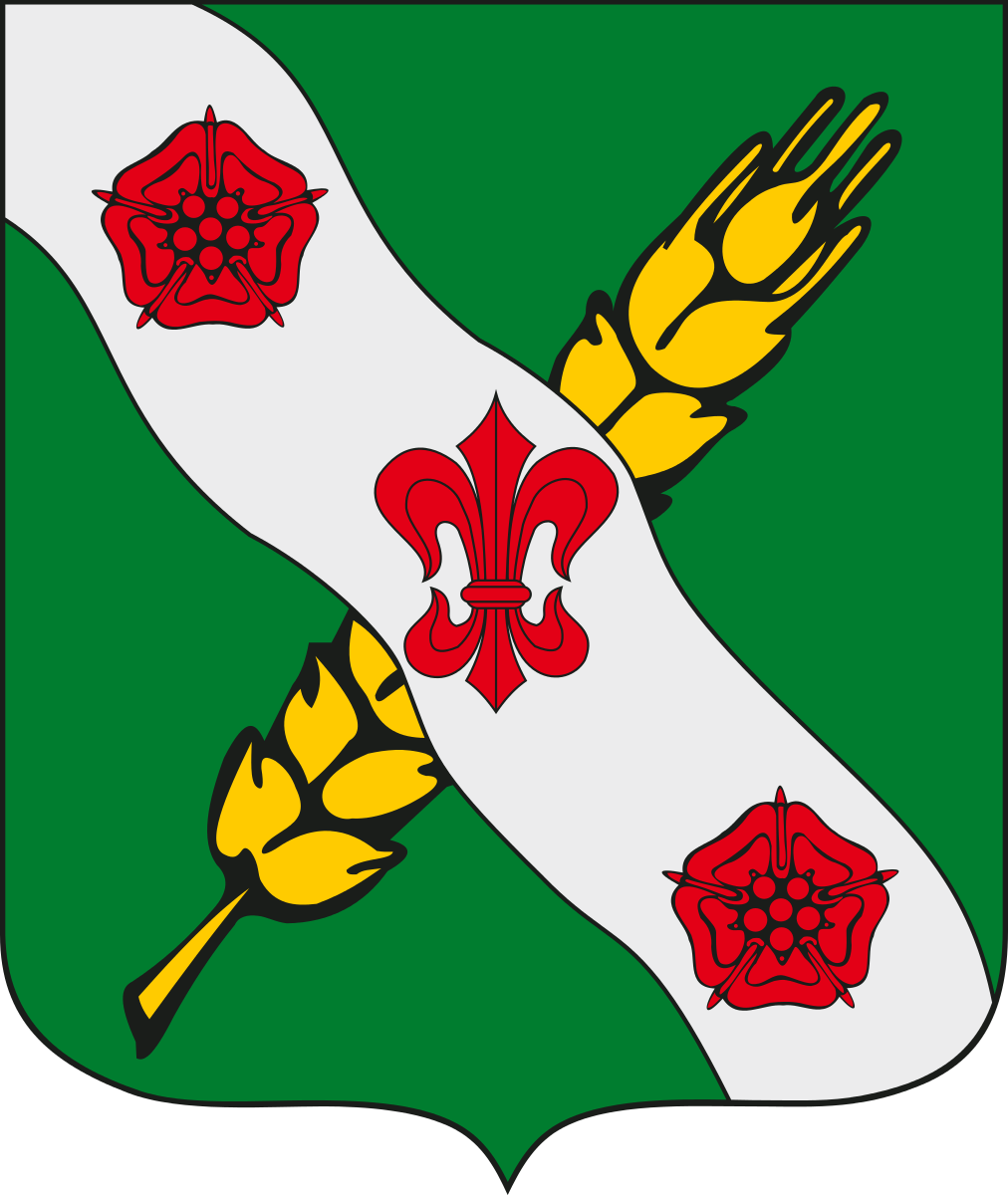
Zelenokumsk

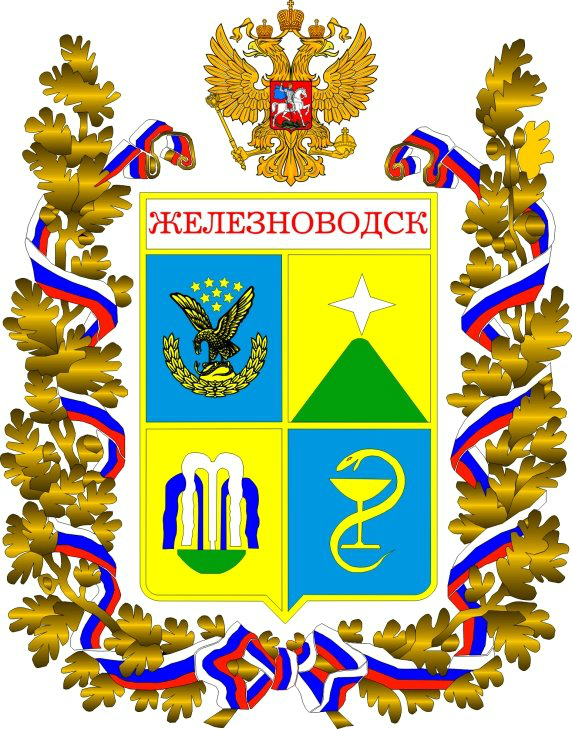
Zheleznovodsk

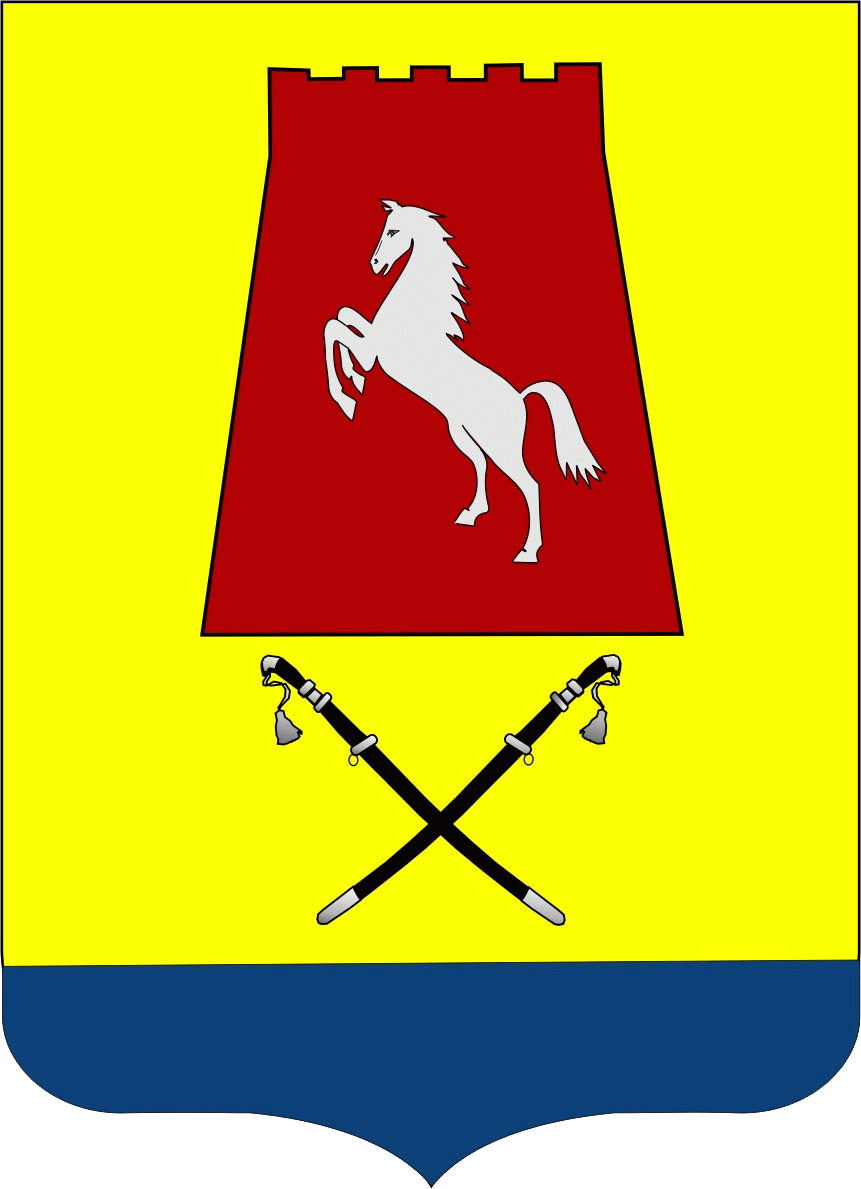
Alexandrovsky District

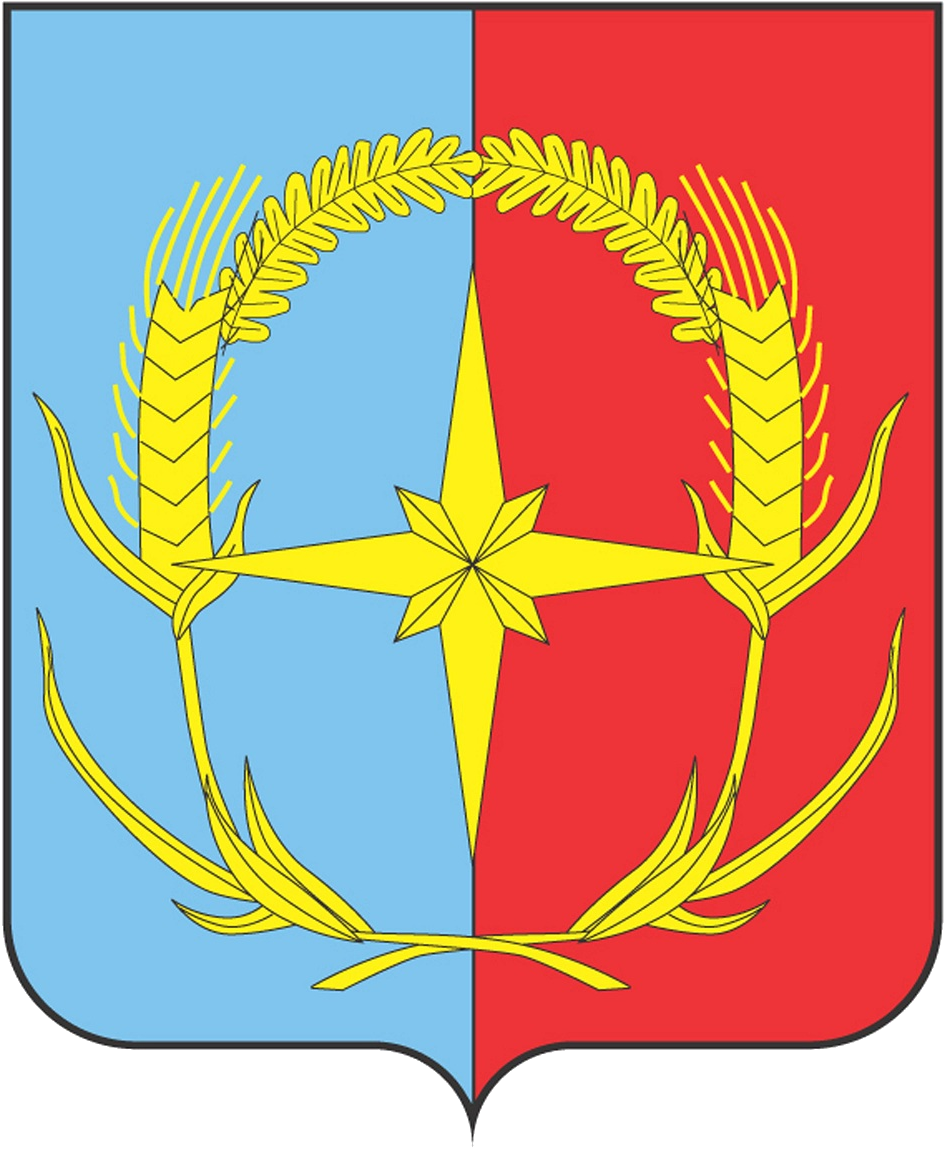
Andropovsky District

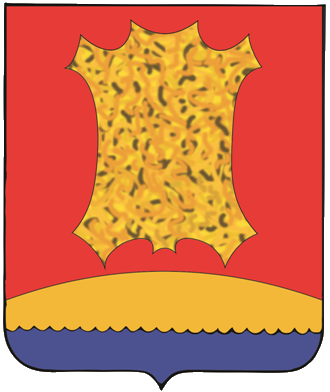
Apanasenkovsky District

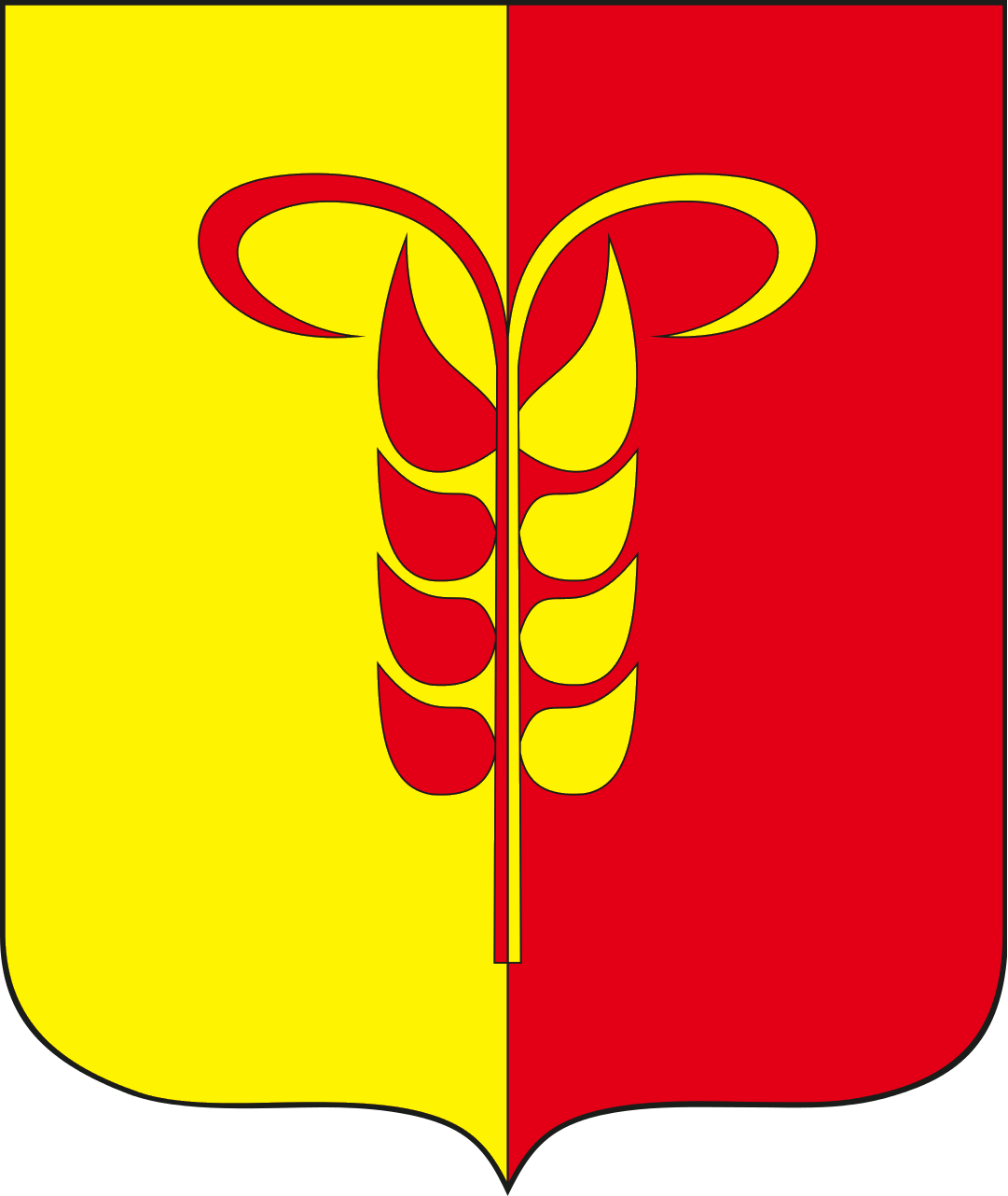
Arzgirsky District

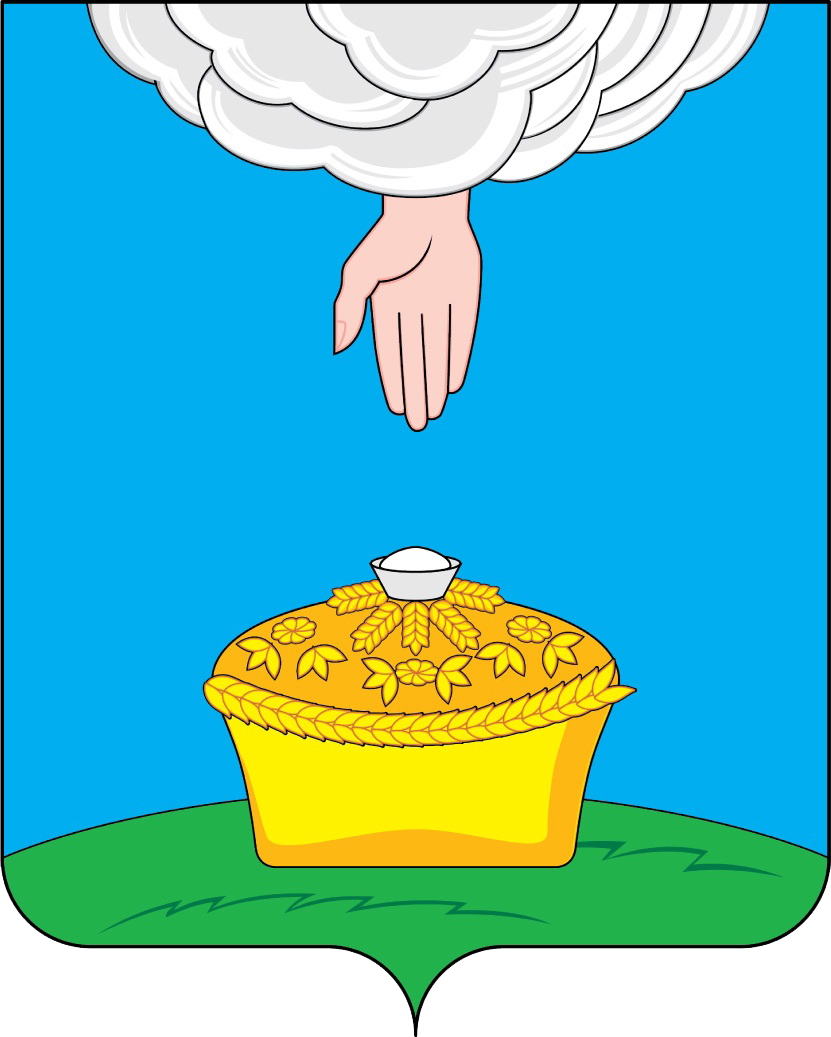
Blagodarnensky District

Budyonnovsky District

Georgiyevsky District

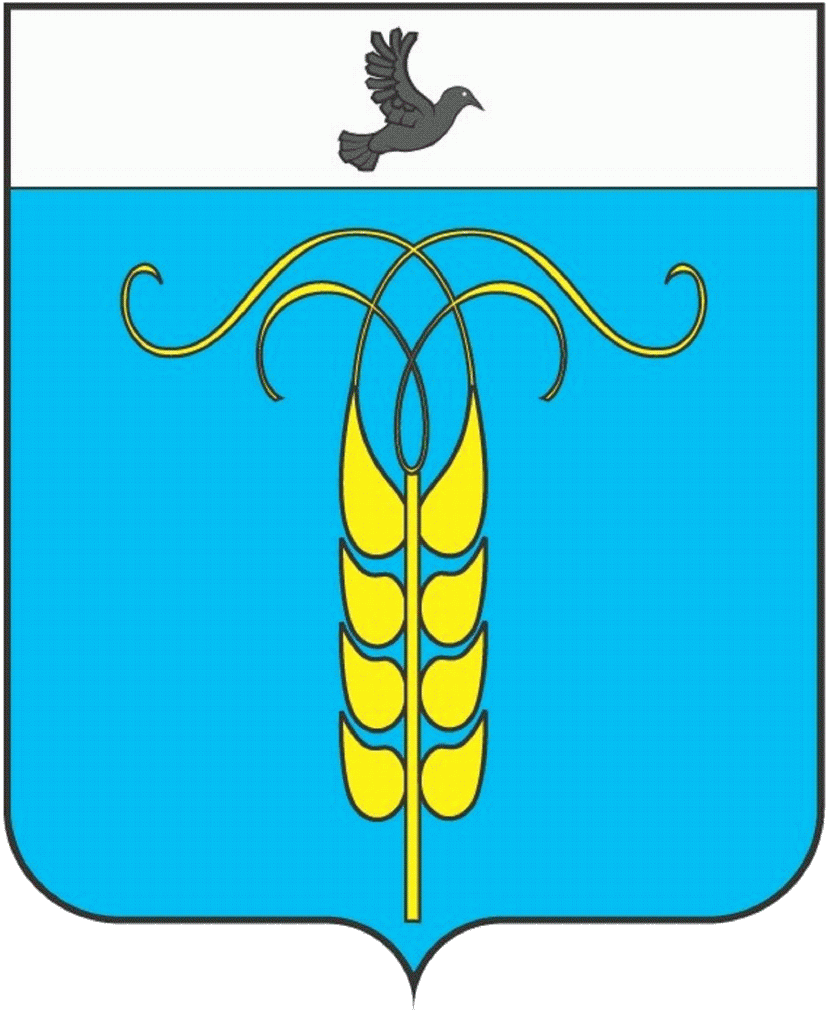
Grachyovsky District, Stavropol Krai

Ipatovsky District

Izobilnensky District

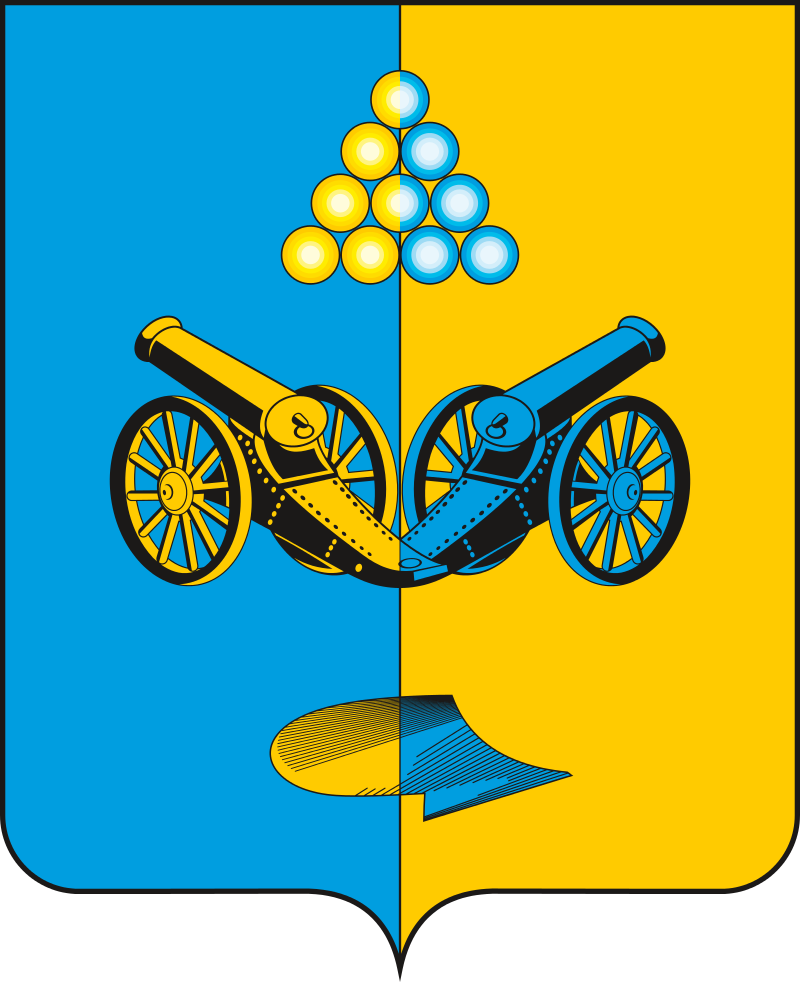
Kirovsky District

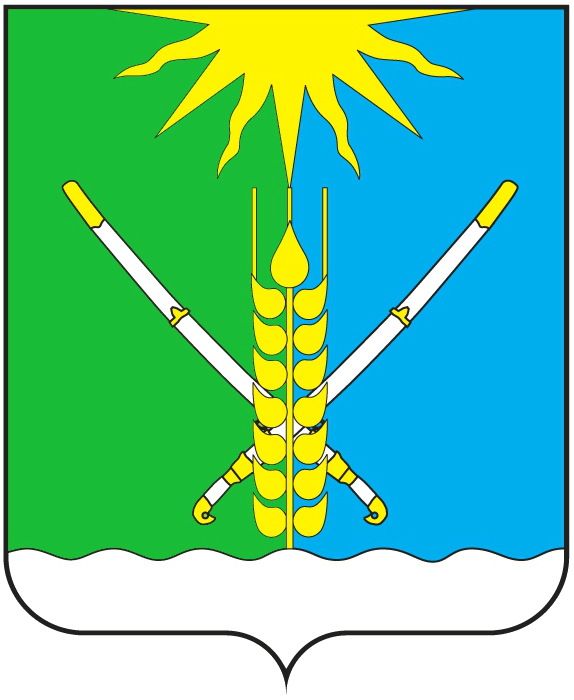
Kochubeyevsky District

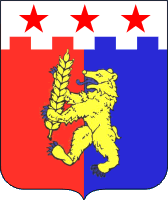
Krasnogvardeysky District

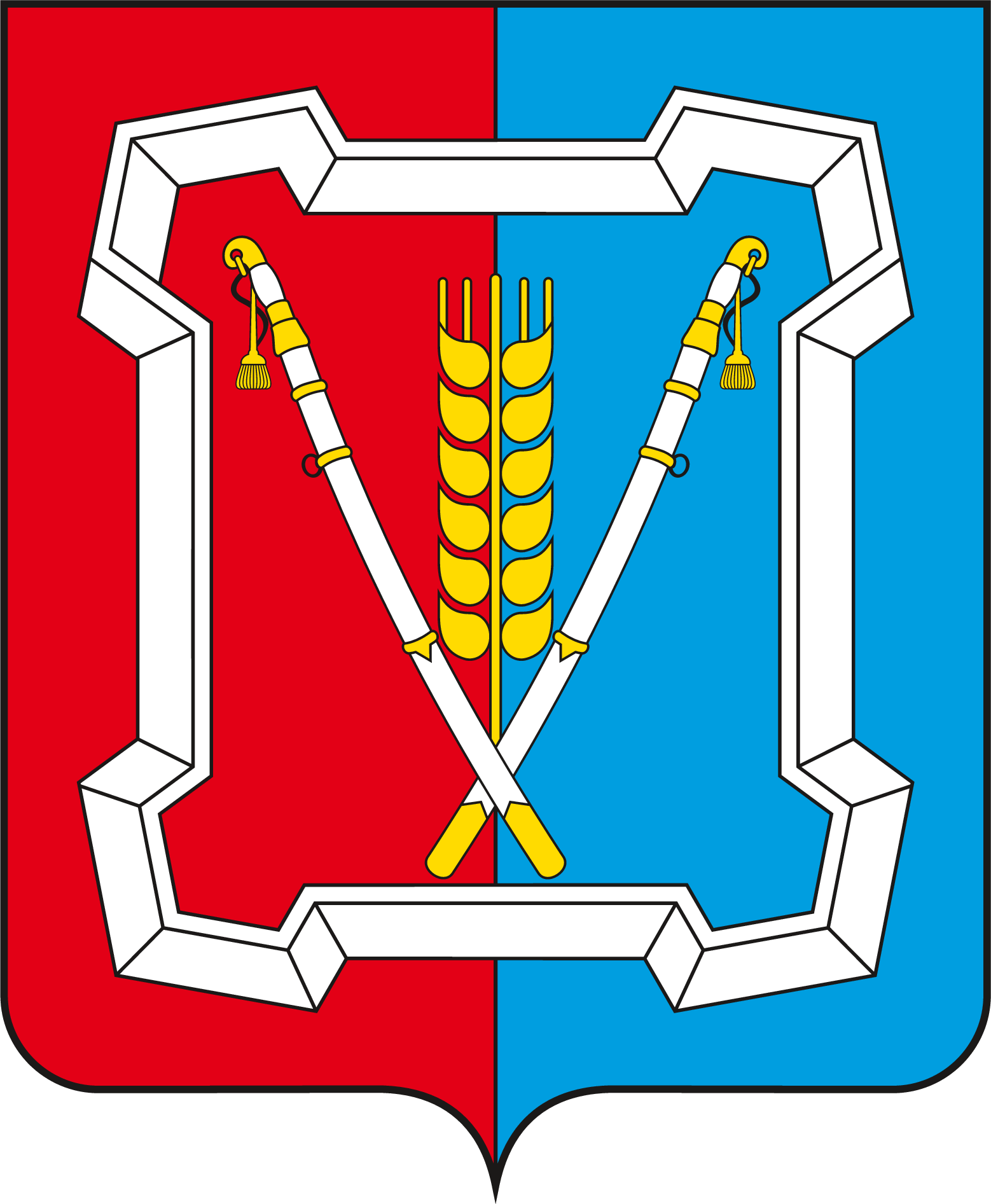
Kursky District

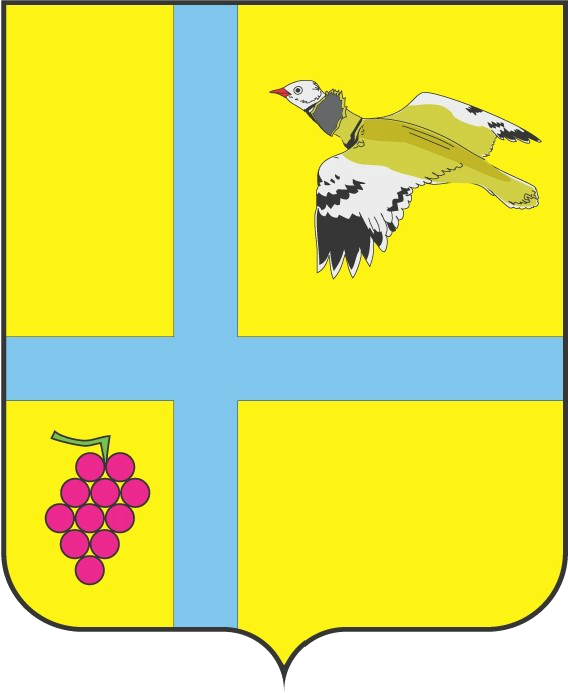
Levokumsky District

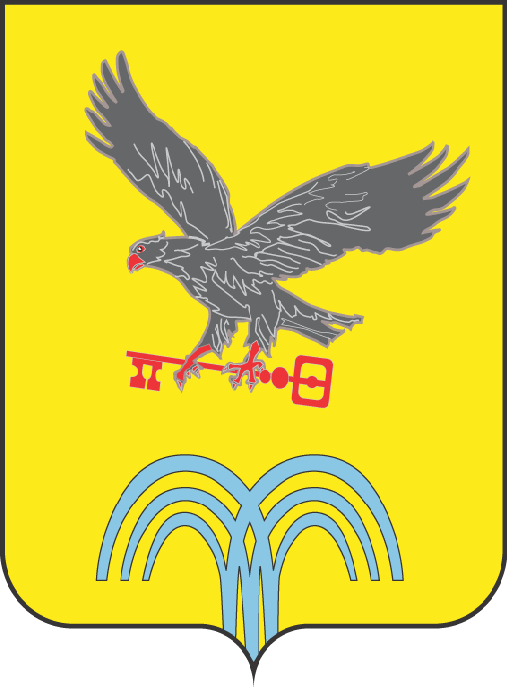
Mineralovodsky District

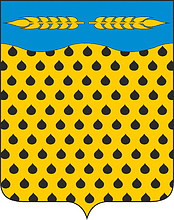
Neftekumsky District

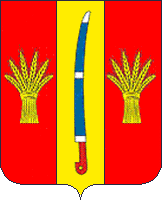
Novoalexandrovsky District

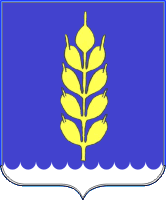
Novoselitsky District

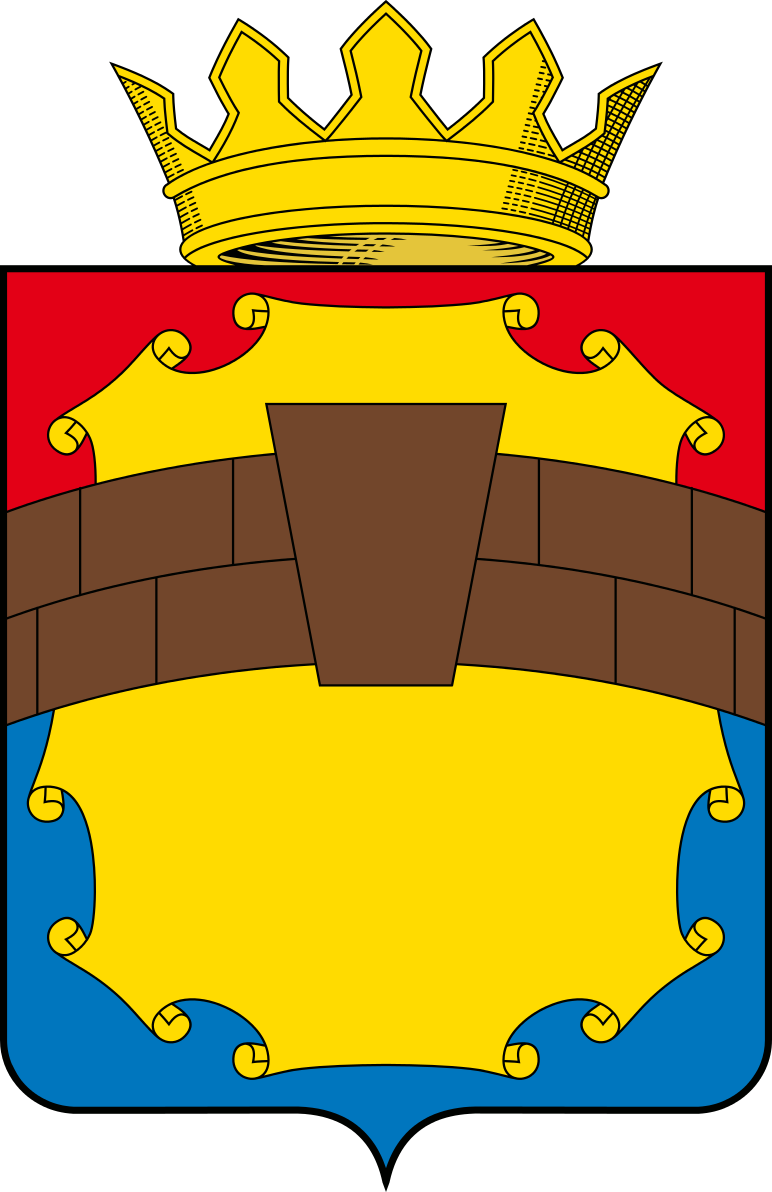
Petrovsky District

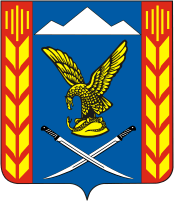
Predgorny District

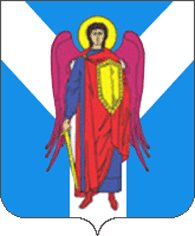
Shpakovsky District

Sovetsky District

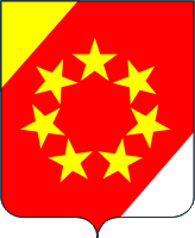
Stepnovsky District

Trunovsky District

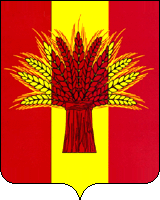
Turkmensky District

== Zabaykalsky Krai ==
Chita

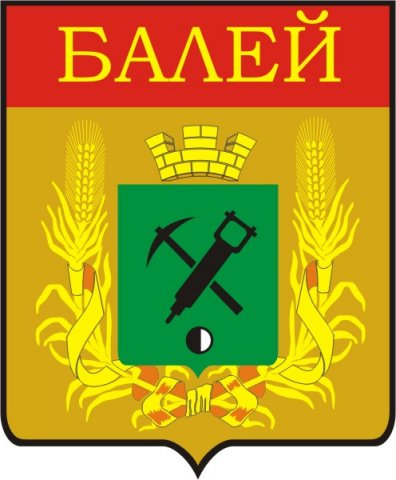
Baley

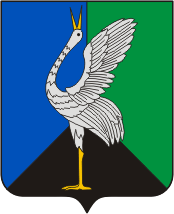
Borzya

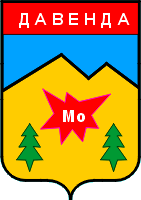
Davenda

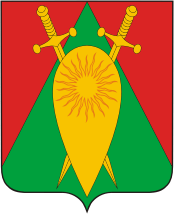
Gorny

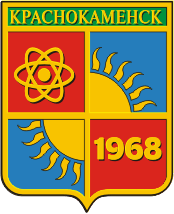
Krasnokamensk

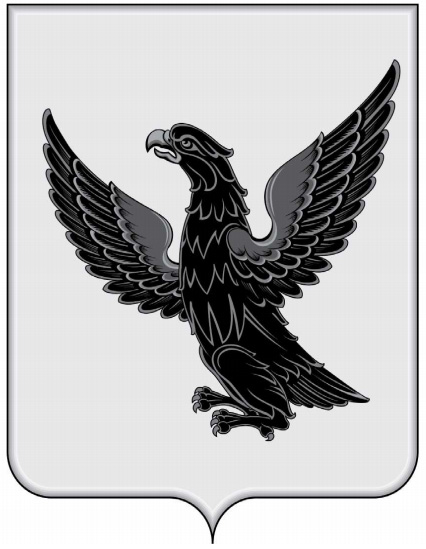
Nerchinsk

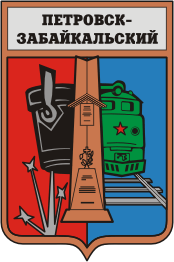
Petrovsk-Zabaykalsky

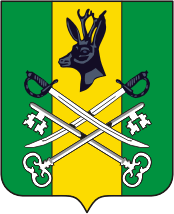
Shilka

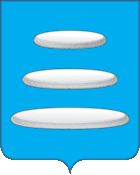
Sretensk

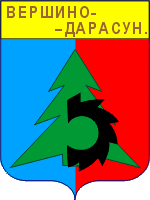
Vershino-Darasunsky

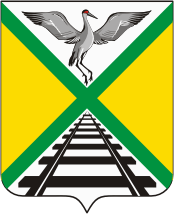
Zabaykalsk

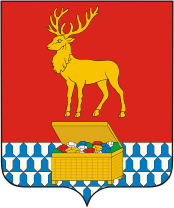
Kalarsky District

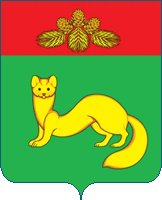
Krasnochikoysky District

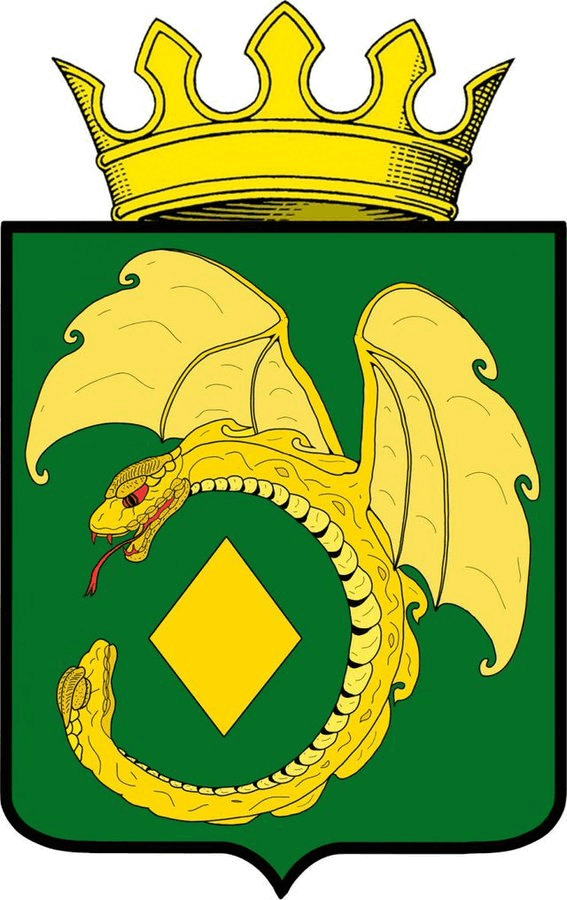
Mogochinsky District

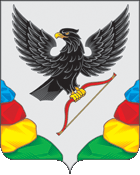
Nerchinsky District

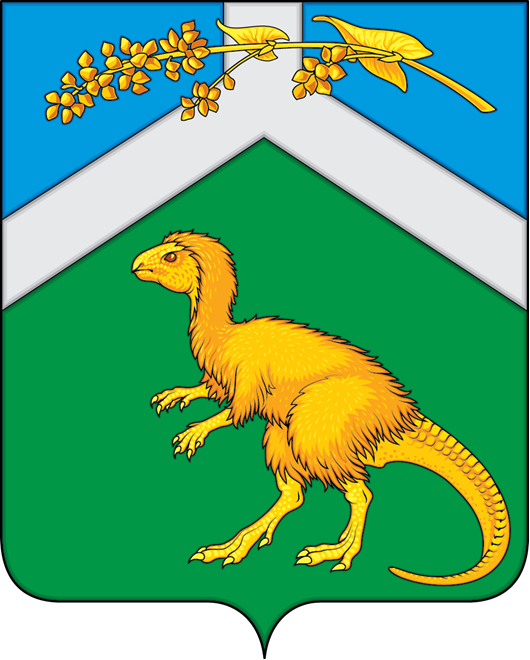
Chernyshevsky District

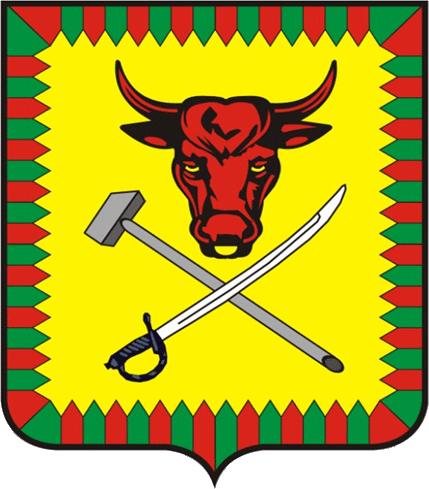
Chitinsky District

== Jewish Autonomous Oblast ==
Birobidzhan

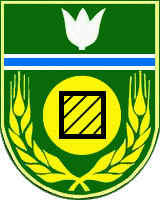
Birobidzhansky District

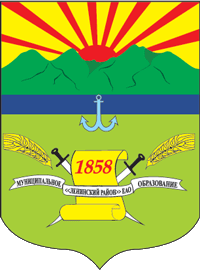
Leninsky District

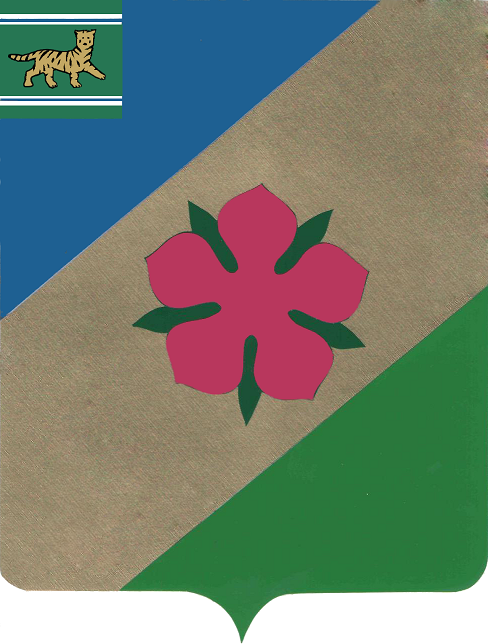
Obluchensky District

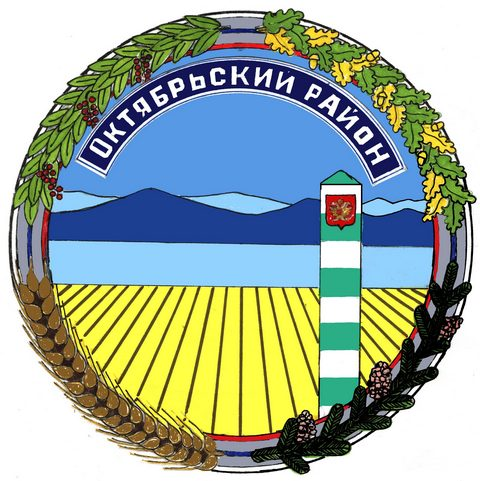
Oktyabrsky District

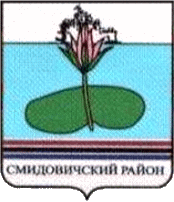
Smidovichsky District

== Chukotka Autonomous Okrug ==
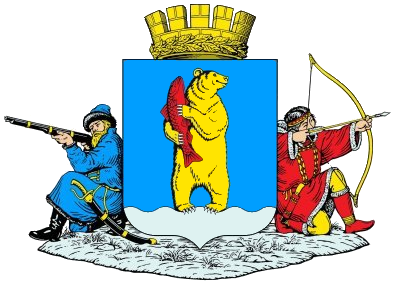
Anadyr

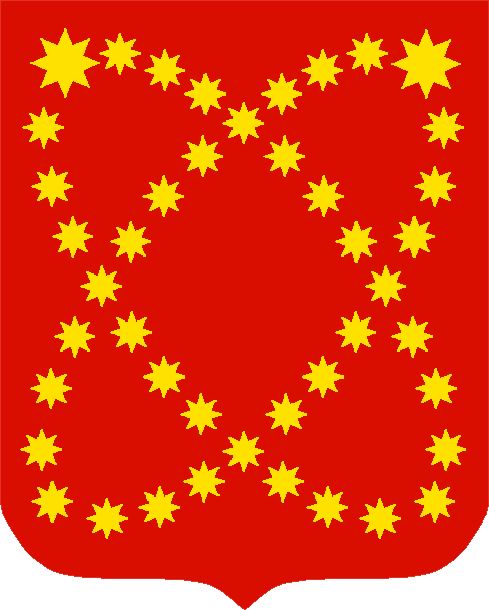
Bilibino

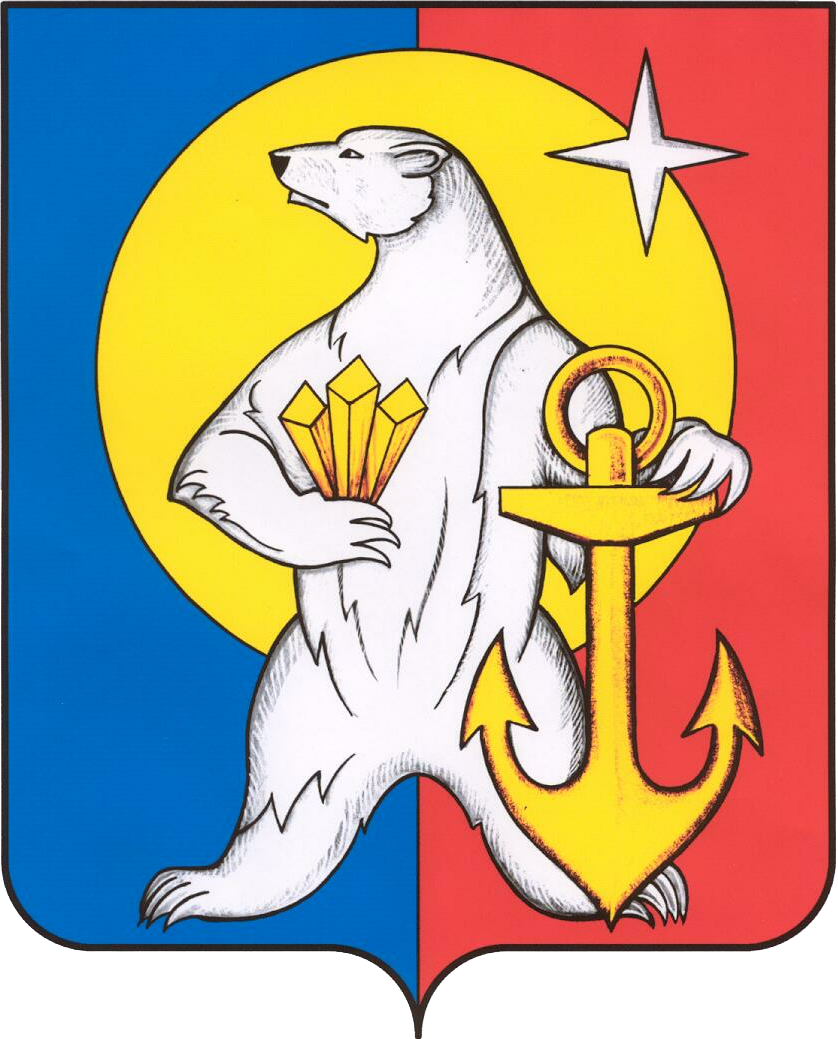
Pevek

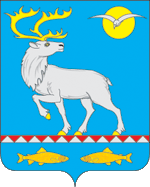
Anadyrsky District

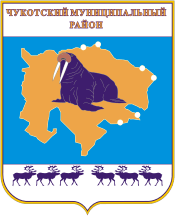
Chukotsky District

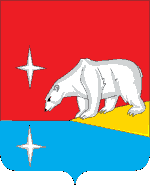
Iultinsky District

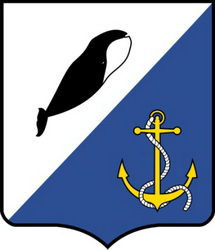
Providensky District

== Khanty-Mansi Autonomous Okrug ==
Khanty-Mansiysk

Barsovo

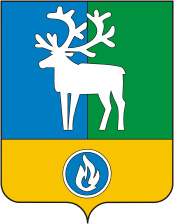
Beloyarsky

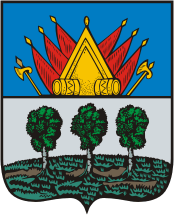
Beryozovo

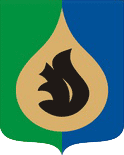
Fyodorovsky

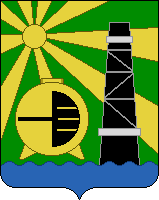
Igrim

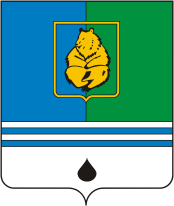
Kogalym

Langepas

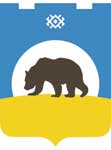
Lyantor

Megion

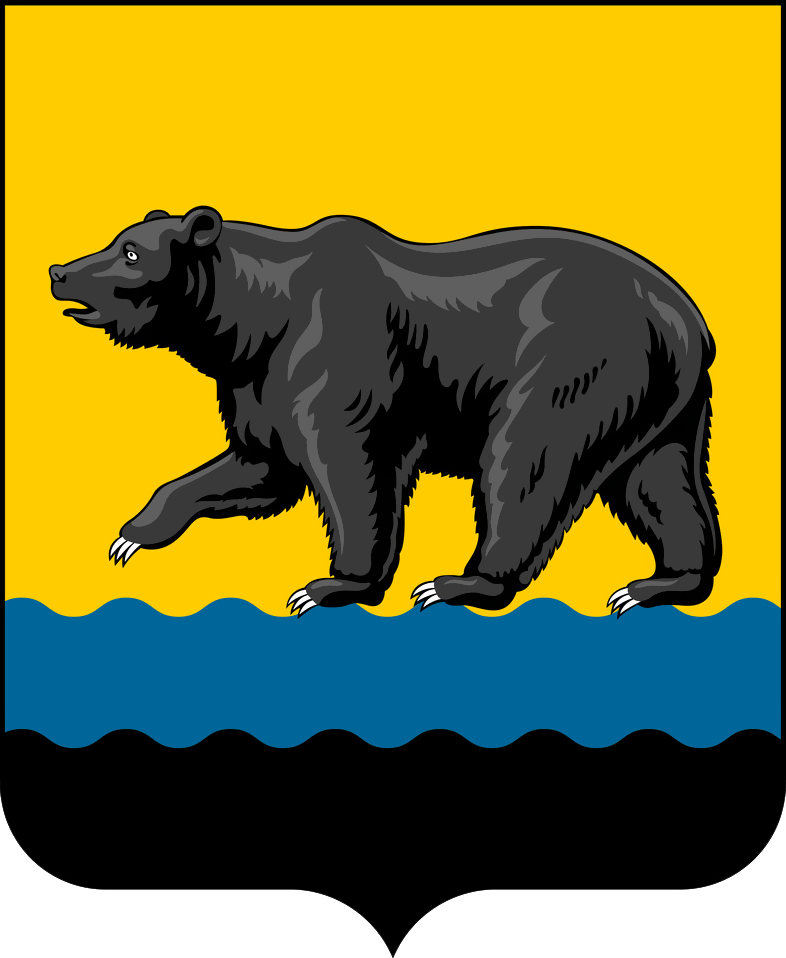
Nefteyugansk

Nizhnevartovsk

Nyagan

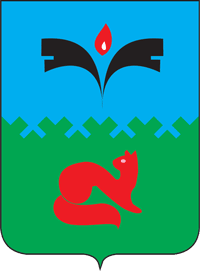
Pokachi

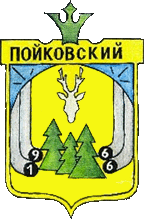
Poykovsky

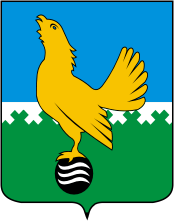
Pyt-Yakh

Surgut

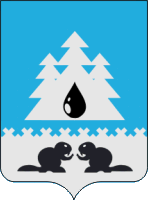
Sovetsky

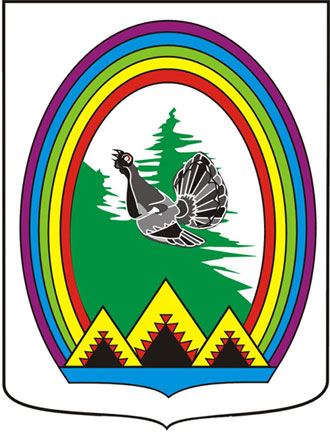
Raduzhny

Uray

Vysoky

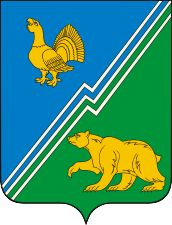
Yugorsk

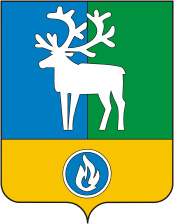
Beloyarsky District

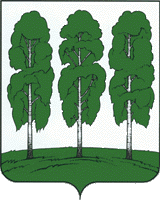
Beryozovsky District

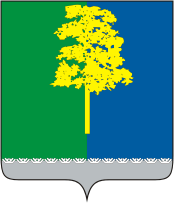
Kondinsky District

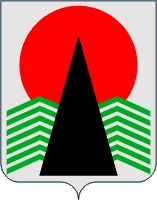
Nefteyugansky District

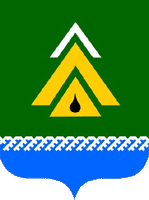
Nizhnevartovsky District

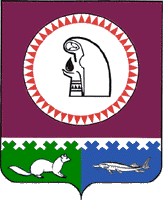
Oktyabrsky District

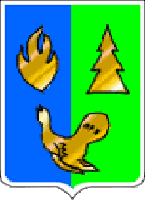
Sovetsky District

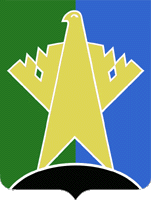
Surgutsky District

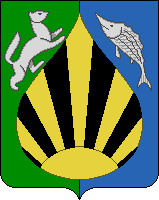
Khanty-Mansiysky District

== Nenets Autonomous Okrug ==
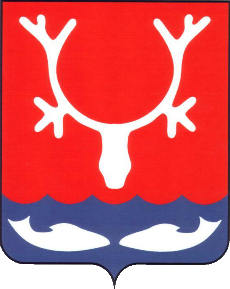
Naryan-Mar

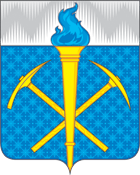
Iskateley

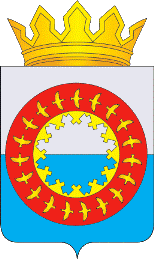
Zapolyarny District

== Yamalo-Nenets Autonomous Okrug ==
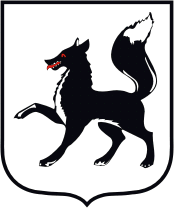
Salekhard

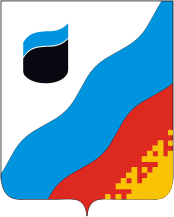
Gubkinsky

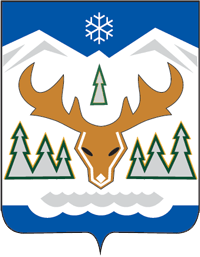
Labytnangi

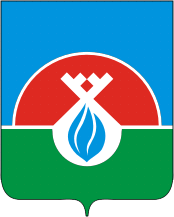
Nadym

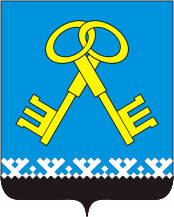
Muravlenko

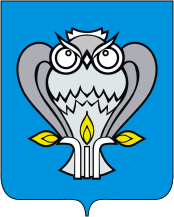
Novy Urengoy

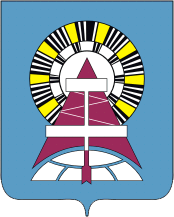
Noyabrsk

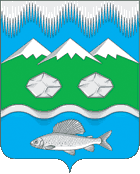
Kharp

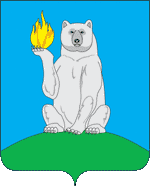
Pangody

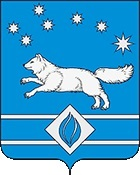
Zapolyarny

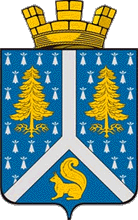
Tarko-Sale

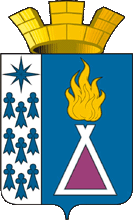
Urengoy

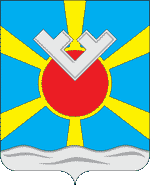
Tazovsky

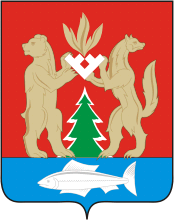
Krasnoselkupsky District

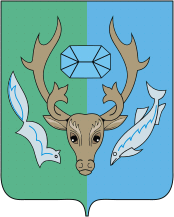
Priuralsky District

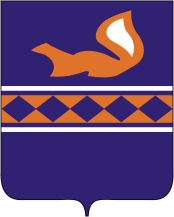
Purovsky District

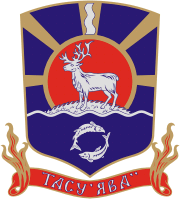
Tazovsky District

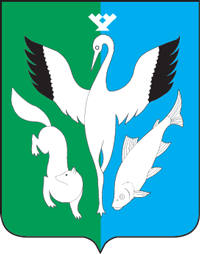
Shuryshkarsky District

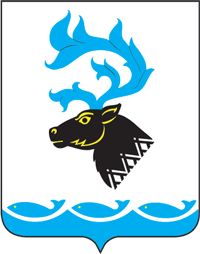
Yamalsky District

== Outside Russia ==
Baikonur

== See also ==
- Flags of the federal subjects of Russia
- Coat of arms of Russia
- Emblems of the Soviet Republics
