= Asbest constituency =

Constituency of the State Duma of the Russian Federation

Asbest single-member constituency
- Constituency of the Russian State Duma

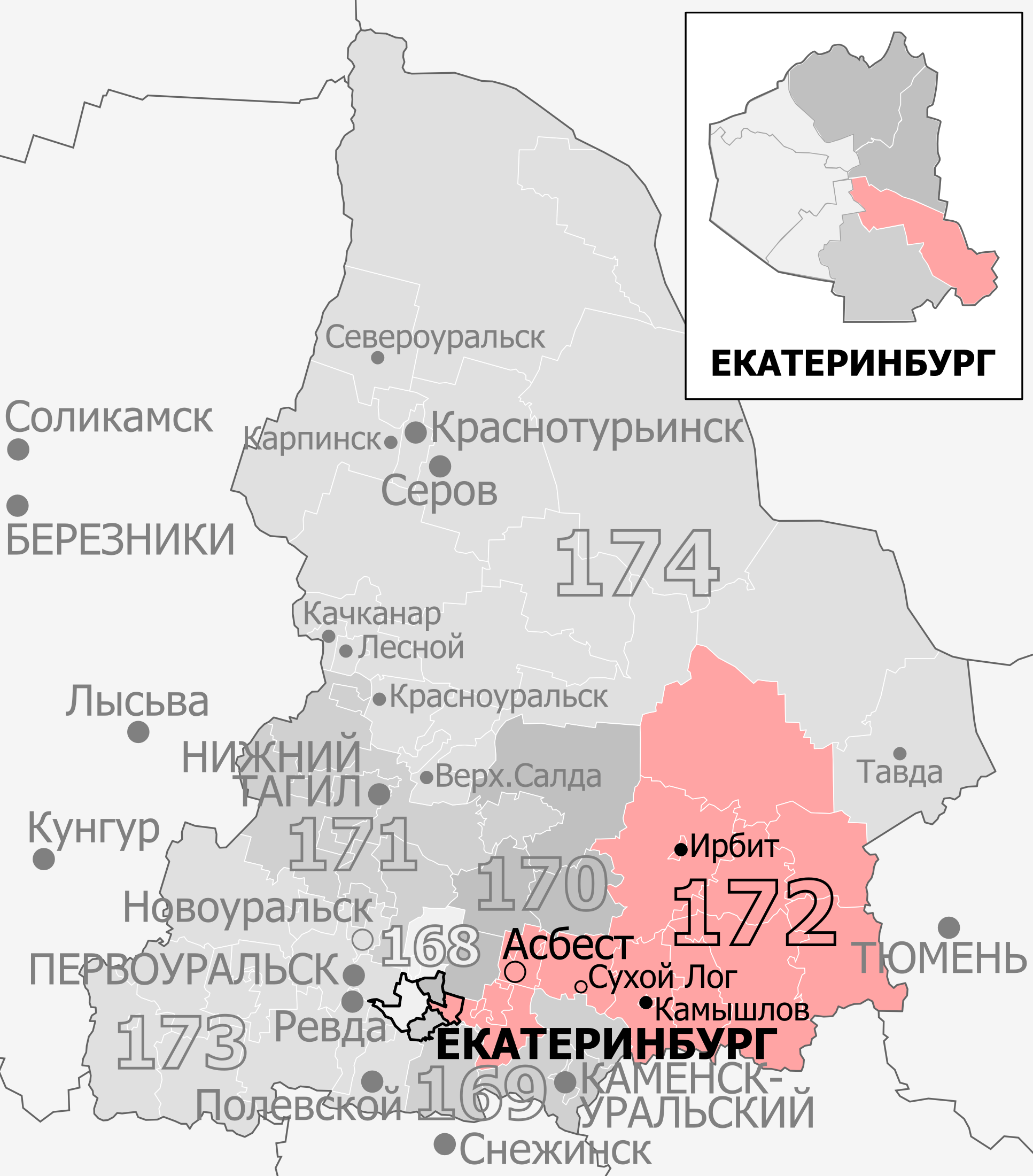
- Constituency boundaries since 2016
- Deputy: Zhanna Ryabtseva; United Russia
- Federal subject: Sverdlovsk Oblast
- Districts: Asbest, Baykalovsky, Beloyarsky, Irbit, Irbitsky, Kamyshlov, Kamyshlovsky, Malysheva, Pyshminsky, Reftinsky, Slobodo-Turinsky, Sukholozhsky, Talitsky, Tugulymsky, Turinsky, Verkhneye Dubrovo, Yekaterinburg (Oktyabrsky), Zarechny
- Voters: 472,210 (2026)

The Asbest constituency (No.173 (Note: Artyomovsky constituency No. 160 in 1993-1995, Artyomovsky constituency No. 161 in 1995-2007, No.172 in 2016–2026)) is a Russian legislative constituency in Sverdlovsk Oblast. The constituency stretches from central Yekaterinburg eastwards to industrial and mining towns Asbest, Zarechny, Sukhoy Log and then to largely rural south-eastern Sverdlovsk Oblast.

The constituency has been represented since 2026 by United Russia deputy Zhanna Ryabtseva, two-term State Duma member and former All-Russia People's Front regional office executive chairwoman, who won the open seat after two-term United Russia incumbent Maksim Ivanov withdrew from the primary.

== Boundaries ==
1993–1995 Artyomovsky constituency: Alapayevsk, Alapayevsky District, Artyomovsky, Artyomovsky District, Baykalovsky District, Irbit, Irbitsky District, Kamyshlov, Kamyshlovsky District, Nevyansk, Nevyansky District, Pyshminsky District, Rezh, Rezhevsky District, Slobodo-Turinsky District, Taborinsky District, Talitsky District, Tavda, Tavdinsky District, Tugulymsky District, Turinsky District
The constituency covered south-eastern Sverdlovsk Oblast, including Alapayevsk, Artyomovsky, Irbit, Kamyshlov, Nevyansk, Rezh and Tavda.

1995–2007 Artyomovsky constituency: Alapayevsk, Alapayevsky District, Artyomovsky District, Baykalovsky District, Irbit, Irbitsky District, Kamyshlov, Kamyshlovsky District, Nizhnyaya Salda, Pyshminsky District, Rezhevsky District, Slobodo-Turinsky District, Svobodny, Taborinsky District, Talitsky District, Tavdinsky District, Tugulymsky District, Turinsky District, Verkhnesaldinsky District
After the 1995 redistricting the constituency was significantly altered, swapping Nevyansk for Nizhnyaya Salda and Verkhnyaya Salda with Nizhny Tagil constituency in central Sverdlovsk Oblast.

2016–present: Asbest, Baykalovsky District, Beloyarsky District, Artyomovsky District, Irbit, Irbitsky District, Kamyshlov, Kamyshlovsky District, Malysheva, Pyshminsky District, Reftinsky, Slobodo-Turinsky District, Sukholozhsky District, Talitsky District, Tugulymsky District, Turinsky District, Verkhneye Dubrovo, Yekaterinburg (Oktyabrsky), Zarechny
The constituency was re-created for the 2016 election under the name "Asbest constituency" and retained only south-eastern corner of Sverdlovsk Oblast, losing Nizhnyaya Salda, Verkhnyaya Salda, Tavda and Taborinsky District districts to Serov constituency, Alapayevsky District, Rezh and Artyomovsky – to Beryozovsky constituency, and Alapayevsk – to Nizhny Tagil constituency. This seat instead gained Beloyarsky District, Sukhoy Log and Asbest from Kamensk-Uralsky constituency as well as Oktyabrsky City District of Yekaterinburg from Ordzhonikidzevsky constituency.

== Members elected ==
| Election | Member | Party |
|---|---|---|
| 1993 | Tamara Tokareva | Agrarian Party |
| 1995 | Svetlana Gvozdeva | Yabloko |
| 1999 | Svetlana Gvozdeva | Unity |
| 2003 | Igor Barinov | United Russia |
| 2007 | Proportional representation - no election by constituency | |
| 2011 | Proportional representation - no election by constituency | |
| 2016 | Maksim Ivanov | United Russia |
| 2021 | Maksim Ivanov | United Russia |
| 2026 | Zhanna Ryabtseva | United Russia |

== Election results ==
=== 1993 ===
Summary of the 12 December 1993 Russian legislative election in the Artyomovsky constituency
| Candidate | Party | Votes | % |
|---|---|---|---|
| Tamara Tokareva | Agrarian Party | 72,640 | 29.81% |
| Igor Prudnikov | Democratic Party | 47,104 | 19.33% |
| Valery Novoselov | Communist Party | 30,169 | 12.38% |
| Vyacheslav Senko | Liberal Democratic Party | 29,220 | 11.99% |
| Yury Borisikhin | Party of Russian Unity and Accord | 18,237 | 7.48% |
| against all | | 28,357 | 11.71% |
| Total | | 243,717 | 100% |

=== 1995 ===
Summary of the 17 December 1995 Russian legislative election in the Artyomovsky constituency
| Candidate | Party | Votes | % |
|---|---|---|---|
| Svetlana Gvozdeva | Yabloko | 49,465 | 17.14% |
| Tamara Tokareva (incumbent) | Agrarian Party | 34,466 | 11.94% |
| Vladimir Raldugin | Forward, Russia! | 32,138 | 11.13% |
| Valery Novoselov | Communist Party | 28,830 | 9.99% |
| Vladimir Alekseyev | Communists and Working Russia - for the Soviet Union | 25,829 | 8.95% |
| Yury Alekseyev | Independent | 23,696 | 8.21% |
| Igor Oks | Independent | 21,569 | 7.47% |
| Gennady Mityayev | Liberal Democratic Party | 18,593 | 6.44% |
| Dmitry Dontsov | Party of Russian Unity and Accord | 11,331 | 3.93% |
| Sergey Feopentov | Independent | 8,398 | 2.91% |
| Valery Romanov | Independent | 3,563 | 1.23% |
| against all | | 25,779 | 8.93% |
| Total | | 288,640 | 100% |

=== 1999 ===
Summary of the 19 December 1999 Russian legislative election in the Artyomovsky constituency
| Candidate | Party | Votes | % |
|---|---|---|---|
| Svetlana Gvozdeva (incumbent) | Unity | 57,120 | 22.13% |
| Dmitry Golovanov | Russian Socialist Party | 50,222 | 19.46% |
| Tatyana Merzlyakova | Fatherland – All Russia | 30,741 | 11.91% |
| Valery Novoselov | Communist Party | 26,173 | 10.14% |
| Aleksandr Kosintsev | Yabloko | 26,001 | 10.07% |
| Vladimir Skubak | Independent | 13,743 | 5.32% |
| Nikolay Klimenko | Party of Pensioners | 9,659 | 3.74% |
| Aleksandr Mironov | Independent | 4,573 | 1.77% |
| Vyacheslav Pelevin | Independent | 3,339 | 1.29% |
| Igor Konakov | Independent | 2,699 | 1.05% |
| Dmitry Pitersky | Independent | 1,508 | 0.58% |
| Aleksandr Trifonov | Spiritual Heritage | 1,337 | 0.52% |
| Pyotr Kikilyk | Independent | 994 | 0.39% |
| against all | | 23,829 | 9.23% |
| Total | | 258,134 | 100% |

=== 2003 ===
Summary of the 7 December 2003 Russian legislative election in the Artyomovsky constituency
| Candidate | Party | Votes | % |
|---|---|---|---|
| Igor Barinov | United Russia | 82,513 | 36.16% |
| Aleksandr Burkov | Party of Russia's Rebirth-Russian Party of Life | 43,426 | 19.03% |
| Yury Kuznetsov | Yabloko | 40,825 | 17.98% |
| Vladimir Kadochnikov | Communist Party | 21,438 | 9.40% |
| Tamara Rusakova | Liberal Democratic Party | 6,705 | 2.94% |
| Fyodor Sobolev | Independent | 3,962 | 1.74% |
| Aleksandr Ilmanov | Russian Pensioners' Party-Party of Social Justice | 3,779 | 1.66% |
| Vladimir Drobov | Agrarian Party | 3,506 | 1.54% |
| Aleksandr Kamyanchuk | Independent | 2,551 | 1.12% |
| Vladimir Gerasimenko | Development of Enterprise | 858 | 0.38% |
| against all | | 14,704 | 6.44% |
| Total | | 228,272 | 100% |

=== 2016 ===
Summary of the 18 September 2016 Russian legislative election in the Asbest constituency
| Candidate | Party | Votes | % |
|---|---|---|---|
| Maksim Ivanov | United Russia | 80,891 | 37.70% |
| Igor Toroshchin | Liberal Democratic Party | 36,429 | 16.98% |
| Vladimir Filippov | A Just Russia | 33,507 | 15.61% |
| Denis Belov | Communists of Russia | 15,583 | 7.39% |
| Dmitry Cheremisin | Rodina | 7,774 | 3.62% |
| Sergey Babkin | Party of Growth | 7,620 | 3.55% |
| Sergey Tyurikov | Yabloko | 7,425 | 3.46% |
| Mikhail Tuponogov | The Greens | 3,665 | 1.71% |
| Yevgeny Martyshko | Patriots of Russia | 3,580 | 1.67% |
| Total | | 214,586 | 100% |

=== 2021 ===
Summary of the 17-19 September 2021 Russian legislative election in the Asbest constituency
| Candidate | Party | Votes | % |
|---|---|---|---|
| Maksim Ivanov (incumbent) | United Russia | 93,167 | 38.67% |
| Natalya Krylova | Communist Party | 62,396 | 25.90% |
| Igor Toroshchin | Liberal Democratic Party | 26,090 | 10.83% |
| Roman Isayev | New People | 22,915 | 9.51% |
| Gennady Sevastyanov | Yabloko | 11,225 | 4.66% |
| Maria Prokasheva | Rodina | 6,426 | 2.67% |
| Total | | 240,952 | 100% |

=== 2026 ===
Summary of the 18-20 September 2026 Russian legislative election in the Asbest constituency
| Candidate | Party | Votes | % |
|---|---|---|---|
| Zhanna Ryabtseva | United Russia | 94,521 | 40.12% |
| Yevgeny Shabanov | Communist Party | 55,320 | 23.48% |
| Yevgeny Popov | A Just Russia | 36,074 | 15.31% |
| Natalya Musalnikova | New People | 34,022 | 14.44% |
| Total | | 235,594 | 100% |
