= List of rural localities in Sverdlovsk Oblast =

Map of Russia with Sverdlovsk Oblast highlighted

This is a list of rural localities in Sverdlovsk Oblast. Sverdlovsk Oblast (Свердло́вская о́бласть, Sverdlovskaya oblast) is a federal subject (an oblast) of Russia located in the Ural Federal District. Its administrative center is the city of Yekaterinburg, formerly known as Sverdlovsk. Its population is 4,297,747 (according to the 2010 Census).

== Locations ==
- Abramovo
- Asbestovsky
- Averino
- Baranchinsky
- Baybulda
- Baykalovo
- Gerasimovka
- Isetskoye
- Kakvinskie Pechi
- Lobva
- Pelym
- Sagra
- Tabory
- Turinskaya Sloboda

== See also ==
- Lists of rural localities in Russia
