= Malysheva =

Malysheva (Russian: Малышева) is the name of several inhabited localities in Russia.

== Modern localities ==
- Malysheva, Kurgan Oblast, a selo in Bakharevsky Selsoviet of Kargapolsky District of Kurgan Oblast
- Malysheva, Sverdlovsk Oblast, a work settlement under the administrative jurisdiction of the Town of Asbest in Sverdlovsk Oblast

== Renamed localities ==
- Malysheva, until April 2013, name of the selo of Malyshevo in Malyshevsky Selsoviet of Almenevsky District of Kurgan Oblast
