= Artyomovsky Urban Okrug =

Location of Primorsky Krai in Russia

Location of Sverdlovsk Oblast in Russia

Artyomovsky Urban Okrug is the name of several municipal formations (urban okrugs) in Russia. The following administrative divisions are incorporated as such:

- Artyom City Under Krai Jurisdiction, Primorsky Krai
- Artyomovsky District, Sverdlovsk Oblast

== See also ==
- Artyomovsky (disambiguation)
