= Artyomovsky =

Artyomovsky (masculine) or Artyomovskaya (feminine) may refer to:

- Artyomovsky District, a district of Sverdlovsk Oblast, Russia
- Artyomovsky Urban Okrug, name of several urban okrugs in Russia
- Artyomovsky (inhabited locality) (Artyomovskaya), name of several inhabited localities in Russia
