= Beloyarsk =

Beloyarsk may refer to:

- Beloyarsk, Altai Krai, a former urban-type settlement in Altai Krai, Russia; since 2005—a (rural) settlement
- Beloyarsk, Yamalo-Nenets Autonomous Okrug, a settlement in Yamalo-Nenets Autonomous Okrug, Russia
- Beloyarsk Nuclear Power Station, situated in Beloyarsky District, Sverdlovsk Oblast in Sverdlovsk Oblast, Russia.
