= Verkhneye Dubrovo =

Verkhneye Dubrovo (Russian: Верхнее Дуброво) is the name of several inhabited localities in Russia.

Urban localities

- Verkhneye Dubrovo, Sverdlovsk Oblast, a work settlement in Beloyarsky District of Sverdlovsk Oblast

Rural localities

- Verkhneye Dubrovo, Smolensk Oblast, a village in Prechistenskoye Rural Settlement of Dukhovshchinsky District of Smolensk Oblast
