= Kamyshlovsky =

Kamyshlovsky (masculine), Kamyshlovskaya (feminine), or Kamyshlovskoye (neuter) may refer to:

- Kamyshlovsky District, an administrative and municipal district of Sverdlovsk Oblast, Russia
- Kamyshlovsky Urban Okrug, a municipal formation of Sverdlovsk Oblast, Russia, which the town of Kamyshlov is incorporated as
- Kamyshlovsky (rural locality), a rural locality (a settlement) in Omsk Oblast, Russia
