= Baykalovo =

Baykalovo (Russian: Байкалово) is the name of several rural localities in Russia:

- Baykalovo, Arkhangelsk Oblast, a village in Lastolsky Selsoviet of Primorsky District of Arkhangelsk Oblast
- Baykalovo, Kirov Oblast, a village under the administrative jurisdiction of the urban-type settlement of Demyanovo in Podosinovsky District of Kirov Oblast
- Baykalovo, Krasnoyarsk Krai, a village in Stretensky Selsoviet of Nizhneingashsky District of Krasnoyarsk Krai
- Baykalovo, Perm Krai, a village under the administrative jurisdiction of the town of krai significance of Chusovoy in Perm Krai
- Baykalovo, Sverdlovsk Oblast, a selo in Baykalovsky District of Sverdlovsk Oblast
- Baykalovo, Tyumen Oblast, a selo in Baykalovsky Rural Okrug of Tobolsky District of Tyumen Oblast
