= Artyomovsky (inhabited locality) =

Artyomovsky (Russian: Артёмовский; masculine) or Artyomovskaya (Артёмовская; feminine) is the name of several inhabited localities in Russia.

Urban localities

- Artyomovsky, Irkutsk Oblast
- Artyomovsky, Sverdlovsk Oblast

Rural localities

- Artyomovskaya, Moscow Oblast
- Artyomovskaya, Kharovsky District, Vologda Oblast
- Artyomovskaya, Syamzhensky District, Vologda Oblast

Historical inhabited localities

- Artyomovsky, Primorsky Krai, a former urban-type settlement; now a part of the town of Artyom
