= Nosovo =

Nosovo (Russian: Но́сово) is the name of several rural localities in Russia:

- Nosovo, Kaluga Oblast, a village in Iznoskovsky District of Kaluga Oblast
- Nosovo, Kostroma Oblast, a village in Chukhlomskoye Settlement of Chukhlomsky District of Kostroma Oblast
- Nosovo, Leningrad Oblast, a village in Borskoye Settlement Municipal Formation of Boksitogorsky District of Leningrad Oblast
- Nosovo, Naro-Fominsky District, Moscow Oblast, a village in Veselevskoye Rural Settlement of Naro-Fominsky District of Moscow Oblast
- Nosovo, Solnechnogorsky District, Moscow Oblast, a village in Lunevskoye Rural Settlement of Solnechnogorsky District of Moscow Oblast
- Nosovo, Volokolamsky District, Moscow Oblast, a village in Teryayevskoye Rural Settlement of Volokolamsky District of Moscow Oblast
- Nosovo, Nizhny Novgorod Oblast, a village in Timiryazevsky Selsoviet of Gorodetsky District of Nizhny Novgorod Oblast
- Nosovo (Novousitovskaya Rural Settlement), Palkinsky District, Pskov Oblast, a village in Palkinsky District, Pskov Oblast; municipally, a part of Novousitovskaya Rural Settlement of that district
- Nosovo (Vasilyevskaya Rural Settlement), Palkinsky District, Pskov Oblast, a village in Palkinsky District, Pskov Oblast; municipally, a part of Vasilyevskaya Rural Settlement of that district
- Nosovo, Pushkinogorsky District, Pskov Oblast, a village in Pushkinogorsky District, Pskov Oblast
- Nosovo, Pytalovsky District, Pskov Oblast, a village in Pytalovsky District, Pskov Oblast
- Nosovo, Rostov Oblast, a selo in Nosovskoye Rural Settlement of Neklinovsky District of Rostov Oblast
- Nosovo, Sverdlovsk Oblast, a village in Taborinsky District of Sverdlovsk Oblast
- Nosovo, Republic of Tatarstan, a village in Rybno-Slobodsky District of the Republic of Tatarstan
- Nosovo, Kalininsky District, Tver Oblast, a village in Kalininsky District, Tver Oblast
- Nosovo, Kalyazinsky District, Tver Oblast, a village in Kalyazinsky District, Tver Oblast
- Nosovo, Krasnokholmsky District, Tver Oblast, a village in Krasnokholmsky District, Tver Oblast
- Nosovo, Toropetsky District, Tver Oblast, a village in Toropetsky District, Tver Oblast
- Nosovo, Zubtsovsky District, Tver Oblast, a village in Zubtsovsky District, Tver Oblast
- Nosovo, Yaroslavl Oblast, a village in Vasilyevsky Rural Okrug of Poshekhonsky District of Yaroslavl Oblast
