= Yury Matveyevich Bayakovsky =

Russian computer scientist

Yury Bayakovsky
- Юрий Баяковский
- Born: 5 November 1937; Lobva
- Died: 17 June 2014 (aged 76); Moscow
- Education: Moscow Power Engineering Institute
- Scientific career
- Fields: Computer graphics

Yury Matveyevich Bayakovsky (Russian: Юрий Матвеевич Баяковский; 5 November 1937 - 17 June 2014) was a Soviet and Russian scientist in the field of Computer graphics, Candidate of Sciences.

== Biography ==
He was born in 1928 in the Lobva.

In 1960 he graduated from the Moscow Power Engineering Institute, Faculty of Automation and Computer Engineering. After graduation I went to work at the Institute of Applied Mathematics of the USSR Academy of Sciences in the position of computer engineer "M-20".

He participated in the debugging of the machine "Spring" and preparing it for state tests.

In the late 1960s, under the guidance of Bayakovsky, the development of a graphic programs library on Fortran Grafor began.

In 1990 he was admitted to the "Computer Graphics Pioneers Club" ACM SIGGRAPH. In 1991 he first helped organize the international "Graphicon" conference - conducted jointly with the American group SIGGRAPH of the Association for Computing Machinery.

== Literature ==
- Bayakovsky Y., Pervitsky A. Fundamentals on computer graphics and multimedia // GraphiCon. — 1996.
- Bayakovsky Y. Computer Graphics Education Takes Off in the 1990s // Computer Graphics. — 1996. — Т. 30, № 3.
- Штаркман В.С., Баяковский Ю.М. Машинная графика. — Препринт ИПМ АН СССР. — Москва: ИПМ, 1970.
- Баяковский Ю.М., Галактионов В.А. Графические протоколы // Автометрия. — 1978. — № 5. — С. 3—12.
- Баяковский Ю.М., Галактионов В.А., Михайлова Т.Н. Графор. Графическое расширение фортрана. — Москва: Наука, 1985.
