= Zyryansky =

Zyryansky (masculine), Zyryanskaya (feminine), or Zyryanskoye (neuter) may refer to:

- Zyryansky District, a district of Tomsk Oblast, Russia
- Zyryansky (inhabited locality) (Zyryanskaya, Zyryanskoye), several rural localities in Russia

== See also ==
- Zyryanka
