= Cheremissky =

Cheremissky (Russian: Черемисский; masculine), Cheremisskaya (Черемисская; feminine), or Cheremisskoye (Черемисское; neuter) is the name of several rural localities in Russia.

== Modern localities ==
- Cheremissky (rural locality), a settlement in Bolsheyelninsky Selsoviet of Kstovsky District in Nizhny Novgorod Oblast
- Cheremisskoye, Kataysky District, Kurgan Oblast, a village in Ilyinsky Selsoviet of Kataysky District in Kurgan Oblast; 56°15′N 62°40′E
- Cheremisskoye, Shadrinsky District, Kurgan Oblast (or Cheremisskaya), a selo in Cheremissky Selsoviet of Shadrinsky District in Kurgan Oblast; 56°1′N 63°49′E
- Cheremisskoye, Nizhny Novgorod Oblast, a village in Bolsheyelninsky Selsoviet of Kstovsky District in Nizhny Novgorod Oblast
- Cheremisskoye, Sverdlovsk Oblast, a selo in Rezhevsky District of Sverdlovsk Oblast
- Cheremisskaya, Kirov Oblast, a village in Pokrovsky Rural Okrug of Kotelnichsky District in Kirov Oblast; 58°9′N 48°13′E
- Cheremisskaya, Sverdlovsk Oblast, a village in Kamensky District of Sverdlovsk Oblast

== Abolished localities ==
- Cheremisskoye, Kostroma Oblast, a village in Gorlovsky Selsoviet of Ponazyrevsky District of Kostroma Oblast; abolished on August 30, 2004
