= Beloyarsky =

Beloyarsky (masculine), Beloyarskaya (feminine), or Beloyarskoye (neuter) may refer to:

- Beloyarsky District, several districts in Russia
- Beloyarsky Urban Settlement, a municipal formation in Beloyarsky Municipal District which the town of okrug significance of Beloyarsky in Khanty-Mansi Autonomous Okrug, Russia is incorporated as
- Beloyarskoye Urban Settlement, a municipal formation which the work settlement of Bely Yar and the village of Poludenovka in Verkhneketsky District of Tomsk Oblast, Russia are incorporated as
- Beloyarsky (inhabited locality) (Beloyarskaya, Beloyarskoye), several inhabited localities in Russia
