= Turinsky =

Turinsky (masculine), Turinskaya (feminine), or Turinskoye (neuter) may refer to:

- Turinsky District, a district of Sverdlovsk Oblast, Russia
  - Turinsky Urban Okrug, the municipal formation which this district is incorporated as
- Turinsky (rural locality), a rural locality (a settlement) in Tyumen Oblast, Russia
