= Beloyarsky (inhabited locality) =

Beloyarsky (Russian: Белоя́рский; masculine), Beloyarskaya (Белоя́рская; feminine), or Beloyarskoye (Белоя́рское; neuter) is the name of several inhabited localities in Russia.

Urban localities

- Beloyarsky, Khanty-Mansi Autonomous Okrug, a town in Khanty-Mansi Autonomous Okrug; administratively incorporated as a town of okrug significance
- Beloyarsky, Sverdlovsk Oblast, a work settlement in Beloyarsky District of Sverdlovsk Oblast

Rural localities

- Beloyarsky, Saratov Oblast, a settlement in Novoburassky District of Saratov Oblast
- Beloyarskoye, a selo in Beloyarsky Selsoviet of Shchuchansky District of Kurgan Oblast
