= Korkinsky =

Korkinsky (masculine), Korkinskaya (feminine), or Korkinskoye (neuter) may refer to:

- Korkinsky District, a district of Chelyabinsk Oblast, Russia
- Korkinskoye Urban Settlement, a municipal formation which the Town of Korkino in Korkinsky District of Chelyabinsk Oblast, Russia is incorporated as
- Korkinskoye (rural locality), several rural localities in Russia
