= Beloyarsky District =

Location of Khanty–Mansi Autonomous Okrug – Yugra in Russia

Location of Sverdlovsk Oblast in Russia

Beloyarsky District is the name of several administrative and municipal districts in Russia.

- Beloyarsky District, Khanty-Mansi Autonomous Okrug, an administrative and municipal district of Khanty–Mansi Autonomous Okrug – Yugra
- Beloyarsky District, Sverdlovsk Oblast, an administrative district of Sverdlovsk Oblast

== See also ==
- Beloyarsky (disambiguation)
