= Maxim Ivanov (politician, born 1967) =

Russian politician (born 1967)

- Максим Иванов
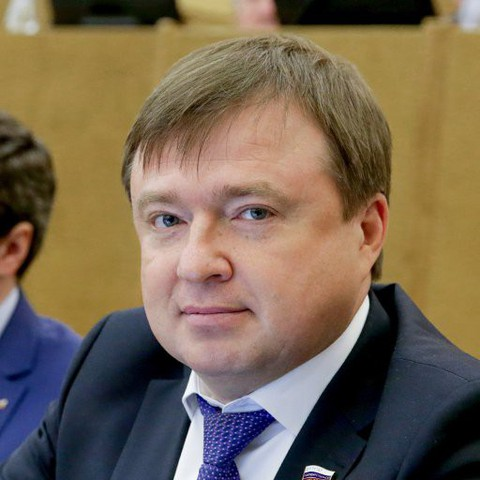

Member of the State Duma for Sverdlovsk Oblast
- Incumbent
- Assumed office 5 October 2016
- Preceded by: constituency re-established
- Constituency: Asbest (No. 172)

Personal details
- Born: 24 November 1967 (age 58) Sverdlovsk, RSFSR, USSR
- Party: United Russia
- Education: Novosibirsk Higher Military Command School

Maxim Anatolievich Ivanov (Russian: Максим Анатольевич Иванов; born 24 November 1967, Sverdlovsk) is a Russian political figure and a deputy of the 7th and 8th State Dumas.

From 1993 to 1995, he worked in the Federal Tax Police Service in Novosibirsk. He continued his career at the Department for Combating Economic Crimes. From 2004 to 2010, he served as an assistant to the deputy of the 5th State Duma Igor Barinov. On March 14, 2010, Ivanov was elected deputy of the Legislative Assembly of Sverdlovsk Oblast. In 2016, he became a deputy of the 7th State Duma from the Sverdlovsk Oblast constituency. Since September 2021, he has served as a deputy of the 8th State Duma.

== Legislative Activities ==
As a deputy of the Legislative Assembly of the Sverdlovsk Region in 2015, Maksim Ivanov worked on the draft law “On Regulating Certain Relations Related to the Participation of Citizens in Ensuring Public Safety in the Territory of the Sverdlovsk Region.” In 2016, he proposed banning individuals who had unlawfully evaded military service from being elected as deputies.

In April 2016, Ivanov prepared the draft law “On State Support for Gardeners, Vegetable Growers, Dacha Owners and Their Gardening, Vegetable Growing, and Dacha Non-Profit Associations in the Sverdlovsk Region,” which provided an opportunity for landowners in the Urals to receive subsidies. In October–November 2016, already serving as a State Duma deputy, Maksim Ivanov took an active part in developing the draft of the new law “On Gardening, Vegetable Growing, and Dacha Management,” which expanded state support measures for gardeners.

In March 2018, as a State Duma deputy, Maksim Ivanov proposed tightening control over migrants through the use of electronic tracking devices. In June of the same year, a special expert group was established in the State Duma to improve legislation in the field of migration and Russian citizenship, focusing on analyzing existing legal norms and developing proposals for their optimization. Maksim Ivanov became the group’s co-chair.

In March 2019, Maksim Ivanov proposed confiscating the vehicles of drivers who were caught drunk driving for the second time within a year, with the property transferred to the state.

From 2016 to 2021, during his tenure as a deputy of the State Duma of the 7th convocation, Maksim Ivanov co-authored 80 legislative initiatives and amendments to draft federal laws.In the twelfth edition of the “State Duma Deputies Usefulness Coefficient” (KPDGD) ranking of Russian parliamentary performance, published in 2021, Maksim Ivanov ranked 94th out of 444 deputies overall and 5th among deputies from the Sverdlovsk Region.

== Property and income ==
Maksim Ivanov declared an income of 5.216 million rubles for 2020, while his wife’s income amounted to 443,000 rubles. A year earlier, their incomes were 5.405 million rubles and 406,000 rubles, respectively.

Ivanov owns 1/22 of a non-residential property with an area of 654.4 m². His wife owns a garden plot of 1,700 m², an apartment of 121.5 m², and two cars: a Mercedes-Benz GL 350 and a Volkswagen Touareg.

== Sanctions ==
He was sanctioned by the UK government in 2022 in relation to the Russo-Ukrainian War.
