= Zhanna Ryabtseva =

Russian politician

Zhanna Ryabtseva MP
- Жанна Рябцева
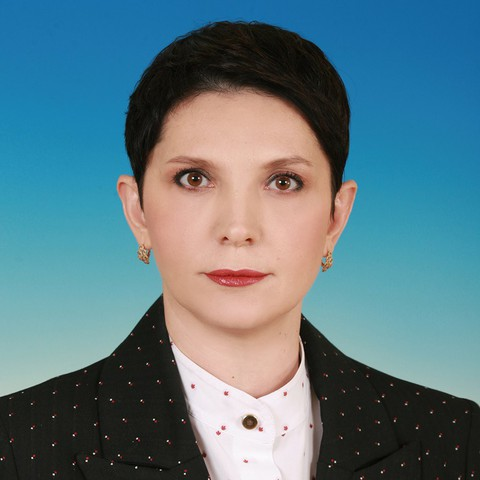

Member of the State Duma (Party List Seat)
- Incumbent
- Assumed office 12 October 2021

Personal details
- Born: 8 December 1977 (age 48) Verkhneye Dubrovo, Sverdlovsk Oblast, Russian SFSR, USSR
- Party: United Russia
- Education: Ural State Technical University; RANEPA

Zhanna Anatolievna Ryabtseva (Russian: Жанна Анатольевна Рябцева; December 8, 1977, Verkhneye Dubrovo, Sverdlovsk Oblast) is a Russian political figure and deputy of the 8th State Duma. From 2001 to 2014, she worked at the Pnevmostroymashina, first as an engineer and then as a CEO. In 2014, she became the head of the regional branch of the All-Russia People's Front in Sverdlovsk Oblast. She is a member of the Public Chamber of the Sverdlovsk Oblast. Since September 2021, she has served as deputy of the 8th State Duma.

== Sanctions ==
She is sanctioned by the United Kingdom from 11 March 2022 in relation to Russia's actions in Ukraine.

She is one of the Duma deputies that the United States Treasury sanctioned on 24 March 2022 in response to the 2022 Russian invasion of Ukraine.
