= Zyryansky (inhabited locality) =

Zyryansky (Russian: Зырянский; masculine), Zyryanskaya (Зырянская; feminine), or Zyryanskoye (Зырянское; neuter) is the name of several rural localities in Russia:

- Zyryansky (rural locality), a pochinok in Permassky Selsoviet of Nikolsky District of Vologda Oblast
- Zyryanskoye, Sakhalin Oblast, a selo in Kholmsky District of Sakhalin Oblast
- Zyryanskoye, Tomsk Oblast, a selo in Zyryansky District of Tomsk Oblast
- Zyryanskaya, a village in Baykalovsky District of Sverdlovsk Oblast
