= SUAL Group =

Siberian-Urals Aluminium Company
- Native name: Russian: Сибирско-Уральская Алюминиевая Компания
- Headquarters: Russia

Siberian-Urals Aluminium Company (Russian: Сибирско-Уральская Алюминиевая Компания), commonly known as SUAL (Russian: СУАЛ), is a fully vertically integrated aluminium company that ranks amongst the world's top ten aluminium producers. It comprises 19 businesses that are located in nine Russian regions and are involved in the production of bauxite, alumina, primary aluminium, silicon, semi-finished and finished aluminium products. The Group's revenue for the year ended December 31, 2003 was USD 1.7 billion. It has some 62,000 employees.

United Company RUSAL (Rusal) was founded in March 2007 through the merger of RUSAL, SUAL, and the alumina assets of Glencore. Kamensk-Uralsky Metallurgical Works which earlier belonged to the SUAL group was not merged to RUSAL and exists as an independent company. SUAL group uses the ventilation fan equipment produced at Ventprom.
