= Korkinskoye (rural locality) =

Korkinskoye (Russian: Коркинское) is the name of several rural localities in Russia:

- Korkinskoye, Sverdlovsk Oblast, a selo in Turinsky District of Sverdlovsk Oblast
- Korkinskoye, Vologda Oblast, a village in Kubinsky Selsoviet of Kharovsky District of Vologda Oblast
