= Ventprom =

- Native name: "ВЕНТПРОМ"
- Company type: Closed joint-stock company
- Industry: Machine building
- Founded: 1941
- Headquarters: Artyomovsky, Sverdlovsk Oblast, Russia
- Products: Ventilation fans, ductwork, control systems, refrigeration and heating equipment
- Website: en.ventprom.com#/main

Ventprom is a Russian machine building plant located in Artyomovsky, Sverdlovsk Oblast, Russia. The factory produces ventilation equipment, such as main mine ventilation fans, for a number of large mining companies, including Lukoil, SUAL Group and others. The full name of the company is Joint Stock Company Artyomovsky Machine Engineering Plant VENTPROM (АО «Артемовский машиностроительный завод «ВЕНТПРОМ»). It is a private company. The name ВЕНТПРОМ means "fan industry".

== History ==
The plant was originally built in 1941 in Skopin, Ryazan Oblast, and initially was manufacturing coal mining equipment. In 1941, during the German invasion, the factory was evacuated to Ural and opened its doors in Artyomovsky. Although three weeks after evacuation the plant started to produce ammunition for the Red Army, even during the war it was involved in non-military production, for instance, drilling rigs equipment. The plant won a number of state awards for best products.

After the war the Soviet government decided that the factory should remain in Artyomovsky. It was further expanded to produce underground mining equipment, mostly main mine ventilation fans. In the end of 50-s - beginning of 60-s the plant had its first serious renovation followed by technical upgrading with new shops, including machine assembly, mechanical, repairmen, and tool shop being open. The plant soon obtained its own engineering design department. A few years later the first and the only in USSR wind tunnel test station was implemented at the plant's premises. At that time the plant's main product range was expanded from main mine ventilation fans to ventilation equipment for subways and transport tunnels, pulp and paper industry, mining conveyors, locks and joints for drilling rigs, welding electrodes and dust collectors. In the following decade Ventprom developed a new range of axial flow fans for metro, PTO-16M, PTO-18 PTO-24 VOMD-2.4, which are currently used in subway ventilation systems in Russia and abroad. At the end of 80-s, prior to the collapse of USSR, Ventpom's annual fan production peaked at 1,200 pieces, boasting of export to over 30 countries. A new line of gas exhaust fans, local ventilation fans, new single-stage blowers for metros were developed at that time.

In the 2000s, Ventprom adopted a number of German engineering designs and produced a new line of standard size fans designed for the extraction of methane-air mixture from the mine workings. Implementing cutting plasma systems and Japanese welding robots, Ventprom is currently one of the most up-to-date factories in Russia.

== Operations ==
Ventprom supplies a wide range of ventilation products for underground ventilation, including variable and simple fixed pitch axial flow main ventilation fans, centrifugal and mixed flow ventilation fans with radial vanes, mixed flow ventilation fans, smaller fans for auxiliary and booster application, among others.
