= Slobodo-Turinsky District =

District in Sverdlovsk Oblast, Russia

Slobodo-Turinsky District Слободо-Туринский район (Russian)
- District
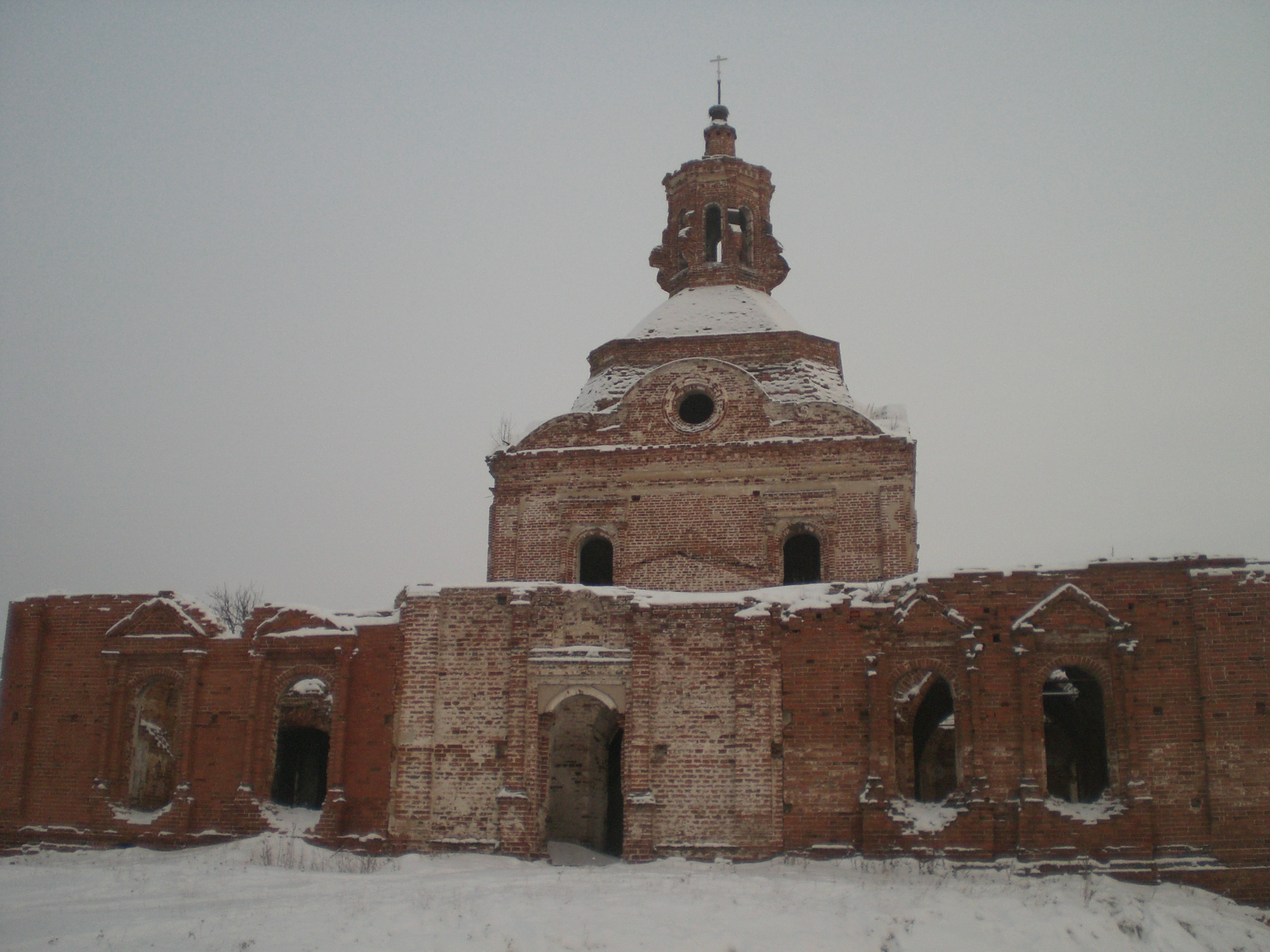

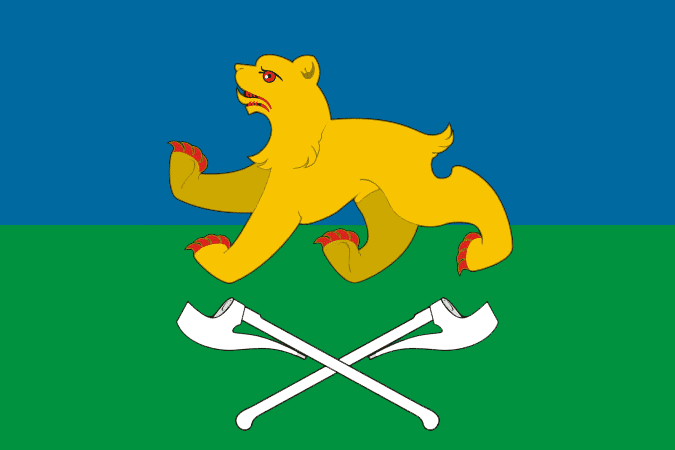
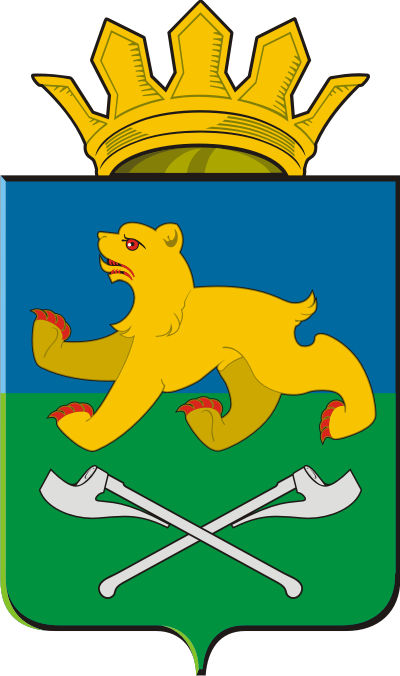
- Flag Coat of arms
- Location of Slobodo-Turinsky District in Sverdlovsk Oblast
- Coordinates: 57.604°N 63.870°E
- Country: Russia
- Federal subject: Sverdlovsk Oblast
- Administrative center: Turinskaya Sloboda

Area
  - Total: 2,709.1 km^{2} (1,046.0 sq mi)

Population (2010 Census)
  - Total: 15,091
  - Density: 5.5705/km^{2} (14.427/sq mi)
  - Urban: 0%
  - Rural: 100%

Administrative structure
  - Administrative divisions: 13 Selsoviets
  - Inhabited localities: 48 rural localities

Municipal structure
  - Municipally incorporated as: Slobodo-Turinsky Municipal District
  - Municipal divisions: 0 urban settlements, 4 rural settlements
- Time zone: UTC+5 (MSK+2)
- OKTMO ID: 65639000
- Website: http://www.slturmr.ru/

Slobodo-Turinsky District (Russian: Слободо-Туринский райо́н) is an administrative district (raion), one of the thirty in Sverdlovsk Oblast, Russia. As a municipal division, it is incorporated as Slobodo-Turinsky Municipal District. The area of the district is 2,709.1 square kilometers (1,046.0 sq mi). Its administrative center is the rural locality (a selo) of Turinskaya Sloboda. Population: 15,091 (2010 Census); 17,034 (2002 Census); 18,950 (1989 Soviet census). The population of Turinskaya Sloboda accounts for 35.5% of the district's total population.

On November 12, 1923, by the Decree of the All-Russian Central Executive Committee, the Slobodo-Turinsky District was formed as part of the Irbitsky District of the newly formed Ural Region of the RSFSR.

On January 17, 1934, after the division of the Ural region into three new ones, the district became part of the Sverdlovsk region.

On October 10, 1937, the villages of Vasilyevsky and Levochkinskoye of the Kirillovsky Village Council were transferred to the Velizhansky District of the Omsk Region.

On August 21, 1938, a network of village councils of the Slobodo-Turinsky district was approved: Ermakovskiy village council - the village of Ermakova (the center of the village council), Antropova, Zamotaeva, Zuev, Rechukha and high. Petrovsky, transferred from the Ust-Nitsinsky village council; Zhiryakovsky village council - village Zhiryakova (center of the village council), Larionova, Lukina, Cheremnova and high. Uval, transferred from the Timofeevsky village council; Korzhavinsky village council - the village of Khramtsova (the center of the village council), Davydkov and high. Gora, Karsachye and Luzhki, with the renaming of the village council to Khramtsovsky; Krasnoslobodskoy village council - with. Krasnoslobodskoye (the center of the village council), the village of Mizinka, the MTS estate and the village of Ivanovka, transferred from the Ivanovsky village council, the village of Repina from the Melnikovsky village council; Kruglovsky village council - pos. Vysokogorsky (center of the village council), pos. Danilova Griva, Kruglovsky, forester's house, pos. Sedunovskii and vys. Mikheevo, transferred from the Reshetnikovsky village council, with the renaming of the village council to Vysokovsky; Malinovsky village council - the village of Malinovka (the center of the village council) and Ishkulka, pos. Cheerful, Osinovsky, Pustynsky, Starikovsky and Tyagensky and transferred from the Slobodo-Turinsky village council high. Sunrise and Shaitanka; Melnikovsky village council - the village of Golyakova (the center of the village council), Melnikova and the village of Kartagulov and transferred from the Erzovsky village council and high. Katnitsa and from the Ust-Nitsinsky village council vys. Maltsevsky and Olkhovsky, with the renaming of the village council to Golyakovsky; Reshetnikovsky village council - the village of Reshetnikova (the center of the village council), Gorodishche, Plyasunova and the village. Makarov; Slobodo-Turinsky village council - with. Turinskaya Sloboda (center of the village council) and high. Zakharovka, Obrosovka, Razdolie and Ryabinovka; Timofeevsky village council - with. Timofeevskoe (the center of the village council), the village of Lugovaya and Furtikova, vys. Borok and Lukina and transferred from the Erzovsky village council of the village of Nekhoroshkova; Ust-Nitsinsky Village Council - with. Ust-Nitsinskoye and the village of Erzovka transferred from the Erzovsky village council; Nitsinsky village council - farm number 2 of the Nitsinsky state farm (center of the village council), vys. Aleksandrovskiy, Bikreva, Danshino, Dryanovka, Krasny Luch, Mitrofanovka, Petrovsky and pos. The central estate of the Nitsinsky state farm, farm No. 3 of the Nitsinsky state farm, farm No. 2 of the Nitsinsky state farm, transferred from the Ivanovsky village council, height. Ivanovsky, transferred from the Korzhavinsky village council, and high. Arkhangelovo from the Slobodo-Turinsky village council. The village councils of Andronovsky, Kuminovsky, Makuevsky, Pushkarevsky, Sladkovsky, Tazovsky and Falinsky remained in the old composition. The village councils of Erzovsky and Ivanovsky were disbanded.

On August 6, 1940, the settlement of Petrovsky was transferred from the Yermakovsky village council of the Slobodo-Turinsky district to the Zubkovsky village council of the Tugulymsky district.

On March 27, 1941, the settlement of Sagay was transferred from the Velizhansky district of the Omsk region to the Reshetnikovsky village council of the Slobodo-Turinsky district.

On April 16, the Tazovsky village council was transferred from the Slobodo-Turinsky district to Turinsky.

On November 13, 1942, the village of Ovchinnikova was transferred from the Shadrinsky village council of the Tugulymsky district to the Reshetnikovsky village council of the Slobodo-Turinsky district. Shadrinsky village council was liquidated.

On December 11, 1950, the settlements were listed: Repino - from the Krasnoslobodsky village council to the Golyakovsky village council; Krasny Yar, Markova and Zaimka - from the Falinsky village council to the Timofeevsky village council.

July 6, 1951 high. Kruglovo was transferred from the Vysokovsky village council to Reshetnikovsky.

On June 5, 1952, the Falinsky Village Council was merged with Slobodo-Turinsky.

On June 18, 1954, the village of Shaitanka was transferred from the Malinovsky village council to Slobodo-Turinsky, the Andronovsky village council was merged with Khramtsovsky, Ermakovsky - with Golyakovsky.

On June 15, 1956, the village of Razdolie was transferred from the Lipovsky Village Council of the Turinsky District to the Kuminovsky Village Council of the Slobodo-Turinsky District.

On May 17, 1957, the settlements of Kartashev, Timin and Yurta were transferred from the Nizhneilensky village council of the Yelansky district to the Nitsinsky village council of the Slobodo-Turinsky district.

On May 29, 1958 Zhiryakovskiy village council was merged with Ust-Nitsinskiy, Vysokovskiy with Reshetnikovskiy.

On July 24, 1959, the Makuevsky village council was merged with Sladkovsky, and the villages of Andronova, Novaya, Kulikova from the Khramtsovsky village council were also included in the Sladkovsky council.

November 25, 1960 on the territory of the Nitsinsky village council were registered with. Nitsinskoye, Klyuchi village, pos. Star; on the territory of the Krasnoslobodsky village council - pos. Dawn.

On May 26, 1961, the Bobrovsky Village Council was transferred from the Baikalovsky District to Slobodo-Turinsky.

On February 1, 1963, the Slobodo-Turinsky district was abolished, Bobrovsky, Golyakovsky, Krasnoslobodsky, Kuminovsky, Malinovsky, Nitsinsky, Pushka
