= Reftinsky =

Work settlement in Sverdlovsk Oblast, Russia

Reftinsky Рефтинский
- Work settlement
- Flag Coat of arms
- Interactive map of Reftinsky
- Location of Reftinsky Reftinsky (Sverdlovsk Oblast)
- Coordinates: 57°05′21″N 61°40′45″E
- Country: Russia
- Federal subject: Sverdlovsk Oblast
- Founded: 1966

Population (2010 Census)
  - Total: 16,496
  - Estimate (2025): 15,115 (−8.4%)

Administrative status
  - Subordinated to: Town of Asbest

Municipal status
  - Urban okrug: Reftinsky Urban Okrug
  - Capital of: Reftinsky Urban Okrug
- Time zone: UTC+5 (MSK+2)
- Postal code: 624285
- OKTMO ID: 65763000051
- Website: goreftinsky.ru

Reftinsky (Russian: Рефтинский) is an urban locality (a work settlement) under the administrative jurisdiction of the Town of Asbest in Sverdlovsk Oblast, Russia. Population: 16,496 (2010 census); 17,968 (2002 census); 17,134 (1989 Soviet census).

== Administrative and municipal status ==
Within the framework of the administrative divisions, the work settlements of Reftinsky and Malysheva, together with five rural localities, are subordinated to the Town of Asbest—an administrative unit with the status equal to that of the districts. As a municipal division, the work settlement of Reftinsky is incorporated separately as Reftinsky Urban Okrug. The work settlement of Malysheva, together with three rural localities under the administrative jurisdiction of the Town of Asbest, is incorporated separately as Malyshevsky Urban Okrug, and the town of Asbest, together with two other rural localities, is incorporated separately as Asbestovsky Urban Okrug.
