= Beloyarsk, Yamalo-Nenets Autonomous Okrug =

Beloyarsk Белоярск
- Village
- Location within Yamalo-Nenets Autonomous Okrug Location within Russia
- Coordinates: 66°52′7″N 68°9′11″E
- Country: Russia
- Republic: Yamalo-Nenets Autonomous Okrug
- District: Priuralsky

Area
  - Total: 0.464 km^{2} (0.179 sq mi)
- Elevation: 23 m (75 ft)

Population (2021)
  - Total: 2,178
  - Density: 4,690/km^{2} (12,200/sq mi)
- Time zone: UTC+5 (YEKT)
- Postal code: 629636
- Area code: 34993

Beloyarsk (Russian: Белоярск) is a Nenets ethnic village, and the second largest village by population in Priuralsky District, Yamalo-Nenets Autonomous Okrug, Russia.

== History ==
=== Farming history ===
The settlement was founded in 1951, starting with the implementation of a Soviet collective farm named after Joseph Stalin, and was given its own village council in 1953. After founding, although the collective farm was the main source of employment and economic activity in the village at the time, residents started to diversify trade to include fishing and hunting reindeer for both meat and fur. Ten years later in 1961, the farm was expanded and merged with another nearby farm down the river into the larger Baidaratsky state farm, whose finances were run by Babin Nikolay Andreevich from 1958 to 1993.

All state farms in Beloyarsk except one were eventually closed by 1997 and privatized. The only remaining state farm (now partially privatized) is a large reindeer breeding farm, managed by Kuzyukov Alexander Vladimirovich since 2024. In 2024, The state farm reportedly employed 115 people and generated 144 million rubles of revenue ($1.75 million), as well as a net loss of 1.2 million rubles ($14,500) and owned 45 million rubles ($550,000) of fixed assets. Its customers include both of the Beloyarsk schools as well as institutions in the nearby village Aksarka. The farm has also undergone 46 arbitration cases worth 1.2 billion rubles ($14.5 million) in total collectively since its establishment, as well as 45 lawsuits.

=== Religion ===
Since the dissolution of the Soviet Union in 1991, and the re-emergence of Russian religion after nearly a century of secularism, there has been competition of religious factions among the Nenets people. As of 2018, many Beloyarsk residents are reported to have taken anti-sectarian, religiously conservative views - resistant to missionaries from other sects of the larger Russian Orthodox Church, with one of the protestant ministers from the village, Tatiana Vagramenko, quoting in a 2018 speech (translated to English):

Nowadays there are many missions that want to come here, but we don’t let them [come here]. Because they do only harm. I am sure there exist destructive sects. Never mind that they want to evangelize and so on, we don’t let them come here, don’t cooperate with them, and sometimes even prevent them from their activity. I would rather complain against them to the local administration than let them go to the tundra.

=== Government activity ===
- In 2015, a hospital was built in the village taking up 2500 square meters of land, featuring a polyclinic, outpatient clinic, 16-bed hospital with modern two-patient wards, maternity ward, physiotherapy department, tuberculosis unit, diagnostic facilities including an X-ray room and laboratories, and specialty offices for pediatricians, surgeons, dentists, gynecologists, therapists, and physiotherapists, with capacity to serve 50 patients per shift.
- Beloyarsk's own rural settlement district Beloyarskoye was established in 2005, although this district was abolished 16 years later in 2021. The same year, Beloyarsk established its own local (territorial/village-level) administration. This administration was run by Ryazanov Andrey Georgievich from 2023 to 2025, but his position was succeeded by Marina Anatolyevna Vityazyeva in 2025. It manages public finances, pensions and social services. The government building takes up 123 square meters of land.
- In 2018, Valery Stepanchenko, Chairman of the regional "A JUST RUSSIA" party branch and Yamal Legislative Assembly deputy, made a working visit to Beloyarsk, inspected local social infrastructure including a water treatment plant, solid waste disposal site, and the under-construction village Temple which he personally supervises. Stepanchenko emphasized the importance of such local visits for addressing community needs, with particular focus on youth education and local utilities and environmental concerns. He also noted that the maintenance of a recently built winter road to Aksarka was being kept in satisfactory condition despite challenging weather.
- In 2025, a post office was built in Beloyarsk.
- As of 2025, the village has its own fire department run by the Ministry of Emergency Situation (EMERCOM, which also has its own general purpose office in the village).

=== Veterinary study ===
In 2021, a veterinary study was done on eight to 11 deer around Beloyarsk village as to how concentrated dioxins, cadmium and mercury were in their internal organs (kidney, liver, muscles). Relative to other regions in Northern Russia, Beloyarsk deer had, overall, moderate levels of dioxins, cadmium and mercury per kilogram of fat in all three organs studied.

== Population ==
Beloyarsk's population has increased since 1989 when it was 1,539, to 1,859 in 2010. The net population fell by two people over the following decade; in 2020, Beloyarsk had a total population of 1,848 people:

- 750 of which had native Nenets ethnicity.
- 490 of which showed proficiency in Nenets languages.
- 433 of which indicated Nenets as their native language instead of Russian.

The Beloyarsk population then grew rapidly to 2,178 in 2021.

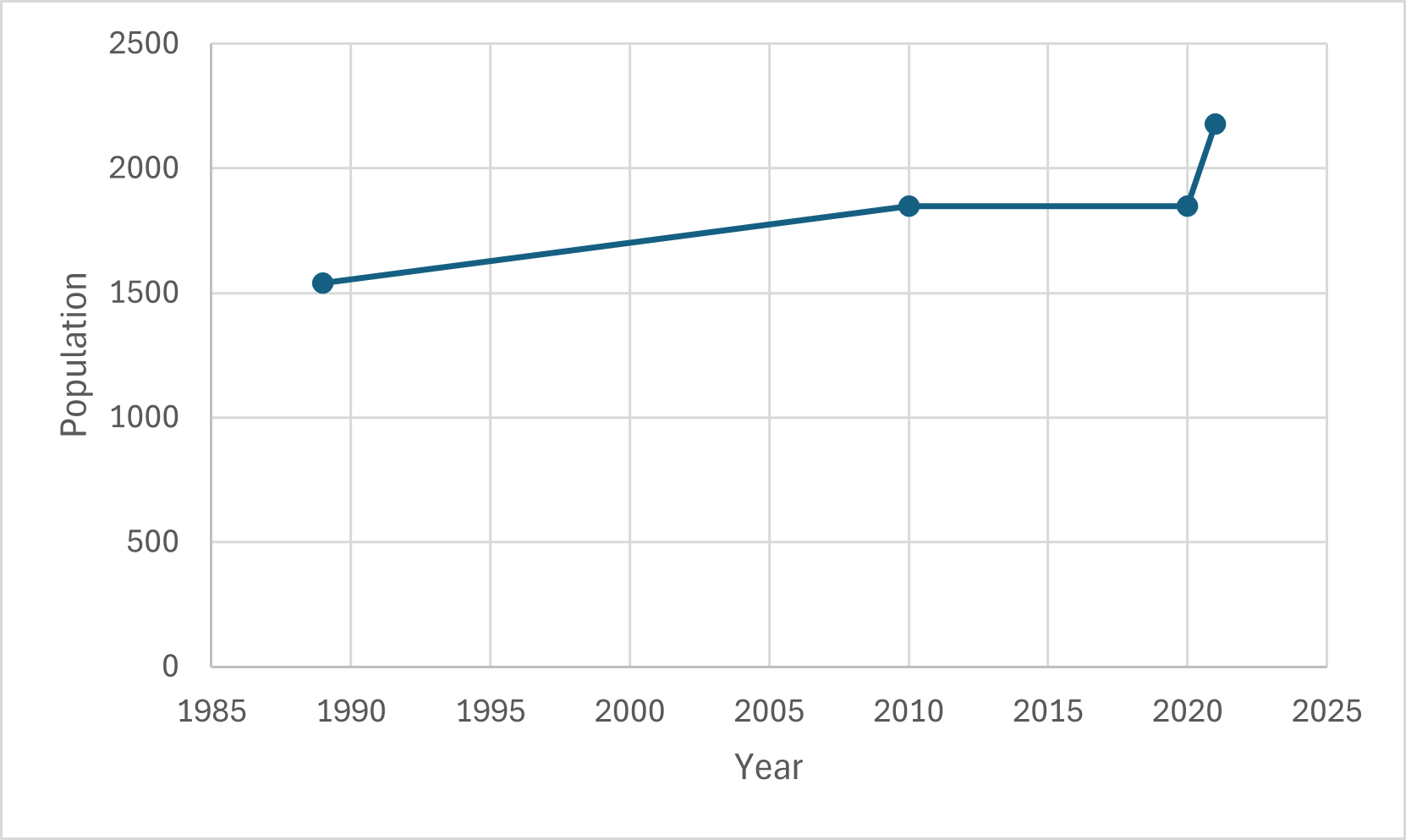
Population graph of Beloyarsk

== Education ==
=== Primary education ===
Beloyarsk has a primary school "Brusnichka School" that was founded in 2012. The kindergarten building takes up 2500 square metres and two stories, compared to the 12000 square meter land area if the school field and sports areas are included, featuring six group rooms, medical facilities with isolation rooms, a cafeteria with modern equipment, laundry facilities, art studios, choreography rooms, specialized spaces for speech therapy, psychology, and native language instruction, computer labs, a winter garden, comprehensive security systems including accessibility features for children with limited mobility, and capacity for 120 children primarily from indigenous northern families aged 2–7 years.

=== Secondary education ===
As of 2022, the only secondary school in Beloyarsk is Beloyarsk Boarding School, founded in 1998, with 616 students total; 280 of which are boarders. The boarding school has been headed by Korosteleva Olga Vladimirovna since 2018. The United Nations non-governmental organization (NGO) International Decade of Indigenous Languages visited the school in 2022 as part of an ethnographic project to help the school set up a course where students could specialize in learning the native languages of the Northern Russian people, such as Tundra Nenets, Northern Khanty and Komi. Together, the teachers (including some who travelled from Aksarka to partake in the project) and the NGO workers used fictional stories, projects, indigenous doll-making sessions and competitions to educate the students to this end, while informing the students about the work of International Decade of Indigenous Languages itself.

Later the same year, 422 students from the secondary school participated in an ophthalmology study.
