= Averino, Sverdlovsk Oblast =

Averino Аверино
- Village
- Location within Sverdlovsk Oblast Location within Russia
- Coordinates: 56°19′N 61°02′E
- Country: Russia
- Region: Sverdlovsk Oblast
- District: Sysertsky District
- Time zone: UTC+3:00

Averino (Russian: Аверино) is a rural locality (a selo) in Sysertsky District, Sverdlovsk Oblast, Russia. The population was 448 as of 2010. There are 12 streets.

== Geography ==
Averino is located 28 km southeast of Sysert (the district's administrative centre) by road. Kolyasnikovo is the nearest rural locality.

== Ethnicity ==
The village is inhabited by Russians.
