= Tabory, Taborinsky District, Sverdlovsk Oblast =

Rural locality in Sverdlovsk Oblast, Russia

Coordinates: 58°31′18″N 64°32′59″E

Tabory (Russian: Таборы) is a rural locality (a selo) and the administrative center of Taborinsky District, Sverdlovsk Oblast, Russia. Population: 1,885 (2010 census); 2,096 (2002 census); 2,107 (1989 Soviet census).
