= Rezh =

Town in Sverdlovsk Oblast, Russia

Rezh Реж
- Town
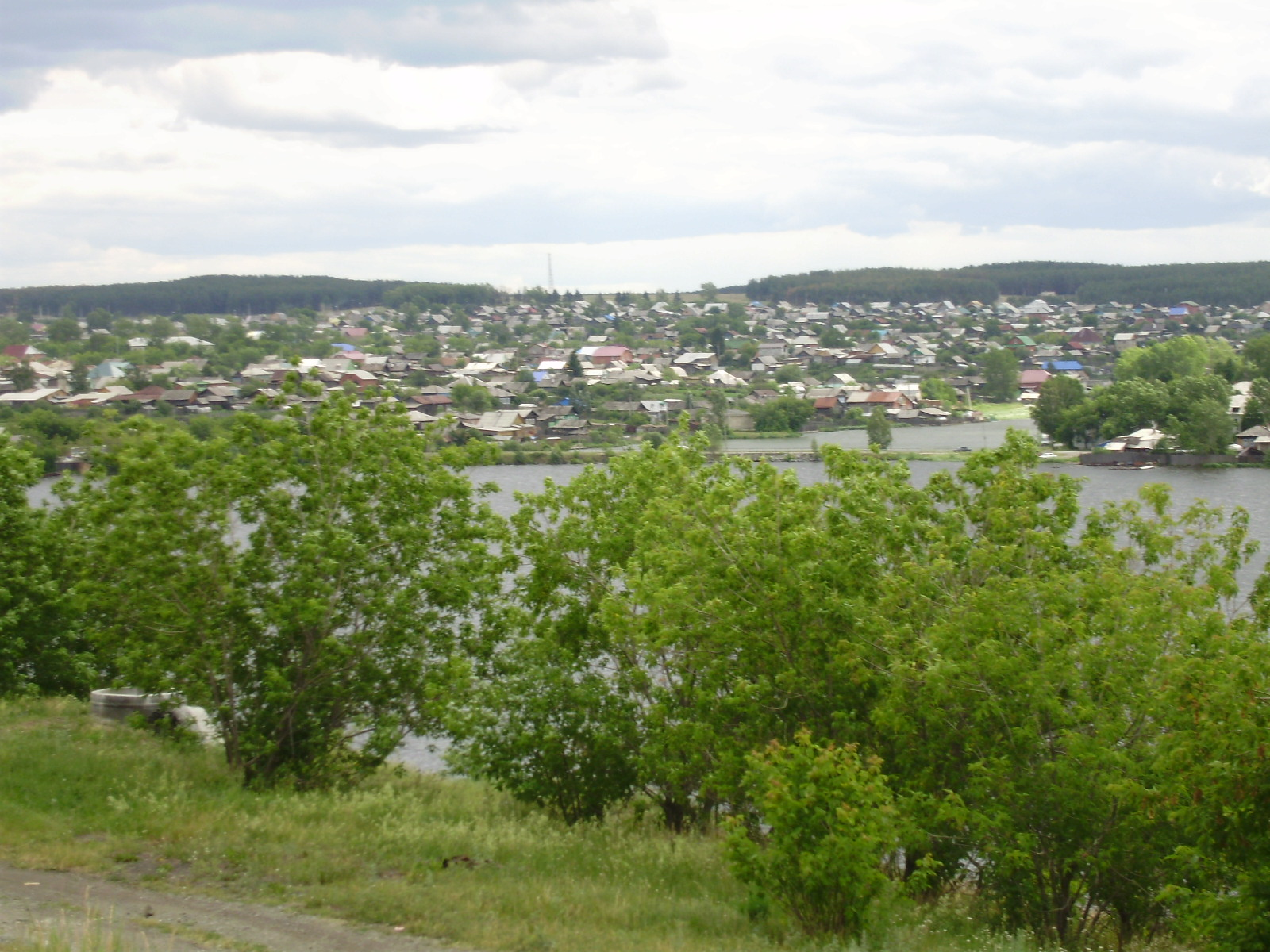
- View of Rezh

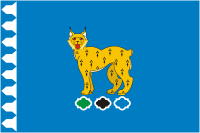
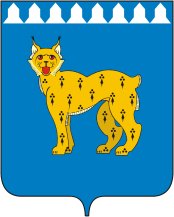
- Flag Coat of arms
- Interactive map of Rezh
- Location of Rezh Rezh (Sverdlovsk Oblast)
- Coordinates: 57°22′N 61°22′E
- Country: Russia
- Federal subject: Sverdlovsk Oblast
- Administrative district: Rezhevsky District
- TownSelsoviet: Rezh
- Founded: 1773
- Town status since: 1943
- Elevation: 190 m (620 ft)

Population (2010 Census)
  - Total: 38,215
  - Estimate (2025): 36,094 (−5.6%)

Administrative status
  - Capital of: Rezhevsky District, town of Rezh

Municipal status
  - Urban okrug: Rezhevskoy Urban Okrug
  - Capital of: Rezhevskoy Urban Okrug
- Time zone: UTC+5 (MSK+2)
- Postal codes: 623750–623753, 623759
- OKTMO ID: 65720000001
- Website: rezhevskoy.midural.ru

Rezh population
- 2010 Census: 38,215
- 2002 Census: 39,881
- 1989 Census: 43,429
- 1979 Census: 37,905

Rezh (Russian: Реж) is a town and the administrative center of Rezhevsky District in Sverdlovsk Oblast, Russia, located on the river Rezh (Ob's basin), 83 kilometers (52 mi) northeast of Yekaterinburg, the administrative center of the oblast. As of the 2010 Census, its population was 38,215.

== History ==
It was founded in 1773 as a settlement around a metal works factory. Town status was granted to it in 1943.

== Administrative and municipal status ==
Within the framework of administrative divisions, Rezh serves as the administrative center of Rezhevsky District. As an administrative division, it is incorporated within Rezhevsky District as the Town of Rezh. As a municipal division, the town of Rezh is, together with all thirty rural localities in Rezhevsky District, incorporated as Rezhevskoy Urban Okrug.
