= Baybulda =

Baybulda Байбулда
- village
- Location of Baybulda
- Location of Baybulda Baybulda (Sverdlovsk Oblast)
- Coordinates: 56°09′38″N 58°25′28″E
- Country: Russia
- Federal subject: Sverdlovsk Oblast
- Administrative district: Artinsky District
- Founded: 1740

Population (2010 Census)
  - Total: 153
- Time zone: UTC+5 (MSK+2)
- Postal code(s): 623369
- Dialing code(s): +7 34391
- OKTMO ID: 65704000126

Baybulda is a village in Sverdlovsk region located 30 km South-West from urban settlement Artie. It is a part of Malokarsinsk village council. Malokarsinsk rural council is located in the South-West of the Sverdlovsk region and Artinsk district. It borders with Bashkortostan, the length of borders is 33 kilometers, from the West – with the Sverdlovsk rural council, from the North – with Zlatoust rural administration. The distance to the district center Artie is 40 km.

== History ==
Some time ago the territory belonged to Bashkiria and then to Okinsk and Novozlatoustovsk districts. In 1869 the population of the village was 172 people. Baybulda was the oldest village of Artinsk region. It was named after the first settler – Paygelde (Paybolde) – Baybulda. The village was founded in 1740 by the people of Mari. Up to 1820, the aboriginal inhabitants were Bashkirians and people of Mari. The construction of a plant for the production of agricultural equipment in Artinsk begins in the 1780s.

== Population and social structure ==
On 01.01.2016, the village's population is 153 people. The number of yards is 69. Categories of population are:

1. Working-age population 83 people;
2. Retired 41 people;
3. Pupils 14 people.
4. Children of preschool age 15 people.

The male working population is engaged in private part-time farming, or rotation-based work Khanty-Mansi and Yamalo-Nenets Autonomous districts and in Yekaterinburg. The female working population is engaged into private part-time farming, or works in social institutions, which are located in the neighboring villages. School-age children have studies at Asigulovo secondary schools. Transportation of children to school is by bus daily. There is 1 shop in the village. Mobile aid station visits the village every day.

== Attractions ==
There are nine natural monuments on the territory of Artinsk urban; each of them has its unique importance and its unique beauty.

1. Mountain Kashkabash (Romanov Uval) — a geological monument of nature of Federal significance, located two kilometers away from the village Kurki, on the right Bank of the river Ufa.
2. Sabarsk landscape nature reserve — a reserved area of dark hardwood broad-leafed forests.
3. Stone mould — a geomorphological nature monument, located on the right Bank of the river Ufa. It has an original deposition of rock conglomerates and sandstones.
4. Berezovskaya dubrava — a botanical nature monument located near Berezovka village. It is an end point of the oak growth in Russia.
5. Potashkinskaya dubrava — a botanical nature monument located near Potashka village. It is an end point of the oak growth in Russia.
6. The area of growingstock — a botanical nature monument, located near Azhigulova village, in the floodplain of Ufa.
7. Mountain feather-grass heath — a botanical nature monument located near Upper and Lower Bardym village.
8. The area of mountain feather grass heaths — a botanical nature monument, located near Novyy Zlatoust village.
9. The area of ginseng cultural planting – a botanical monument of nature, located in Komarovo village.
