= Beloyarsky, Sverdlovsk Oblast =

Work settlement in Sverdlovsk Oblast, Russia

Beloyarsky Белоярский
- Work settlement
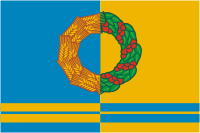
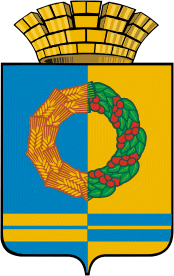
- Flag Coat of arms
- Interactive map of Beloyarsky
- Location of Beloyarsky Beloyarsky (Sverdlovsk Oblast)
- Coordinates: 56°45′32″N 61°22′57″E
- Country: Russia
- Federal subject: Sverdlovsk Oblast
- Administrative district: Beloyarsky District
- Founded: 1687
- Urban-type settlement status since: 1959

Government
  - Head: Alexander Privalov
- Elevation: 196 m (643 ft)

Population (2010 Census)
  - Total: 12,615
  - Estimate (2025): 13,124 (+4%)

Municipal status
  - Urban okrug: Beloyarsky Urban Okrug
  - Capital of: Beloyarsky Urban Okrug
- Time zone: UTC+5 (MSK+2)
- Postal code: 623710
- OKTMO ID: 65706000051
- Website: www.beloyarka.com

Beloyarsky (Russian: Белоя́рский) is an urban locality (a work settlement) in Beloyarsky of Sverdlovsk Oblast, Russia. Population: 12,615 (2010 census); 12,645 (2002 census); 13,711 (1989 Soviet census).

== History ==
Work settlement status was granted to it in 1959.

== Administrative and municipal status ==
Within the framework of administrative divisions, Beloyarsky is subordinated to Beloyarsky District. As a municipal division, the work settlement of Beloyarsky together with forty-four rural localities in Beloyarsky District is incorporated as Beloyarsky Urban Okrug.
