= Tavdinsky District =

District in Sverdlovsk Oblast, Russia

Tavdinsky District Тавдинский район
- District
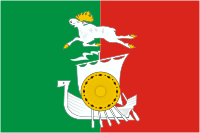
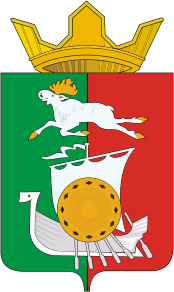
- Flag Coat of arms
- Location of Tavdinsky District in Sverdlovsk Oblast
- Coordinates: 58°03′N 65°16′E
- Country: Russia
- Federal subject: Sverdlovsk Oblast
- Administrative center: Tavda

Area
  - Total: 6,560 km^{2} (2,530 sq mi)

Population (2010 Census)
  - Total: 6,885
  - Density: 1.05/km^{2} (2.72/sq mi)
  - Urban: 0%
  - Rural: 100%

Administrative structure
  - Inhabited localities: 1 cities/towns, 43 rural localities

Municipal structure
  - Municipally incorporated as: Tavdinsky Urban Okrug
- Website: http://www.adm-tavda.ru/

Tavdinsky District (Russian: Тавдинский райо́н) is an administrative district (raion), one of the thirty in Sverdlovsk Oblast, Russia. As a municipal division, it is incorporated as Tavdinsky Urban Okrug. The area of the district is 6,560 square kilometers (2,530 sq mi). Its administrative center is the town of Tavda. Population (excluding the administrative center): 6,885 (2010 Census); 9,592 (2002 Census); 11,392 (1989 Soviet census).
