= Tavda =

Town in Sverdlovsk Oblast, Russia

Tavda Тавда
- Town
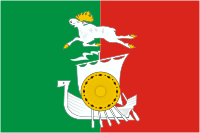
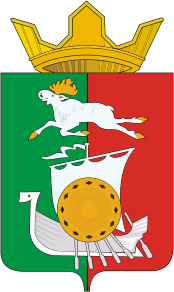
- Flag Coat of arms
- Interactive map of Tavda
- Location of Tavda Tavda (Sverdlovsk Oblast)
- Coordinates: 58°03′N 65°16′E
- Country: Russia
- Federal subject: Sverdlovsk Oblast
- Founded: 1916
- Town status since: 1937

Government
  - Mayor: Valentin Mironov

Area
  - Total: 148 km^{2} (57 sq mi)
- Elevation: 70 m (230 ft)

Population (2010 Census)
  - Total: 35,421
  - Estimate (2025): 31,773 (−10.3%)
  - Density: 239/km^{2} (620/sq mi)

Administrative status
  - Subordinated to: Tavdinsky District

Municipal status
  - Urban okrug: Tavdinsky Urban Okrug
  - Capital of: Tavdinsky Urban Okrug
- Time zone: UTC+5 (MSK+2)
- Postal codes: 623950, 623959
- Dialing code: +7 34360
- OKTMO ID: 65723000001
- Website: www.adm-tavda.ru

Tavda (Russian: Тавда́) is a town in Sverdlovsk Oblast, Russia, located on the river Tavda and functioning as a river port. Population: 35,421 (2010 census); 40,686 (2002 census); 45,735 (1989 Soviet census).
