= Turinskaya Sloboda =

Rural locality in Sverdlovsk Oblast, Russia

Coordinates: 57°36′59″N 64°23′22″E

Turinskaya Sloboda (Russian: Туринская Слобода) is a rural locality (a selo) and the administrative center of Slobodo-Turinsky District, Sverdlovsk Oblast, Russia. Population: 5,955 (2010 census); 6,123 (2002 census); 5,958 (1989 Soviet census).
