= Baranchinsky =

Rural locality in Kushvinsky district, Sverdlovsk Oblast, Russia

Coordinates: 58.10°N 59.42°E

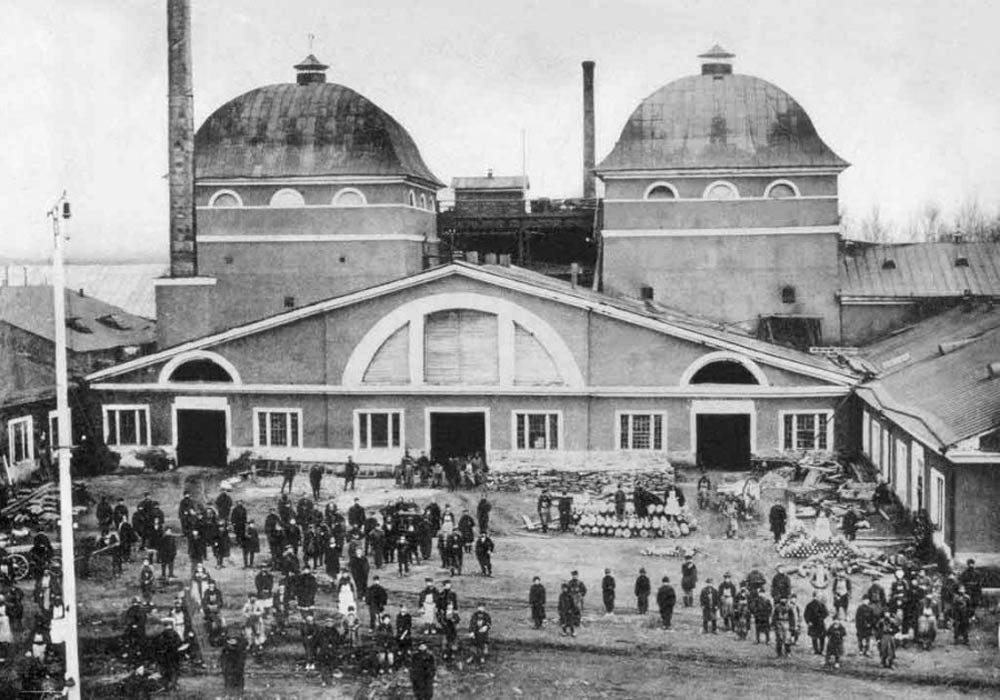
Blast furnace building of the Baranchinsky Plant

Baranchinsky (Russian: Баранчинский) is a settlement under the administrative jurisdiction of the town of oblast significance of Kushva in Sverdlovsk Oblast of Russia, located 15 km south of the town of Kushva and 30 km northwest of the town of Nizhny Tagil. The settlement straddles the Barancha river, a tributary of the Tagil. Baranchinsky's population in 2010 was 9461, down from a steady level of over 13000 seen in the Soviet times.

Baranchinsky was founded in 1743 as an industrial settlement along with the establishment of an ironworks in what then was the Perm Governorate. The factory was launched in 1747 under the name of Nizhne-Baranchinsky Plant, and used the rich magnetite deposits of the nearby Blagodat mountain.
