= Urban okrug =

Urban okrug may refer to:

- a type of municipal divisions of Russia
- a type of administrative divisions of Russia
