= Artyomovsky District =

District in Sverdlovsk Oblast, Russia

Artyomovsky District Артёмовский район
- District
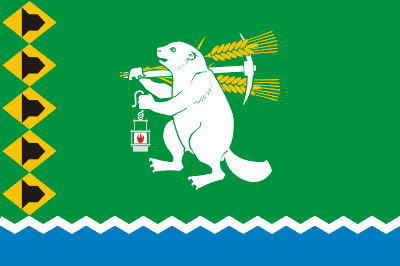
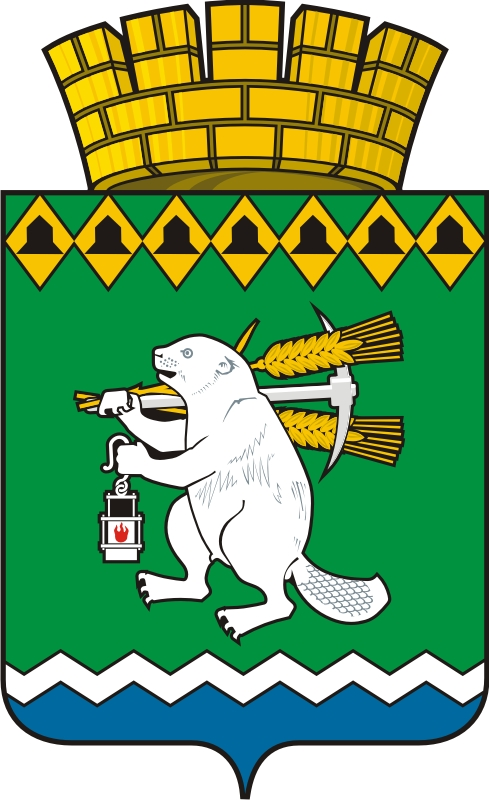
- Flag Coat of arms
- Location of Artyomovsky District in Sverdlovsk Oblast
- Coordinates: 57.341°N 61.887°E
- Country: Russia
- Federal subject: Sverdlovsk Oblast
- Established: 1996
- Administrative center: Artyomovsky

Area
  - Total: 2,027.4 km^{2} (782.8 sq mi)

Population (2010 Census)
  - Total: 27,017
  - Density: 13.326/km^{2} (34.514/sq mi)
  - Urban: 0%
  - Rural: 100%

Administrative structure
  - Administrative divisions: 1 Towns, 8 Selsoviets
  - Inhabited localities: 1 cities/towns, 33 rural localities

Municipal structure
  - Municipally incorporated as: Artyomovsky Urban Okrug
- Time zone: UTC+5 (MSK+2)
- OKTMO ID: 65703000
- Website: http://artemovsky66.ru/

Artyomovsky District (Russian: Артёмовский райо́н) is an administrative district (raion), one of the thirty in Sverdlovsk Oblast, Russia. As a municipal division, it is incorporated as Artyomovsky Urban Okrug. Its administrative center is the town of Artyomovsky. Population (excluding the administrative center): 27,017 (2010 Census); 28,168 (2002 Census); 33,929 (1989 Soviet census).
