= Baykalovo, Sverdlovsk Oblast =

Rural locality in Sverdlovsk Oblast, Russia

Coordinates: 57°23′56″N 63°45′58″E

Baykalovo (Russian: Байка́лово) is a rural locality (a selo) and the administrative center of Baykalovsky District, Sverdlovsk Oblast, Russia. Population: 5,789 (2010 census); 6,144 (2002 census); 6,758 (1989 Soviet census).
