= Malysheva, Sverdlovsk Oblast =

Work settlement in Sverdlovsk Oblast, Russia

Malysheva Малышева
- Work settlement
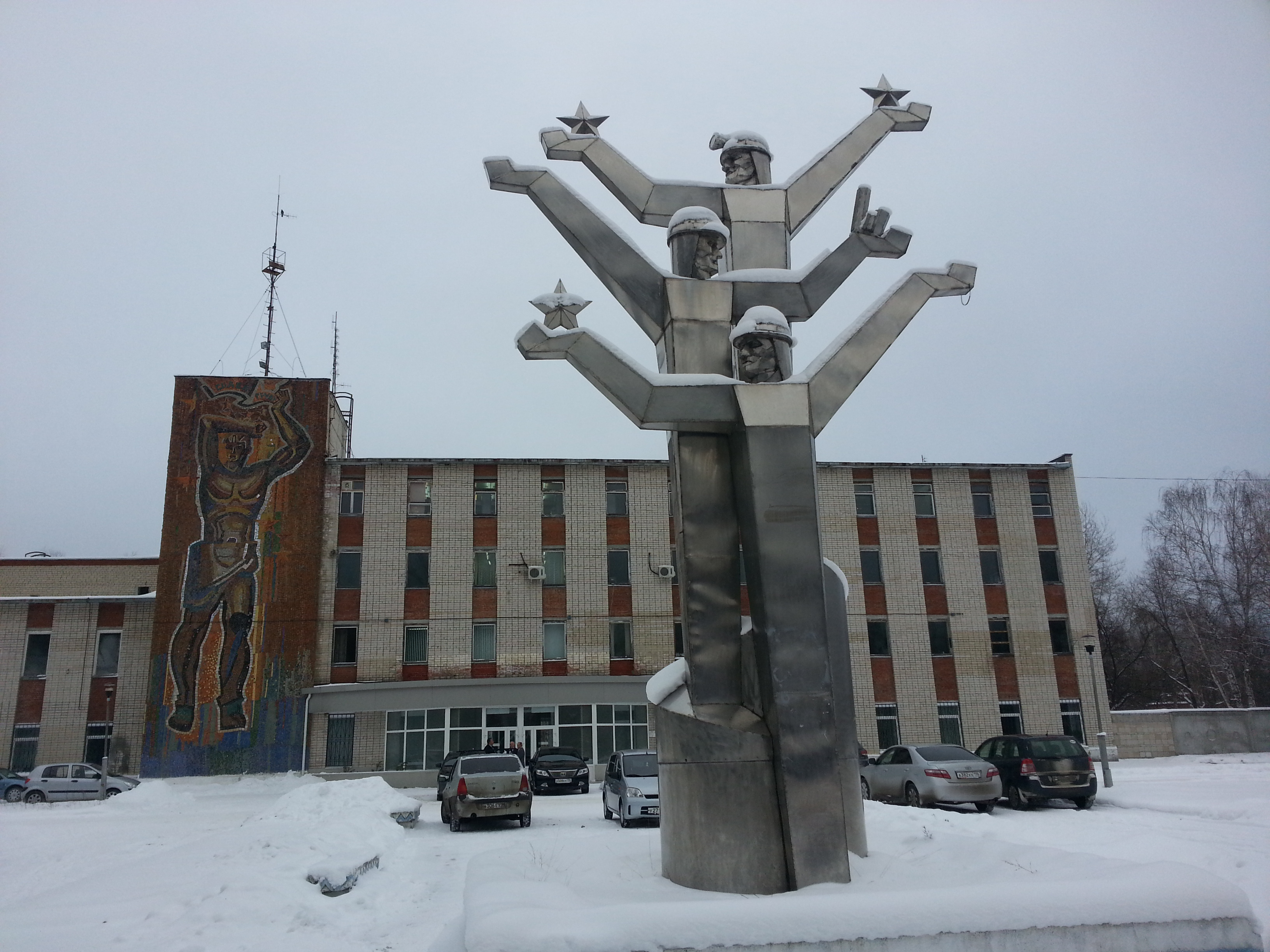

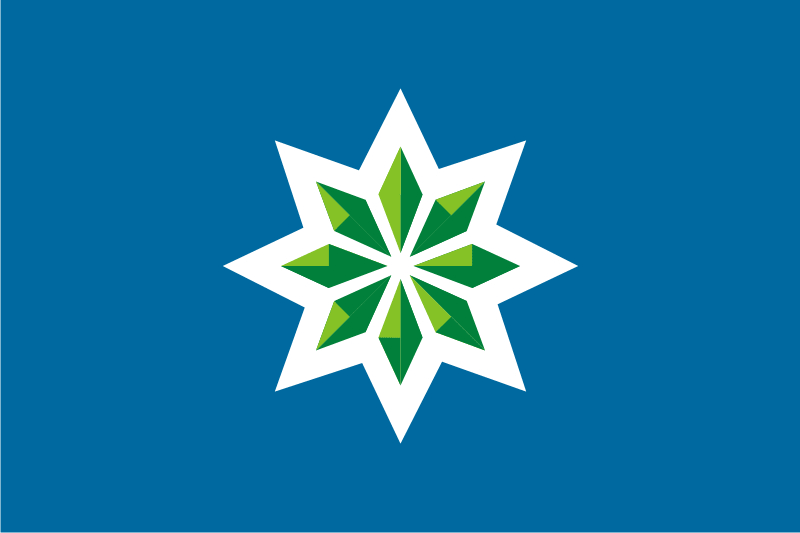
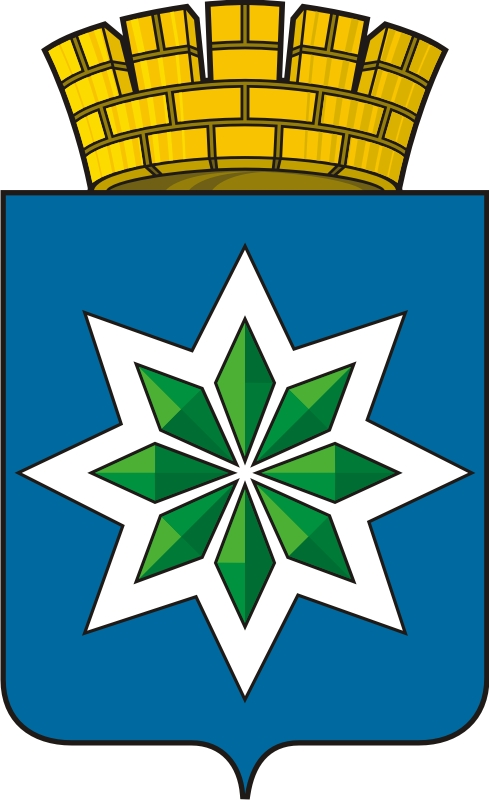
- Flag Coat of arms
- Interactive map of Malysheva
- Location of Malysheva Malysheva (Sverdlovsk Oblast)
- Coordinates: 57°06′55″N 61°24′45″E
- Country: Russia
- Federal subject: Sverdlovsk Oblast
- Founded: 1834
- Elevation: 243 m (797 ft)

Population (2010 Census)
  - Total: 9,544
  - Estimate (2025): 8,309 (−12.9%)

Administrative status
  - Subordinated to: Town of Asbest

Municipal status
  - Urban okrug: Malyshevsky Urban Okrug
  - Capital of: Malyshevsky Urban Okrug
- Time zone: UTC+5 (MSK+2)
- Postal code: 624286
- OKTMO ID: 65762000051
- Website: malyshevskiy-go.ru

Malysheva (Russian: Малышева) is an urban locality (a work settlement) under the administrative jurisdiction of the town of Asbest in Sverdlovsk Oblast, Russia. The population was 9,544 (2010 census); 10,121 (2002 census); 12,668 (1989 Soviet census).

== Administrative and municipal status ==
Within the framework of the administrative divisions, the work settlements of Malysheva and Reftinsky, together with five rural localities, are subordinated to the Town of Asbest—an administrative unit with the status equal to that of the districts. As a municipal division, Malysheva, together with three rural localities under the administrative jurisdiction of the Town of Asbest, is incorporated separately as Malyshevsky Urban Okrug. The work settlement of Reftinsky is incorporated separately as Reftinsky Urban Okrug, and the town of Asbest, together with two other rural localities, is incorporated separately as Asbestovsky Urban Okrug.
