= Lobva =

Rural locality in Novolyalinsky District, Sverdlovsk Oblast, Russia

Coordinates: 59.185°N 60.509°E

Lobva (Russian: Лобва) is a settlement located in the Novolyalinsky District of Sverdlovsk Oblast, Russia. According to a census, Lobva had 9260 inhabitants in 2010. The administrative center of the district, the town of Novaya Lyalya, lies 16 kilometers south of Lobva.

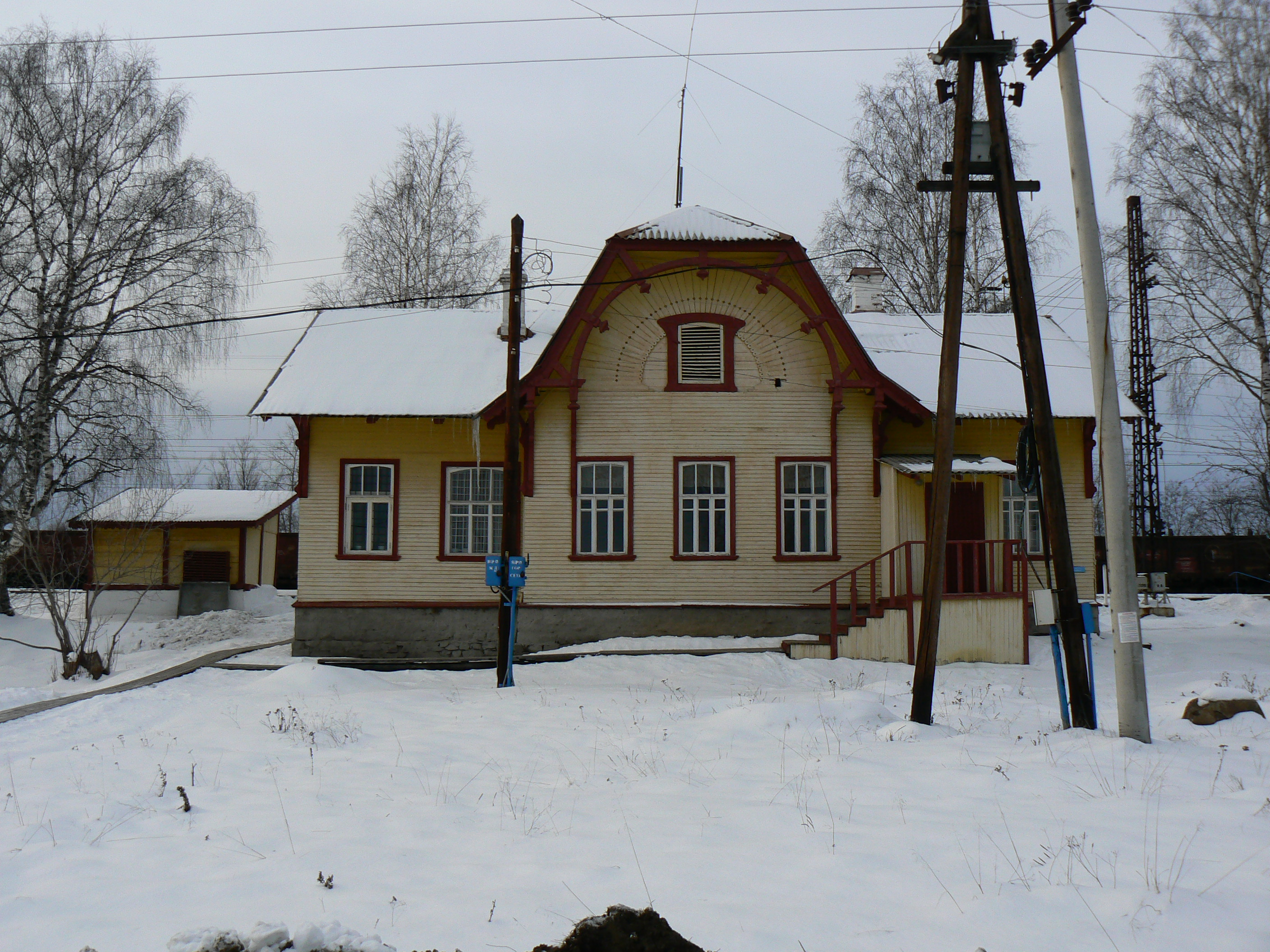
Lobva train station

Lobva is located at the confluence between the Lovba river and the Lyampa river, its tributary. The Lobva river meanders through the settlement, forming a number of oxbow lakes.

Lobva was founded on 9 November 1905 when the Lobva train station of the Bogoslovskaya Railway was created. From 1905 to 1917 Lobva was part of the Perm Governorate and became part of Sverdlovsk Oblast in 1934.
