= Kamyshlovsky District =

District in Sverdlovsk Oblast, Russia

Kamyshlovsky District Камышловский район (Russian)
- District
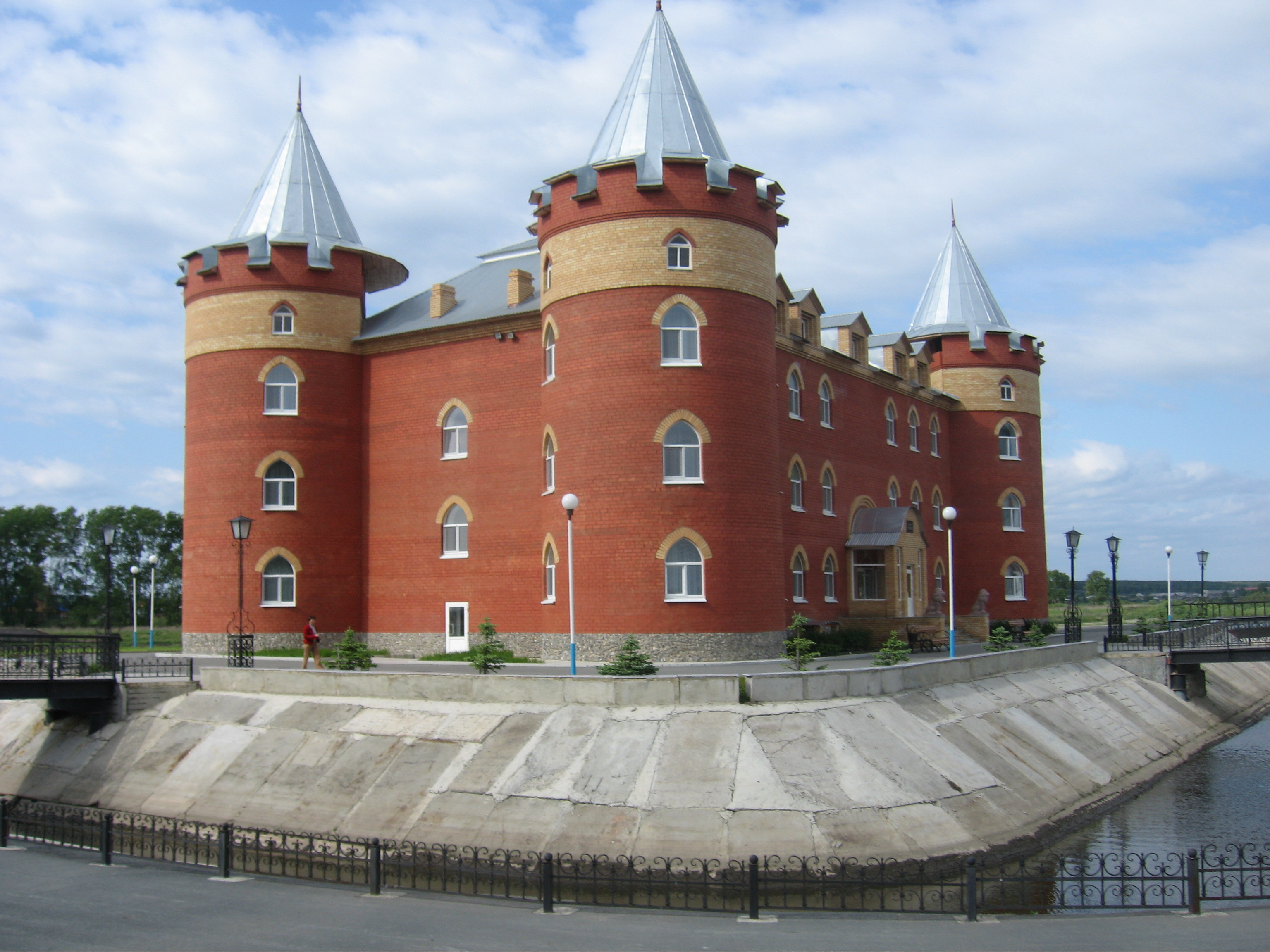
- Sanitorium in Obukhovo, Kamyshlovsky District

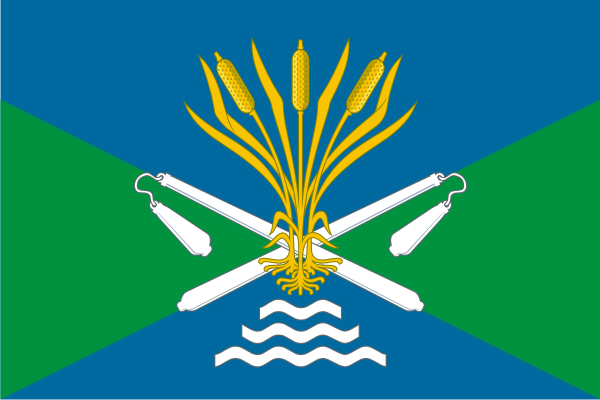
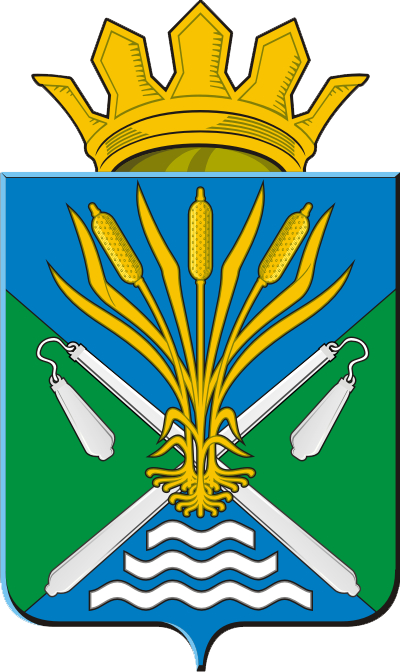
- Flag Coat of arms
- Location of Kamyshlovsky District in Sverdlovsk Oblast
- Coordinates: 56.856°N 62.128°E
- Country: Russia
- Federal subject: Sverdlovsk Oblast
- Established: 1924
- Administrative center: Kamyshlov

Area
  - Total: 2,216.6 km^{2} (855.8 sq mi)

Population (2010 Census)
  - Total: 28,162
  - Density: 12.705/km^{2} (32.906/sq mi)
  - Urban: 0%
  - Rural: 100%

Administrative structure
  - Inhabited localities: 54 rural localities

Municipal structure
  - Municipally incorporated as: Kamyshlovsky Municipal District
  - Municipal divisions: 0 urban settlements, 5 rural settlements
- Time zone: UTC+5 (MSK+2)
- OKTMO ID: 65623000
- Website: http://kamyshlovsky-region.ru/

Kamyshlovsky District (Russian: Камышло́вский райо́н) is an administrative district (raion), one of the thirty in Sverdlovsk Oblast, Russia. As a municipal division, it is incorporated as Kamyshlovsky Municipal District. The area of the district is 2,216.6 square kilometers (855.8 sq mi). Its administrative center is the town of Kamyshlov (which is not administratively a part of the district). Population: 28,162 (2010 Census); 29,048 (2002 census); 21,051 (1989 Soviet census).

== Administrative and municipal status ==
Within the framework of administrative divisions, Kamyshlovsky District is one of the thirty in the oblast. The town of Kamyshlov serves as its administrative center, despite being incorporated separately as an administrative unit with the status equal to that of the districts.

As a municipal division, the district is incorporated as Kamyshlovsky Municipal District. The town of Kamyshlov is incorporated separately from the district as Kamyshlovsky Urban Okrug.
