= Kamyshlov =

Town in Sverdlovsk Oblast, Russia

Kamyshlov Камышлов
- Town
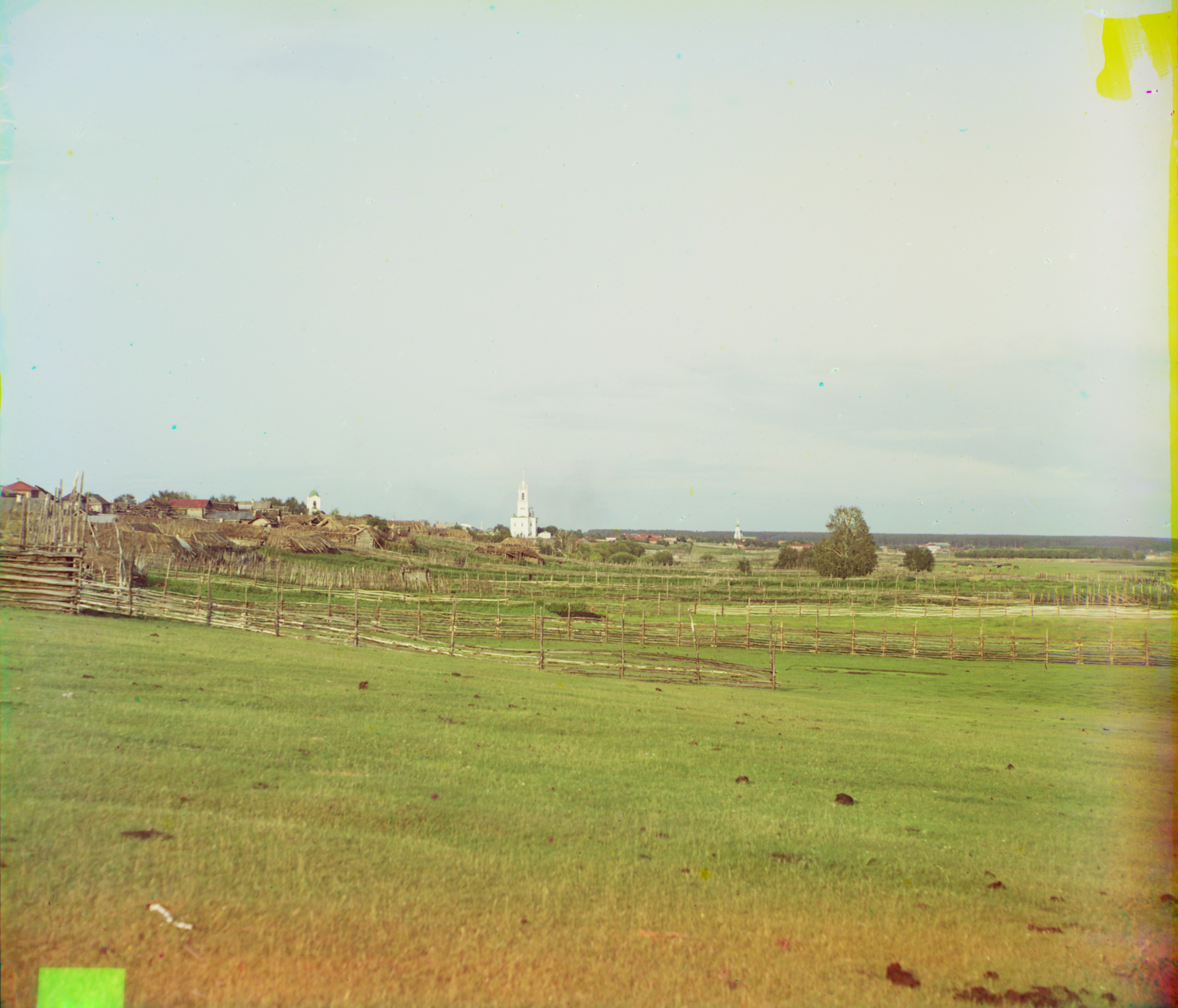
- Kamyshlov, Color photo 1912

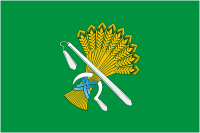
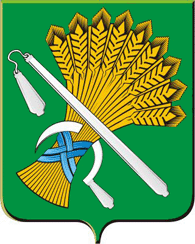
- Flag Coat of arms
- Interactive map of Kamyshlov
- Location of Kamyshlov Kamyshlov (Sverdlovsk Oblast)
- Coordinates: 56°50′N 62°43′E
- Country: Russia
- Federal subject: Sverdlovsk Oblast
- Founded: 1668
- Town status since: 1781
- Elevation: 95 m (312 ft)

Population (2010 Census)
  - Total: 26,870
  - Estimate (2025): 26,915 (+0.2%)

Administrative status
  - Subordinated to: Town of Kamyshlov
  - Capital of: Kamyshlovsky District, Town of Kamyshlov

Municipal status
  - Urban okrug: Kamyshlovsky Urban Okrug
  - Capital of: Kamyshlovsky Urban Okrug, Kamyshlovsky Municipal District
- Time zone: UTC+5 (MSK+2)
- Postal code: 624860
- OKTMO ID: 65741000001

Kamyshlov or Qamışlı (Russian: Камышло́в, Tatar: Камышлы, Qamışlı) is a town in Sverdlovsk Oblast, Russia, located on the left bank of the Pyshma River (Ob's basin) at its confluence with the Kamyshlov River. Population: 26,870 (2010 census); 28,914 (2002 census); 33,462 (1989 Soviet census).

== History ==
It was founded in 1668 Kamyshevsky ostrog. From 1687 it had been known as Kamyshlovskaya sloboda. Town status was granted to it in 1781.

== Administrative and municipal status ==
Within the framework of the administrative divisions, Kamyshlov serves as the administrative center of Kamyshlovsky District, even though it is not a part of it. As an administrative division, it is incorporated separately as the Town of Kamyshlov—an administrative unit with the status equal to that of the districts. As a municipal division, the Town of Kamyshlov is incorporated as Kamyshlovsky Urban Okrug.

== Notable people ==
- Alexander Dubrovin, far-right politician who mysteriously disappeared in 1921
