= Asbest =

Town in Sverdlovsk Oblast, Russia

Asbest Асбест
- Town
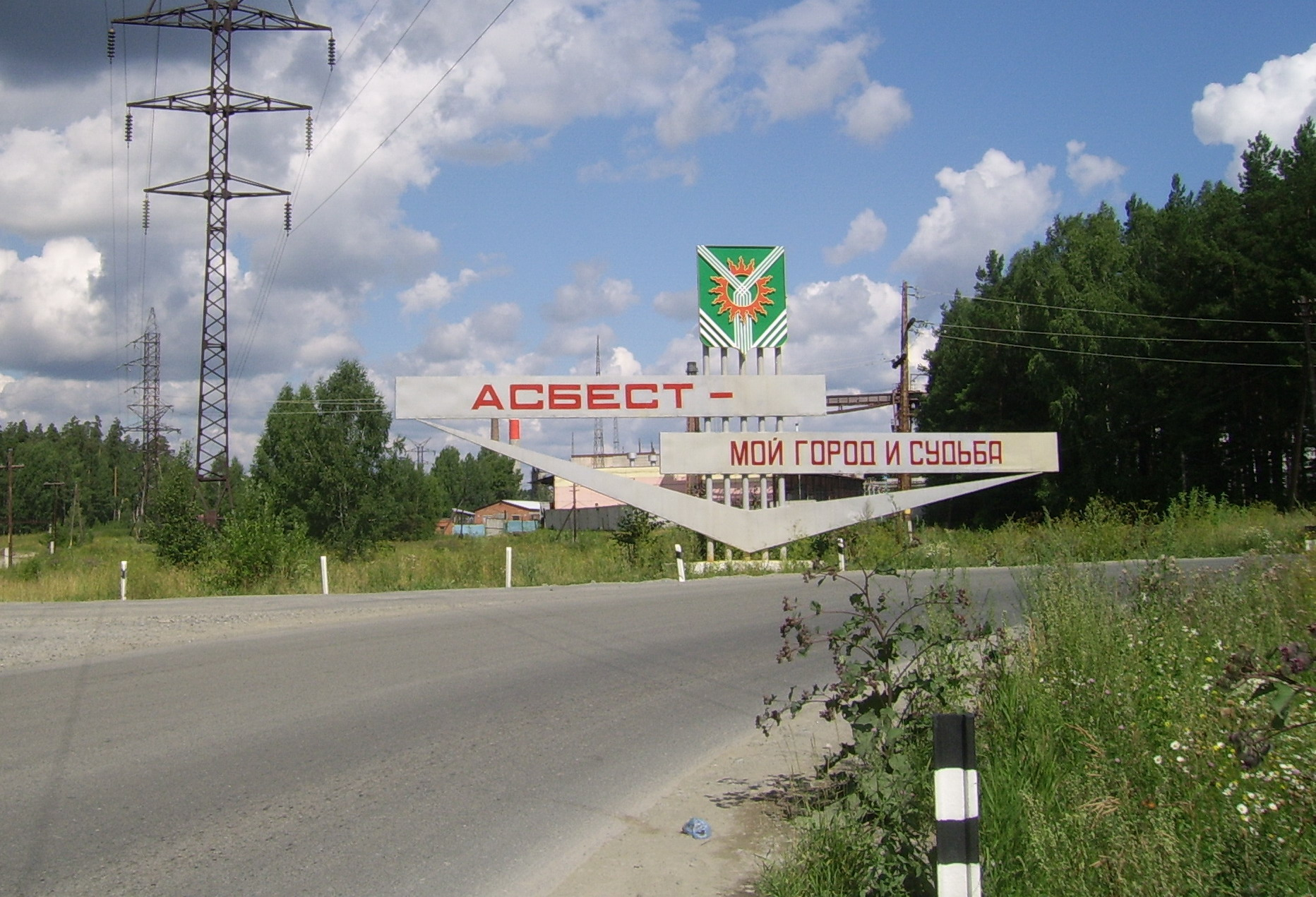
- Welcome sign at the entrance to Asbest, saying "Asbest is my town and destiny"

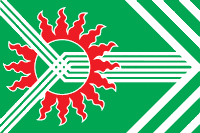
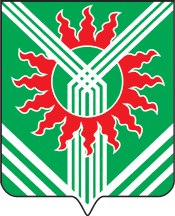
- Flag Coat of arms
- Interactive map of Asbest
- Location of Asbest Asbest (Sverdlovsk Oblast)
- Coordinates: 57°00′N 61°28′E
- Country: Russia
- Federal subject: Sverdlovsk Oblast
- Founded: 1889
- Town status since: 1933
- Elevation: 220 m (720 ft)

Population (2010 Census)
  - Total: 68,893
  - Estimate (2025): 55,518 (−19.4%)

Administrative status
  - Subordinated to: Town of Asbest
  - Capital of: Town of Asbest

Municipal status
  - Urban okrug: Asbestovsky Urban Okrug
  - Capital of: Asbestovsky Urban Okrug
- Time zone: UTC+5 (MSK+2)
- Postal code: 624260
- Dialing code: +7 34365
- OKTMO ID: 65730000001

Asbest (Russian: Асбе́ст) is a town in Sverdlovsk Oblast, Russia, located on the Bolshoy Reft River (right tributary of the Pyshma) on the eastern slopes of the Ural Mountains, 70 kilometers (43 mi) northeast of Yekaterinburg. Population: 68,893 (2010 census); 76,328 (2002 census); 84,470 (1989 Soviet census). It was previously known as Kudelka (Sliver) (until 1928). The town is named for its asbestos industry.

== Administrative and municipal status ==
Within the framework of the administrative divisions, it is, together with the work settlements of Malysheva and Reftinsky and five rural localities, incorporated as the Town of Asbest—an administrative unit with the status equal to that of the districts.

As a municipal division, Asbest and two rural localities are incorporated as Asbestovsky Urban Okrug. The urban-type settlement of Malysheva, together with three other rural localities, is incorporated separately as Malyshevsky Urban Okrug, and the urban-type settlement of Reftinsky is incorporated separately as Reftinsky Urban Okrug.

== Economy ==
Today's Asbest is a large industrial center. Joint-stock company Uralasbest is the main industrial enterprise. The chrysotile (asbestos) mine adjacent to the town is the subject of published, peer-reviewed scientific investigations about its detrimental health impact on the local population, and is said to be the world's largest. The adjacent open-pit Uralasbest mine is said to be "seven miles (11 km) long and 1 to 1.5 miles (2.5 km) wide, (and) it is nearly half the size of Manhattan — and more than a thousand feet (300 meters) deep".

Other factories include UralATI, Zarechny, Asbostroy, Asbestovskaya poultry processing plant, and a ferroconcrete production factory. Asbestos, bricks, porcelain, furniture, metal constructions, and other products are produced in Asbest.

== Education and recreation ==
The town is home to the Uralasbest stadium, which seats ten thousand people. Educational facilities include music schools, a school of art, an Olympic school, an institute of science and research, professional schools, and colleges of mining and economics. There are two museums: a geological museum and a museum of local lore.

== History ==
Asbest was founded in 1889 as Kudelka (Куделька). It was given its present name in 1928 and granted town status in 1933.

Walter Arnold Rukeyser, an electrical engineer with extensive experience with asbestos in Quebec, worked in Asbest in 1929, and again in 1930. His memoir of his times there, "Working for the Soviets; an American engineer in Russia," was published in 1932 and reprinted in 1952.

Following World War II, the Soviet Union operated the prisoner-of-war camps 84 and 314 near Asbest. In addition, from May 1950 until April 1953, up to 7700 inmates were imprisoned in the Bazhenovsky ITL gulag. Inmates had to work for the local asbestos industry; more than 15,000 died due to the conditions, including asbestos-related diseases and lack of clean water.
