= Rezhevsky District =

District in Sverdlovsk Oblast, Russia

Rezhevsky District Режевский район (Russian)
- District
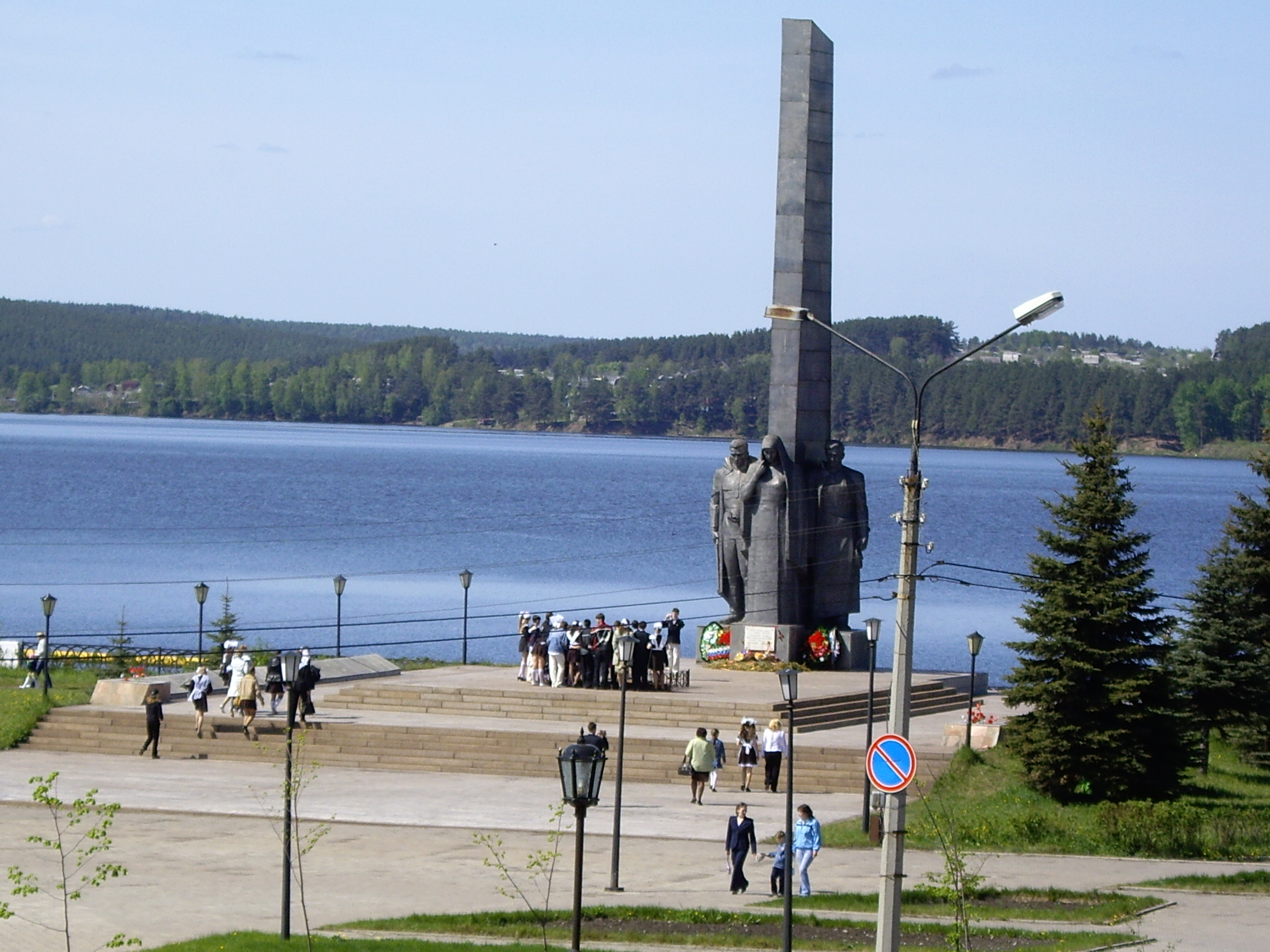
- Labor and Battle Glory Monument, Rezh

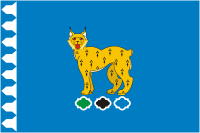
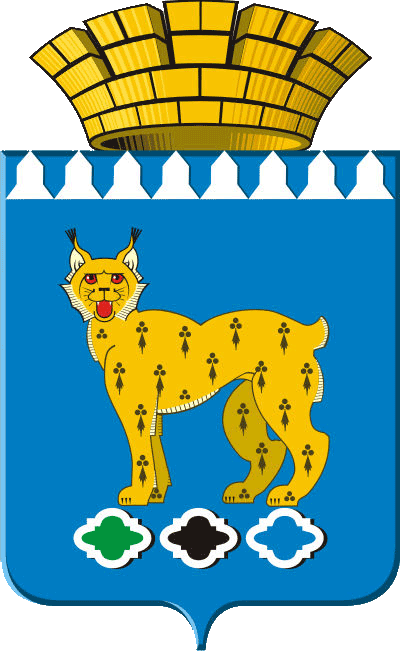
- Flag Coat of arms
- Location of Rezhevsky District in Sverdlovsk Oblast
- Coordinates: 57.397°N 61.237°E
- Country: Russia
- Federal subject: Sverdlovsk Oblast
- Established: 27 February 1924
- Administrative center: Rezh

Area
  - Total: 1,949 km^{2} (753 sq mi)

Population (2010 Census)
  - Total: 10,220
  - Density: 5.244/km^{2} (13.58/sq mi)
  - Urban: 0%
  - Rural: 100%

Administrative structure
  - Administrative divisions: 1 Towns, 9 Selsoviets
  - Inhabited localities: 1 cities/towns, 30 rural localities

Municipal structure
  - Municipally incorporated as: Rezhevskoy Urban Okrug
- Time zone: UTC+5 (MSK+2)
- OKTMO ID: 65720000
- Website: http://rezhevskoy.midural.ru/

Rezhevsky District (Russian: Режевский райо́н) is an administrative district (raion), one of the thirty in Sverdlovsk Oblast, Russia. As a municipal division, it is incorporated as Rezhevskoy Urban Okrug. The area of the district is 1,949 square kilometers (753 sq mi). Its administrative center is the town of Rezh. Population (excluding the administrative center): 10,220 (2010 Census); 10,656 (2002 census); 11,428 (1989 Soviet census).
