= Taborinsky District =

District in Sverdlovsk Oblast, Russia

Taborinsky District Таборинский район (Russian)
- District
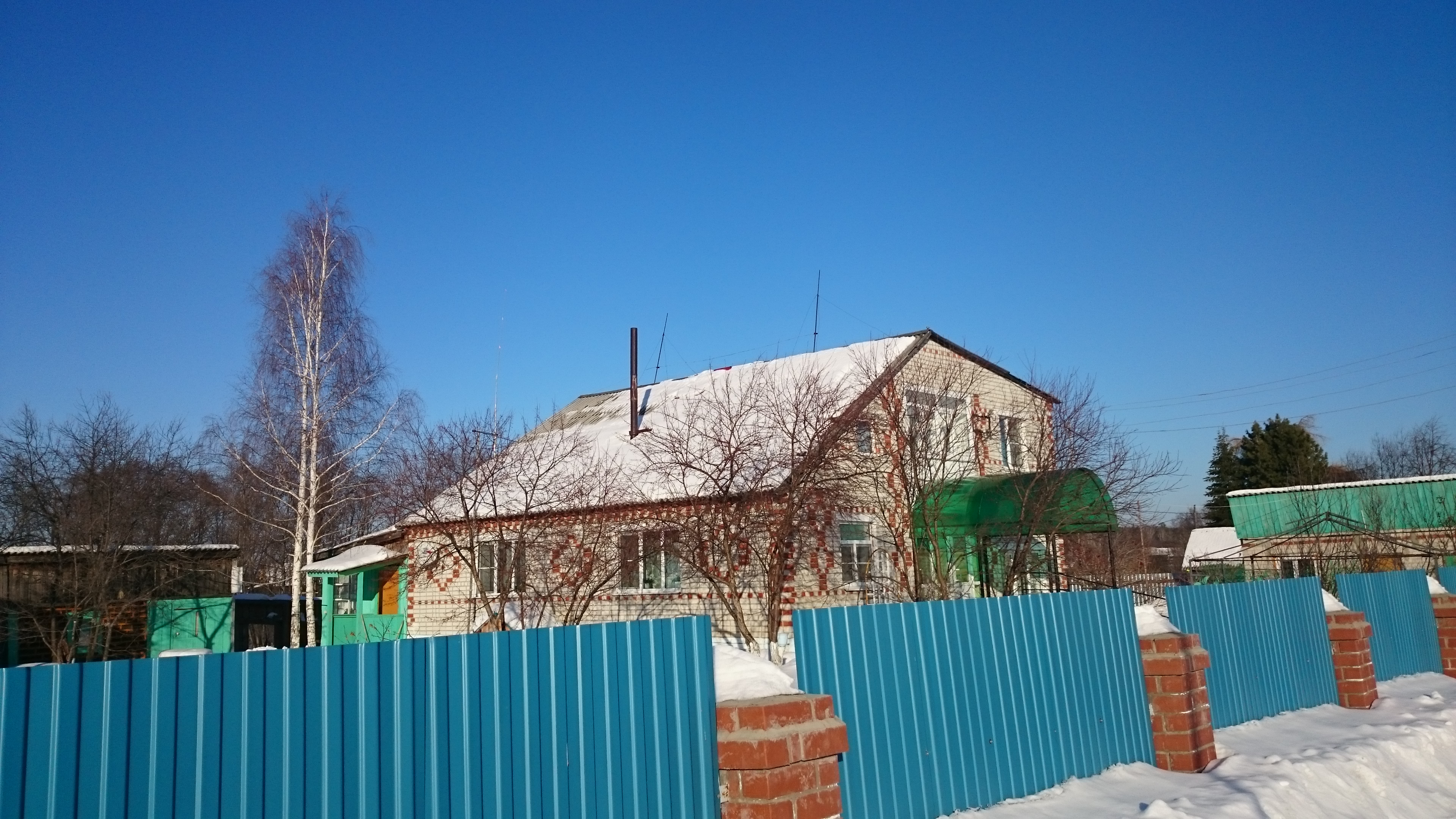
- Village in Taborinsky District

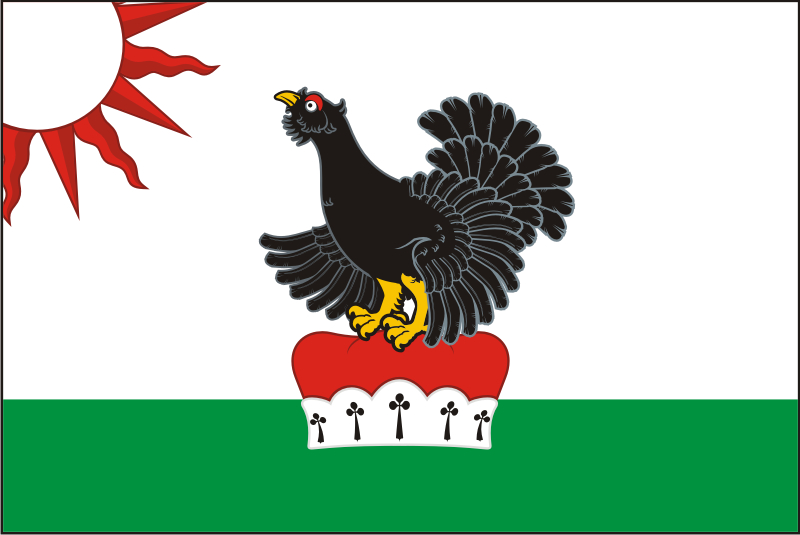
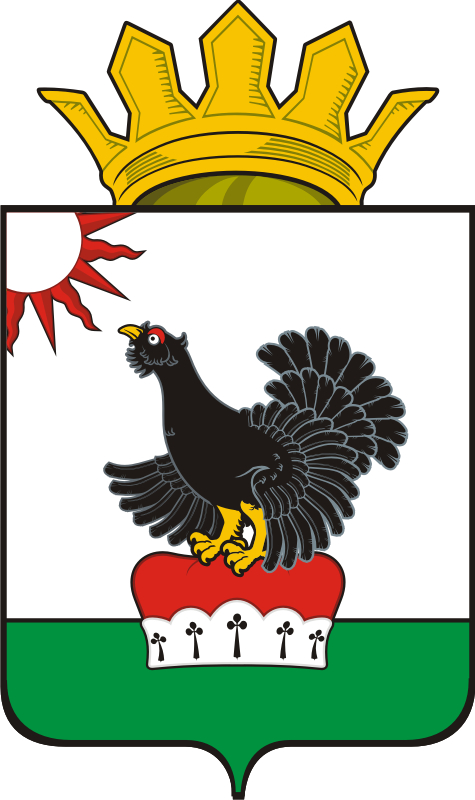
- Flag Coat of arms
- Location of Taborinsky District in Sverdlovsk Oblast
- Coordinates: 58.761°N 63.314°E
- Country: Russia
- Federal subject: Sverdlovsk Oblast
- Established: 1924
- Administrative center: Tabory

Area
  - Total: 11,367 km^{2} (4,389 sq mi)

Population (2010 Census)
  - Total: 3,574
  - Density: 0.3144/km^{2} (0.8143/sq mi)
  - Urban: 0%
  - Rural: 100%

Administrative structure
  - Inhabited localities: 34 rural localities

Municipal structure
  - Municipally incorporated as: Taborinsky Municipal District
  - Municipal divisions: 0 urban settlements, 3 rural settlements
- Time zone: UTC+5 (MSK+2)
- OKTMO ID: 65645000
- Website: http://tabory.midural.ru/

Taborinsky District (Russian: Таборинский райо́н) is an administrative district (raion), one of the thirty in Sverdlovsk Oblast, Russia. As a municipal division, it is incorporated as Taborinsky Municipal District. The area of the district is 11,367 square kilometers (4,389 sq mi). Its administrative center is the rural locality (a selo) of Tabory. Population: 3,574 (2010 Census); 5,089 (2002 census); 7,121 (1989 Soviet census). The population of Tabory accounts for 52.7% of the district's total population.
