= Artyomovsky, Sverdlovsk Oblast =

Town in Artyomovsky District, Sverdlovsk Oblast, Russia

Coordinates: 57°21′23″N 61°52′16″E

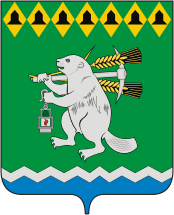
Coat of arms of Artyomovsky

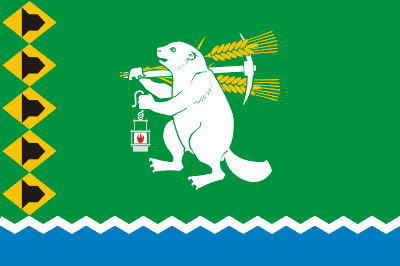
Flag of arms of Artyomovsky

Artyomovsky (Russian: Артёмовский) is a town in Sverdlovsk Oblast, Russia, located on the Bobrovka River (Irbit's tributary, Ob's basin), 120 kilometers (75 mi) northeast of Yekaterinburg. Population: 33,160 (2010 census); 34,980 (2002 census); 41,247 (1989 Soviet census).

== History ==
Founded in 1665, it was originally called Yegorshin povytok, after Yegorsha Kozhevin, a Cossack who owned the land. The village later became known as Yegorshina derevnya; in 1864 its name officially became Yegorshino (Его́ршино). A coal deposit was discovered in the vicinity of the village in 1871. During Soviet times, a settlement Imeni Artyoma (и́мени Артёма) was established near the coal deposits. In 1938, Yegorshino and Imeni Artyoma were merged into the town of Artyomovsky.

== Economy ==
Includes a bakery, thermal power plant, and others. The biggest main ventilation fan plant in CIS, Ventprom is hoisted in Artyomovsky.

== Attraktions ==
- Sovetov Square.
