= Verkhneye Dubrovo, Sverdlovsk Oblast =

Work settlement in Sverdlovsk Oblast, Russia

Verkhneye Dubrovo Верхнее Дуброво
- Work settlement
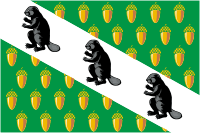
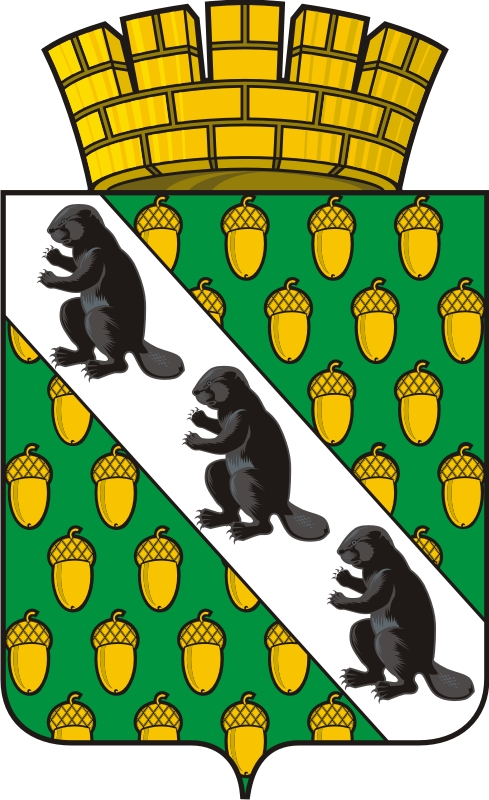
- Flag Coat of arms
- Interactive map of Verkhneye Dubrovo
- Location of Verkhneye Dubrovo Verkhneye Dubrovo (Sverdlovsk Oblast)
- Coordinates: 56°45′00″N 61°02′39″E
- Country: Russia
- Federal subject: Sverdlovsk Oblast
- Administrative district: Beloyarsky District
- Founded: 1889
- Urban-type settlement status since: 1940

Government
  - Head: Valery Konopkin

Population (2010 Census)
  - Total: 4,791
  - Estimate (2025): 4,622 (−3.5%)

Municipal status
  - Urban okrug: Verkhneye Dubrovo Urban Okrug
  - Capital of: Verkhneye Dubrovo Urban Okrug
- Time zone: UTC+5 (MSK+2)
- Postal code: 624053
- OKTMO ID: 65760000051
- Website: www.vdubrovo.ru

Verkhneye Dubrovo (Russian: Ве́рхнее Дубро́во) is an urban locality (a work settlement) in Beloyarsky of Sverdlovsk Oblast, Russia. Population: 4,791 (2010 census); 4,673 (2002 census); 5,220 (1989 Soviet census).

== History ==
Work settlement status was granted to it in 1940.

== Administrative and municipal status ==
Within the framework of administrative divisions, Verkhneye Dubrovo is subordinated to Beloyarsky District. As a municipal division, the work settlement of Verkhneye Dubrovo is incorporated as Verkhneye Dubrovo Urban Okrug.
