= Turinsky District =

District in Sverdlovsk Oblast, Russia

Turinsky District Туринский район
- District
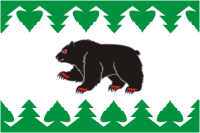
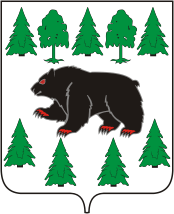
- Flag Coat of arms
- Location of Turinsky District in Sverdlovsk Oblast
- Coordinates: 58.237°N 62.477°E
- Country: Russia
- Federal subject: Sverdlovsk Oblast
- Established: December 1923
- Administrative center: Turinsk

Area
  - Total: 7,513.06 km^{2} (2,900.81 sq mi)

Population (2010 Census)
  - Total: 28,274
  - Density: 3.7633/km^{2} (9.7469/sq mi)
  - Urban: 63.4%
  - Rural: 36.6%

Administrative structure
  - Inhabited localities: 1 cities/towns, 68 rural localities

Municipal structure
  - Municipally incorporated as: Turinsky Urban Okrug
- Time zone: UTC+5 (MSK+2)
- OKTMO ID: 65726000
- Website: http://turinsk.midural.ru/

Turinsky District (Russian: Тури́нский райо́н) is an administrative district (raion), one of the thirty in Sverdlovsk Oblast, Russia. As a municipal division, it is incorporated as Turinsky Urban Okrug. Its administrative center is the town of Turinsk. Population: 28,274 (2010 Census); 32,540 (2002 Census); 40,749 (1989 Soviet census). The population of Turinsk accounts for 63.4% of the district's total population.

== History ==
In December 1923, the Turinsky district was formed as part of the Irbitsky district of the Ural region. In 1931, the territory of the liquidated Lipchinsky and Blagoveshchensky districts became part of the district. Since 1934, the district has been part of the Sverdlovsk region.

By 1930, 51 collective farms had been created in the Turin region. By 1931, their number was 158. By 1926–1927, there were 32 schools, 32 reading rooms, 5 cinemas, 1 cinema, 5 libraries in the area.[8]

According to the data of 1926 - 1928, the Turin region was considered agricultural and industrial. Of agricultural crops, wheat, oats, and winter rye were cultivated. The provision of livestock per farm is lower than the average for the district (Irbitsky), a significant share in agriculture was occupied by flax crops. Of the industrial enterprises operated: Sawmill Kamouralbumlesotrest, located at the Turinsk station of the Perm railway. The main part of the able-bodied population (more than 800 people) was employed in small industry. There were also developed suede-mitt, leather crafts, carpentry, cooperage, sledge production [9]. On the territory of the Blagoveshchensk region (now the north-west of the Turinsky region), they were also engaged in the production of tar, logging [10].

In 1939, the Pulp Mill No. 3 (now Turin Pulp and Paper Mill JSC) began its work. In 1946, Lensky District was formed from part of the territory of the Turin region. In 1952, a match factory began to operate in Turinsk. On May 4, 1956, the Lensky District was merged with the Turinsky District. In 1960, a wooden toy factory was put into operation. In 1963–1965, the Turin region was a rural area[11].

On December 17, 1995, following the results of a local referendum, the municipality of Turin District was created[12].

On December 17, 1996, the municipality was included in the regional register[13].

On December 31, 2004, the Turin region as a municipality was endowed with the status of an urban district[14].

On January 1, 2006, the municipality of the Turin district was renamed the Turin urban district[15].

Within the framework of the administrative-territorial structure of the region, the administrative-territorial unit Turin district continues to exist.
