= Baykalovsky District =

District in Sverdlovsk Oblast, Russia

Baykalovsky District Байкаловский район (Russian)
- District
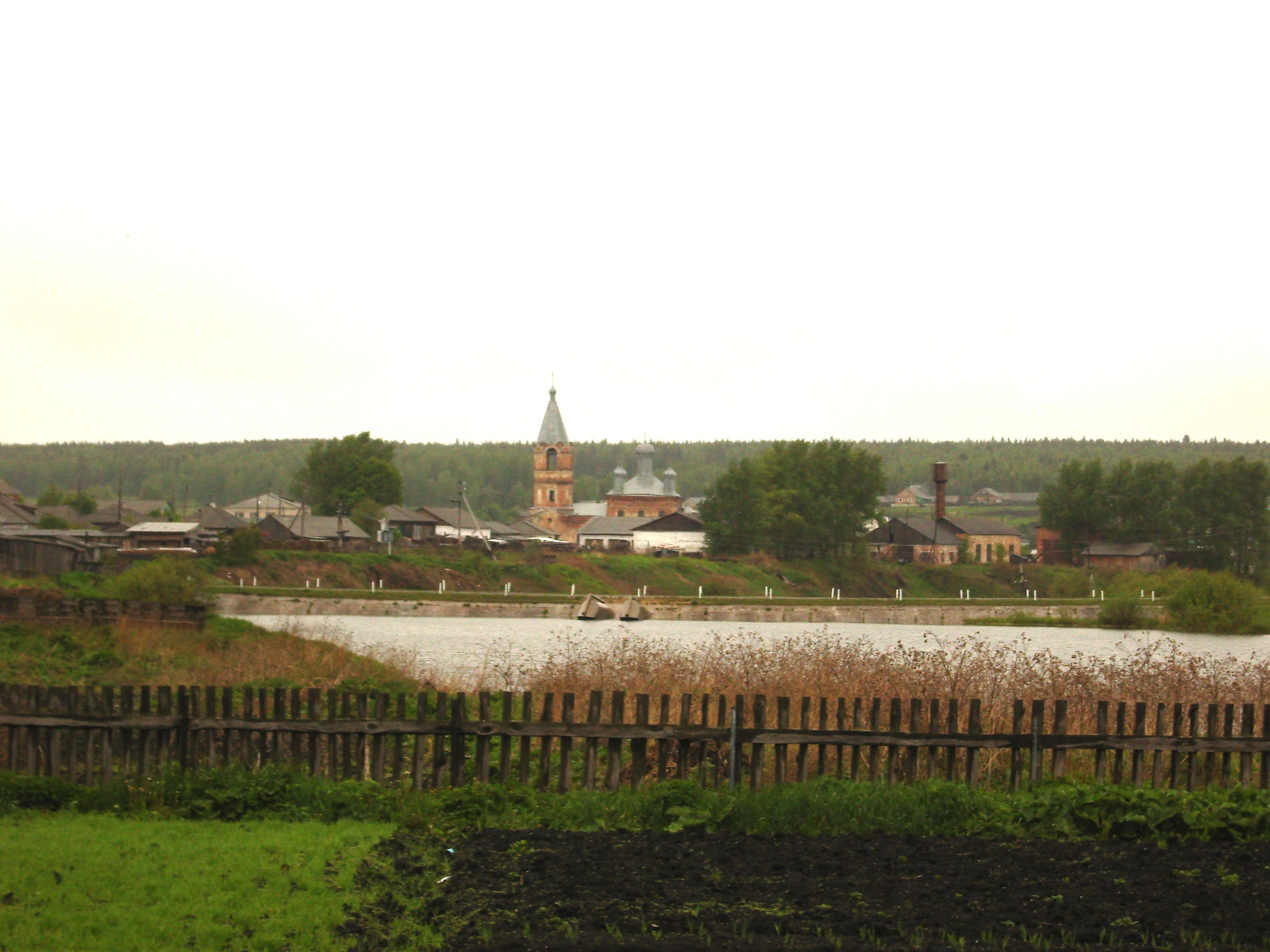
- Settlement in Baykalovsky District

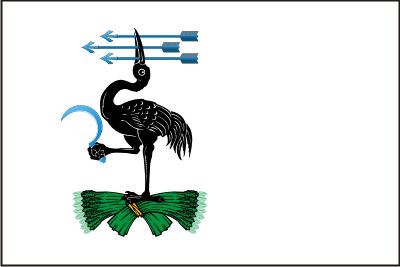
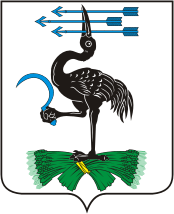
- Flag Coat of arms
- Location of Baykalovsky District in Sverdlovsk Oblast
- Coordinates: 57.518°N 62.994°E
- Country: Russia
- Federal subject: Sverdlovsk Oblast
- Established: 1923
- Administrative center: Baykalovo

Area
  - Total: 2,293.7 km^{2} (885.6 sq mi)

Population (2010 Census)
  - Total: 16,294
  - Density: 7.1038/km^{2} (18.399/sq mi)
  - Urban: 0%
  - Rural: 100%

Administrative structure
  - Inhabited localities: 68 rural localities

Municipal structure
  - Municipally incorporated as: Baykalovsky Municipal District
  - Municipal divisions: 0 urban settlements, 3 rural settlements
- Time zone: UTC+5 (MSK+2)
- OKTMO ID: 65608000
- Website: http://www.omsbmr.ru/

Baykalovsky District (Russian: Байка́ловский райо́н) is one of the thirty administrative districts (raions), in Sverdlovsk Oblast, Russia. As a municipal division, it is incorporated as the Baykalovsky Municipal District. The district covers an area of 2,293.7 square kilometers (885.6 sq mi). Its administrative center is the rural locality (a selo) of Baykalovo. Population: 16,294 (2010 Census); 19,048 (2002 census); 21,569 (1989 Soviet census). The population of Baykalovo accounts for 35.5% of the district's total population.
