= Beloyarsky District, Sverdlovsk Oblast =

District in Sverdlovsk Oblast, Russia

Beloyarsky District Белоярский район (Russian)
- District
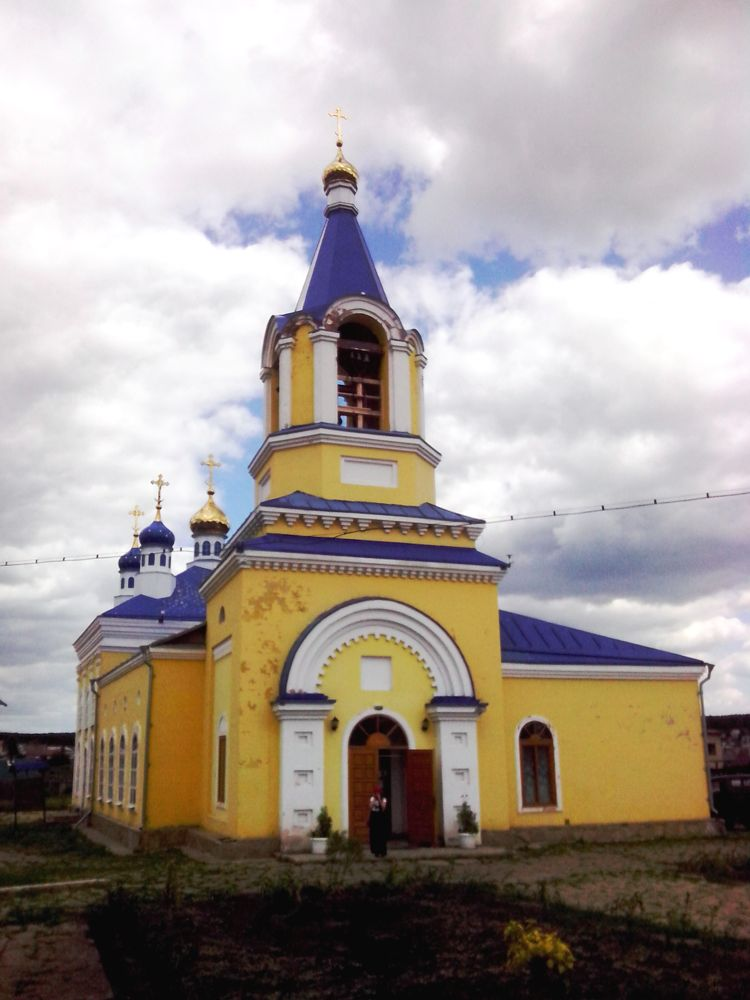
- Church of the Ascension, Gospodnya, Beloyarsky District

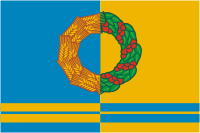
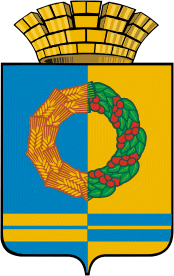
- Flag Coat of arms
- Location of Beloyarsky District in Sverdlovsk Oblast
- Coordinates: 56.750°N 61.384°E
- Country: Russia
- Federal subject: Sverdlovsk Oblast
- Established: 1924
- Administrative center: Beloyarsky

Area
  - Total: 4,901.23 km^{2} (1,892.38 sq mi)

Population (2010 Census)
  - Total: 39,374
  - Density: 8.0335/km^{2} (20.807/sq mi)
  - Urban: 44.2%
  - Rural: 55.8%

Administrative structure
  - Administrative divisions: 2 Work settlements, 11 Selsoviets
  - Inhabited localities: 2 urban-type settlements, 44 rural localities

Municipal structure
  - Municipally incorporated as: Beloyarsky Urban Okrug
- Website: http://beloyarka.com

Beloyarsky District (Russian: Белоя́рский райо́н) is an administrative district (raion), one of the thirty in Sverdlovsk Oblast, Russia. Its administrative center is the urban locality (a work settlement) of Beloyarsky. Population: 39,374 (2010 Census); 39,312 (2002 census); 69,251 (1989 Soviet census). The population of the administrative center accounts for 32.0% of the district's total population.

== Administrative and municipal status ==
Within the framework of administrative divisions, Beloyarsky District is one of the thirty in the oblast. The work settlement of Beloyarsky serves as its administrative center.

As a municipal division, the territory of the district is split between two municipal formations—Beloyarsky Urban Okrug, to which the work settlement of Beloyarsky and forty-four of the administrative district's rural localities belong, and Verkhneye Dubrovo Urban Okrug, which covers the rest of the administrative district's territory, including the work settlement of Verkhneye Dubrovo.
