= Volkov (surname) =

Volkov (Russian: Во́лков), or Volkova (feminine; Во́лкова), is a common Russian surname. It is derived from the word волк (volk, meaning "wolf").

== People ==
- Adrian Volkov (1827–1873), Russian genre painter
- Aleksei Volkov, see there for complete list
- Alexander Volkov, see there for complete list
- Alla Volkova
- Anastasia Volkova
- Anatole Volkov, courier for the Silvermaster spy ring
- Anatoly Volkov (1909–?), Soviet literary critic
- Anna Volkova
- Anna Volkova (athlete)
- Boris Volkov (1900–1970), Soviet stage designer
- Boris N. Volkov (1894–1954), Russian poet
- Bronislava Volková
- Dmitry Volkov, Russian volleyball player
- Dmitry Volkov, Soviet swimmer
- Dmitry Volkov (1718–1785), Russian statesman
- Ekaterina Volkova (rhythmic gymnast)
- Elena Volkova (basketball)
- Elena Volkova (painter)
- Esteban Volkov, grandson of Leon Trotsky
- Fyodor Volkov, "the father of the Russian theater"
- Fyodor Volkov (1847–1918), Ukrainian ethnographer, anthropologist, and archaeologist
- Fyodor Andreyevich Volkov (1898–1954), Soviet army officer and Hero of the Soviet Union
- Igor F. Volkov, a Russian soloist with the Alexandrov Ensemble
- Ilan Volkov, Israeli conductor
- Ivan Volkov (b. 1954), Russian saxophone and clarinet player and jazzman
- Julia Volkova, Russian singer, best known as a member of the girl group t.A.T.u.
- Konstantin Volkov, see there for complete list
- Leonid Volkov, Russian politician
- Liliya Volkova
- Lotta Volkova
- Lyubov Volkova
- ru:Волков, Михаил, multiple persons
  - Mikhail Volkov (born 2003), Russian footballer
- Nadezhda Volkova (1920–1942), Soviet partisan and Hero of the Soviet Union
- Nikolay Volkov (disambiguation), see there for complete list
- Nora Volkow, Director of the National Institute on Drug Abuse, United States
- Oleksandr Volkov (b. 1989), Ukrainian footballer
- Olga Volkova (b. 1939), Russian actress
- Olha Volkova (b. 1986), Ukrainian freestyle skier
- Semyon Volkov (1845–1924), Russian revolutionary
- Sergey Volkov, see there for complete list
- Shulamit Volkov, Israeli historian
- Solomon Volkov, Russian musicologist
- Valentin Volkov (painter) (1881–1964), Soviet painter
- Valery Volkov, Soviet horse rider
- Vasily Volkov (1840–1907), Russian painter
- Vasily Stepanovich Volkov (1922–?), Soviet army officer and Hero of the Soviet Union
- Vera Volkova, Russian ballet dancer
- Viktor Volkov (1917–1998), Soviet aircraft pilot and Hero of the Soviet Union
- Vitali Volkov, FC Torpedo Moscow midfielder
- Vladimir Volkov (born 1986), Montenegrin footballer
- Vladimir Volkov (musician) (born 1960), Russian contrabass player and jazzman
- Vladimir Dmitriyevich Volkov (b. 1954), Chairman of the Government of the Republic of Mordovia, Russia
- Vladislav Volkov, Soviet cosmonaut and twice Hero of the Soviet Union
- Yefim Volkov (1844–1920), Russian landscape painter
- Yekaterina Volkova (runner)
- Yekaterina Volkova (swimmer)
- Yekaterina Volkova (actress)
- Yekaterina Volkova (actress and singer)
- Yelena Volkova (swimmer)
- Yelena Volkova (volleyball)
- Zinaida Volkova, Russian Marxist, daughter of Leon Trotsky
- Yuliya Volkova (swimmer)
- Yuri Volkov, retired Soviet ice hockey player

== Fictional characters ==
- Volkov, a cyborg supersoldier created by the Soviet Union in the computer game Command & Conquer: Red Alert.
- Ivan Volkov, a Bulgarian Quidditch player featured in J.K. Rowling's 2000 fantasy novel Harry Potter and the Goblet of Fire.
- Ivan Volkov, a fictional powerful Russian (probably born Soviet) memorabilia collector played by Savannah's actor father in Swindle.
- Alex Volkov, from Twisted Love, written by Ana Huang
- Stella and Nora Volkova, from the novel Pattern Recognition by William Gibson
