= Volkova (disambiguation) =

Volkova may refer to:

- Feminine form of Volkov (surname)
- Vólkova, Argentine duo
- Volkova, Vologda Oblast, village in Russia
