= Mikhail Neznamov =

Russian serial killer (born 1979)

- Born: Mikhail Aleksandrovich Neznamov; 6 February 1979 (age 47); Kamensk-Uralsky, Sverdlovsk Oblast, RSFSR
- Other name: "The Kamensk Strangler"
- Convictions: Murder x5 Rape x5 Attempted murder Negligent homicide Theft
- Penalty: 17 years imprisonment

Details
- Victims: 6
- Span of crimes: 2000–2005
- Country: Russia
- State: Sverdlovsk
- Date apprehended: 4 February 2023

Mikhail Aleksandrovich Neznamov (Russian: Михаил Александрович Незнамов; born 6 February 1979), known as The Kamensk Strangler (Russian: Каменский душитель), is a Russian serial killer who murdered at least five teenage girls and women in Kamensk-Uralsky, Sverdlovsk Oblast from 2000 to 2005. He remained undetected until 2023 when he was arrested and subsequently confessed to the crimes.

He would later be convicted for the murders in a trial, but despite the severity of his crimes, he was sentenced to a more lenient sentence of 17 years imprisonment.

== Early life ==
Neznamov was born on 6 February 1979, in Kamensk-Uralsky, where he grew up in a nine-storey apartment block on Aluminievaya Street. The end of the street faced the right bank of the Iseti River, densely overgrown with bushes and reeds, in the vicinity of which he would later commit his killings.

Neznamov attended Gymnasium No. 9, where he was described as an average student who exhibited no deviant behaviour. After graduating in the mid-1990s, he received secondary vocational training and later engaged in low-skilled labour, occasionally committing thefts.

=== Investigation and exposure ===
Between 9 May 2000, and December 2005, Neznamov raped and murdered at least five girls and women, besides the negligent homicide charge. The victims were between the ages of 17 and 29, whom he met on the streets of Kamensk-Uralsky and then took to deserted areas where they were attacked, raped and strangled to death. To commit the murders, Neznamov used the victims' own clothing, such as pantyhose, sweaters or jeans, as well as a dog leash. He did not attempt to conceal his crimes, as he left behind evidence and semen at the crime scenes. Despite this, the crimes went unsolved at the time until they were re-investigated in 2014 by the Sverdlovsk Investigative Committee.

In 2022, the Committee focused their attention on the murder of 17-year-old Alla Sapogova, who was raped and strangled on 9 May 2000. The perpetrator left traces of seminal fluid on the girl's bra, but at the time, the prosecutor's office did not have the necessary equipment to conduct DNA sampling. As four other victims were murdered in a similar manner until 2005, local investigators concluded a serial killer was operating in the area. Utilizing this information, Maurice Isakidis, an investigator for the Committee assigned to high-profile cases, ordered a DNA test on the seminal fluid found on Sapogova's bra. The results showed that the genotypic profile of the killer matched that of Mikhail Neznamov, from whom a blood sample had been taken in the mid-2010s as part of an investigation into a crime that he had committed near his hostel.

In 2001, Neznamov first came to the attention of the police after he was charged with a negligent homicide. He would later be convicted of this charge and sentenced to 5 years imprisonment, but was granted parole and released at the end of 2003. In 2006, he was arrested for theft and attempted murder, was convicted yet again and sentenced to 8 years imprisonment on 22 October 2007. After serving 5 years, he was paroled in 2012.

Shortly afterwards, he got into an argument with his parents and was subsequently forced to move into a five-storey hostel on Chelyabinskaya Street. After the move, Neznamov got a job as a mechanic at a local enterprise and got married, but the marriage did not last long. In later years, he began to exhibit an increased libido and desire for sexual activity. He spent most of his free time meeting various women, many of whom became his cohabitants and lived with him for periods ranging from several days to several months.

As a person, Neznamov was characterized ambiguously by friends and acquaintances - some considered him a kind, helpful extrovert who resolved conflicts, while others viewed him as an alcoholic who neglected to pay his utility bills and loans. In addition, neighbors at the hostel claimed that he became aggressive when intoxicated and often clashed with bailiffs. Between June 2018 and May 31, 2022, Neznamov was on the list of candidates for jury duty at the Sinarsky District Court in Kamensk-Uralsky.

== Arrest ==
As a result, Neznamov was arrested without incident on 4 February 2023, in Kamensk-Uralsky. Initially, he refused to cooperate with the investigators and denied his guilt. According to Valery Gorelykh, the press secretary for the Sverdlovsk Oblast's Department of the Ministry of Internal Affairs, Neznamov was compared to the character Fox from the cult film The Meeting Place Cannot Be Changed, taunting them to "prove it" when referring to the murder charges.

A few days after his arrest, however, Neznamov had a change of heart and, with the help of his lawyer, made a plea deal with the prosecutor's office. In exchange for leniency from the court, he agreed to cooperate with investigators and confess to the murders, describing in detail what had happened. Between February and the fall of 2023, Neznamov participated under escort in investigative experiments to reproduce what occurred on the day of each murder.

He admitted that his first victim was Sapogova, whom he had encountered while she was returning home from a disco. Neznamov specified that after raping the girl, he strangled her with a belt taken from her raincoat. He then said that he committed the last two murders in September and December 2005. According to him, he killed one of the victims in a fit of anger after she had the indiscretion to call him a failure of a man.

== Trial ==
At the trial, Neznamov was found guilty of all charges against him, after which he was sentenced to 17 years imprisonment. During sentencing, he expressed remorse for what he had done and apologized to the victims' relatives. The sentence sparked outrage from the victims' family members, who said that he deserved to be sentenced to life imprisonment. In response to this, the press service of the Krasnogorsk District Court released a press statement in which they clarified that since the statute of limitations for the qualified murder charge had passed, they would be unable to sentence him to life imprisonment.

Neznamov himself was satisfied with the sentence and later did not file an appeal, after which the sentence was confirmed in November 2023. Following this, he was transferred to a corrective labour colony, where he has the right to apply parole after serving 12 years of his sentence.

== See also ==
- List of Russian serial killers
