= Kamensk plant master's manor house =

Historical building

Kamensk plant master’s manor house
- Усадьба смотрителя Каменского завода
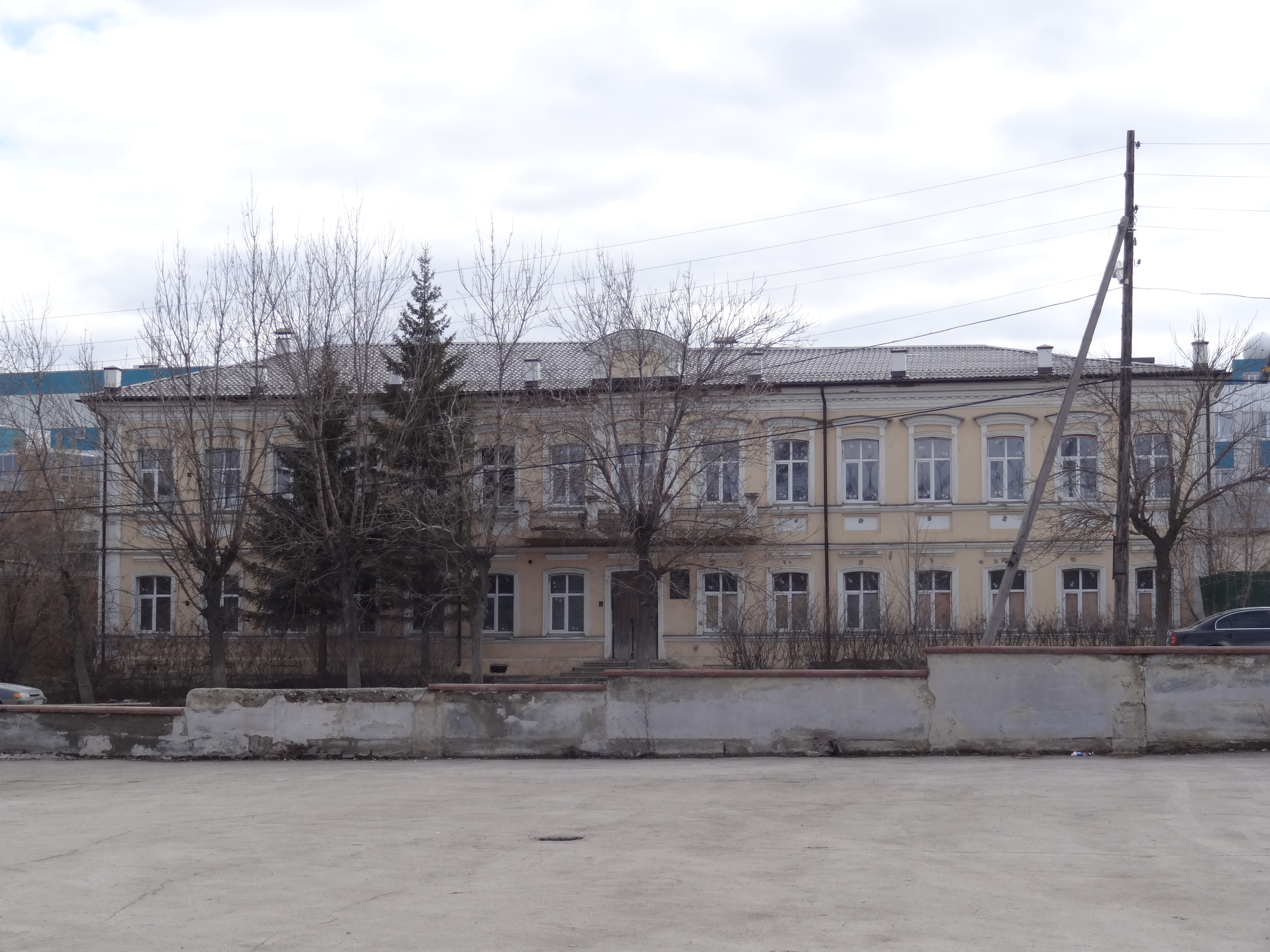
- Interactive map of the Kamensk plant master’s manor house area

General information
- Architectural style: Eclecticism
- Location: Kamensk-Uralsky, 117, 119 Lenin Street
- Coordinates: 56°25′02″N 61°53′29″E
- Completed: 1880s

Kamensk plant master’s manor house – is an architectural complex in the historical center of Kamensk-Uralsky, Sverdlovsk oblast.

The building was granted the status of regional significance on 28 December 2001 (the Sverdlovsk oblast Government Decree № 859). The object number of cultural heritage of regional significance is 661721097870005.

== Description ==
The owner of the manor house was the Kamensk Ironworksmaster. The complex includes a residential house (117 Lenin Street), a coachman’s house (8/1 Pionerskaya Street), a bathhouse and a number of household outbuildings (119 Lenin Street). The building represents a good sample of a manor house for the 1870-1880s period. It has a typical asymmetric angular position on the plot of land. The building on 119 Lenin Street has the historical significance also as a headquarters of the Red Guards in 1917.

The construction of the manor house has a rectangular shape. The main two-storey building is made of stone and also has a rectangular shape. It forms the northeast corner of the plot of land. The main northern facade faces the Lenin Street (former Bolshaya Moskovskaya Street). On the central axis of the facade is a balcony and an attic. Inside the courtyard there is a covered terrace at the second floor. In the original plan there should have been the main entrance to the house. But later it was transferred to the side of the northern facade. The southern facade is a bit higher because of the high barrier wall. The elements of eclecticism and classicism can be found in the decoration of the building.

Nowadays the Kamensk diocesan administration of the Russian Orthodox Church functions in the building.

The household outbuilding on the territory of the manor house is hardly reconstructed and as a result lost its original appearance. The original construction of the roof and the covered gallery didn't survive to this day. Later additional window openings were installed on the first and the second tier. In the original version, the door and window openings of the first tier were made with arched crosspieces without extra decor. On the second floors of the western and eastern facades there are small round window openings. The side of the second floor of the eastern facade, in contrast to the smooth western, has a plastic working surface of the wall: a round window frames a flat clypeus, the window itself is inscribed in a wide corbel arch, and the corners of the wall are flanked by flat blades. On the northern facade are attached tablets with the inscription: "For the Soviet Power." and "In 1917 there was the headquarters of the Red Guards in this building."

A coachman’s house is a one-storey rectangular building along the red line of Pionerskaya Street.

== Literature ==
- ред. В.Е.Звагельская Свод памятников истории и культуры Свердловской области. Vol. 2. Екатеринбург: Сократ. 2008. p. 648. ISBN 978-5-88664-323-7.
- Памятники архитектуры Каменска-Уральского / С. И. Гаврилова, Л. В. Зенкова, А. В. Кузнецова, А. Ю. Лесунова — Екатеринбург: Банк культурной информации, 2008. — 92 с.
