= Kosyakov manor house =

- Усадьба купца Косякова
- Interactive map of the Kosyakov manor house area

General information
- Location: Kamensk-Uralsky, 101 Lenin Street
- Coordinates: 56°24′58″N 61°53′48″E
- Completed: the end of the 19th century

Kosyakov manor house is located in the historical center of Kamensk-Uralsky, Sverdlovsk oblast.

The building was granted the status of regional significance on 28 December 2001 (the Sverdlovsk Oblast Government Decree № 859). The object number of cultural heritage of regional significance is 661720983690005.

== History ==
The first owner was a Kamensk grain merchant, I.S. Kosyakov, who built the house. The manor consisted of a wooden house, brick shop and household outbuildings. The Vasilievs' shop adjoined the western part of Kosyakov's land. At the end of the 19th century, the merchant Molchanov rented the merchant Vasilievs' shop.

During the Russian Revolution period Kosyakov left the manor house. Later the building was nationalised and was used by different firms and offices.

In modern times, there is a car repair shop and a service center in the building.

== Architecture ==
The house is located in the historical center of the old part of Kamensk-Uralsky on the intersection of Lenin Street (the former Bolshaya Moskovskaya Street) and Sverdlov Street. The building is on the corner of the block structure.

The one-storied wooden house is oriented from north to south. The northern and the eastern facades face the street. The facades are constructed and decorated in the same way. The eastern facade has eight window axes. The arched windows are ornamented with dripstones. The ledges of the windows are carved. The northern facade has five window axes. The walls of the building are plastered and painted. The pedestal is faced with a granite block. A mud room is attached in the courtyard.

During reconstruction in the 20th century, many changes were made.

the shop building is constructed with the elements of eclectism. The main facade faces Lenin Street.

== Literature ==
- ред. В.Е.Звагельская (2008). Свод памятников истории и культуры Свердловской области. Vol. 2. Екатеринбург: Сократ. p. 648. ISBN 978-5-88664-323-7.
- Памятники архитектуры Каменска-Уральского / С. И. Гаврилова, Л. В. Зенкова, А. В. Кузнецова, А. Ю. Лесунова — Екатеринбург: Банк культурной информации, 2008. — 92 с.
