= Bucharev manufactory shop =

Architectural monument in Russia

- Мануфактурный магазин Бухарева
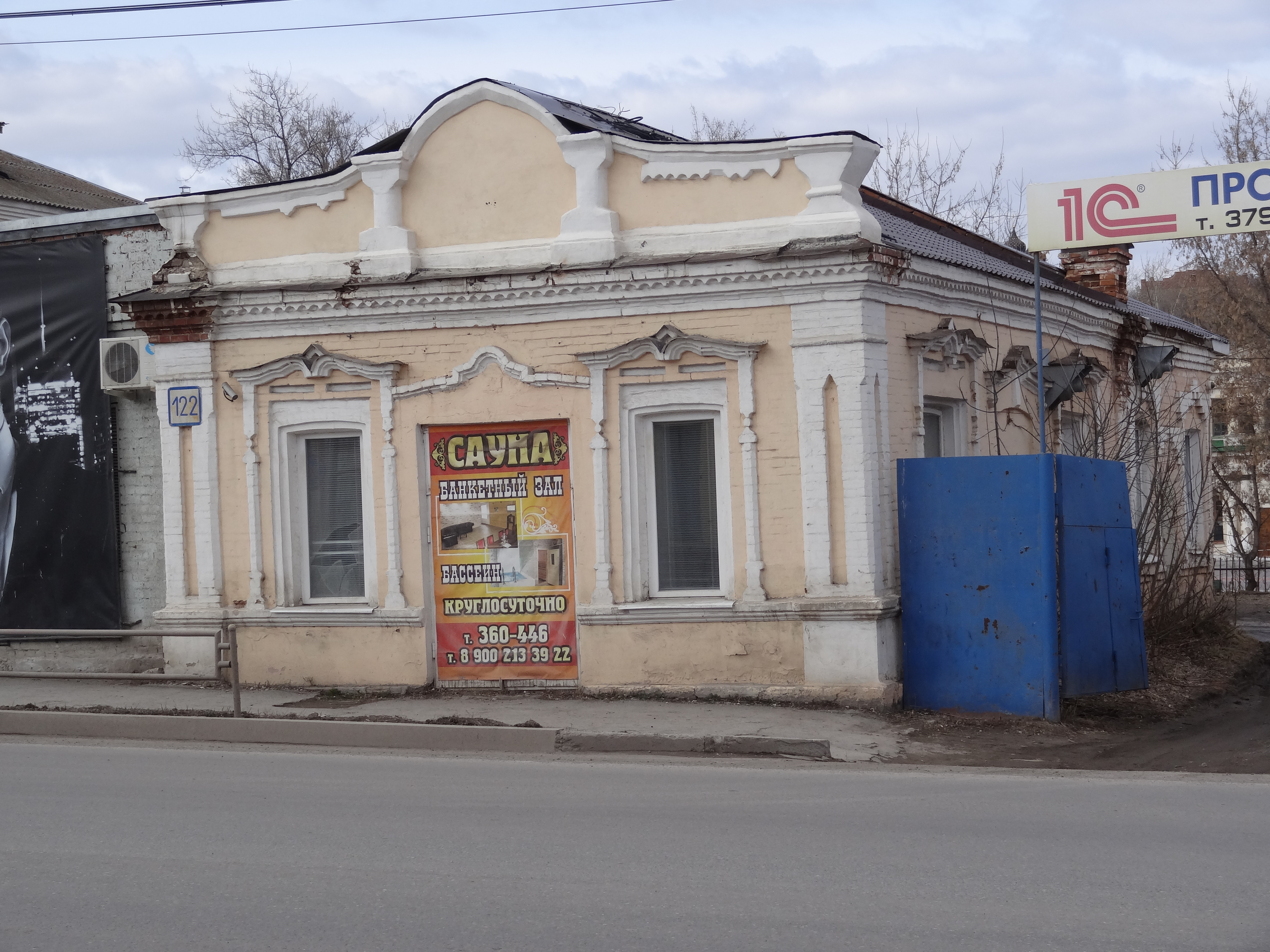
- Interactive map of the Bucharev manufactory shop area

General information
- Architectural style: Brick style
- Location: Kamensk-Uralsky, 122 Lenin Street
- Coordinates: 56°25′01″N 61°53′39″E
- Completed: the 19th century

The Bucharev manufactory shop is an architectural monument in the historical center of Kamensk-Uralsky, Sverdlovsk oblast.

The building was granted the status of regional significance on 31 December 1987 (decision No. 535 by the executive committee of Sverdlovsk oblast Council of People's Deputies). The object number of cultural heritage of regional significance is 661710794030005.

== Architecture ==
The house was built in the second half of the 19th century. It is located in the merchant center of the historical part of the town on Lenin Street (formerly Bolshaya Moskovskaya Street). It is suited to the architecture of old Kamensk.

The one-storey brick building bases on quarried stone foundation with the main southern facade. The building with inclined and slate roof. The house area is shaped like a rectangle, stretching from north to south. The composition of the facade is symmetrical. The central axis provides a wide doorway. A small attic decorates the upper part of the wall. There are two tall windows on either side of the doorway. The window openings are decorated with the elements of the circle brick surrounds. In the lower part of the window openings is a relief cornice with protruding pilaster-strips. The same decor of the window openings is used for the eastern facade. The composition of the eastern facade is asymmetric, it is divided by a ledged pilaster into two unequal parts. In the right part which is far from Lenin Street the elements of the decor are simplified. The northern and western facades are constructed as solid walls.

In the original plan the building has three entrances: the first faces the street, two other doorways are on side of the eastern facade. Nowadays the entrances on side of the eastern and western facades are bricked up. An additional doorway is made on side of the northern facade. The transverse wall divides the rectangular plan into two unequal parts connected by a gap.

The Bucharev's manufactory shop is a model of a typical shopping mall built with the elements of eclecticism (so called "brick style") of the 19th century. The year of construction is unknown. The restoration work hasn't proceeded.

== Literature ==
- Свод памятников истории и культуры Свердловской области. Vol. 2. Екатеринбург: Сократ. 2008. p. 648. ISBN 978-5-88664-323-7 – via ред. В.Е.Звагельская.
- Памятники архитектуры Каменска-Уральского / С. И. Гаврилова, Л. В. Зенкова, А. В. Кузнецова, А. Ю. Лесунова — Екатеринбург: Банк культурной информации, 2008. — 92 с.
