= Ural Aluminum Smelter Proletarian's Group of Houses =

- Городок алюминщиков
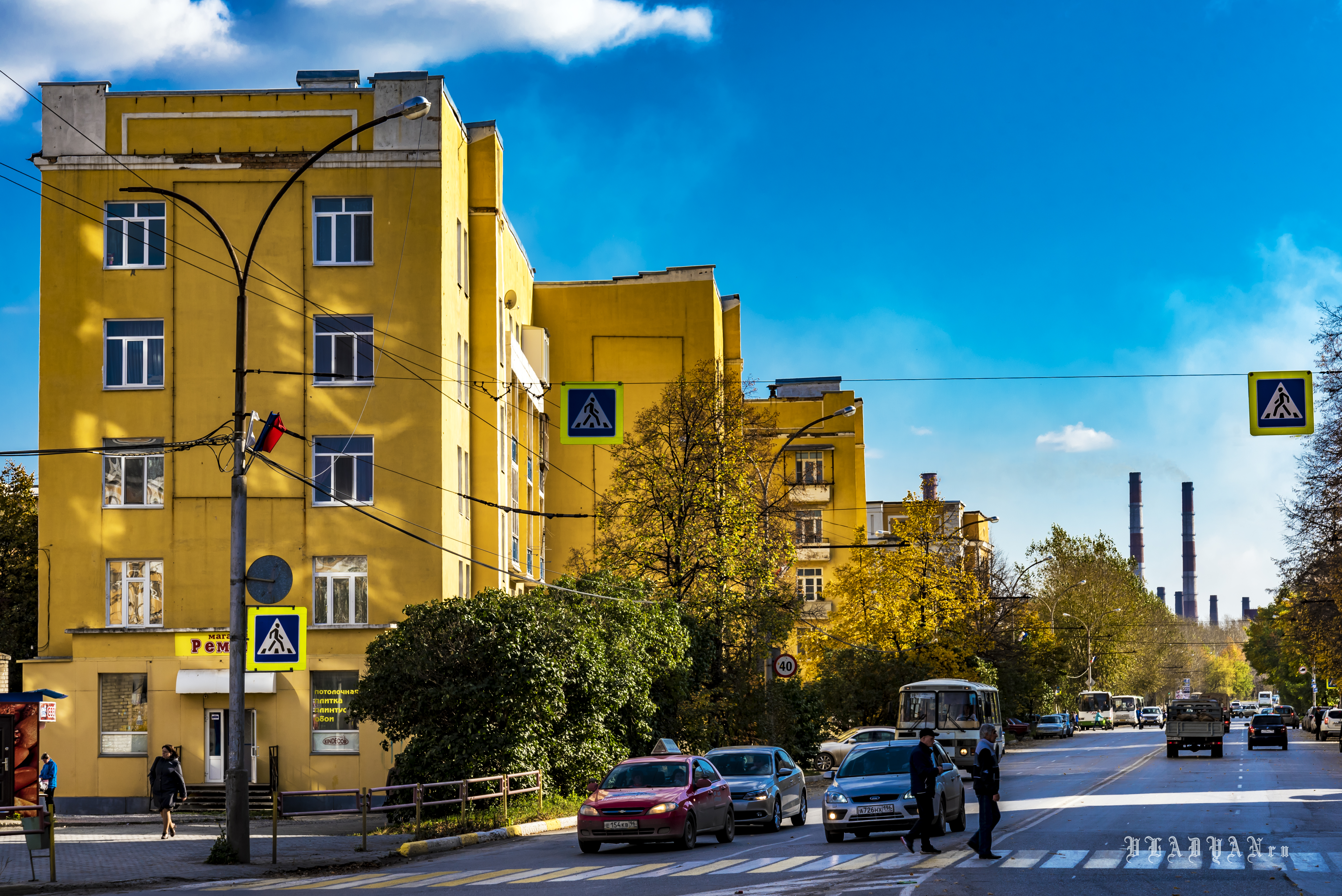
- Interactive map of the Ural Aluminum Smelter Proletarian's Group of Houses area

General information
- Architectural style: Constructivism
- Location: Kamensk-Uralsky, 12 Aluminievaya Street, 11 Isetskaya Street, 9 Kamenskaya Street, 10 Stroiteley Street
- Coordinates: 56°22′58″N 61°58′11″E
- Completed: 1937

Design and construction
- Architect: G.P. Valenkov

Ural Aluminum Smelter Proletarian's Group of Houses is a complex of residential buildings in Kamensk-Uralsky, Sverdlovsk oblast.

The building was granted the status of regional significance on 28 December 2001 (the Sverdlovsk oblast Government Decree № 859). The object number of cultural heritage of regional significance is 661720974950005.

== Architecture ==
The buildings have important city-forming significance, they are examples of residential buildings erected in forms of constructivism with decor in the forms of Soviet neoclassicism. The complex of the central housing section is a sample of the socialist city of the 1930s.

In 1934, the Leningrad design organization "Editing Project Aluminum" developed the "General Plan for the Ural Aluminum Plant with an adjacent working population of 20,000 inhabitants." According to this project, the construction of the block began with the first high-rise buildings. The complex laid the foundation for the creation of the central part of the residential area of the socialist city of UAZ.

The project is based on the plan "Town of Chekists" in Yekaterinburg (then Sverdlovsk), executed in 1929. In the central part of the complex there were to be social and cultural facilities, and in the north-western part - the hostel "Corps of Bachelors". The project laid the foundation of the courtyard: fountains, small architectural forms.

The complex consists of four houses, each of which is divided into three five-story volume, connected with each other by the ends with displacement. The facades of the buildings are separated by vertical projections into which are laid staircases and balconies. The balconies are combined vertically and horizontally in the composition. The front facades of the houses along the streets of Kamenskaya and Aluminievaya are decorated with friezes with geometric patterns. The upper parts of the southern and eastern facades of the houses along the streets of Builders and Isetskaya are decorated with geometric ornament.

== Literature ==
- В.Е.Звагельская, ed. (2008). Свод памятников истории и культуры Свердловской области. Vol. 2. Екатеринбург: Сократ. p. 648. ISBN 978-5-88664-323-7.
- Памятники архитектуры Каменска-Уральского / С. И. Гаврилова, Л. В. Зенкова, А. В. Кузнецова, А. Ю. Лесунова — Екатеринбург: Банк культурной информации, 2008. — 92 с.

== Sources ==
- Неизвестный Каменск, серия 3 (Красногорский район) on YouTube
