= Grachev merchants' revenue house =

- Доходный дом купцов Грачёвых
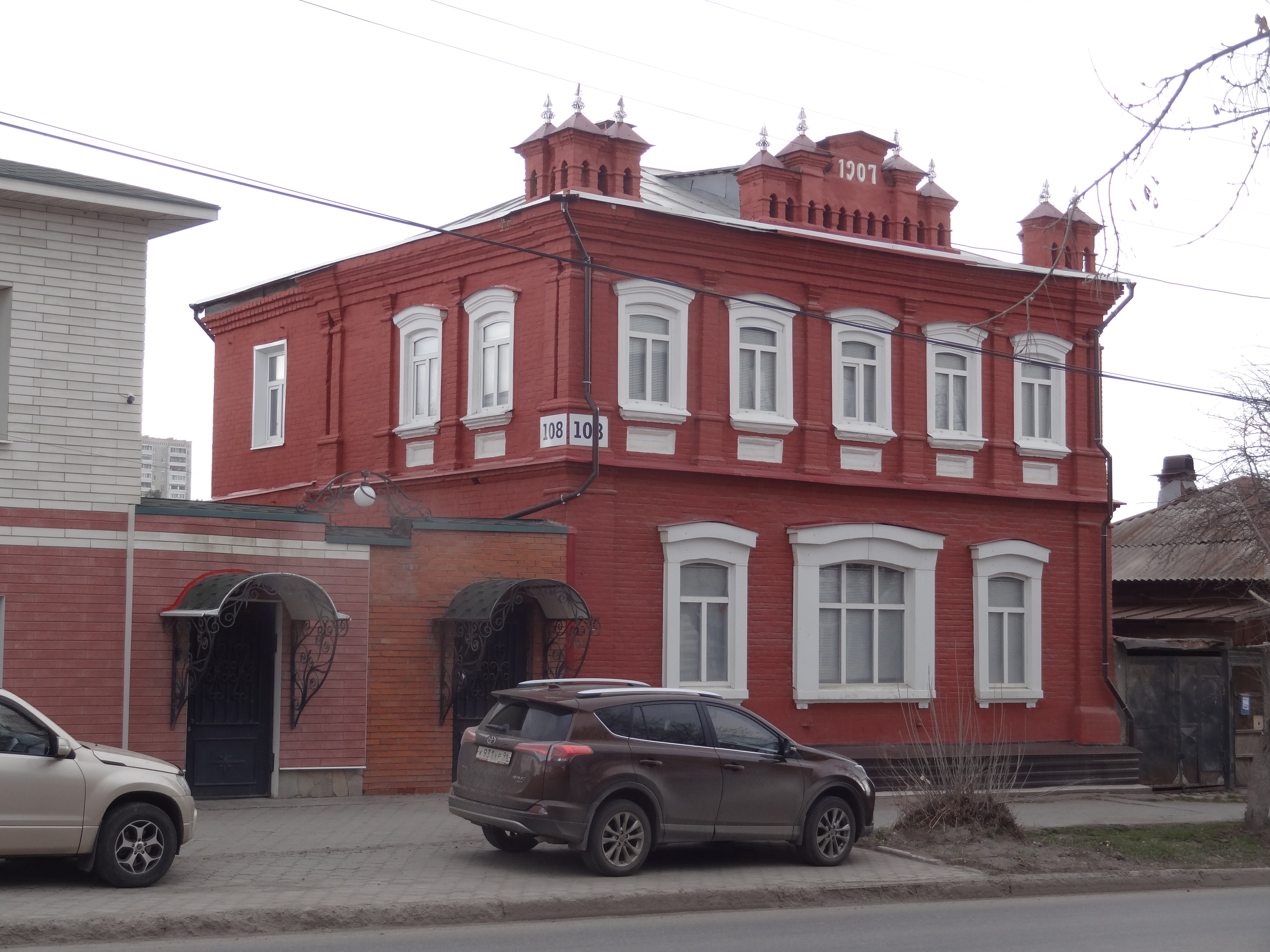
- Interactive map of the Grachev merchants' revenue house area

General information
- Architectural style: Eclecticism
- Location: Kamensk-Uralsky, 108 Lenin Street
- Coordinates: 56°24′59″N 61°53′51″E
- Completed: 1907

Grachev merchants' revenue house is a mansion in the historic center of Kamensk-Uralsky, Sverdlovsk oblast.

The building was granted the status of regional significance on 28 December 2001 (the Sverdlovsk Oblast Government Decree № 859). The object number of cultural heritage of regional significance is 661710794020005.

== History ==
The revenue house belonged to the Grachev family. The owners were father, Vasily Ivanovich, and son, Ivan Vasilyevich. It was built using funds from grain trading.

The building was nationalized in the late 1920s. Later there was a tailor's workshop with available 25 jobs. Subsequently, saving bank, house management and the newspaper edition "Red North" (since 1925 to 1973) were here.

Nowadays the distributing center for libraries functions in the building.

== Architecture ==
The two-storey building is located in the historical center of the old part of the town. The building area is shaped like a rectangle, stretching from north to south. The main southern facade faces Lenin Street (former Bolshaya Moskovskaya Street).

The first floor the brick building was a small drugstore store. Upstairs were living rooms.

The construction of the first floor is typical for shops of the second half of the 19th century. It was a three-part symmetrical scheme: the main entrance to the trading space was in the center, and the shop windows were along the edges of the room.

The mansion is constructed with the elements of eclectism style. The main facade is symmetrical. The corners of the building are set of bossage. The upper part of the building is decorated with double pilasters. On the second floor there are five identical by form windows. Cornice profiled with a wide ledge. The upper part is completed with a two-tiered attic and parapet columns in the form of towers. The towers are decorated with a belt of arched arches. The date of construction "1907" is put down on the inner part of the gable of the house.

== Literature ==
- В.Е. Звагельская, ed. (2008). Свод памятников истории и культуры Свердловской области. Vol. 2. Екатеринбург: Сократ. p. 648. ISBN 978-5-88664-323-7.
- Памятники архитектуры Каменска-Уральского / С. И. Гаврилова, Л. В. Зенкова, А. В. Кузнецова, А. Ю. Лесунова — Екатеринбург: Банк культурной информации, 2008. — 92 с.
