= Molchanov Merchants' Shop =

Architectural monument in Kamensk-Uralsky, Sverdlovsk Oblast, Russia

- Лавка купцов Молчановых
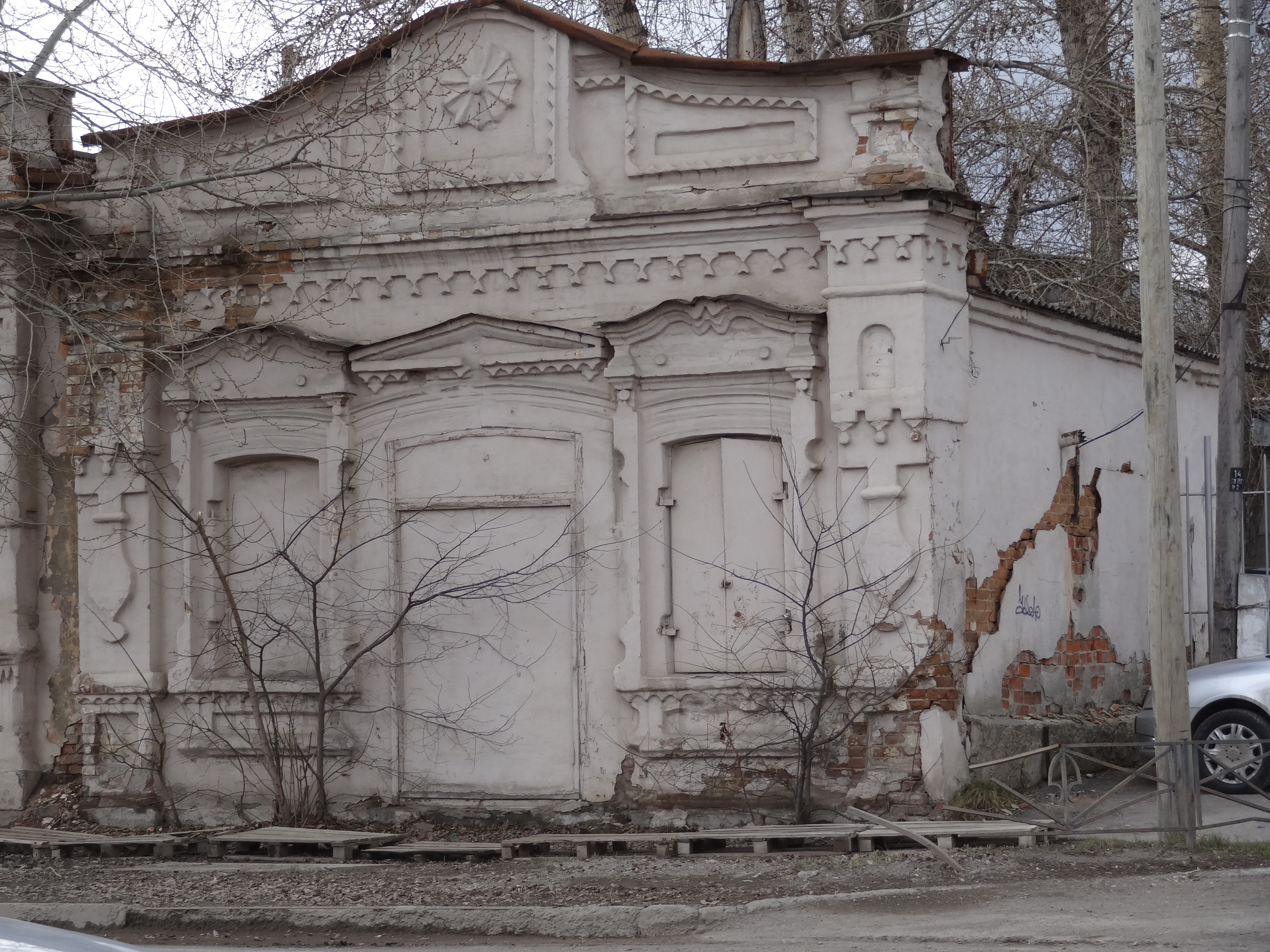
- Interactive map of the Molchanov Merchants' Shop area

General information
- Location: Kamensk-Uralsky, 103A Lenin Street
- Coordinates: 56°24′59″N 61°53′46″E
- Completed: the 19th century

The Molchanov Merchants' Shop is an architectural monument in the historical center of Kamensk-Uralsky, Sverdlovsk oblast, Russia.

The building was granted the status of regional significance on 28 December 2001 (the Government Decree of Sverdlovsk oblast No. 859). The object number of cultural heritage of regional significance is 661710946790005.

== Architecture ==
The shop is a one-story building oriented on a north-south axis. The main northern façade faces Lenin Street. It was constructed at the end of 19th century, and is a good example of architectural brick style.

The front façade has central-axial composition. The corners of the building are set of bossage. The doorway with attics emphasizes the main facade of the building. On each side of the doorway are two windows. Brick architraves are complex formed, framing the windows. The dripstones are similar to baroque decorations. The doorway architraves are decorated with dentals. Underneath the window openings are fielded panels and dentals. The apex of the central part of the building is decorated with a solar sign. The other parts of the monument have simple décor.

== Literature ==
- Bessonova, O. A. (2008). V. E. Zvagelskaya (ed.). Свод памятников истории и культуры Свердловской области [A collection of monuments of history and culture of the Sverdlovsk region] (in Russian). Vol. 2. Ekaterinburg: Сократ. pp. 366–367. ISBN 978-5-88664-323-7.
- Памятники архитектуры Каменска-Уральского / С. И. Гаврилова, Л. В. Зенкова, А. В. Кузнецова, А. Ю. Лесунова — Екатеринбург: Банк культурной информации, 2008. — 92 с.
