= Church of the Intercession of the Most Holy Mother of God, Kamensk-Uralsky =

Orthodox church in Sverdlovsk Oblast, Russia

Church of the Intercession of the Most Holy Mother of God
- Церковь Покрова Пресвятой Богородицы
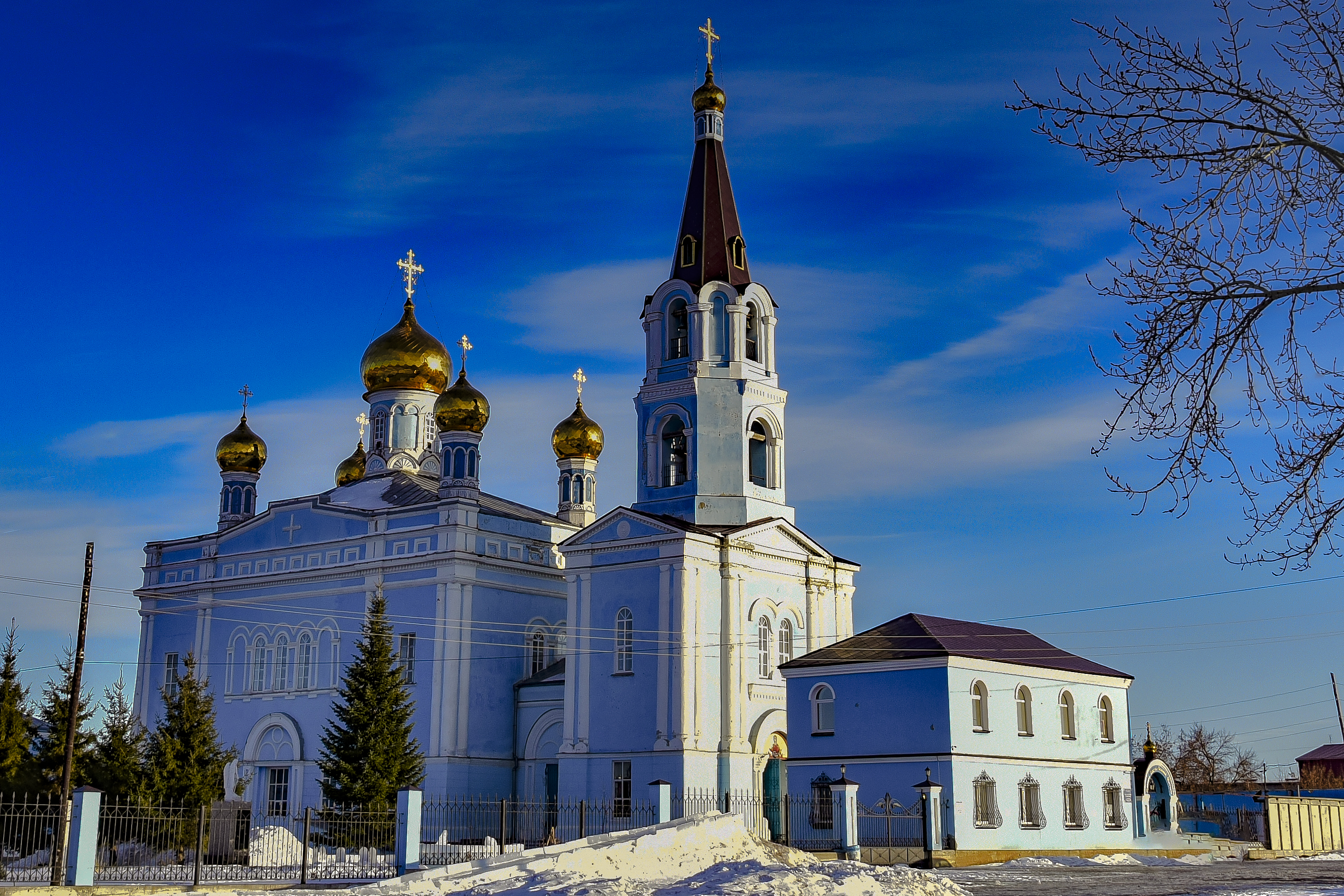
- Interactive map of the Church of the Intercession of the Most Holy Mother of God area

General information
- Location: Kamensk-Uralsky, 45 Revolucionnaya Street
- Coordinates: 56°24′41″N 61°53′40″E
- Completed: 1883

Church of the Intercession of the Most Holy Mother of God is an Orthodox church in Kamensk-Uralsky, Sverdlovsk oblast.

The building was granted the status of regional significance in the 18th of February 1991 (decision № 75 by the executive committee of Sverdlovsk region Council of People's Deputies). The object number of cultural heritage of regional significance is 661710974840005.

== History ==
The church was raised near the town cemetery in the historical part of Kamensk especially for the funeral service. Earlier funeral rites were organised in the Holy Trinity Cathedral. The construction of the church began in the 1850s. It was completed in 1883. The church was consecrated on the 1st of July 1885 by Nathanael, bishop of Yekaterinburg and Irbit. The bell tower was built in 1905. In 1907 the parish was organized.

The church stopped doing funeral rites in 1918. Divine services continued until 1934, when the last priest, Father John Zykov, was arrested. In the 1940s-1950s the building was used as a place of confinement for displaced persons, later as warehouses. The cemetery was demolished.

In 1991 the church building was returned to the Russian Orthodox Church. During the Soviet era the church building became almost destroyed and the domes were lost. John Agafonov became the new arch-priest.

The domes and the main bell tower were restored in 1992. In 1994 the inner mural decoration was made. The parish school for children and adults has been functioning since 1996.

On the 26th of December 2000 Archbishop Vikentius consecrated the new throne and the entire church in the name of the Intercession of the Most Holy Mother of God. The construction of the church building and a library was completed on the territory in 2009. A monument in honor of the 200th anniversary of the Victory in the Patriotic War of 1812 was installed in 2012.

== Architecture ==
The single-altar five-domed church is made of stone with the tented bell tower. The tent bell tower is located in the cemetery church. The church is one of the urban dominants.

== Literature ==
- Свод памятников истории и культуры Свердловской области. Vol. 2. Екатеринбург: Сократ. 2008. p. 648. ISBN 978-5-88664-323-7 – via ред. В.Е.Звагельская.
- «Приходы и церкви Екатеринбургской Епархии». Екатеринбург, 1902 г.
