= Doctor Skvortsov's house =

- Дом врача Скворцова
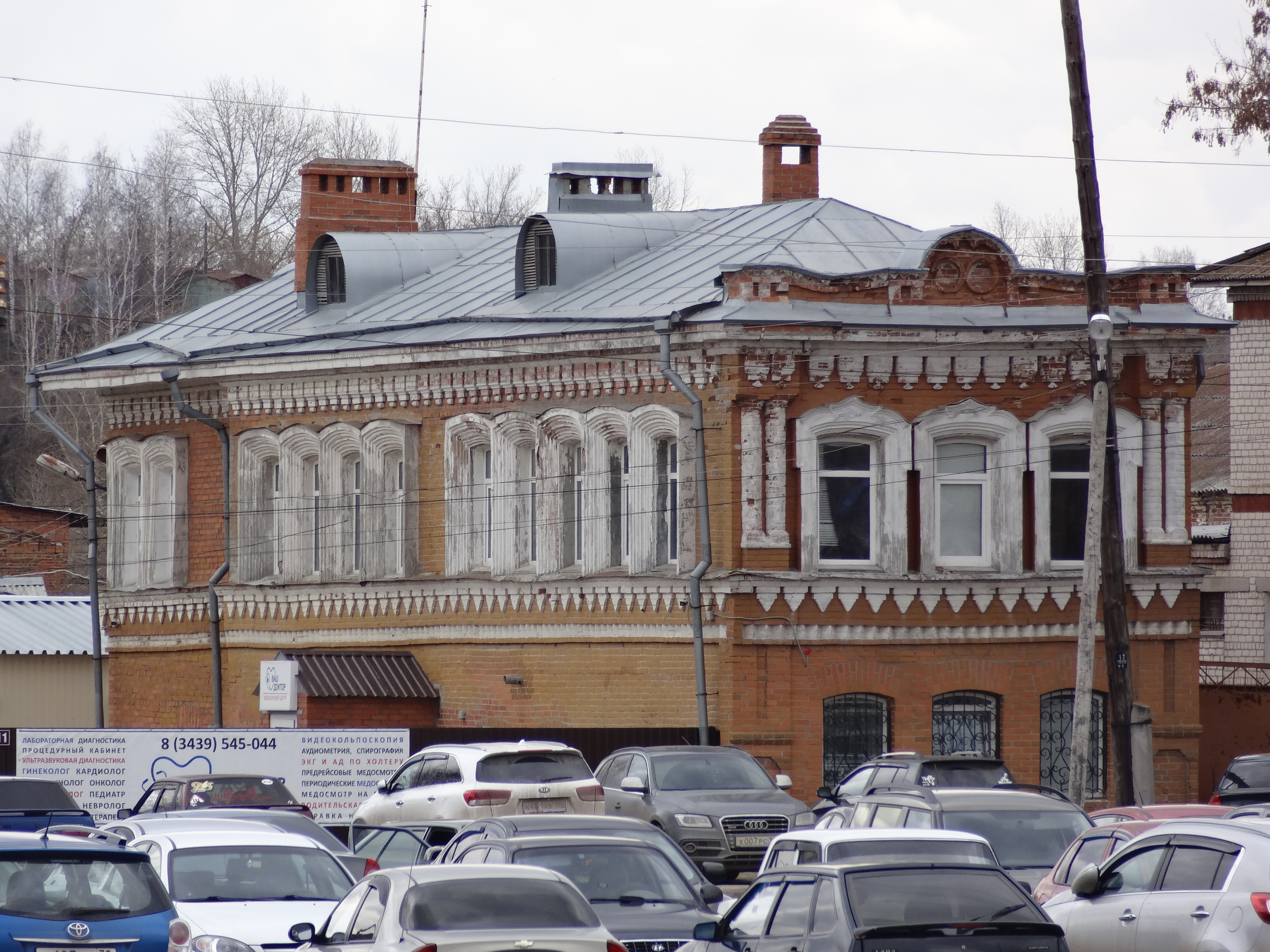
- Interactive map of the Doctor Skvortsov's house area

General information
- Architectural style: Eclecticism
- Location: Kamensk-Uralsky, Revoluycionnaya Street, 11
- Coordinates: 56°25′03″N 61°53′46″E
- Completed: the end of the 20th century

Doctor Skvortsov's house is a mansion in the historic center of Kamensk-Uralsky, Sverdlovsk Oblast.

The building was granted the status of regional significance on 18 February 1991 (decision No. 75 by the executive committee of Sverdlovsk Oblast Council of People's Deputies). The object number of cultural heritage of regional significance is 661710794010005.

== History ==
The mansion was built at the end of 19th century, and contained a shop on the first floor with living quarters above. The original owner was a Kamensk merchant named Sbitnev.

The mansion was named after its second owner, Vasily Skvortsov. As a young specialist, Skvortsov moved to Kamensk after graduating from Tomsk Medical University. While working in the local hospital, he lived in Sbitnev's house.

Later, he married Sbitnev's daughter and received the mansion as a part of her dowry. In 1917, he headed the Kamensk Executive Committee.

In the late 1930s, he was arrested and shot. The property was nationalized. Afterwards, the building was used by different firms and offices, including the Kamensk department of the KGB.

The building burnt down in 1991. However, the mansion was reconstructed and is still in use.

== Architecture ==
The main western facade faces Revoluycionnaya Street. The building area is shaped like a rectangle, stretching from west to east. The mansion forms part of the southern border of the Cathedral Square. It is harmoniously located among the buildings. The foundation is made of quarry stone and the walls are brick. Decorative elements are made of figured brick. The main architectural style is eclecticism with elements of brick lace.

On the first floor there was a shop, and on the second floor were living quarters. The decoration of the top floor differs from the lower one by three window axes. Fences, window sills, corner walls and frieze are made of decorative bricks. All the windows are surrounded by a wide border. The northern and eastern facades are decorated more simply, but in the same style and with the same elements. On the eastern facade there is a wide entrance opening.

== Literature ==
- В.Е.Звагельская, ed. (2008). Свод памятников истории и культуры Свердловской области. Vol. 2. Екатеринбург: Сократ. p. 648. ISBN 978-5-88664-323-7.
- Памятники архитектуры Каменска-Уральского / С. И. Гаврилова, Л. В. Зенкова, А. В. Кузнецова, А. Ю. Лесунова — Екатеринбург: Банк культурной информации, 2008. — 92 с.

== Sources ==
- Неизвестный Каменск, серия 2 (Каменск Купеческий) on YouTube
