= Zyryanov manor house =

- Усадьба купцов Зыряновых
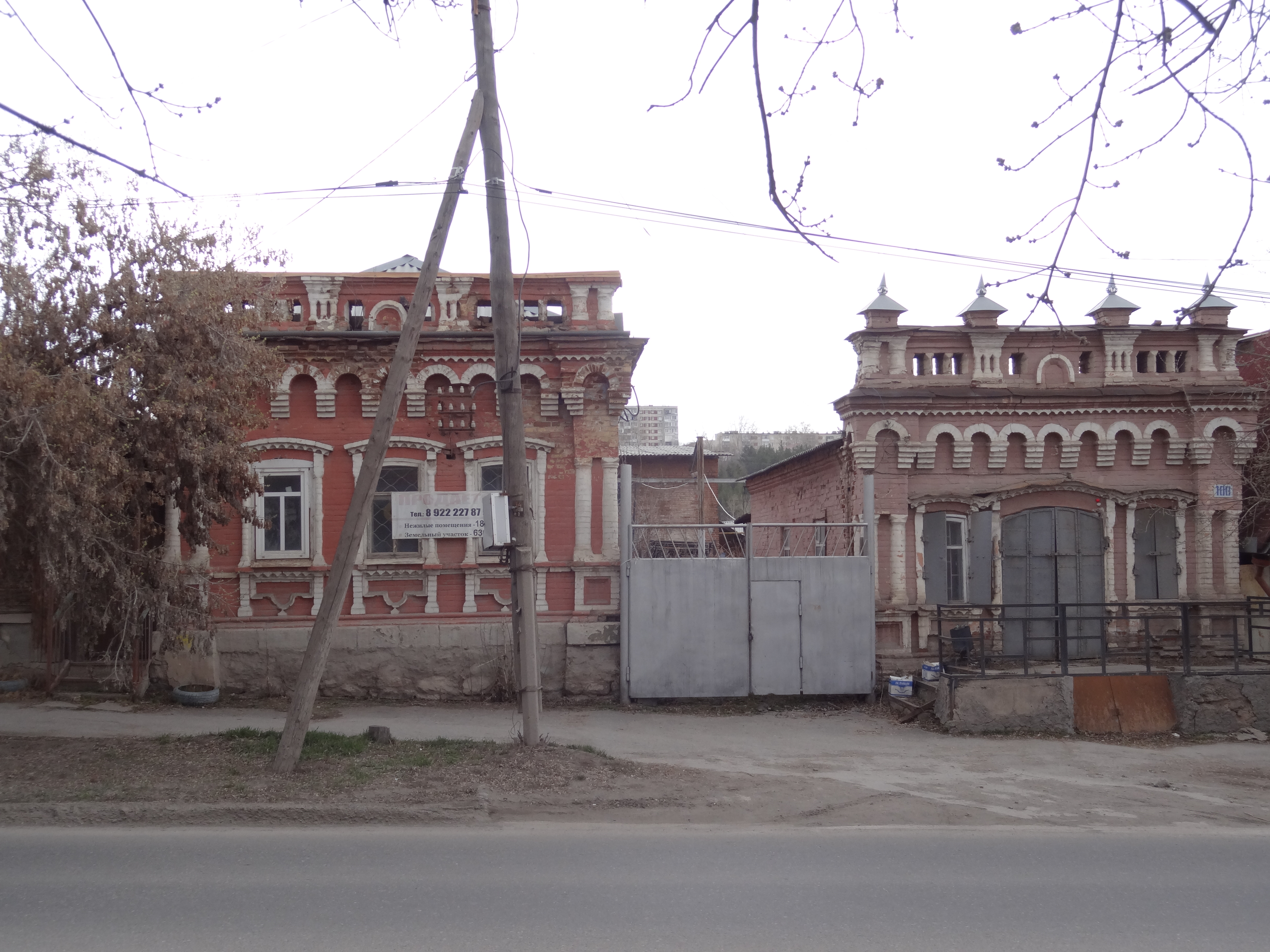
- Interactive map of the Zyryanov manor house area

General information
- Location: Kamensk-Uralsky, 100, 102 Lenin Street
- Coordinates: 56°24′59″N 61°53′54″E
- Completed: 1870

Zyryanov manor house is located in the historical center of Kamensk-Uralsky, Sverdlovsk oblast.

The building was granted the status of regional significance on 28 December 2001 (the Sverdlovsk oblast Government Decree No. 859). The object number of cultural heritage of regional significance is 661720976380005.

== History ==
The construction of the Kamensk manor has been dated at 1870. The owner of the mansion was one of the descendants of Peter Zyryanov. Zyryanov was descended from a trading dynasty, whose name was famous in the Ural region. The earliest mention of the name dates back to the 16th century.

Peter Zyryanov held the post of burgomaster of the Yekaterinburg City Hall in 1765–1770. In 1767, he was elected as the head of the city. Most of the family was engaged in ore mining and commercial activities.

Three buildings survived on the land until contemporary times: a residential house, a shop and a storage room.

== Architecture ==
All buildings are constructed with the elements of eclecticism style.

The manor house is integrated into in the line development of the block. It has a rectangular form of the area extended in its depth. The residential building and shop form the front western and eastern borders respectively. The southern main facades of the residential house and the shop face Lenin Street (former Bolshaya Moskovskaya Street). The buildings are separated by wide gates to the courtyard.

The two-storey rectangular brick house is set on a quarried stone foundation stretching from north to south. The walls are made of solid bricks. The veneer is done with circle and front bricks. The southern facade has three window axes and completed with a stepped friso, decorated with an arcaded frieze with a principal cornice and a barrier wall. The composition of the facade is symmetrical. The corners of the facade are presented as paired classic half-columns. The window surrounds are also decorated with semicolumns and crests. The main entrance is on the side of the eastern facade. The roof is four-pitched, but is not visible from the street, as it is obscured by an attic structure of complex shape. An external gutter system allowed rain and melted snow to drain away from the roof. The decorative elements of the other facades remained. The interior features sloped surfaces and ceiling rosettes.

The one-storey shop is brick with a rectangular shape. ←The main facade has a symmetrical composition, in keeping with the main entrance. Located in the center, are a high stone porch and two side windows. The architectural and decorative elements of a typical residential house still remain.

== Literature ==
- ред. В.Е.Звагельская (2008). Свод памятников истории и культуры Свердловской области. Vol. 2. Екатеринбург: Сократ. p. 648. ISBN 978-5-88664-323-7.
- Памятники архитектуры Каменска-Уральского / С. И. Гаврилова, Л. В. Зенкова, А. В. Кузнецова, А. Ю. Лесунова — Екатеринбург: Банк культурной информации, 2008. — 92 с.
