= Men's College building, Kamensk-Uralsky =

Men's College building
- Здание каменского мужского училища
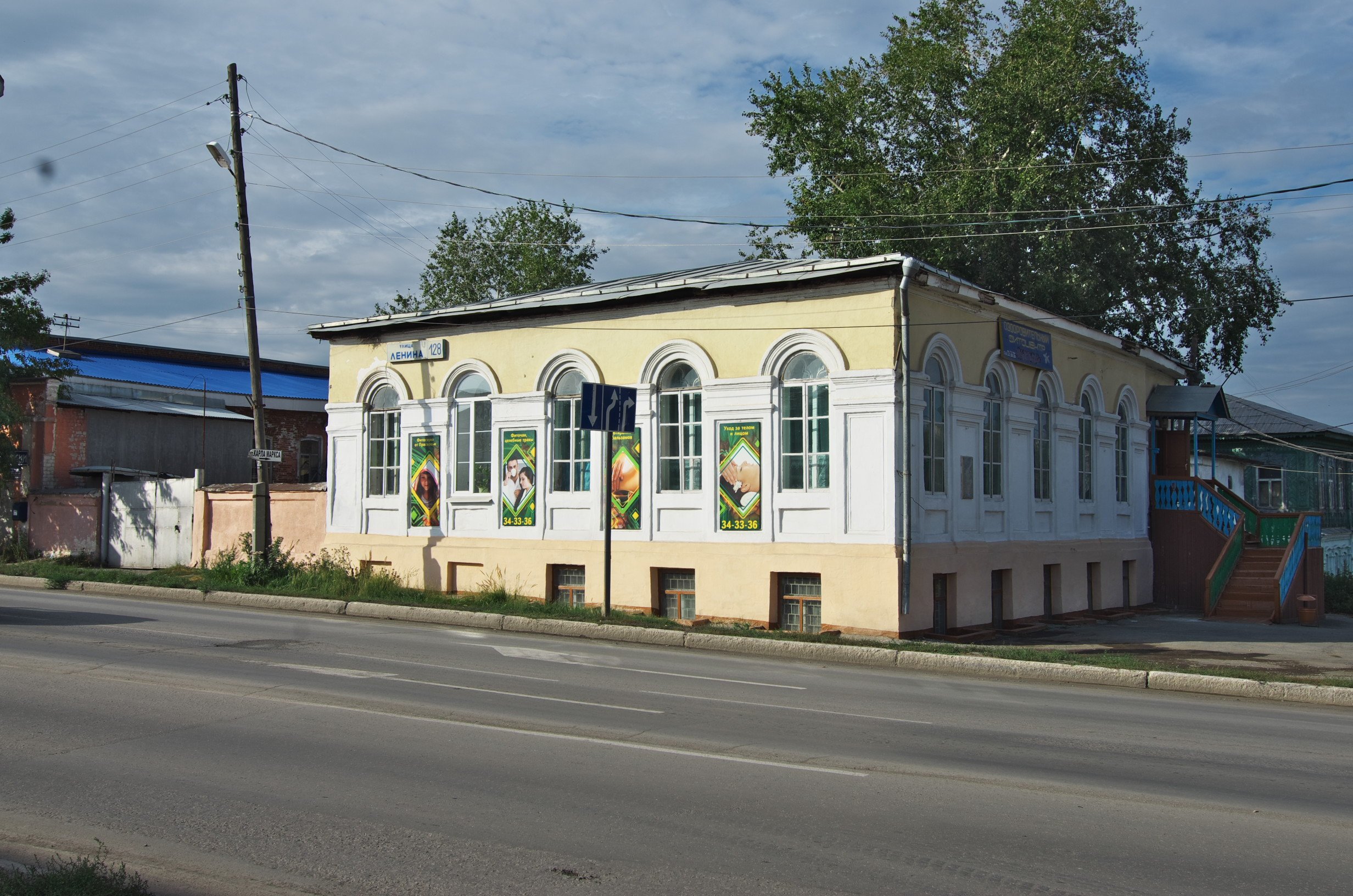
- Interactive map of the Men's College building area

General information
- Location: Kamensk-Uralsky, 128 Lenin Street
- Coordinates: 56°25′05″N 61°53′25″E
- Completed: the middle of the 19th century

The Men's College building is a mansion in the historical center of Kamensk-Uralsky, Sverdlovsk oblast.

The building was granted the status of regional significance on 28 December 2001 (the Sverdlovsk oblast Government Decree № 859). The object number of cultural heritage of regional significance is 661710946880005.

== Architecture ==
The mansion was built in the middle of the 19th century. There is no data about the author of the construction project. So-called "exemplary facades" are typical for buildings of Russian cities in the first half of the 19th century.

The one-story mansion is on a corner of Lenin Street (former Bolshaya Moskovskaya) and Communisticheskoy molodeji. The house has a square form.

The southern facade faces Lenin Street. It is divided into five window axes. The windows of the basement are rectangular with no window surroundings. The windows of the second floor are semicircular in the upper part. They organise a simple metric line in the frame within a profiled archivolt. The space under the windows is decorated with rectangular raised panels as the space between windows.

The eastern façade faces Communisticheskoy molodeji Street. There is also the main entrance to the building. A tall wooden porch with a wooden fence and a wooden visor on the supports leads to the building. On the western facade, the composition of the windows is changed and they are arranged in pairs. The decoration is the same as in the facades. The facade served as a firewall therefore it is a blank form wall.

== Literature ==
- В.Е.Звагельская, ed. (2008). Свод памятников истории и культуры Свердловской области. Vol. 2. Екатеринбург: Сократ. p. 648. ISBN 978-5-88664-323-7.
- Памятники архитектуры Каменска-Уральского / С. И. Гаврилова, Л. В. Зенкова, А. В. Кузнецова, А. Ю. Лесунова — Екатеринбург: Банк культурной информации, 2008. — 92 с.
