= Orphanage building, Kamensk-Uralsky =

Orphanage in Sverdlovsk Oblast, Russia

Orphanage building
- Здание детского приюта
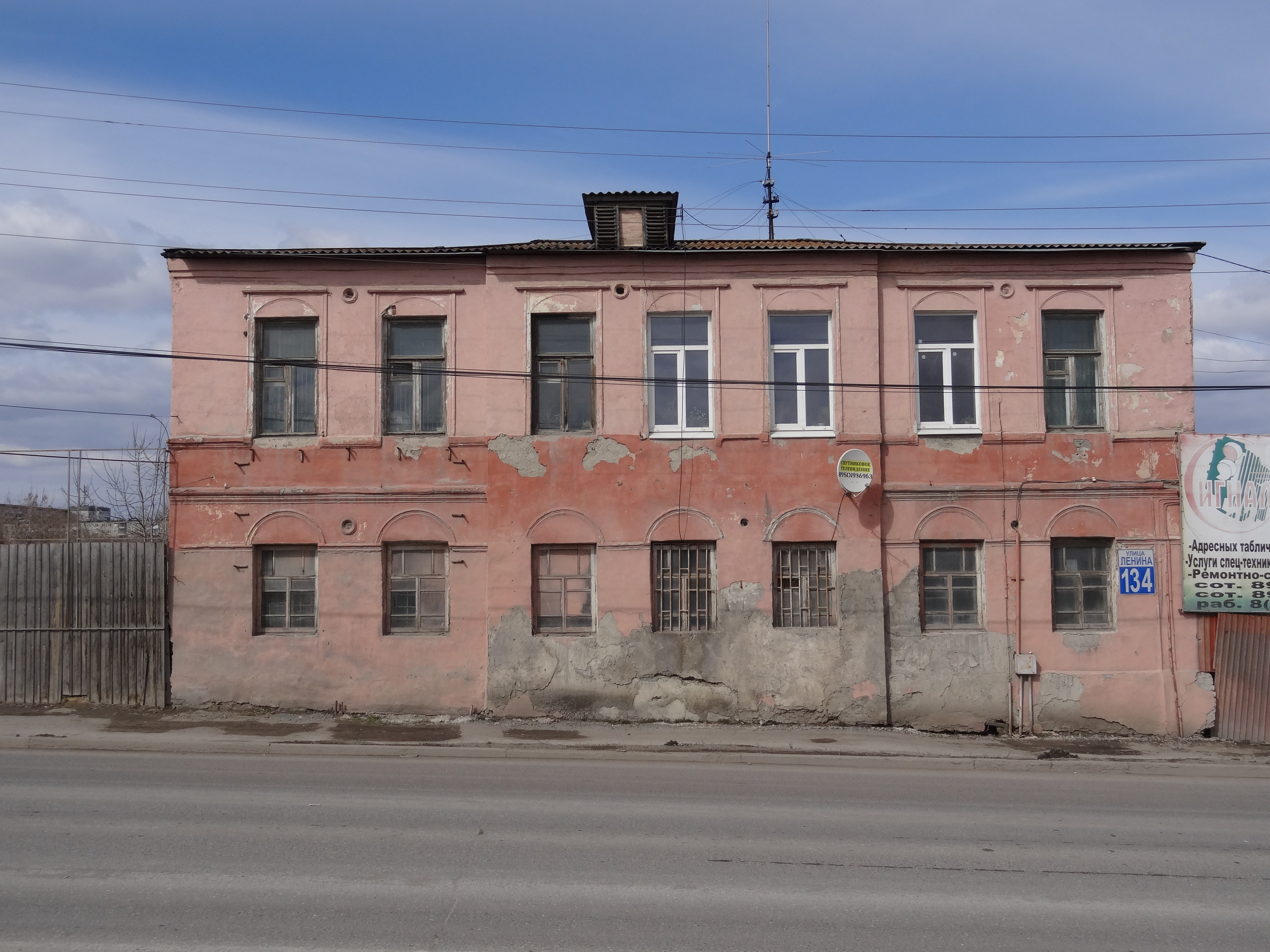
- Interactive map of the Orphanage building area

General information
- Architectural style: Classicism
- Location: Kamensk-Uralsky
- Coordinates: 56°25′04″N 61°53′20″E
- Completed: the end of the 19th century

The previous orphanage building is located in the historical center of Kamensk-Uralsky, Sverdlovsk oblast.

The building was granted the status of regional significance on 28 December 2001 (the Sverdlovsk Oblast Government Decree № 859). The object number of cultural heritage of regional significance is 661710946770005.

== Architecture ==
The two-storey stone building has square form. It is integrated in the line building of the block. The main southern facade faces Lenin Street (the former Bolshaya Moskovskaya Street).

The southern facade is symmetrical. The risalit with three window axes is in the central part of the building. The sides are horizontally divided by the basement. There are also thrusts and interfloor cornice. The upper part of the facade is also completed by the cornice. The number of windows is odd numbered. The top of the window are decorated with a profile for archivolt. Window openings are decorated with dripstones on the second floor. The decoration of the eastern facade is the same as the main facade, with the exception of the annex from the northeast corner. The annex and the other facades are decorated simply.

== Literature ==
- В.Е.Звагельская, ed. (2008). Свод памятников истории и культуры Свердловской области. Vol. 2. Екатеринбург: Сократ. p. 648. ISBN 978-5-88664-323-7.
- Памятники архитектуры Каменска-Уральского / С. И. Гаврилова, Л. В. Зенкова, А. В. Кузнецова, А. Ю. Лесунова — Екатеринбург: Банк культурной информации, 2008. — 92 с.

== Sources ==
- Неизвестный Каменск, серия 2 (Каменск Купеческий) on YouTube
