= Tronin's House =

Mansion in Kamensk-Uralsky, Russia

Tronin’s house
- Дом Тронина
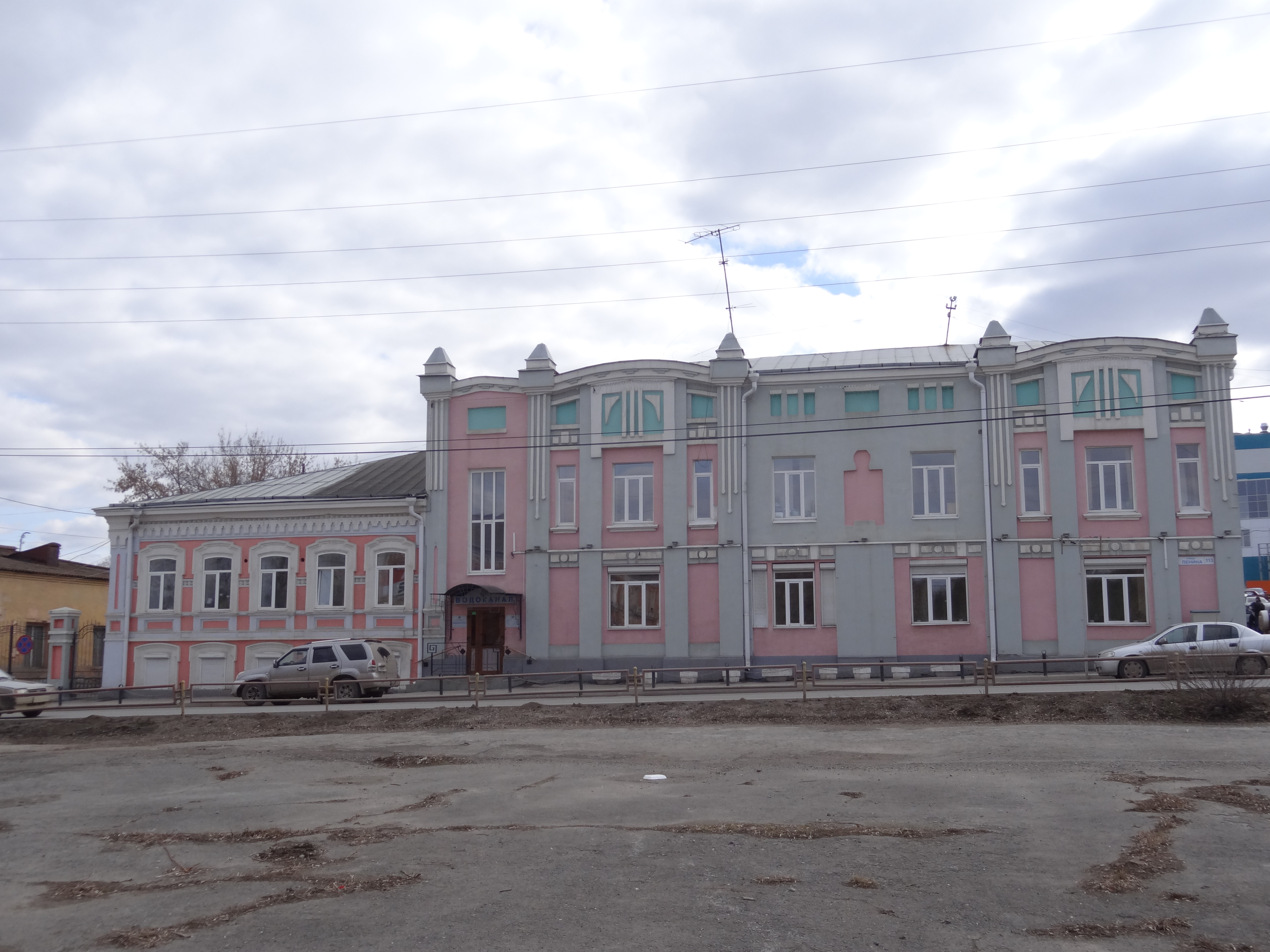
- Interactive map of the Tronin’s house area

General information
- Location: Kamensk-Uralsky, 113 Lenin Street
- Coordinates: 56°25′00″N 61°53′36″E
- Completed: 1910

Tronin’s house is a mansion located in Kamensk-Uralsky, Sverdlovsk oblast.

The building was granted the status of regional significance on 28 December 2001 (the Government Decree of Sverdlovsk oblast № 859). The object number of cultural heritage of regional significance is 661720976330005.

== Architecture ==
The mansion’s owner was Kamensk bourgeois Arsenyi Tronin. He made his fortune in hardware. In 1910 he built the mansion for his family. It is one of the first Modern style buildings with the elements of false gothic style and brick lace. The two-story building is located in the historic center of the town. The main northern façade faces Lenin Street. The facade is divided into four parts by false columns-blades, five of which end in decorative columns in the form of small towers. The central window is wider than the rest. The space above it is decorated with a brick pattern without a single straight line. On both sides are narrower windows. The whole facade is glazed with a vertical belt. Decorative edging with geometric patterns divides the building into floors.

On the second floor there must be a wide balcony. The project provided for the third floor, but his master did not have time to complete it. The windows of the third floor are greatly understated. In 1927 they were tightly laid.

Initially, there was only one central entrance to the building, through the porch the guests entered the hallway with a small corridor. Directly there was a staircase to the second floor. The house was water heating, units and oven were located in a specially constructed boiler house. To the eastern facade was attached a hardware store, one of the largest in the Kamensk Plant.

== History ==
After the revolutionary events of 1917, the mansion was nationalized. In the 1930s, the building was partially rebuilt for public needs. Subsequently, a rough restoration was carried out, and the walls were built of solid and literal bricks, were plastered. The building was occupied by various organizations: the Consumer Society, the Bureau of Technical Inventory, the Employment Bureau, now the building houses the local JSC "Vodokanal".

== Literature ==
- В.Е.Звагельская, ed. (2008). Свод памятников истории и культуры Свердловской области. Vol. 2. Екатеринбург: Сократ. p. 648. ISBN 978-5-88664-323-7.
- Памятники архитектуры Каменска-Уральского / С. И. Гаврилова, Л. В. Зенкова, А. В. Кузнецова, А. Ю. Лесунова — Екатеринбург: Банк культурной информации, 2008. — 92 с.
