= The House where the Soviet Power was Proclaimed, Kamensk-Uralsky =

The house where the Soviet Power was proclaimed
- Здание, в котором была провозглашена Советская власть
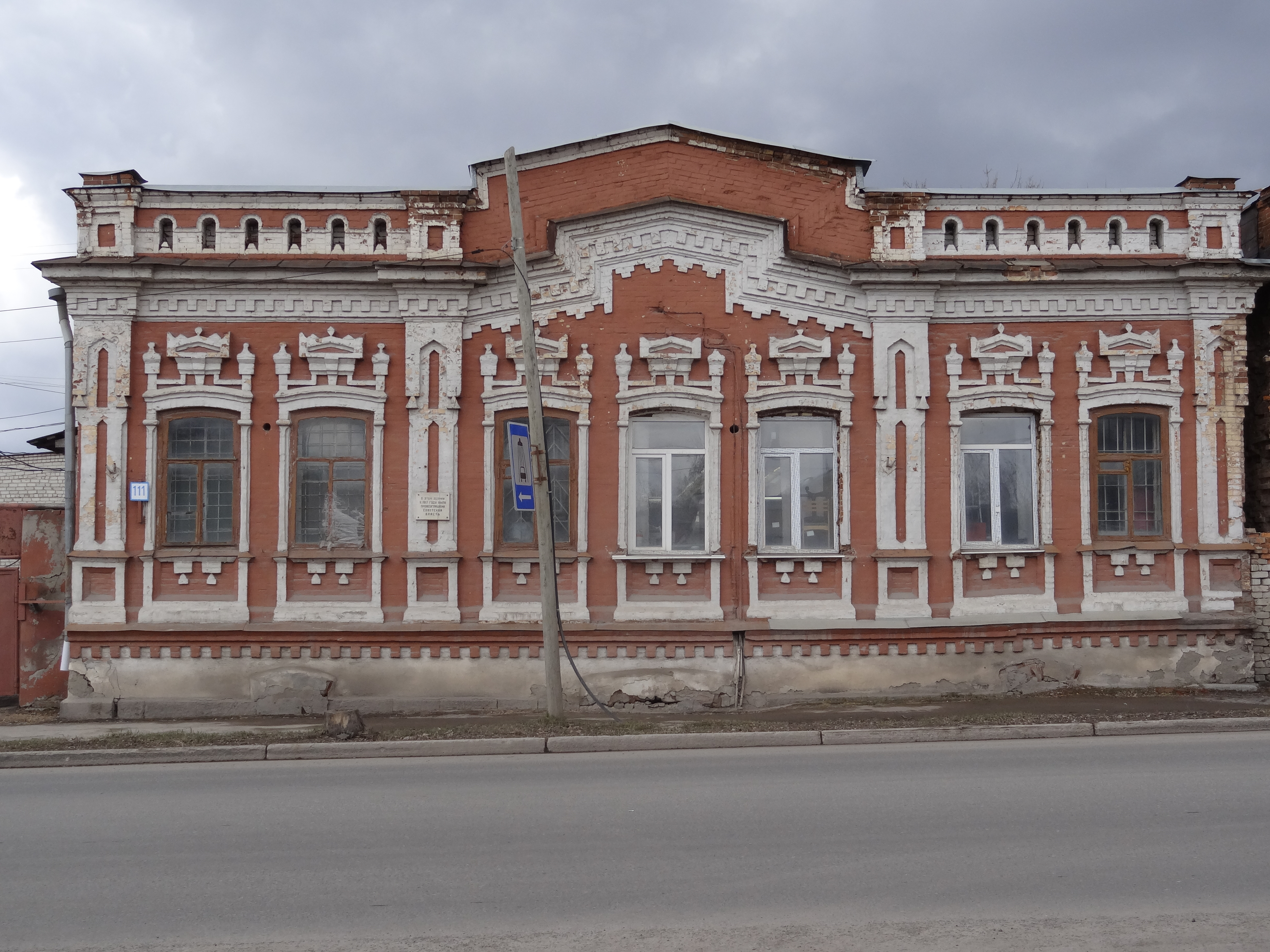
- Interactive map of the The house where the Soviet Power was proclaimed area

General information
- Location: Kamensk-Uralsky, 111 Lenina Street
- Coordinates: 56°25′00″N 61°53′39″E
- Completed: 1890s

The house where the Soviet Power was proclaimed is a mansion in the historical center of Kamensk-Uralsky, Sverdlovsk Oblast.

The building was granted the status of regional significance on 28 December 2001 (the Sverdlovsk Oblast Government Decree No. 859). The object number of cultural heritage of regional significance is 661710974820005.

== Architecture ==
A one-storey brick building bases on a low quarried stone foundationon. It is located in the historical part of the town with high building density. This area was actively built up by merchants' shop buildings and residential houses during the second half of the 19th century. The main northern facade faces the red line of Lenin Street. On the right side of the mansion is a one-story brick store building. The two buildings forms the single solid facade. The narrow-arranged window openings is determined by their symmetrical grouping. Large tall windows with a lace bridge decorated with elegant surrounds with an elongated bottom frame and a complicated arch form solemnized the house. Pilaster-strips at the corners of the facade and in the piers between the windows are decorated with a figured patterned brick arrangement. The crowning facade of the multi-layered cornice with the teeth is unscrewed by the pilasters.

The original symmetrical composition of the eastern front facade didn't remain. It is decorated with six evenly spaced windows. In the central part of the building is a doorway and a six-step high front porch set in front of it with rails on four pillars and a single-pitched roof. On all courtyard facades the windows are much more modest than street ones. Windows frame surrounds with ledges and arched dripstones. On the main facade is attached a marble memorial plaque: "In 1917 the Soviet power was proclaimed in this building". The size of the plaque is 50x50 cm. The signature is covered with bronze paint.

== Literature ==
- В.Е.Звагельская, ed. (2008). Свод памятников истории и культуры Свердловской области. Vol. 2. Екатеринбург: Сократ. p. 648. ISBN 978-5-88664-323-7.
- Памятники архитектуры Каменска-Уральского / С. И. Гаврилова, Л. В. Зенкова, А. В. Кузнецова, А. Ю. Лесунова — Екатеринбург: Банк культурной информации, 2008. — 92 с.
