= Russian Railway Palace of Culture, Kamensk-Uralsky =

Russian Railway Palace of Culture
- Дворец культуры железнодорожников
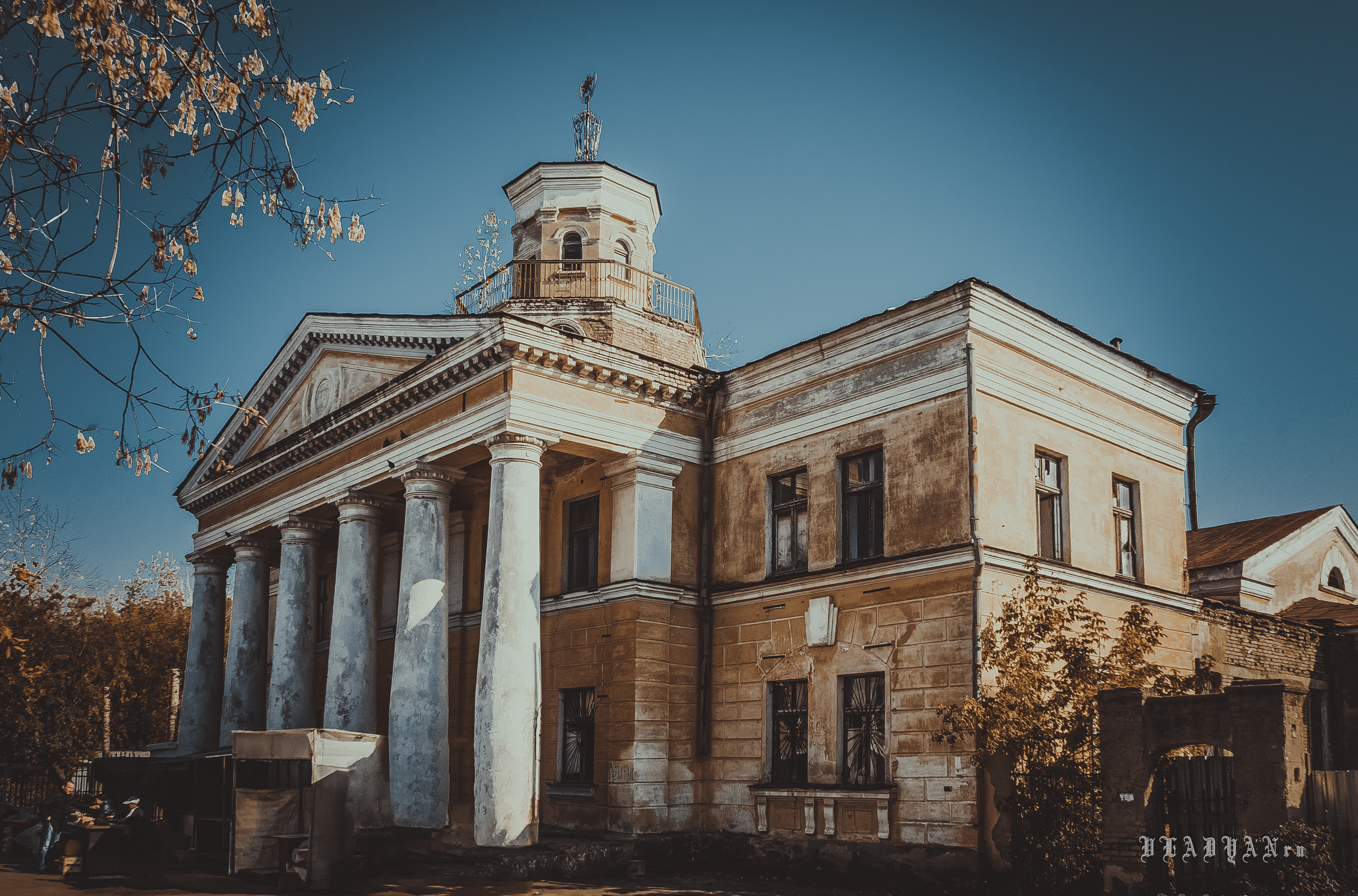
- Interactive map of the Russian Railway Palace of Culture area

General information
- Location: Kamensk-Uralsky, 2 Parovoznikov Street
- Coordinates: 56°25′21″N 61°55′18″E
- Completed: 1954

The Russian Railway Palace of Culture is a building in Kamensk-Uralsky, Sverdlovsk oblast.

The building was granted the status of regional significance on 28 December 2001 (the Sverdlovsk Oblast Government Decree № 859). The object number of cultural heritage of regional significance is 661710794000005.

== Architecture ==
The building is located in the Sinarsky district of the city, at the beginning of the Parovoznikov street. The stone building with three-part development of the plan has a central-axial volumetric-spatial solution and is related to the depth of the square with the area on which its main north-western facade is facing.

The main façade – with a six-column portico of a large Tuscan warrant on a pedestal, a risalite with two-tier pilasters of the same order – is symmetrical. The portico is crowned by an entablature with a smooth frieze and a triangular pediment, whose timbre is decorated with a frame ornament.

Three-part division of the north-eastern facade includes paired windows of administrative floors, four enlarged windows of the lobby with narrow piers and windows of auxiliary rooms. The volumes of the auditorium and the stage were revealed on the facades with an attic with semicircular windows in tympana above the uncovered cornice. Timpana are decorated with profiled archivolts with a lock stone.

The facade is divided horizontally by the base and attic. Attic is decorated with arched eyebrows, located on the axes of the window and doorways of the hall. The south-west facade is identical to the north-east facade, but has on the first floor of the administrative part the entrance to the building and five windows of the auxiliary premises.

Door portals of the main and side entrances are covered with profiled reliefs, the lintels are framed ornament. Over the lintels are placed direct door sandrics on the brackets. Echines of columns decorated with ionics, cornices of entablature and gable - crackers.

== Literature ==
- В.Е.Звагельская, ed. (2008). Свод памятников истории и культуры Свердловской области. Vol. 2. Екатеринбург: Сократ. p. 648. ISBN 978-5-88664-323-7.
- Памятники архитектуры Каменска-Уральского / С. И. Гаврилова, Л. В. Зенкова, А. В. Кузнецова, А. Ю. Лесунова — Екатеринбург: Банк культурной информации, 2008. — 92 с.
