= Volchkov =

Volchkov, feminine: Volchkova (Russian: Волчков/Волчкова) is a Russian surname. The origin comes from "волк", wolf. A transliteration variant is Voltchkov.

Notable people with the surname include:

- Alexander Volchkov (jurist) (1902–1978), Russian judge
- Alexander Volchkov (ice hockey, born 1952), Soviet ice hockey player
- Alexander Volchkov (ice hockey, born 1977), Russian ice hockey player
- Olga Volchkova (born 1970), Russian-born American painter
- Sergei Volchkov (Russian Academy of Sciences) (1707—1773) Russian printer and translator
- Sergei Volchkov (singer), winner of The Voice
- Viktoria Volchkova (born 1982), Russian figure skater and coach
- Vladimir Voltchkov (born 1978), Belarusian tennis player
