= Konstantin Volkov =

Konstantin Volkov may refer to:

- Konstantin Volkov (pole vaulter) (born 1960), retired pole vaulter who represented the USSR
- Konstantin Volkov (ice hockey, born 1985), Russian professional ice hockey player
- Konstantin Volkov (ice hockey, born 1997), Russian professional ice hockey goaltender
- Konstantin Volkov (diplomat) (died 1945), NKVD agent and would-be defector
- Konstantin Valkov, a Russian former cosmonaut
