= 36 Krasnykh Orlov Street, Kamensk-Uralsky =

36 Krasnykh Orlov Street
- 36 дом по улице Красных Орлов
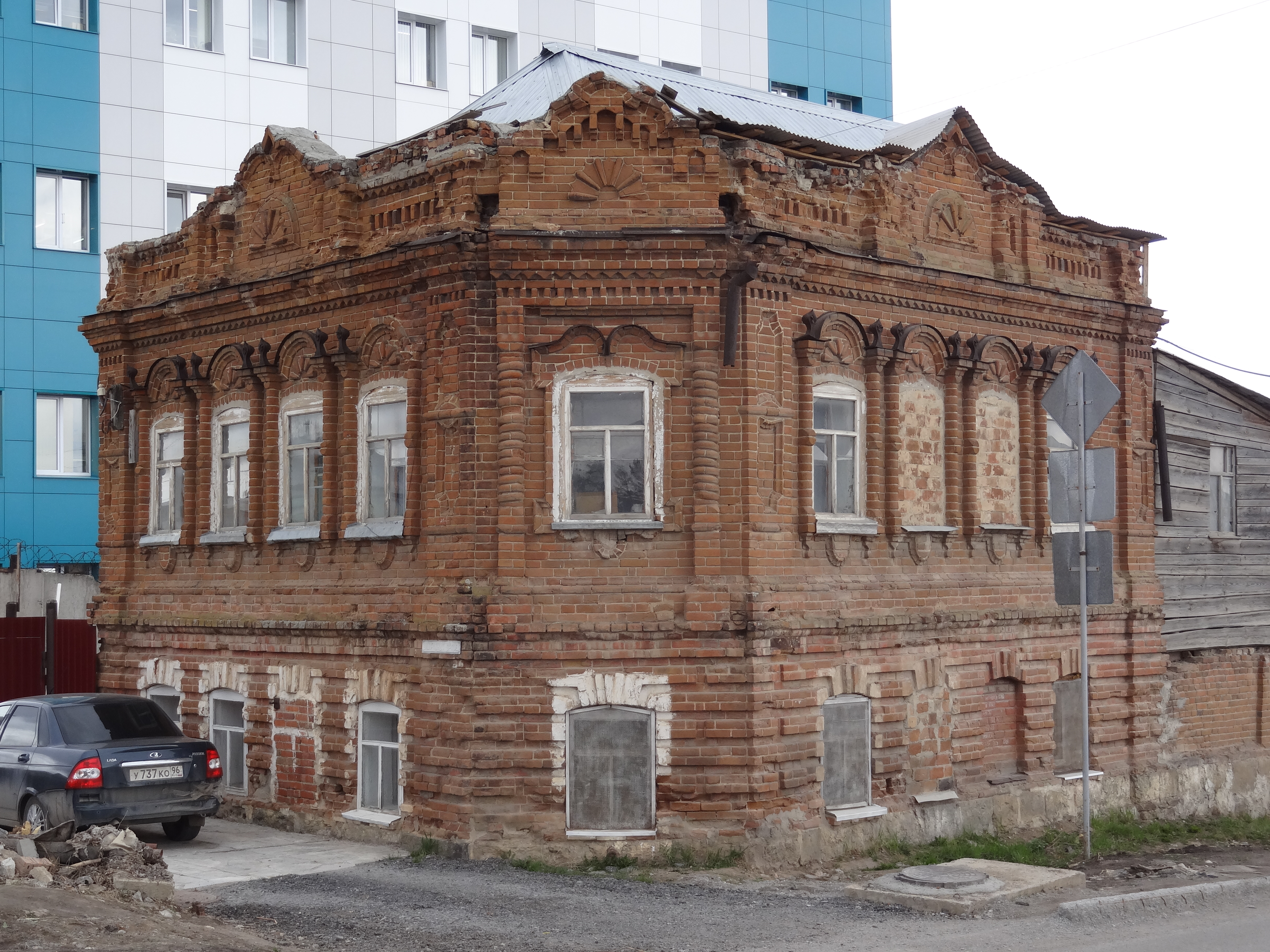
- Interactive map of the 36 Krasnykh Orlov Street area

General information
- Architectural style: Eclecticism
- Location: Kamensk-Uralsky, 36 Krasnykh Orlov Street
- Coordinates: 56°24′51″N 61°53′37″E
- Completed: the end of the 19th century

36 Krasnykh Orlov Street is a mansion in the historical center of Kamensk-Uralsky, Sverdlovsk Oblast.

The building was granted the status of regional significance on 28 December 2001 (the Sverdlovsk Oblast Government Decree № 859).

== Architecture ==
The building is located on the intersection of Revolucionnaya and Krasnykh Orlov Streets (the former Verkhnaya Novaya). Revolucionnaya Street directly leads to the Church of the Intercession and the town cemetery.

The mansion was built in the late 19th century. The two-story building is square except for a narrow 1-window-wide fifth wall between the eastern and southern facades which faces the intersection. Visually, this wall is the center of the mansion. The eastern and southern facades are identical and evoke symmetry. For each facade there are four windows on both floors.

Eclecticism and classical and modernist styles stand out. The exterior walls are made of brick with bright trim. Patterns are made of red brick. Attic is continuous throughout the walls (??). On the south and south-east sides in the center of the attic there is a six-petalled sun. Above him stretched a curved edging that unites the walls into a common composition. Below is laid a brick cornice with rectangular notches - "breadcrumbs". The window openings are crowned by a rounded beam end. Each window is generously decorated with sandricks with a pommel of a pair of arcs. All the walls except the southeast are completed with shoulder blades in shape similar to rectangular columns. The middle wall is surrounded by semicircular pilasters. The western and northern courtyard facades are decorated more modestly, there is no attic, the number of windows is reduced to two. The windows are made without decoration. The foundation is high on rubble stone.

There is no data about the owner of the building or the architect.

== Literature ==
- "Свод памятников истории и культуры Свердловской области". Vol. 2. Екатеринбург: Сократ. ред. В.Е.Звагельская. 2008. p. 648. ISBN 978-5-88664-323-7.
- Памятники архитектуры Каменска-Уральского / С. И. Гаврилова, Л. В. Зенкова, А. В. Кузнецова, А. Ю. Лесунова — Екатеринбург: Банк культурной информации, 2008. — 92 с.
