= Alexandre Volkoff =

Alexandre Volkoff (Wolkoff) may refer to:

- Alexander Wolkoff-Muromtsev (1844–1928, signed as A. N. Roussoff), Russian botanist and painter; see Palazzo Barbaro Wolkoff
- Alexandre Volkoff (actor) (1885–1942), Russian actor, screenwriter and film director

== See also ==
- Alexander Volkov (disambiguation)
