= Sergei Volchkov =

Sergei Volchkov may refer to:

- Sergei Volchkov (singer) (born 1988), Russian singer of Belarusian origin
- Sergei Volchkov (Russian Academy of Sciences) (1707–1773), Russian printer, lexicographer, translator, and president of the Russian Academy of Sciences
