= Sergey Volkov =

Sergey Volkov may refer to:

- Sergei Volkov (footballer, born 1980), Russian football player
- Sergey Volkov (footballer, born 1995), Russian football player
- Sergey Volkov (footballer, born 1999), Belarusian football player
- Sergei Volkov (footballer, born 2002), Russian football player
- Sergey Volkov (cosmonaut) (born 1973), Russian cosmonaut
- Sergey Volkov (figure skater) (1949–1990), Soviet figure skater
- Sergey Volkov (chess player) (born 1974), Russian chess grandmaster
- Sergey Volkov (skier) (born 1987), Russian freestyle skier
- Sabbas (or Savva; born Sergey Aleksandrovich Volkov) (born 1958), bishop of the Moldovan Orthodox Church

== See also ==
- Sergei Volchkov (disambiguation)
