= Konstantin Valkov =

Russian former Cosmonaut (born 1971)

Konstantin Anatolyevich Valkov
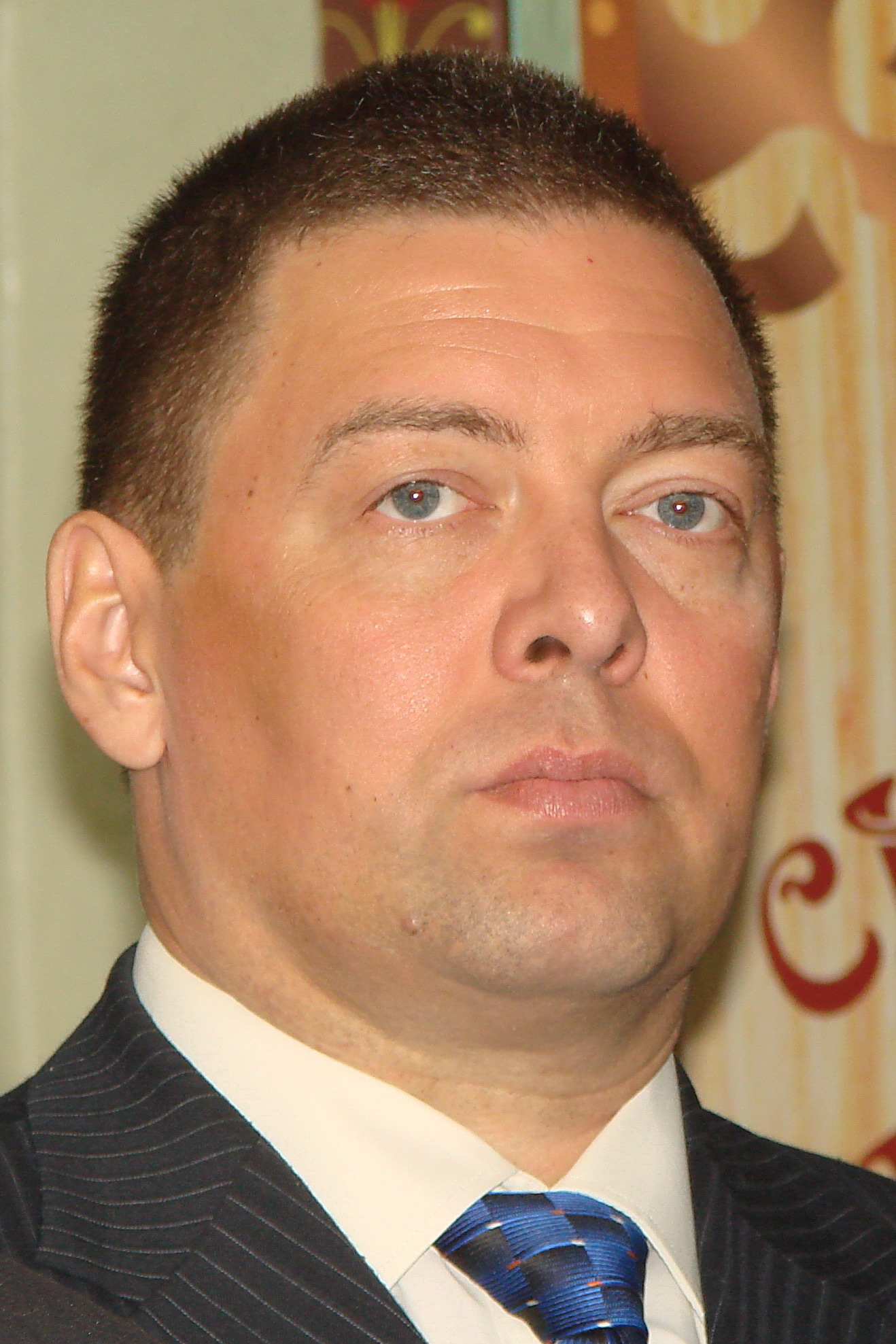
- Konstantin Valkov in 2011.
- Born: November 11, 1971 (age 54); Kamensk-Uralsky, Russian SFSR, Soviet Union
- Space career

RKA Cosmonaut
- Status: Retired
- Rank: Colonel
- Selection: 1997 TsPK Cosmonaut Group

Konstantin Anatolyevich Valkov (Russian: Константин Анатольевич Вальков; born November 11, 1971) is a Russian former Cosmonaut. He was selected as part of the TsPK-12 Cosmonaut group in 1997.

== Biography ==
=== Early life and education ===
Valkov was born in Kamensk-Uralsky, Sverdlovsk Oblast, Russian SFSR on November 11, 1971. In 1994, he graduated from Barnaul Higher Military Air School of Pilots and subsequently became a Colonel in the Russian Air Force.

=== Cosmonaut career ===
Valkov was selected as part of the TsPK-12 group of cosmonauts to train at the Yuri Gagarin Cosmonaut Training Center in 1997. He then completed basic training in 1999. He retired without flying in space in 2012.
