= Gostiny Dvor, Kamensk-Uralsky =

Shopping center in Sverdlovsk, Russia

- Гостиный двор (Каменск-Уральский)
- Interactive map of the Gostiny Dvor, Kamensk-Uralsky area

General information
- Location: Kamensk-Uralsky, 118, 120 Lenin Street
- Coordinates: 56°25′01″N 61°53′43″E
- Completed: 1820-1840s

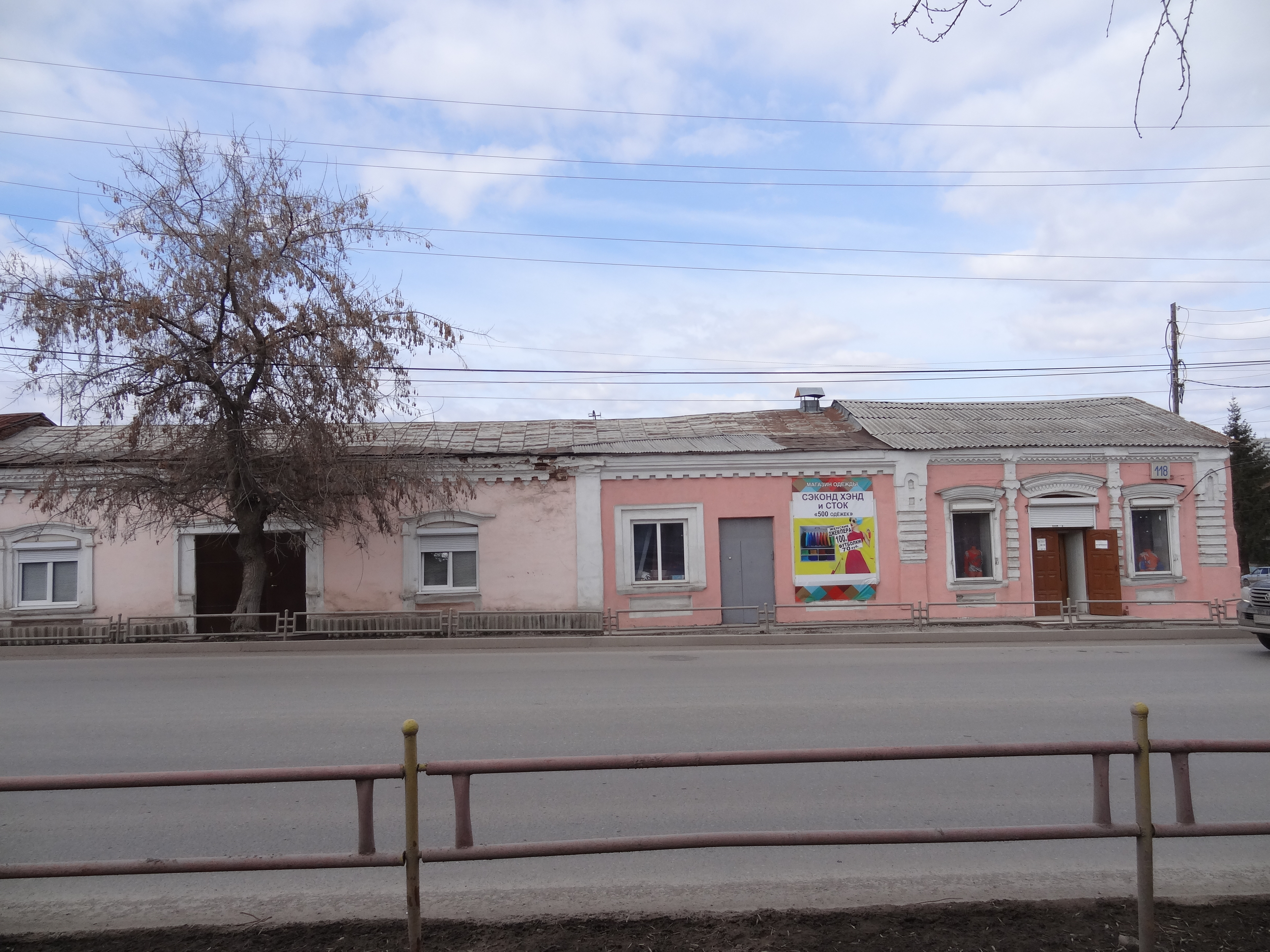
Views of Kamensk-Uralsky (Historical center) (93)

Gostiny Dvor – is a shopping (merchant) center in the historical center of Kamensk-Uralsky, Sverdlovsk oblast.

The building was granted the status of regional significance on 31 December 1987 (decision No. 535 by the executive committee of Sverdlovsk oblast Council of People's Deputies). The object number of cultural heritage of regional significance is 661720983680005.

== Architecture ==
The Gostiny Dvor was built in the period from 1820-1840s and was reconstructed at the end of the 19th century. It was included in the general plan of the town in 1848. It has a rectangular form building with an open center. Structurally the building is divided into two parts: the northern part which overlooking the Cathedral Square, and the southern part - overlooking Lenin Street (former Bolshaya Moskovskaya Street). The Gostiny Dvor forms the southeast corner of the Cathedral Square. It refers to the historical shopping facilities of the Urals at the end of the 19th century.

The main entrance of the building is inside the courtyard. The entire construction is focused on a voluminous composition. The partitions divide the inner space into the rows of the cell rooms. The original interior decor was lost. The authors of the project are not known.

== Literature ==
- В.Е. Звагельская, ed. (2008). Свод памятников истории и культуры Свердловской области. Vol. 2. Екатеринбург: Сократ. p. 648. ISBN 978-5-88664-323-7.
- Памятники архитектуры Каменска-Уральского / С. И. Гаврилова, Л. В. Зенкова, А. В. Кузнецова, А. Ю. Лесунова — Екатеринбург: Банк культурной информации, 2008. — 92 с.
