= Architectural complex "Socgorod Trubnyi", Kamensk-Uralsky =

Architectural complex “Socgorod Trubny”
- Соцгород Трубный

General information
- Architectural style: Constructivism
- Location: Kamensk-Uralsky, 4 Belyaev, 89 Karl Marx
- Coordinates: 56°26′11″N 61°53′37″E
- Construction started: 1932
- Completed: 1940

Complex "Socgorod Trubny", Sverdlovsk region.

Architectural complex “Socgorod Trubny” is a complex of residential buildings in Kamensk-Uralsky, Sverdlovsk oblast.

The complex of buildings was granted the status of regional significance on 28 December 2001 (the Sverdlovsk Oblast Government Decree No. 859). The object number of cultural heritage of regional significance is 661720820900005.

== Architecture ==
The residential complex has a significant historical and architectural value. It represents one of the variants of the socialist town. It was actively developed by the architectors of constructivism. The complex had been being constructed for a long time. It has an integral urban planning composition. The elements of сonstructivism and Soviet neoclassicism combine in the architectural design of the buildings.

The complex is located in the northern part of Kamensk-Uralsky, in the Sinarsky district, near the Sinarsky Pipe Works.

The specialists of "SiraStroy" developed a plan for socialist city in 1932. In the construction used new building methods: line and quarter buildings, wide green lines and a network of cultural and domestic facilities. In the initial plan, the city occupied a smaller area, compared to the final one. Street Trubnaya was central, divided the complex into two blocks and led through the park to the entrance of the plant. Karl Marx Street divided the complex into the eastern (residential) and western (park) zones.

During the construction period of 1935-1940-ies the final volume-planning structure of the central part of the complex was formed. The square named after Belyaev is a center and a guide for the hotel, the palace of culture, shops and apartment buildings. During the construction, the zoning of the neighborhood was observed: in the north and south-west residential areas, in the north-east educational buildings, in the southeast public buildings of culture and recreation, the stadium and sports courts.

From the south to the square there is a wide Karl Marx street, on which there is a shopping arcade. The farm buildings are hidden inside the blocks. On a red line of streets regular rectangular quarters leave. The corners of the blocks are accented by higher corner buildings. Residential quarters have their own internal composition axes that strictly symmetrically organize space. On the inner axes, as a rule, children's institutions are located. Much attention was paid to the primary spatial element of the living environment - the courtyard. Yards were small in size, with a closed or semi-closed character, were decorated with sculptures and small architectural forms: fountains, decorative fences (now lost).

The structure of the residential complex included public buildings: a hotel with a dining room, a boiler room, six kindergartens, two schools, a club, a stadium, an ice court, a bath, a hospital, a built-in station for young technicians, a covered market, built-in shops and a pharmacy.

== Literature ==
- Свод памятников истории и культуры Свердловской области. Vol. 2. Екатеринбург: Сократ. 2008. p. 648. ISBN 978-5-88664-323-7 – via ред. В.Е.Звагельская.
- Памятники архитектуры Каменска-Уральского / С. И. Гаврилова, Л. В. Зенкова, А. В. Кузнецова, А. Ю. Лесунова — Екатеринбург: Банк культурной информации, 2008. — 92 с.

== Sources ==
- Неизвестный Каменск, серия 4 (Синарский район) on YouTube
