= Rail Bridge over the Iset River, Kamensk-Uralsky =

The Rail Bridge over the Iset River
- Железнодорожный мост через Исеть
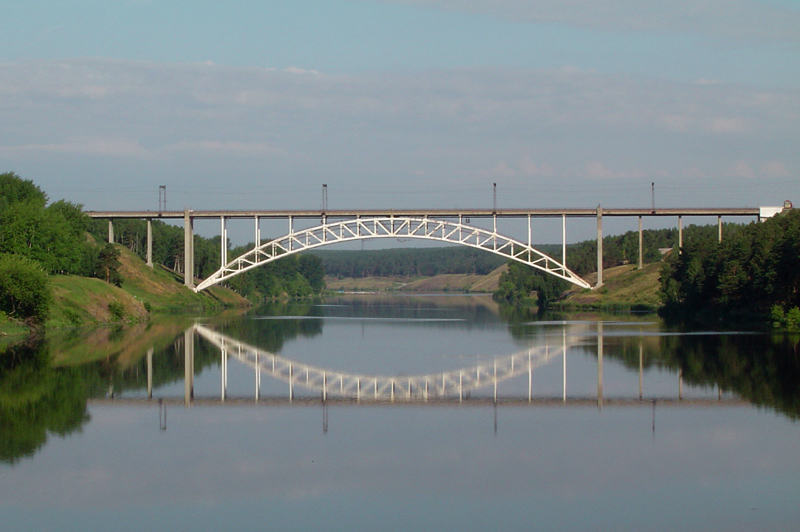
- Interactive map of the The Rail Bridge over the Iset River area

General information
- Location: Kamensk-Uralsky
- Coordinates: 56°23′35″N 61°57′51″E
- Completed: 1939

Design and construction
- Architect: V.A. Rosnovsky

The Rail Bridge over the Iset River - is an experimental bridge over the Iset River is a unique engineering structure made according to the advanced technology of the late 1930s in Kamensk-Uralsky, Sverdlovsk oblast.

The building was granted the status of regional significance on 28 December 2001 (the Sverdlovsk oblast Government Decree № 859). The object number of cultural heritage of regional significance is 661710946850005.

== Architecture ==
In 1934 the construction of the Ural Aluminum Plant began. To support the plant, the Yekaterinburg-Shadrinsk-Kurgan railway line running through Kamensk, but located north of the plant at a considerable distance, was used. By 1938 a project was developed for supplying vehicles through a single-span arched railway bridge.

The bridge was designed by a Moscow engineer, Professor VA Rosnovsky. The professor conducted scientific research in the field of designing of pipe-concrete bridges (for the design and construction of the railway bridge in Kamensk-Uralsky was awarded the Order of the Red Banner of Labor).

The railway bridge is located on the eighth kilometer of the Sinarska-Chelyabinsk railway line in the city of Kamensk-Uralsky.

Construction work was carried out from 1938 to 1940. The length of the span of the bridge was 140 meters, the length of the coastal overpass: the left - 56 meters, the right - 42 meters, the boom - 22 meters. It was built by the Mostotrest organization, the manufacture of metal structures and assembly welding were made by the Verkhnaya Salda factory.

During the construction, a new technology was used at that time - pipe-concrete, the filling of steel pipes with concrete. A constructive scheme was used with the use of a two-hinged arch (externally the bridge is similar to the Konstantinovsky bridge across the Dnieper in the city of Zaporozhye).

== Literature ==
- В.Е.Звагельская, ed. (2008). Свод памятников истории и культуры Свердловской области. Vol. 2. Екатеринбург: Сократ. p. 648. ISBN 978-5-88664-323-7.
- Памятники архитектуры Каменска-Уральского / С. И. Гаврилова, Л. В. Зенкова, А. В. Кузнецова, А. Ю. Лесунова — Екатеринбург: Банк культурной информации, 2008. — 92 с.
- Кикин А. И., Санжаровский Р. С, Трулль В. А. (1974). Конструкции из стальных труб, заполненных бетоном. М.: Стройиздат. pp. 5–7.
