= Nikolay Volkov =

Nikolay Volkov may refer to:

- Nikolay Volkov (politician) (born 1951), governor of the Jewish Autonomous Oblast, Russia
- Nikolay Volkov (1902–1985), actor
- Nikolay Volkov (1934–2003), actor, son of the above
- Nikolai Volkoff (1947–2018), ring name of an American professional wrestler of Yugoslav origin
