= Vólkova =

Argentine duo

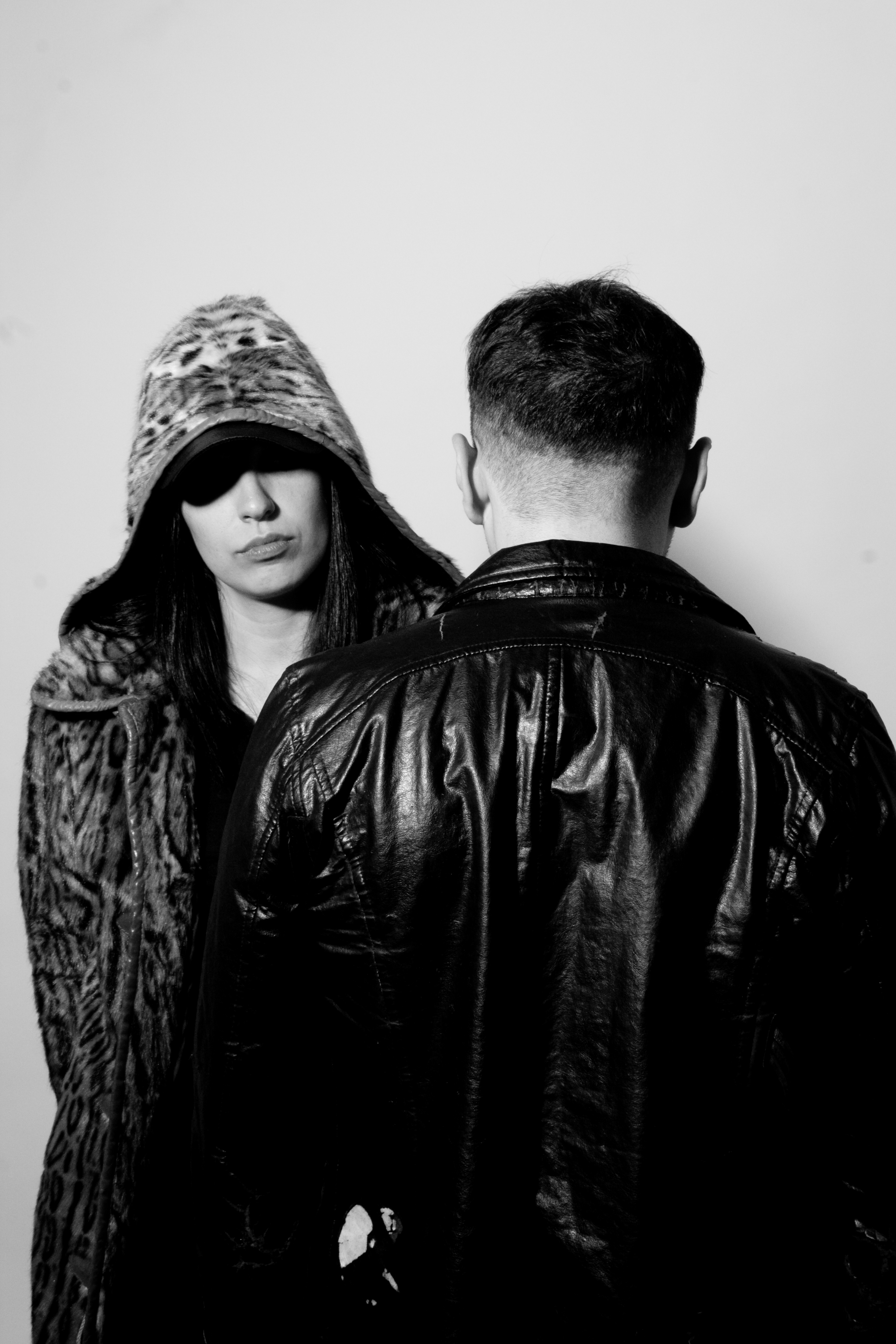

Background information
- Origin: Argentina
- Genres: Synth-pop; darkwave
- Years active: 2013–present
- Labels: Tacuara; Cintas Triangulares; Daft
- Members: Paula Lazzarino; César Canali
- Website: www.tacuara.net

Vólkova is an Argentine duo, originally from Buenos Aires, formed in early 2013, which recreates the atmosphere of electronic and experimental bands and a reminiscent of early industrial music. Influenced by the minimal wave and post-industrial music make their debut album named Confusion is a good weapon consisting of six tracks plus two remixes.

After their debut album Confusion is a good weapon released in mid 2013 and catalogued as one of the breakthrough recordings of the year, Vólkova begins 2014 presenting “Silent Howl”, a limited edition of 300 units in vinyl format, distributed in Europe by Kompuphonik Musik, Kollaps Records and in South America by Tacuara Records. The album includes a password to download all the tracks plus some remixes and live recordings. Following the same line as the first album, but with a stronger sound, “Silent Howl” faces two genres that confirm their Post industrial and Coldwave influences (like the version of Monte Cazazzas's “Birds of prey”). Also, the album goes beyond the genres mentioned before.

The next to-be-released vinyl edition of “Silent Howl” incorporates the song “Pulsion”, which serves as Volkova's second video clip. Pulsion transmits certain landscape's rusticity and apathy, a metaphor of the different moods we sometimes succumb to. It manages to counterpose to such utopian aspirations that move us, and help keep active against the never ending search for that which we desire, that which we exteriorize through music, and the arts in general.

== Discography ==
- 2013 September: "Confusion is a good Weapon" Album Cd - Label: Tacuara Records / Kompuphonik Musik
- 2013 October: " Kalabalik Compilation V/A" Sweden Label: Alvaret Tape Recordings
- 2014 Marc: "Silent Howl" Vinyl 12" EP Label: Kompuphonik Musik Germany
- 2014 June: "Trauma and Dreams" EP Cassette. Label: Cintas Triangulares Perú
- 2014 October: Les Chants de la Mandragore ( SADE ) V/A Sampler CD - France
- 2014 November: Gerpfast 2 Sampler Cd V/A - Indonesia - Label: Gerpfast Kolektif
- 2015 January: Trauma and Dreams + Remixes " edition on Cd" by Tacuara Records / kompuphonik Musik
- 2015 April: "Deep" by Daft Records V/A Sampler Cd, Belgium
- 2014 September Not So Cold Vol.1 Compilation V/A: Song " Come and See "
- 2015 July " SANGRE " Album CD, release by Daft Records Belgium

== Perú Tour ==
- 15-11-2013 live: Vólkova at Coldwave Night I -
- 15-03-2014 live: Vólkova at Coldwave Night II –
- 16-03-2014 live: Vólkova at Fundación Telefónica -

== Euro Tour 2014/2015 ==
- 29-08-14 live: Latvia, Riga at NAKTS MAIŅA FESTIVAL with Xotox, Thinner, Aon and Post TV
- 30-08-14 live: Stockholm, Sweden with The Klinik
- 06-09-14 live: Brussels. Belgium.
- 11-09-14 live: Berlín, Germany, with Sixth June
- 12-09-14 live: Milan, Italy.
- 13-09-14 live Bari, Italy
- 14-09-14 live Salerno, Italy
- 17-09-14 live Paris, France With Orchidee Noire and Déficit Budgétaire
- 29-05-15 Live: Warm Wave Night I Festival. Gothenburg with Twice a man, Keluar, Red Mecca, Alvar
- 30-05-15 Live: Warm Wave Night II Festival. Stockholm with Twice a Man, Keluar, Red Mecca, Alvar
- 05-06-15 Live: Estonia, Taillinn
- 26-06-15 Live: Bochum, Germany with Ash Code
- 03-07-15 Live: Zurich, Switzerland
- 04-07-15 Live: Freiburg, Germany with Hante
- 29-08-15 Live: Lodz, Poland with The Fall & Alles
- 04-09-15 Live: Berlin, Germany With Twice a Man
- 11-09-15 Live: Antwerp, Belgium with Dive
