= Alexander Volkov =

Alexander Volkov or Aleksandr Volkov may refer to:

== Alexander ==
- Alexander Volkov (basketball) (born 1964), Ukrainian former basketball player
- Alexander Volkov (fighter) (born 1988), Russian mixed martial artist
- Alexander Volkov (writer) (Alexander Melentyevich Volkov) (1891–1977), Russian novelist
- Alexander Volkov (tennis) (Alexander Vladimirovich Volkov) (1967–2019), Russian tennis player
- Alexander Volkov (ice hockey) (born 1997), Russian ice hockey winger
- Alexander Alexandrovich Volkov (politician) (1951–2017), President of the Udmurt Republic in Russia
- Alexander Nikolaevich Volkov (1886–1957), Russian painter and teacher
- Alexander Volkov, Israeli pianist and pedagogue, member of the Israel Piano Trio
- Alex Volkov, Book Character in Twisted love by Ana Huang

== Aleksandr ==
- Aleksandr Volkov (ski jumper) (born 1978), Russian Olympic ski jumper
- Aleksandr Volkov (volleyball) (born 1985), Russian volleyball player
- Aleksandr Aleksandrovich Volkov (born 1948), Russian cosmonaut
- Aleksandr Volkov (Soviet functionary), (1903–1975), Russian border guardsman and head of administration of the NKVD Usollag, 1939–1944
- Aleksandr Volkov (general) (1929-2005), Soviet general.

== See also ==
- Alexandre Volkoff (disambiguation)
