= Aleksei Volkov =

Aleksei Volkov may refer to:

- Aleksei Volkov (politician) (1890–1942), Soviet politician
- Aleksei Andreyevich Volkov (1859–1929), valet at the court of the Russian czar Nicholas II
- Aleksei Yevgenyevich Volkov (born 1991), Russian footballer
- Aleksei Volkov (ice hockey) (born 1980), Russian ice hockey player
- Aleksei Volkov (volleyball), Russian athlete who competed in Sitting volleyball at the 2008 Summer Paralympics
- Aleksey Volkov (rugby union), Russian rugby union international
- Alexey Volkov (biathlete) (b. 1988), Russian biathlete
