= Sergei Volchkov (Russian Academy of Sciences) =

Sergei Savvich Volchkov (Russian: Сергей Саввич Волчков; 1707–1773) was a Russian printer, lexicographer, translator.

Volchkov made the first major Russian translations of Baltasar Gracian and Montaigne, and was assigned to the Imperial Academy of Sciences in 1736.

== Selected works ==
- Teusch- Lateinisch- und Ruszisches Lexicon, Ehrenreich Weissmann, Sergei Savvich Volchkov - 1731
