= Kamensk-Uralsky =

City in Sverdlovsk Oblast, Russia

Kamensk-Uralsky Каменск-Уральский
- City
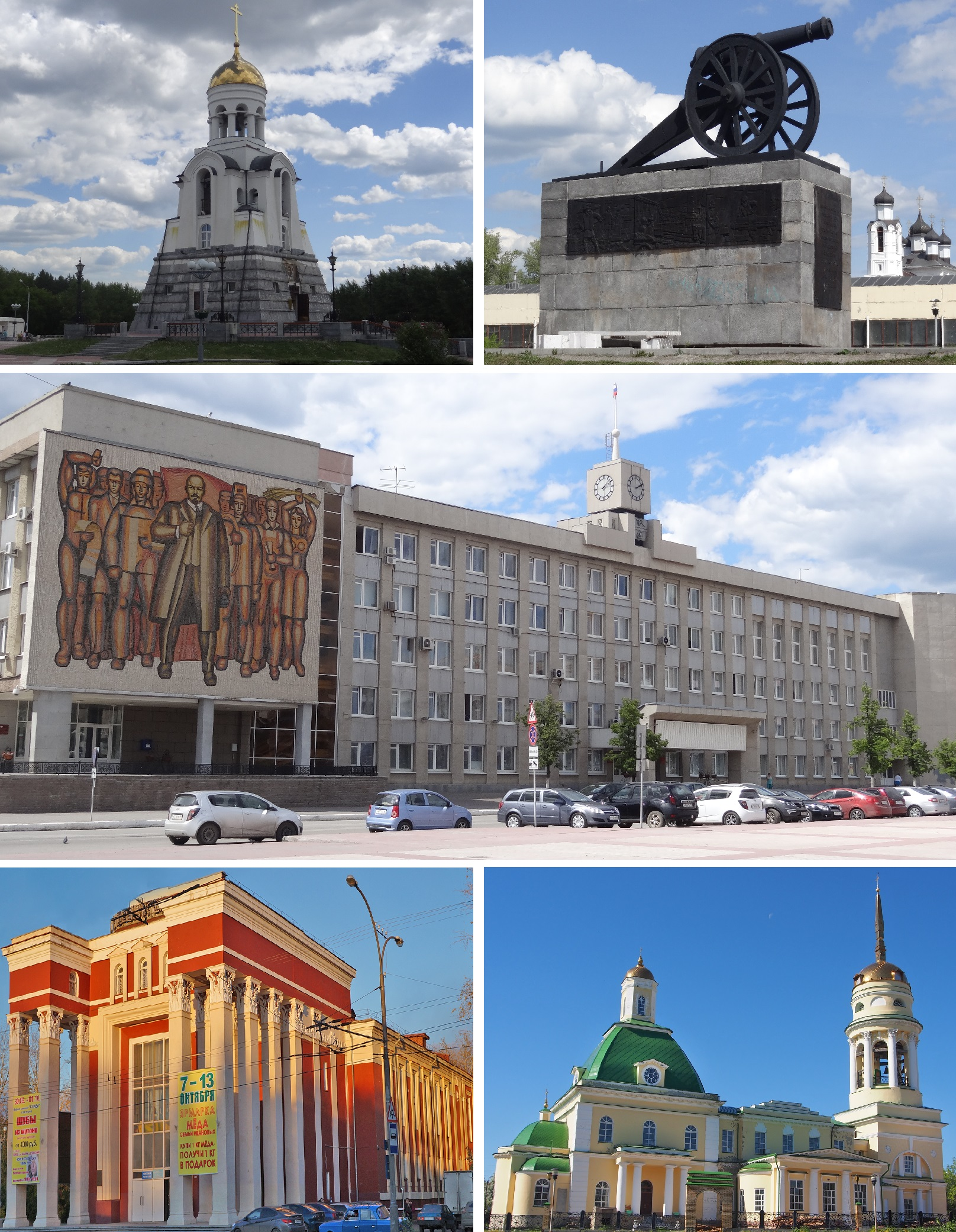

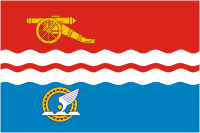
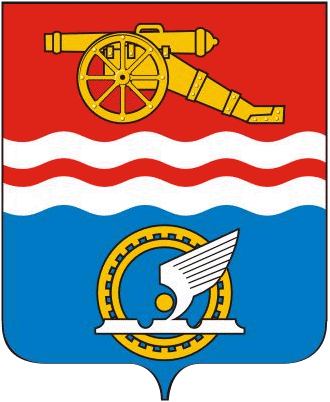
- Flag Coat of arms
- Interactive map of Kamensk-Uralsky
- Location of Kamensk-Uralsky Kamensk-Uralsky (Sverdlovsk Oblast)
- Coordinates: 56°24′N 61°56′E
- Country: Russia
- Federal subject: Sverdlovsk Oblast
- Founded: 1701
- City status since: 1935

Government
  - Head: Aleksey Gerasimov
- Elevation: 160 m (520 ft)

Population (2010 Census)
  - Total: 174,689
  - Estimate (2025): 160,312 (−8.2%)
  - Rank: 104th in 2010

Administrative status
  - Subordinated to: City of Kamensk-Uralsky
  - Capital of: Kamensky District, City of Kamensk-Uralsky

Municipal status
  - Urban okrug: Kamensk-Uralsky Urban Okrug
  - Capital of: Kamensk-Uralsky Urban Okrug
- Time zone: UTC+5 (MSK+2)
- Postal code: 6234XX
- Dialing code: +7 3439
- OKTMO ID: 65740000001
- Website: www.kamensk-uralskiy.ru

Kamensk-Uralsky (Russian: Ка́менск-Ура́льский, IPA: [ˈkamʲɪnsk ʊˈralʲskʲɪj]) is a city in Sverdlovsk Oblast, Russia, located at the confluence of the Kamenka and Iset Rivers (Ob's basin). Population: 174,689 (2010 census); 186,153 (2002 census); 207,780 (1989 Soviet census); 173,000 (1972); 51,000 (1939).

Historical population
Year	Pop.	±%
1926	5,000	—
1939	51,400	+928.0%
1959	141,019	+174.4%
1970	169,270	+20.0%
1979	187,401	+10.7%
1989	207,780	+10.9%
2002	186,153	−10.4%
2010	174,689	−6.2%
2021	164,192	−6.0%
Source: Census data

== History ==
Kamensky Zavod was founded in the late 17th century as a settlement next to the cast iron smelting factory and foundry, commissioned on October 15, 1701. For the first two centuries of existence it was known for its cannons.

First schools opened in Kamensk in 1724. The cast iron smelting factory was rebuilt in 1825–1829. Railway traffic started on December 6, 1885. The first library opened in 1899. In 1934, Sinarsky Pipe Works was established. In 1939, Ural Aluminum Factory was established.

Kamensk was granted city status in 1935 and renamed Kamensk-Uralsky in 1940.

== Administrative and municipal status ==
Within the framework of the administrative divisions, Kamensk-Uralsky serves as the administrative center of Kamensky District, even though it is not a part of it. As an administrative division, it is, together with six rural localities, incorporated separately as the City of Kamensk-Uralsky—an administrative unit with the status equal to that of the districts. As a municipal division, the City of Kamensk-Uralsky is incorporated as Kamensk-Uralsky Urban Okrug. The City is divided on 2 districts separated by Iset River, Sinarsky and Krasnogorsky.

== Economy ==
Kamensk-Uralsky is one of the fastest-growing cities in the oblast. Industrial production includes: fuel-energy and metallurgical complex, machinery construction, electronics (semiconductors and computers), light and food industry, transport and communication.

The most developed industry is metallurgical production, particularly non-ferrous metallurgy, which occupies 69% of the total volume of industrial production of the city and 12.9% of the oblast.

=== Main businesses ===
Four main companies (Sinarsky Pipe Works, Kamensk-Uralsky Metallurgical Works, SUAL-UAZ and Oktyabr Factory) account for 75% of the total value of industrial production.

==== Sinarsky Pipe Works ====
SinTZ (Sinarsky Pipe Works) is a Russian manufacturer of steel, stainless-steel, and cast-iron pipes. Its products are used in the oil and gas industry, machine building, power generation, construction, and public utilities. The company reports that it enters into more than 3,000 manufacturing and supply contracts annually, covering more than 12,000 product items.

==== Kamensk-Uralsky Metallurgical Works (KUMZ) ====
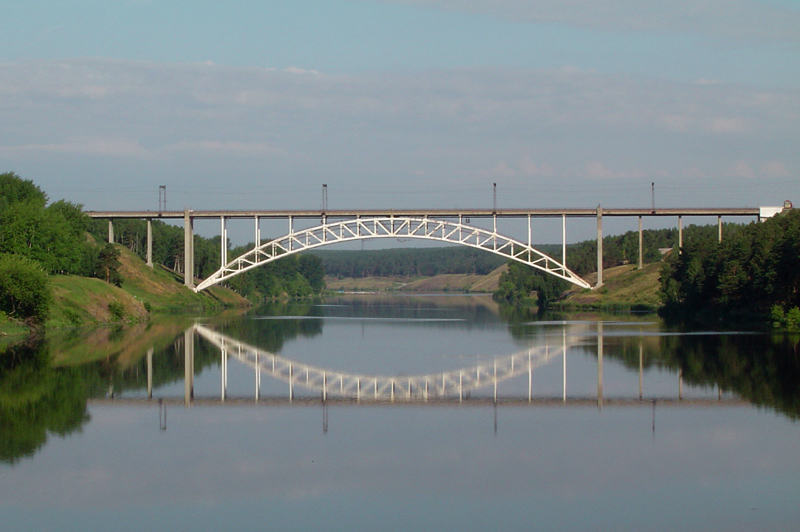
Railway bridge over the Iset River

Kamensk-Uralsky Metallurgical Works (KUMZ) was founded as a special metallurgy mill belonging to the Ministry of Aircraft Industry for providing aircraft construction with semi-finished products made of aluminum and magnesium alloys. Building of the first mill stage was accomplished in 1944.

In 1945–1992, the mill has become one of the leading enterprises of the special metallurgy. Restructuring and diversification enabled the company to liquidate unprofitable production lines, master output new kinds of products, come to foreign markets, and significantly increase the mill's efficiency. In April 2000, KUMZ joined Russian Association of Metal Traders (RAMT).

KLUZ Iset Arus, Uralelektromash, Uraltehmash

== Culture and education ==
There are 123 different cultural establishments in Kamensk-Uralsky: 10 educational institutions (3 music schools, 2 schools of art, 2 schools of drawing); 90 public libraries; 5 theaters; 11 clubs; 2 movie theaters.

There are branches of the Ural State Technical University, the Ural State University of Economics, and of the Ural Institute of Economics, Management, and Law in the city.

== Tourism ==
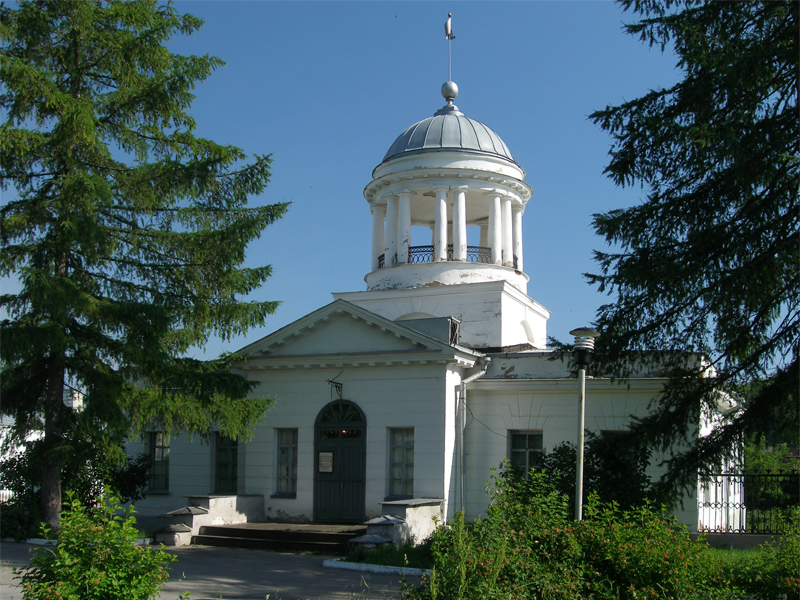
Building of administration of the State iron foundry

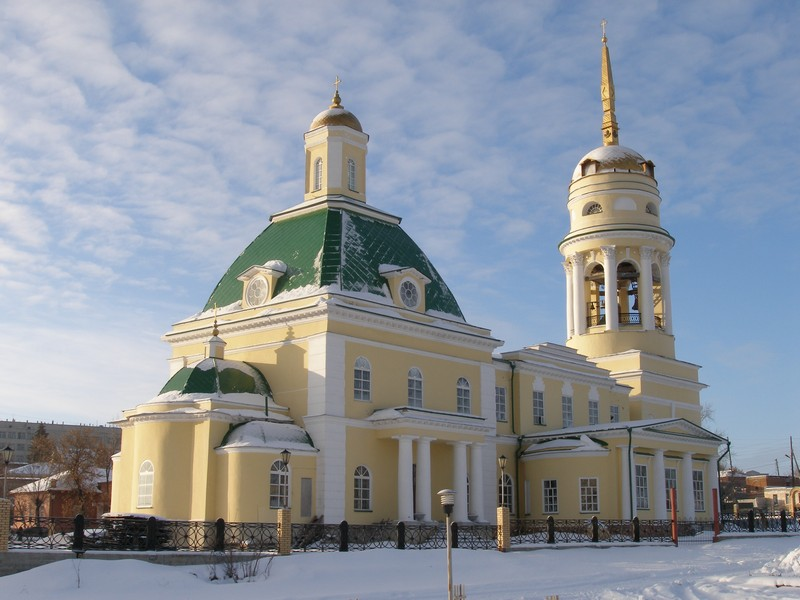
Holy Trinity Cathedral

Kamensk-Uralsky is one of the historical cities of Russia.

Well known sights of Kamensk-Uralsky include:

- Cannon monument - city symbol (sculptor Permyakov V.V., 1967),
- the Stone Gates (limestone rock, landmark of regional value),
- unique project Railway bridge over Iset river (Rosnovsky V.A., 1939, 140 m arch bridge of steel tubes filled with concrete),
- the Building of administration of the State iron foundry (architect Malakhov M.P., 19th century).
- 36 Krasnykh Orlov Street (19th century).

=== City traditions ===
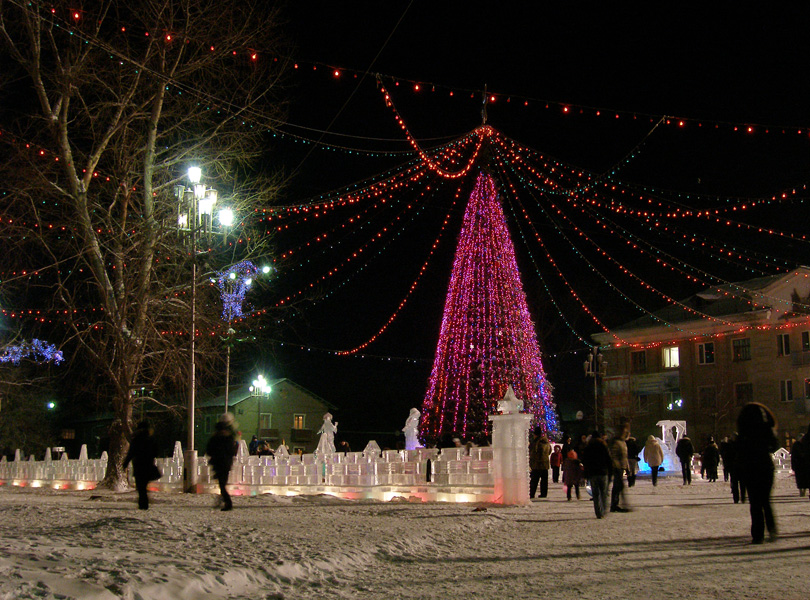
Chkalovsky Snow Town (January 2009)

- Ice (snow) Towns. Every year in December, approaching New Year's Eve, city companies build small towns of ice and snow. These towns include ice slides, snow and ice figures of fairy tales characters, Chinese zodiac animals, Ded Moroz and Snegurochka. Towns are embellished with New Year's trees and light garlands(similar to Christmas lights in western countries) with hundreds of colorful bulbs. This tradition is more than thirty years old. Usual pretenders to the name of the best Ice Town are Central town (at Lenin Komsomol square, built on the funds of Kamensk-Uralsky administration), Chkalovsky town (KUMZ) and Trubny town (SinTZ).
- Kamensk-Uralsky – Bell Capital festival. This is a festival of the best bell ringers from all around Russia. They exchange experience and host many master classes during this time. The first festival was conducted in 2005. It is a joint project of the Kamensk-Uralsky city administration and well-known bell manufacturers situated in the city, "Pyatkov and Co".
- Carnival (during the celebration of City Day). It is a costumed procession across Victory avenue to the central square of the city. City Day in Kamensk-Uralsky coincides with Metallurgist's Day in Russia. It takes place on the third Saturday of July. The first Carnival was conducted on July 15, 2000.

=== Aeronautics ===
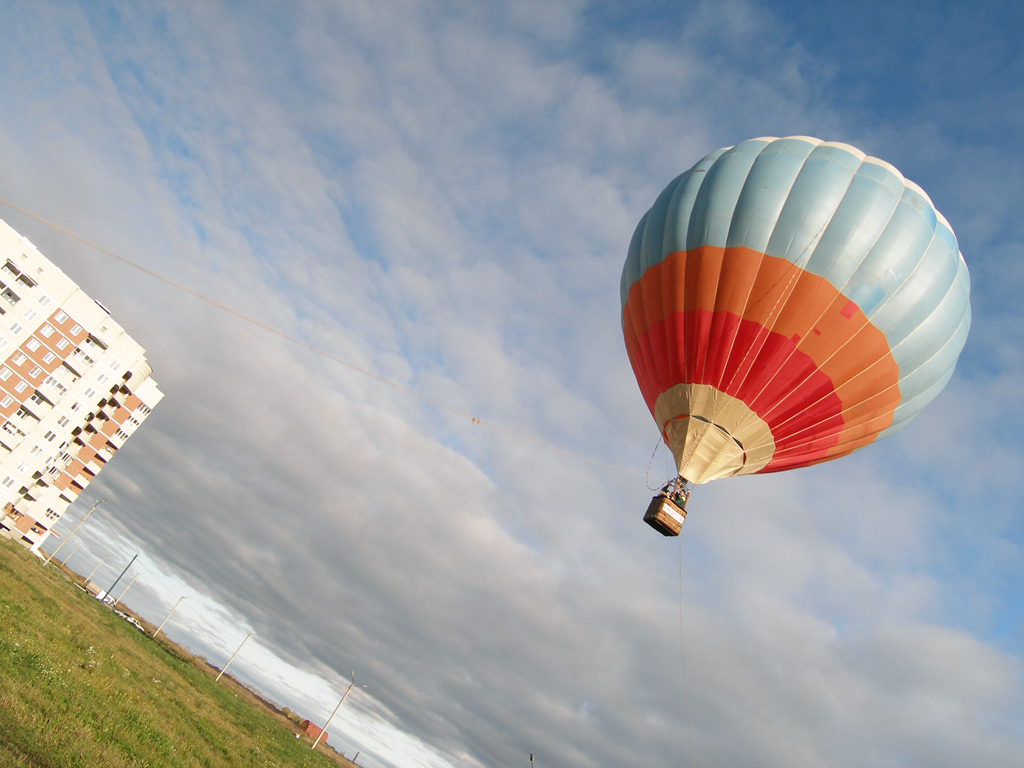
Balloon flight near Yuzhny Microdistrict in Kamensk-Uralsky (September 2009)

Most festivities are accompanied with flights of a hot air balloon, which is piloted by members of the local aeronautics club and guests. The first free flight of the Kamensk balloon was performed on 22 July 2009. Development of aeronautics in the city allows people to take pleasure of a bird's-eye view of the surroundings.

== Notable people ==
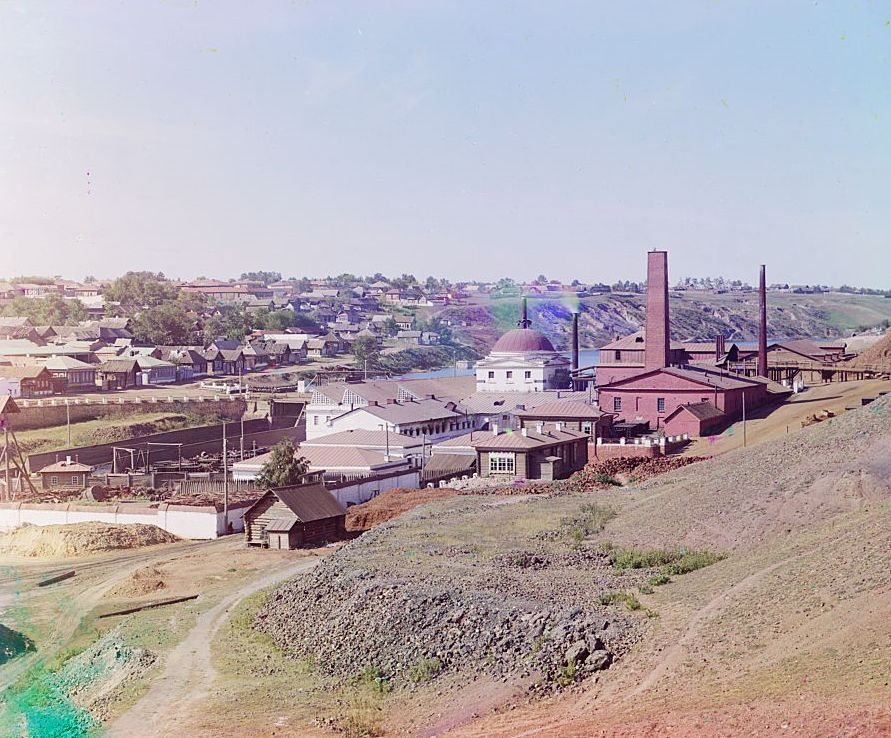
Prokudin-Gorsky, Kamensky zavod, 1910

Famous people born, lived or worked in Kamensk-Uralsky

- Mikhail Pavlovich Malakhov, architect
- Sergey Prokudin-Gorsky, chemist and photographer
- Alexander Karpinsky, geologist and mineralogist
- Pavel Belyayev, cosmonaut
- Vera Mukhina, sculptor

== See also ==
- Architectural complex “Socgorod Trubnyi”, Kamensk-Uralsky
- Kamensk-Uralsky (air base)
- Gostiny Dvor (shopping center in the historical center of Kamensk-Uralsky)
