= Irbit (river) =

River in Sverdlovsk Oblast, Russia

Coordinates: 57°40′48″N 63°04′36″E

The Irbit (Russian: Ирбит) is a river in Sverdlovsk Oblast, Russia in the Tura River basin. It is a tributary of the Nitsa. It has its sources near the town of Sukhoy Log, which is on the Pyshma River and flows in a northeasterly direction between the Pyshma and Nitsa towards its mouth in the Nitsa at the town of Irbit.
