= Ural pictograms =

Pictograms in the Ural region

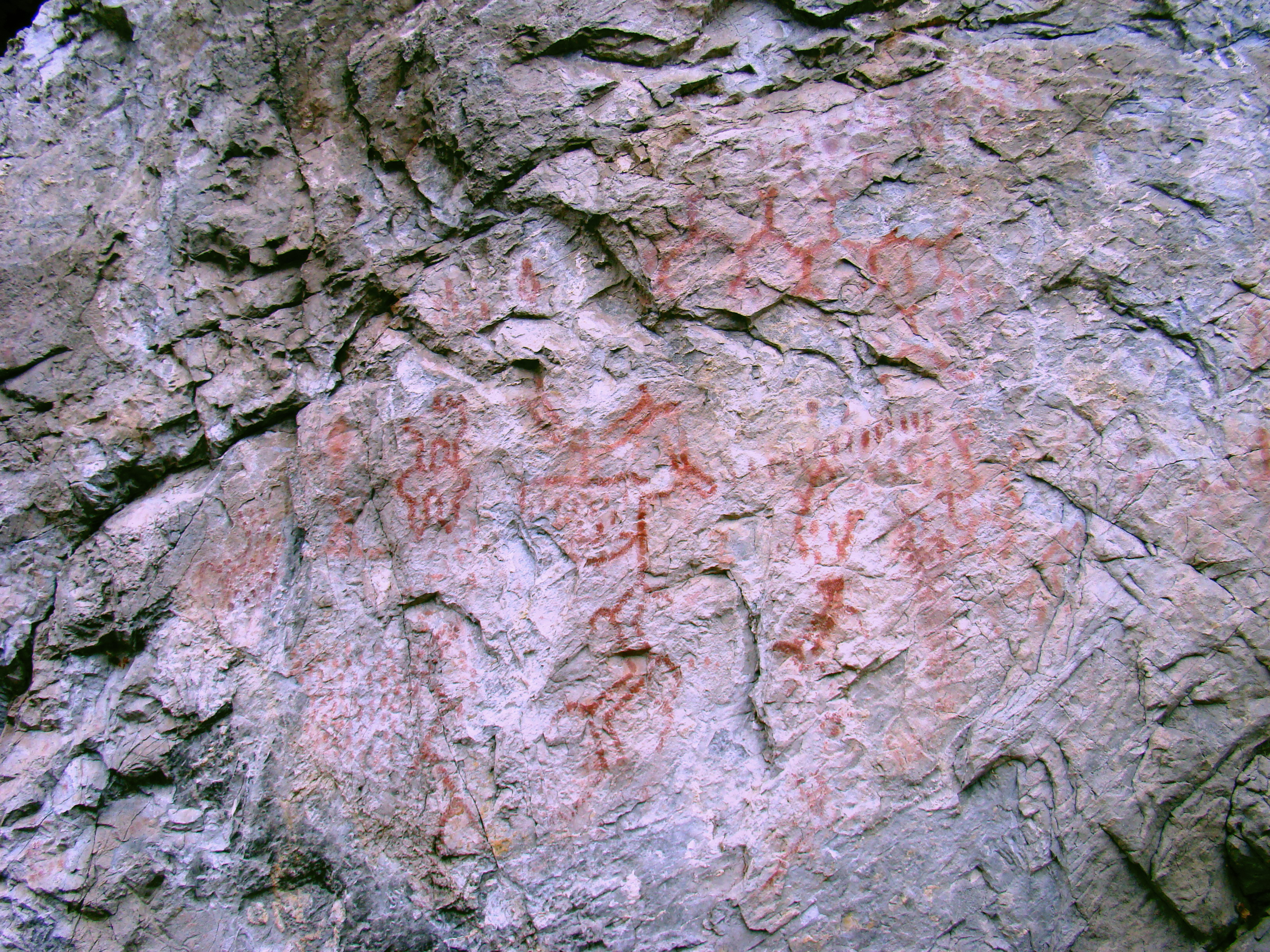
pictograms on the Neyva River

The Ural pictograms (Russian: уральские писаницы) are prehistoric pictograms in Ural dated to 3,000–2,000 years BC and located along the coasts of Tagil River, Neyva River, Rezh River, Yurozan River and some other sites. The color of the pictograms is different, varying from ochre, probably mixed up with blood, to lilac and brown, while the thickness is between 10 and 20 mm. The existence of the Ural characters was known long ago. Peter the Great in 1699 ordered the scrivener Yakov Losyov to go there and make an exact copy.

The Ural pictograms span for about 800 km from north to south. The northernmost ones were found on the rivers Kolva and Vishera, while the southernmost ones were detected at Belaya River. The majority of Ural pictograms, however, were discovered along the Tagil River.

== Characteristics ==
The Ural pictograms are tied to the indigenous Ural population. The pictograms were painted by finger or some tool from the ground level and artificial elevations, which allowed painting at the height of over three meters. Some pictogram lines are 4-5 cm thick. The images are generally aligned to the south. The Ural pictograms include the images of birds, animals, humans and various geometrical figures. The images of animals mainly depict moose, deer and roe deer. The birds are generally represented by waterfowl, mainly ducks and geese. Other images depict snakes and bear. Several pictograms of living beings feature skeleton pattern, showing the internal organs.

In 2001 a carved image was found at the River Rezh, which disproved the long-standing opinion that all Ural pictograms are painted.

== Interpretations ==
According to Russian researcher Valeriy Chernetsov, who published The Rock Images of Ural (1st volume in 1964, 2nd volume in 1971), the Ural pictograms generally depict the hunting utensil. The pictograms, however, as emphasized by Chernetsov, have no direct association with fishing as no images of fishes have been found on sites.

== See also ==
- Kamyana Mohyla
- Vinča signs
