= Shelkov =

Shelkov (feminine: Shelkova) is a surname. Notable people with the surname include:

- Mikhail Shelkov (born 1968), 21st century Russian oligarch
- Vladimir Shelkov (1895–1980), Seventh-day Adventist preacher in the former Soviet Union
