= St. Nicholas Church, Novopyshminskoe =

Church located in the Sverdlovsk Oblast

St. Nicholas Church
- Церковь Святого Николая Чудотворца
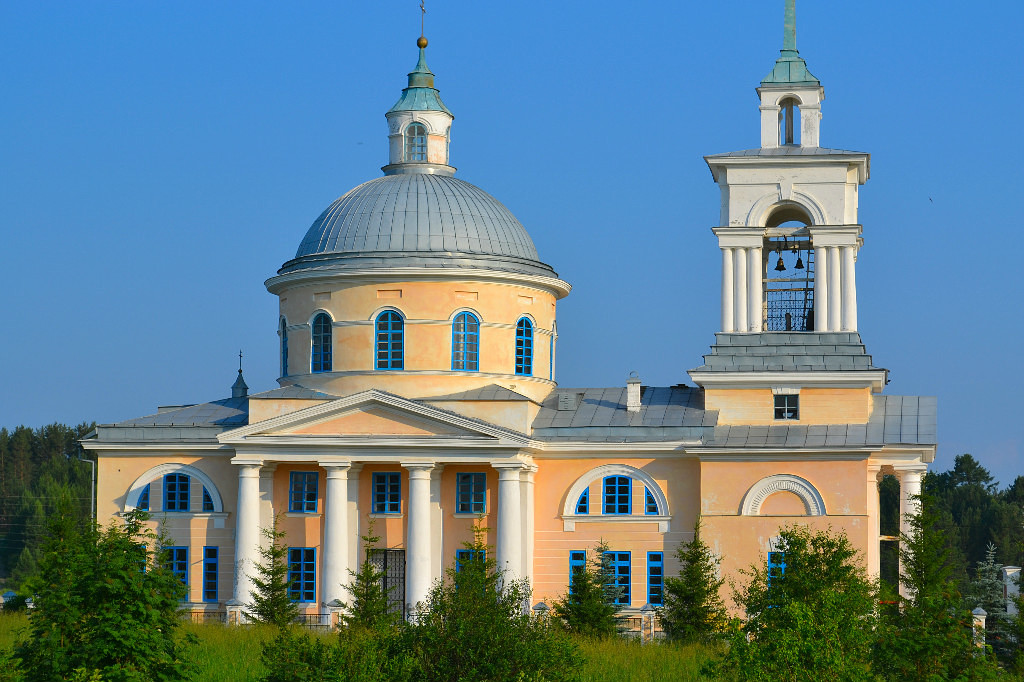
- Shown in 2014.
- Interactive map of the St. Nicholas Church area

General information
- Location: Novopyshminskoe
- Coordinates: 56°53′16″N 62°14′45″E
- Completed: the 18th century

St. Nicholas Church is an Orthodox church in Novopyshminskoe village, Sverdlovsk Oblast.

The building was granted the status of regional significance on 31 December 1987 (decision № 535 by the executive committee of Sverdlovsk Oblast Council of People's Deputies). The object number of cultural heritage of regional significance is 661710820990005.

== History ==
The church is located on the left bank of the Pyshma River which once was the entrance to the village. The parish was formed in 1752. It consisted of three villages: Sergulovka, Kazanskaya, Zaimskaya.

The wooden church was built in 1752. It wasn't until1835 that the fundamental construction of a stone building started. The main part of the building was consecrated in the name of St. Nicholas. The side-altar was consecrated in the name of John the Evangelist in 1842. The clergy of the parish consisted of a priest, a deacon and a psalmist. The priest had a public house in the village. The parish included a chapel in Novopyshminskoe village and a chapel in Kazanskaya village. A county school functioned in the village. In1893, a literacy school was opened in Sergulovka village.

The peal of bells were banned in 1934, and the church has been closed since 1937. The Orthodox parish was reorganized in 1991. The church was restored on 22 May 1998.

== Architecture ==
The stone church has a parallelepiped form with small ledges. It is supplemented by the same altar and refectory. In the western part of the building is a bell tower. The northern and the southern parts of the building include four-columned porticos, with pediments in the Tuscan order style. There are pilasters behind the columns, between rectangular windows. The dome drum is decorated with arched windows. Above the window openings are small horizontal niches. Altars and a refectory are timbered in a rustic style up to half a height. Windows are triple, rectangular at the bottom, with archivolt in the upper part.

The base of the bell tower is decorated with porticos, identical to those in the church. The spire rises on the bell tower roof. Arc-shaped gates with two lobbies on the sides stand strong.

== Literature ==
- В.Е.Звагельская, ed. (2008). Свод памятников истории и культуры Свердловской области. Vol. 2. Екатеринбург: Сократ. p. 648. ISBN 978-5-88664-323-7.
- Бурлакова Н.Н. (2011). Забытые храмы Свердловской области. Екатеринбург: Сократ. pp. 128–129. ISBN 978-5-88664-395-4.
- Приходы и церкви Екатеринбургской епархии. Екатеринбург: Братство Св. Праведного Симеона Верхотурского Чудотворца. 1902. p. 647.
