= Akinfiyevo =

Akinfiyevo Акинфиево
- selo
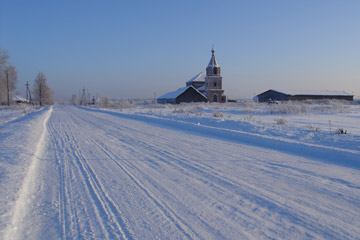
- Selo Akinfievo
- Interactive map of Akinfiyevo
- Location of Akinfiyevo Akinfiyevo (Sverdlovsk Oblast)
- Coordinates: 58°03′21″N 61°01′04″E
- Country: Russia
- Federal subject: Sverdlovsk Oblast
- Administrative district: Nizhnyaya Salda urban district

Population
  - Estimate (2010): 219 )
- Time zone: UTC+5 (MSK+2)
- Postal code: 624740
- Dialing code: +7 34345
- OKTMO ID: 65750000121

Akinfiyevo ( Russian: Акинфиево) – is a village in Nizhnyaya Salda urban district of Sverdlovsk Oblast. Population: 218

== Geography ==
The village is located in the centre of Sverdlovsk Oblast, 17 kilometres away from urban-type settlement of Nizhnyaya Salda, 170 kilometres away from Yekaterinburg.

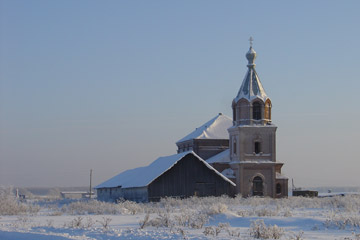
The church

== History ==
Akinfievo was founded at the end of 18th century by the Count Nikolai Nikitich Demidov. The inhabitants were engaged mainly in timber logging and extraction of stumps and delivered these materials to the Nizhnesaldinsky metallurgic plant. In addition, the main occupations were farming and animal husbandry. By the 21st century the main activity of the population - agriculture - has changed. Now inhabitants work at the industrial enterprises, in the sphere of education and trade.

== Population ==
In 1843, there were 62 houses and 325 inhabitants in the village. In 1970 - 474 people. 2010 - 240 people. 2011 - 218 people.

== Remarkable sights ==
- The obelisk to the participant of the Great Patriotic War
- The church of the Mother of God

== Sources ==
1. - The church of the Mother of God in Akinfievo (Russian)
2. - Akinfievo, the selo (Russian)
3. - The history of the selo
