= Rezh (river) =

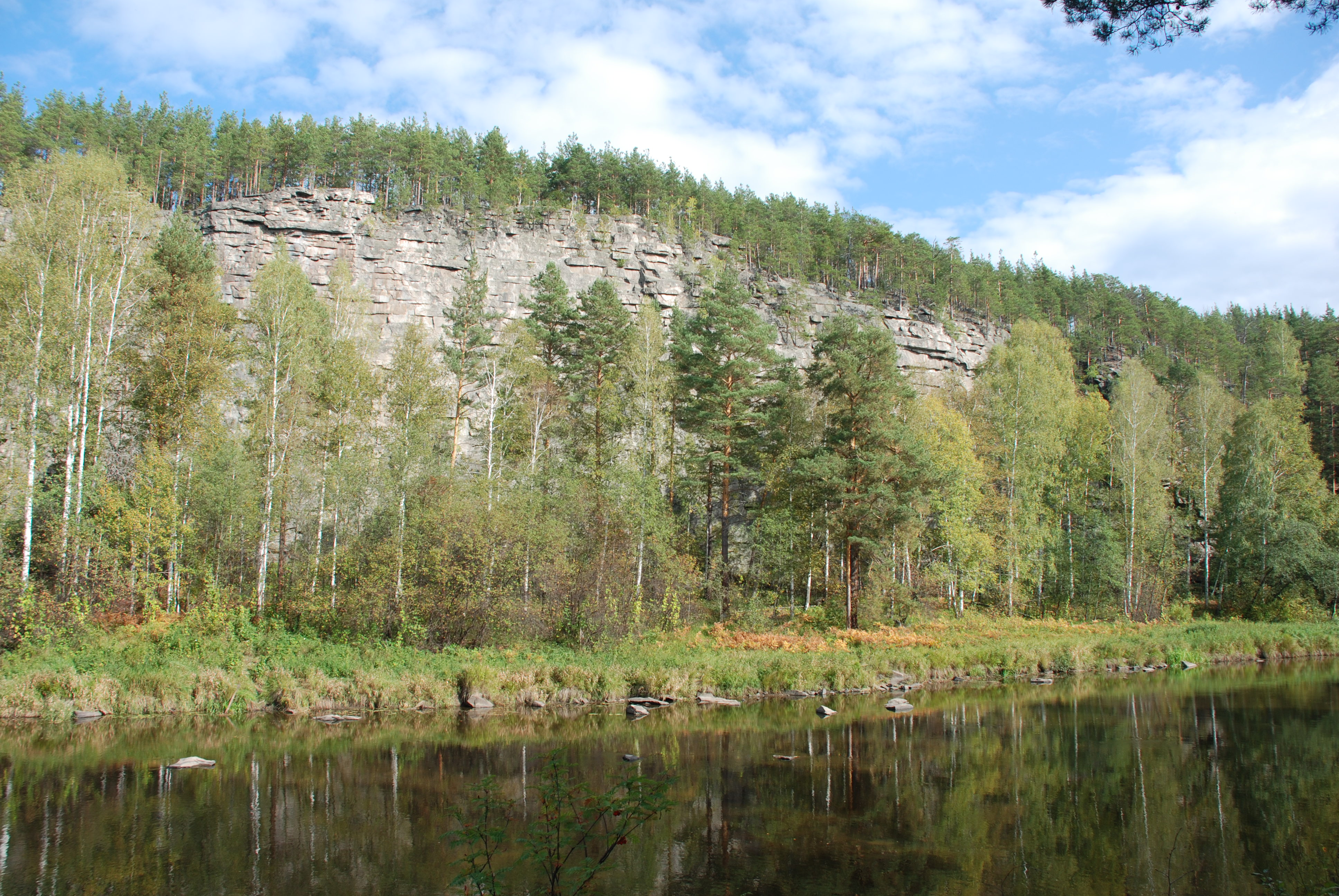

- Tura basin

Location
- Country: Russia

Physical characteristics
- Mouth: Nitsa
  - coordinates: 57°54′42″N 62°18′39″E
- Length: 219 km (136 mi)
- Basin size: 4,400 km^{2} (1,700 sq mi)

Basin features
- Progression: Nitsa→ Tura→ Tobol→ Irtysh→ Ob→ Kara Sea

The Rezh (Russian: Реж) is a river in Sverdlovsk Oblast, Russia. At its confluence with the Neyva, the Nitsa (a tributary of the Tura, Ob's drainage basin) is formed. It is 219 kilometres (136 mi) long, with a drainage basin of 4,400 square kilometres (1,700 mi^{2}).

The Rezh has its sources in the central Ural Mountains, and flows towards the northeast towards its confluence with the Neyva. The largest town by the river is Rezh.
