= Mikhail Shelkov =

Russian businessman

- Born: March 30, 1968 (age 57); Russia
- Occupation(s): Industrialist, investor
- Known for: Majority owner of Russian titanium company VSMPO-AVISMA and involvement in theft from the Ukrainian government

Mikhail Shelkov (born March 30, 1968) is a Russian billionaire and the majority owner of VSMPO-AVISMA, a Russian titanium firm, through his ownership of Industrial Investments LLC.

VSMPO stands for VerkhneSaldinskoye Metallurgicheskoye Proizvodstvennoye Ob'yedineniye (Верхнесалдинское металлургическое производственное объединение, Metal-producing company of Verkhnyaya Salda; and AVISMA for AVIatsionnyye Spetsial'nyye MAterialy or AVIation Special MAterials).

== Career ==
In 2016 Shelkov joined with Rostec to invest in the Oktava factory project, which is located in Tula.

== Sanctions and Ukraine ==
In 2018 Shelkov, whose Avisma company "provides landing gear parts for about one third of all Boeing jets", had not been sanctioned in the aftermath of the Annexation of Crimea.

In July 2022 Reuters noted that Shelkov hadn't yet been sanctioned by any Western country. And by March 2023 Shelkov was not sanctioned by the US, EU nor the UK.

In August 2023 the SPFU cancelled an auction of InvestAgro LLC, property of Shelkov which it had obtained from the court, because of disinterest.

In August 2023 the Security Service of Ukraine (SBU) revealed to the court a scheme by which Shelkov stole from the State Property Fund of Ukraine, which had become the owner of the Demurinsky mining and beneficiation plant in the Dnipropetrovsk region since Shelkov had been relieved of this asset by National Security and Defense Council of Ukraine sanctions in February 2023. The plant employs 284 people, and has been in production since 2006. He was charged with two infractions of the Criminal Code of Ukraine:

- 212 evasion of payment of taxes, fees (mandatory payments));
- 209 laundering of property obtained by crime

In July 2024 Shelkov was convicted of profiting from a scheme by which he managed to import to Russia a significant quantity of Ukrainian ore, from Demurinsky, via an Austrian intermediary. The Austrian go-between never touched the resource, which was exported directly from Ukraine to Russia. Shelkov had formerly owned the Demurinsky complex but it was expropriated from him owing to sanctions against Russia for its victimization of Ukraine. His Austrian enterprise acted as a customer of Demurinsky but in reality, the minerals were sent directly to Russia by rail.

In July 2024 the privatization of Demurinsky was stalled.
