= Sukholozhsky District =

District in Sverdlovsk Oblast, Russia

Sukholozhsky District Сухоложский район (Russian)
- District
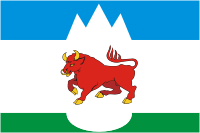
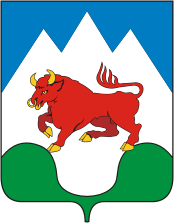
- Flag Coat of arms
- Location of Sukholozhsky District in Sverdlovsk Oblast
- Coordinates: 56.911°N 62.033°E
- Country: Russia
- Federal subject: Sverdlovsk Oblast
- Established: 10 July 1931
- Administrative center: Sukhoy Log

Area
  - Total: 1,684.51 km^{2} (650.39 sq mi)

Population (2010 Census)
  - Total: 14,451
  - Density: 8.5788/km^{2} (22.219/sq mi)
  - Urban: 0%
  - Rural: 100%

Administrative structure
  - Administrative divisions: 1 Towns, 8 Selsoviets
  - Inhabited localities: 1 cities/towns, 25 rural localities

Municipal structure
  - Municipally incorporated as: Sukhoy Log Urban Okrug
- Time zone: UTC+5 (MSK+2)
- OKTMO ID: 65758000
- Website: http://www.goslog.ru/

Sukholozhsky District (Russian: Сухоложский райо́н) is an administrative district (raion), one of the thirty in Sverdlovsk Oblast, Russia. As a municipal division, it is incorporated as Sukhoy Log Urban Okrug. Its administrative center is the town of Sukhoy Log. Population (excluding the administrative center): 14,451 (2010 Census); 13,901 (2002 Census); 14,049 (1989 Soviet census).
