= Salda (Tagil) =

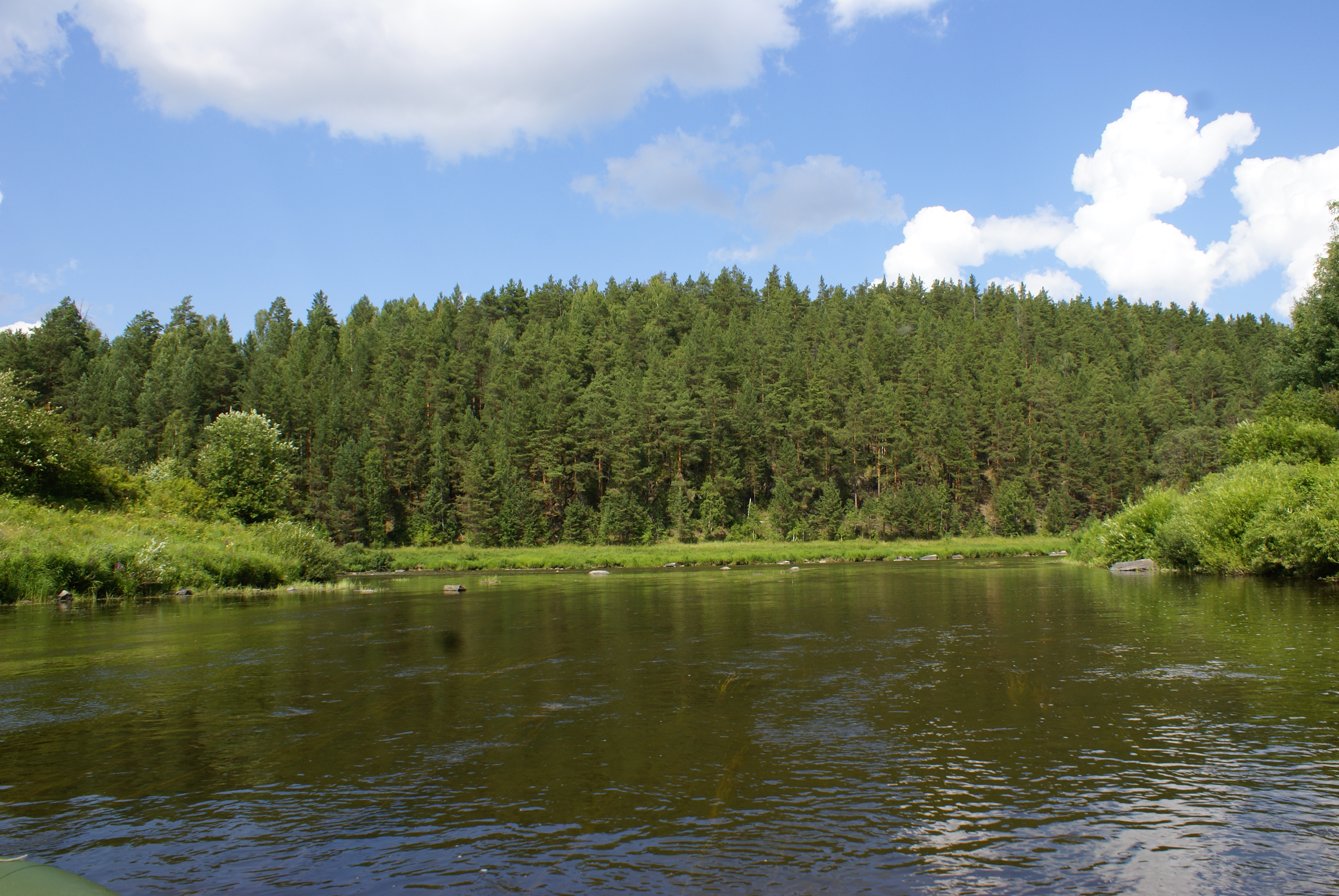

Location
- Country: Russia

Physical characteristics
- Mouth: Tagil
  - coordinates: 58°13′47″N 61°03′17″E
- Length: 122 km (76 mi)
- Basin size: 1,770 km^{2} (680 sq mi)

Basin features
- Progression: Tagil→ Tura→ Tobol→ Irtysh→ Ob→ Kara Sea

The Salda (Russian: Салда) is a river in Sverdlovsk Oblast, Russia. It is a tributary of the Tagil (in the Ob's drainage basin). The Salda has its sources in the Ural Mountains. It is 122 kilometres (76 mi) long, with a drainage basin of 1,770 square kilometres (680 mi^{2}). The average discharge is 7.2 cubic metres per second (250 cu ft/s) about 4 kilometres (2.5 mi) upstream of its mouth. The Salda freezes over in late October or early November, and stays frozen until the spring thaw in April.

The towns of Verkhnyaya Salda and Nizhnyaya Salda are by the Salda, where the Verkhne-Salda and Nizhne-Salda reservoirs were created.
