= Nitsa =

River in Russia

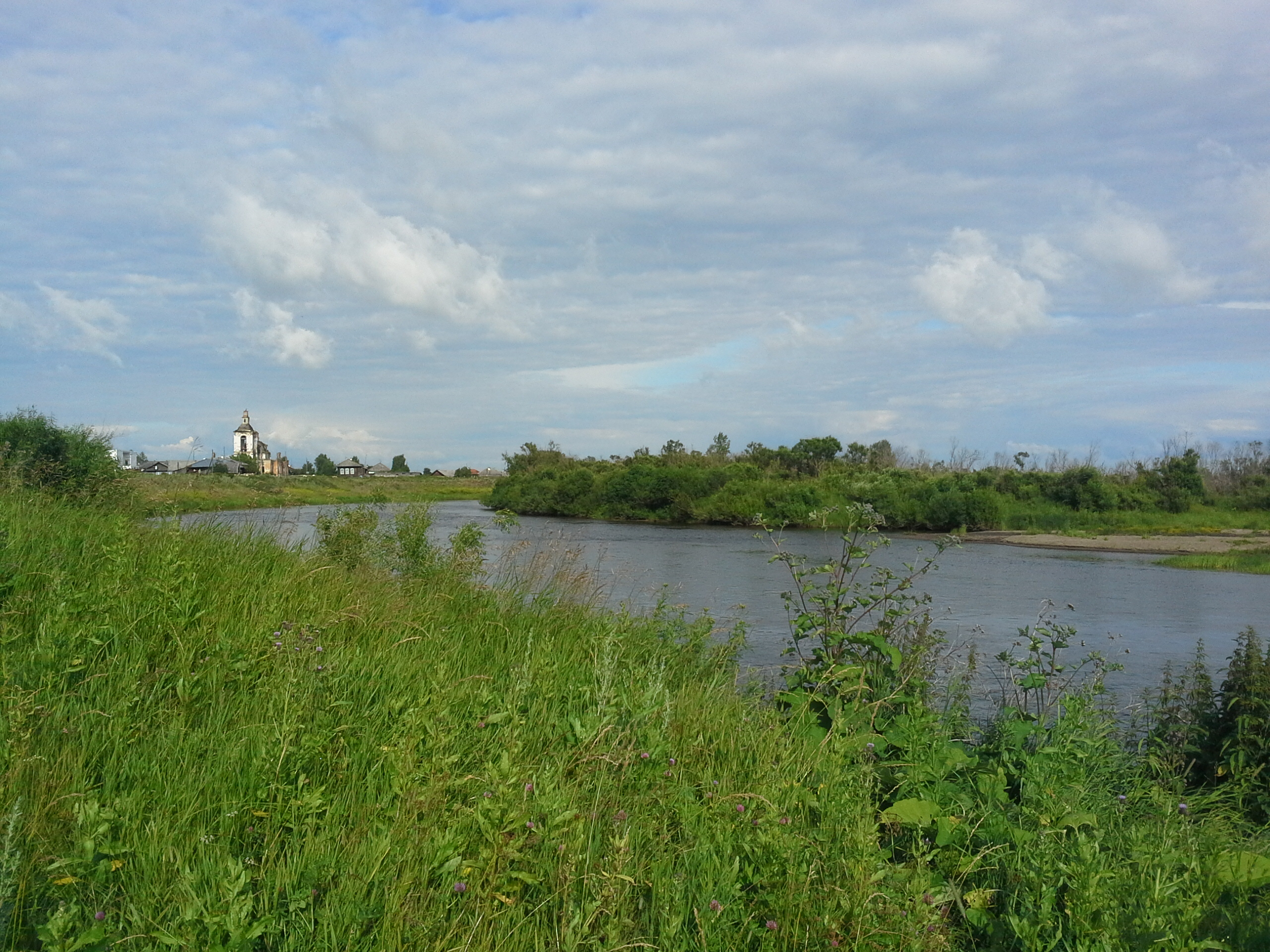

- Tura basin

Location
- Country: Russia

Physical characteristics
- Mouth: Tura
  - coordinates: 57°28′28″N 64°32′21″E
- Length: 262 km (163 mi)
- Basin size: 22,300 km^{2} (8,600 sq mi)

Basin features
- Progression: Tura→ Tobol→ Irtysh→ Ob→ Kara Sea
- Tributaries
  - left: Neyva
  - right: Rezh, Irbit

The Nitsa (Russian: Ница́) is a river in the Sverdlovsk Oblast in Russia. It is a tributary of the Tura. The river commences at the confluence of the Neyva and the Rezh, east of the city Alapayevsk and flows firstly in an easterly and then in southeasterly direction. It is 262 kilometres (163 mi) long. However, if the Nitsa and Neyva are counted as one, the river is 556 kilometres (345 mi) long. It has a drainage basin of 22,300 square kilometres (8,600 sq mi). The Nitsa converges with the Tura at Ust-Nitsinskoye.

The river has a mixed supply, which is dominated by snow. The discharge 165 kilometres (103 mi) downstream from the start, at the city of Irbit, is 42.5 cubic metres per second (1,500 cu ft/s). The river is usually frozen by the end of October, beginning of November until the end of April. The river is navigable along its entire length. The most important tributary is the Irbit, which joins at the city of the same name.
