= Little Sosva Nature Reserve =

Strict nature reserve in Khanty-Mansi Autonomous Okrug, Russia

- Russian: Малая Сосьва заповедник (Also: Malaya Sosva)
- IUCN category Ia (strict nature reserve)
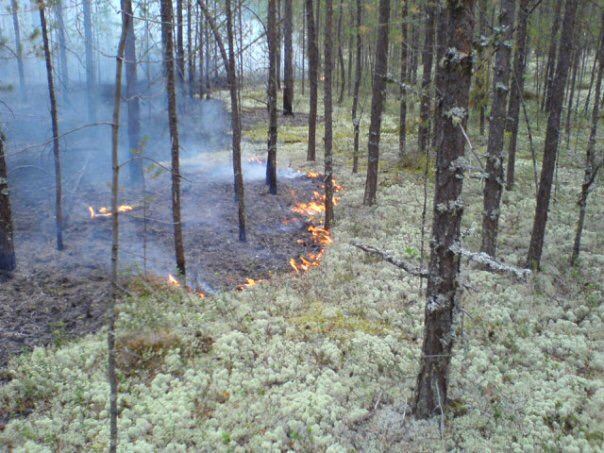
- Forest fire in Little Sosva Reserve

- Location within Russia
- Location: Khanty-Mansi Autonomous Okrug
- Nearest city: Sovetsky
- Coordinates: 62°4′59″N 62°5′47″E
- Area: 225,562 hectares (557,376 acres; 871 sq mi)
- Established: 1976
- Governing body: Ministry of Natural Resources and Environment (Russia)
- Website: http://www.m-sosva.ru/

Little Sosva Nature Reserve (Russian: Малая Сосьва заповедник) (also Malaya Sosva) is a Russian 'zapovednik' (strict ecological reserve) covering the basin of the Malaya Sosva River, on the east side of the Northern Ural Mountains in the territory of the West Siberian Plain. the Malaya Sosva is a right tributary of the North Sosva River, which flows into the Ob River on its way north to the Kara Sea. Are area of forested wetlands, the reserve protects flat lowlands with a broken relief, a significant incision of river valleys, and a developed river system. The reserve also protect cultural and architectural sites, including some related to the indigenous Khanty people. The southern two-thirds of the reserve is in the Sovetsky district in the Khanty-Mansi Autonomous District of Khanty-Mansi Autonomous Okrug; the northern sector is in the Beryozovsky District. The reserve was created in 1976, and covers an area of 225,562 ha (870.90 sq mi).

== Topography ==
The Little Sosva Reserve terrain is of one extensive wetlands around a complex system of meandering rivers. The land is flat, cut with valleys and ridges by the rivers. The territory is about 85 km from north to south, and 23 km from west to east, with the Malaya Sosva river running up the middle. About 400 km of the middle and upper reaches of the Malaya Sosva are within the borders (the river is a total of 700 km long). In its upper reaches, the river is about 20 meters wide, and about 50 meters wide in the lower areas. The meandering riverbed is boulder-pebble with many sandbars and cliffs at the turns, and rapids in places where the course narrows. The highest ground in the territory is 154 meters above sea level. About 15% of the reserve is covered by marshes. Along the western and southern borders is a 5–8 km protected buffer zone.

== Climate and ecoregion ==
Little Sosva is located in the West Siberian taiga ecoregion, a region that covers the West Siberian Plain, from the Urals to the Central Siberian Plateau. It is a region of extensive conifer boreal forests, and also extensive wetlands, including bogs and mires.

The climate of Little Sosva is Humid continental climate, cool summer (Köppen climate classification Subarctic climate (Dfc)). This climate is characterized by mild summers (only 1–3 months above 10 °C (50.0 °F)) and cold, snowy winters (coldest month below −3 °C (26.6 °F)). In the Little Sosva Reserve, the average precipitation is 500 mm, the average snow cover is 184 days, and the average frost-free period 90 days from late spring to early autumn.

== Flora and fauna ==
Malaya Sosva is central: its floral communities include species from Europe to the west, the classic taiga (forest, meadow, and marshes) of the West Siberian Plain, some species of the southern steppe, and som of the northern taiga / tundra. The most common tree in the reserve is the Scots pine, a relatively undemanding tree that is resistant to ground fire. 83% of the territory is forest, most of which is pine forest on sandy soil. Siberian spruce (Picea obovata) is found above the lowest valleys, and cedars are found mixed in small numbers. Throughout the reserve, waterlogged downed pine trees support communities of sphagnum moss, bog vegetation, small shrubs (rosemary, blueberries, cranberries) and sedge and grasses). Scientists on the reserve have recorded over 400 species of vascular plants, and more are being discovered every year.

Scientists on the reserve have recorded 38 species of mammals, 209 of birds, 1 species of reptile (the lizard), 2 species of amphibians (The Siberian salamander and Rana frog), 16 species of fish (common species are pike, carp, perch) and many invertebrates. They are mostly typical of the middle taiga of the Western Siberian Plain: Siberian Chipmunk, brown bear, sable, ermine, elk, and grouse

== Ecoeducation and access ==
As a strict nature reserve, the Little Sosva Reserve is mostly closed to the general public, although scientists and those with 'environmental education' purposes can make arrangements with park management for visits. There are a number of 'ecotourist' routes in the reserve, however, that are open to the public, but require permits to be obtained in advance. About 3,000 tourists visit the reserve each year. The main office is in the city of Sovetsky.

== See also ==
- List of Russian Nature Reserves (class 1a 'zapovedniks')
- National parks of Russia
- Protected areas of Russia
