= Kamyana Mohyla =

Archaeological site in Zaporizhzhia Oblast, Ukraine

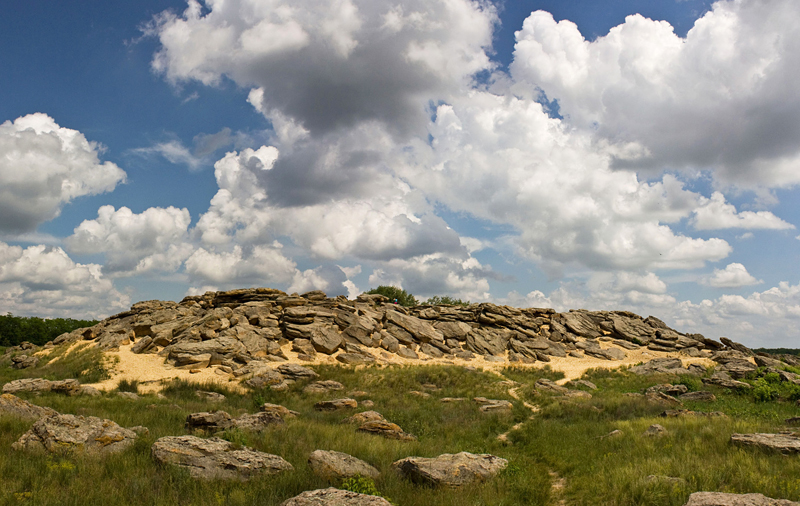
- Kamyana Mohyla in May 2012
- Interactive map of Kamyana Mohyla
- 46°57′0″N 35°28′12″E
- Location: Terpinnia, Melitopol Raion, Zaporizhzhia Oblast, Ukraine

Site notes
- Website: www.stonegrave.org

Immovable Monument of National Significance of Ukraine
- Official name: Культовий комплекс "Кам'яна Могила" (Stone Tomb cult complex)
- Type: Archaeology
- Reference no.: 080011-Н

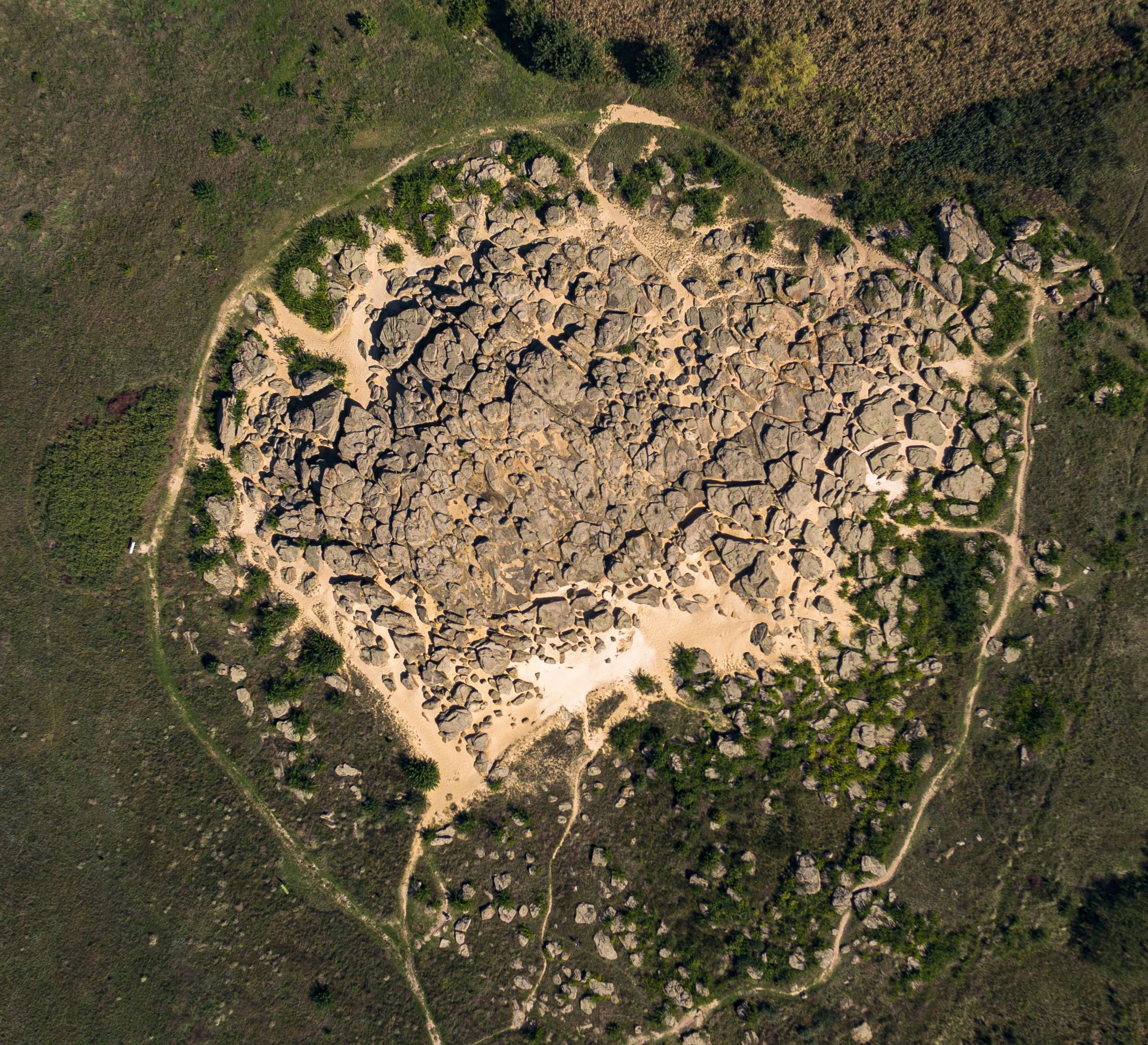
Aerial view of the site

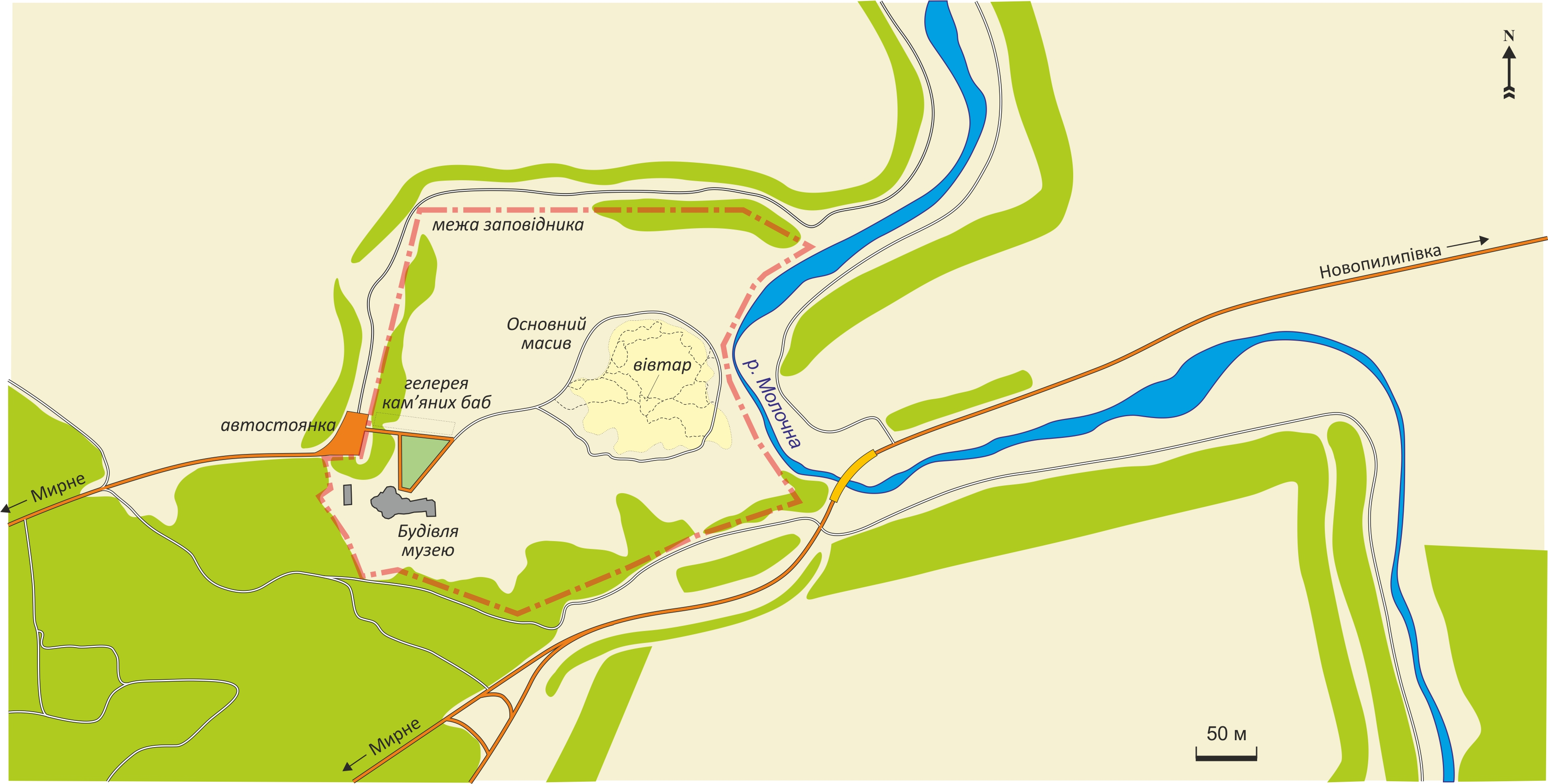
Map of the site

Kamyana Mohyla (Ukrainian: Кам'яна Могила, lit. 'stone grave'; Russian: Каменная Могила, romanized: Kamiennaya Mogila) is an archaeological site in the Molochna River (lit. 'milky river') valley, about a mile from the village of Terpinnia, Zaporizhzhia Oblast, Ukraine. Petroglyphs of Kamyana Mohyla are dated from Upper Paleolithic (Kukrek culture) to Medieval, with Stone Age depictions subjected to most archaeological interest. The site is listed on the Tentative List of World Heritage Sites in Ukraine.

The site encompasses a group of isolated blocks of sandstone, up to twelve meters in height, scattered around an area of some 3,000 sq m. As Noghai legend has it, it resulted from a scuffle of two baghaturs who took turns throwing rocks at each other. In truth, the site had its origins in a sandbank of the Tethys Ocean. For a long time it was an island in the Molochna River, which has since been silted up and now flows a short distance to the west. It is thought to represent the only sandstone outcrop in the Azov-Kuban Depression. The shape of this sand hill is similar to that of kurgans that dot the Pontic–Caspian steppe.

Petroglyphs are found only inside the caves and grottoes of Kamyana Mohyla, many of them still filled up with sand. No adequate protection from the elements has been provided to this day. Few traces of ancient human settlement have been discovered in the vicinity, leading many scholars to believe that the hill might have served as a remote sanctuary. Faint traces of red paint remain on parts of the surface. Scholars have been unable to agree whether the petroglyphs date from Mesolithic or Neolithic.

== History ==
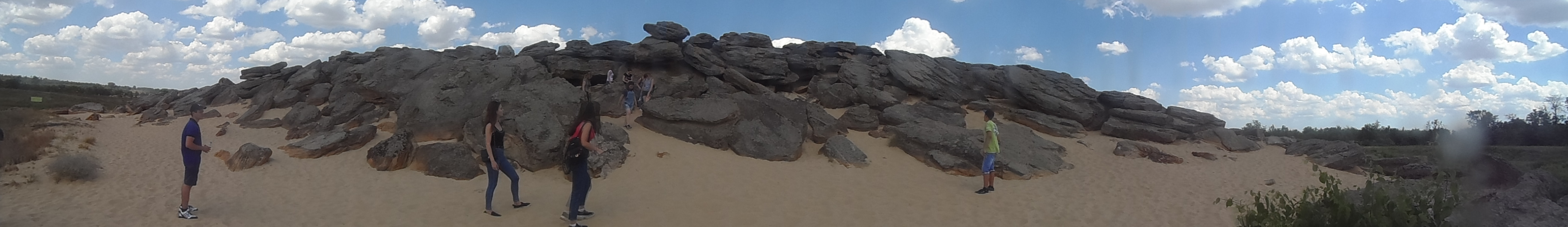
Monument

In 1889, the Russian archaeologist Nikolay Veselovsky was called upon to explore the enigmatic site and started excavations the following year. As soon as he concluded that the site was a burial mound, excavations were terminated. There was very little scientific exploration of the site during the first third of the 20th century.

In the 1930s, the site was investigated by a team of scholars from Melitopol under Valentin Danylenko (1913–82). The young archaeologist claimed to have discovered thirty caves with petroglyph inscriptions which he dated from the 20th century BC to the 17th century AD. Danylenko resumed his work on the site after World War II and claimed to have discovered thirteen additional caves with petroglyphs.

The site was designated an archaeological preserve in 1954. The move was intended to prevent the area from being flooded after construction of a water reservoir. During the following decades, the condition of petroglyphs visibly deteriorated.

In 2006, the government of Ukraine nominated the site for inscription on the World Heritage List. On the whole, the Stone Tomb images represent traces of religious exercises of the hunters and cattle-breeders of this steppe zone of southeast Europe from the 20th century BC to the 17th century AD. Some caves are of artificial origin; their cultural strata have been fixed as the Neolithic, Bronze and Early Iron Ages as well as of Middle Ages.

Engravings inside the Bull Grotto (the drawing have sometimes been considered to be a mammoth) at Kamyana Mohyla have been studied in the 21st Century using digital tools.

== Gallery ==
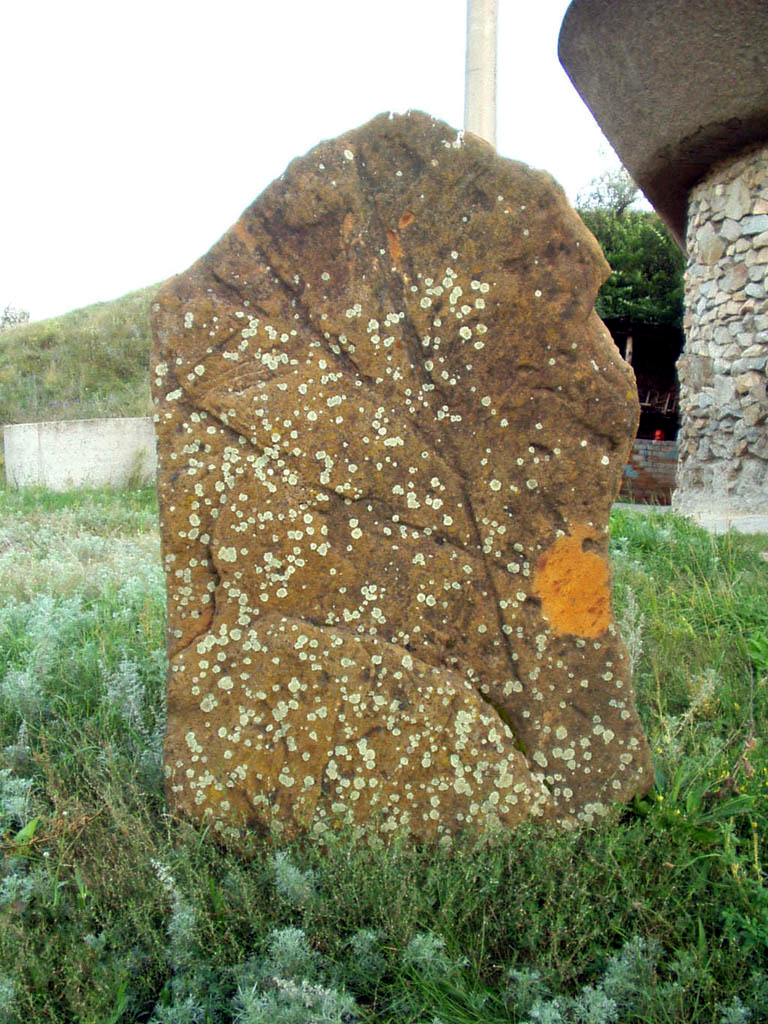
A stone with petroglyphs

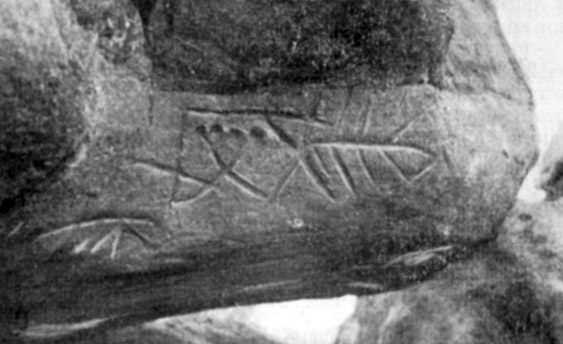

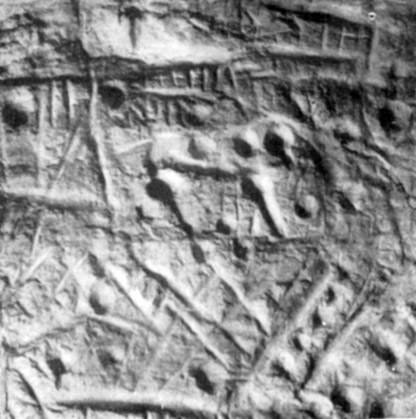

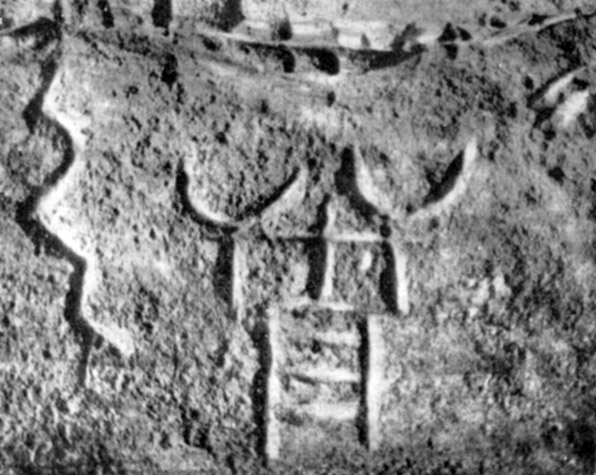

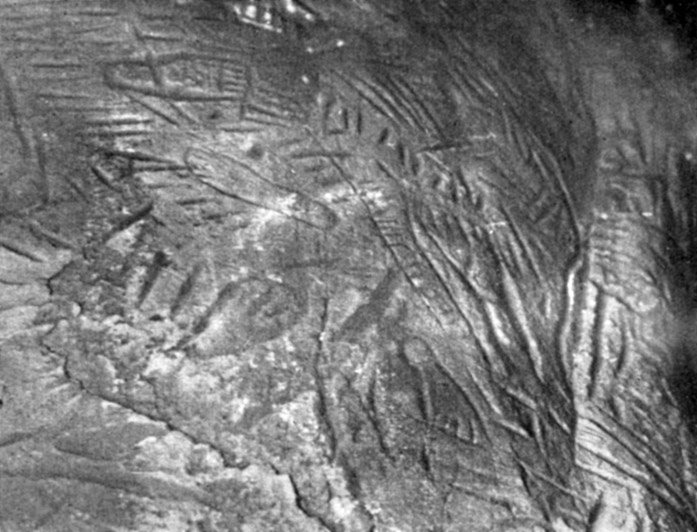

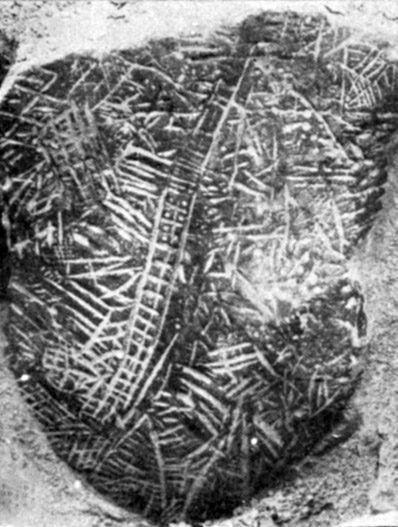

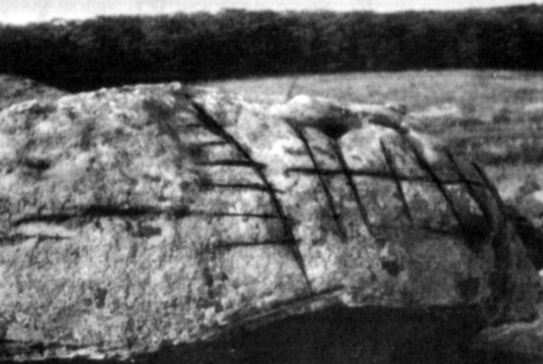

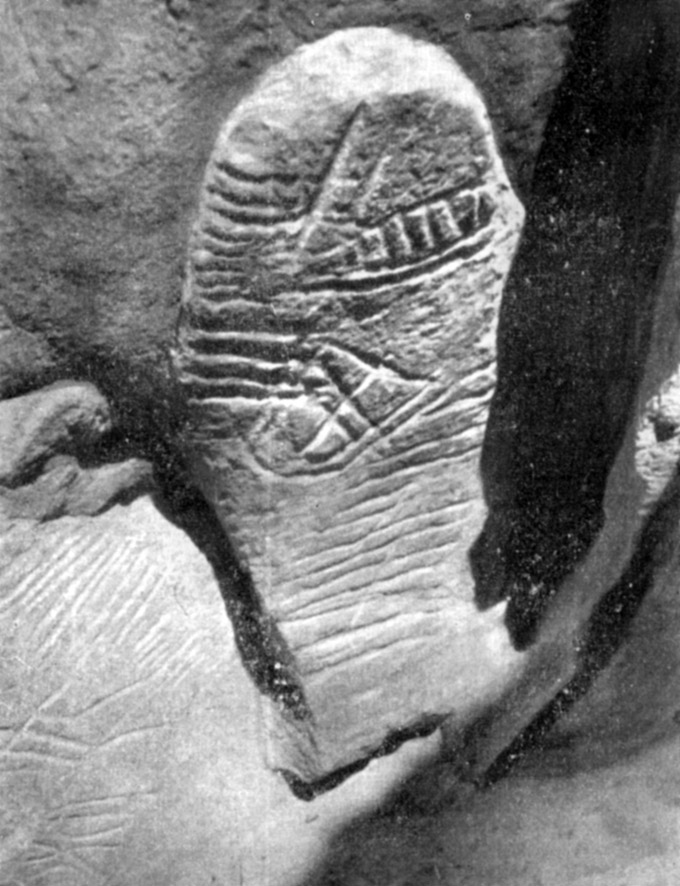

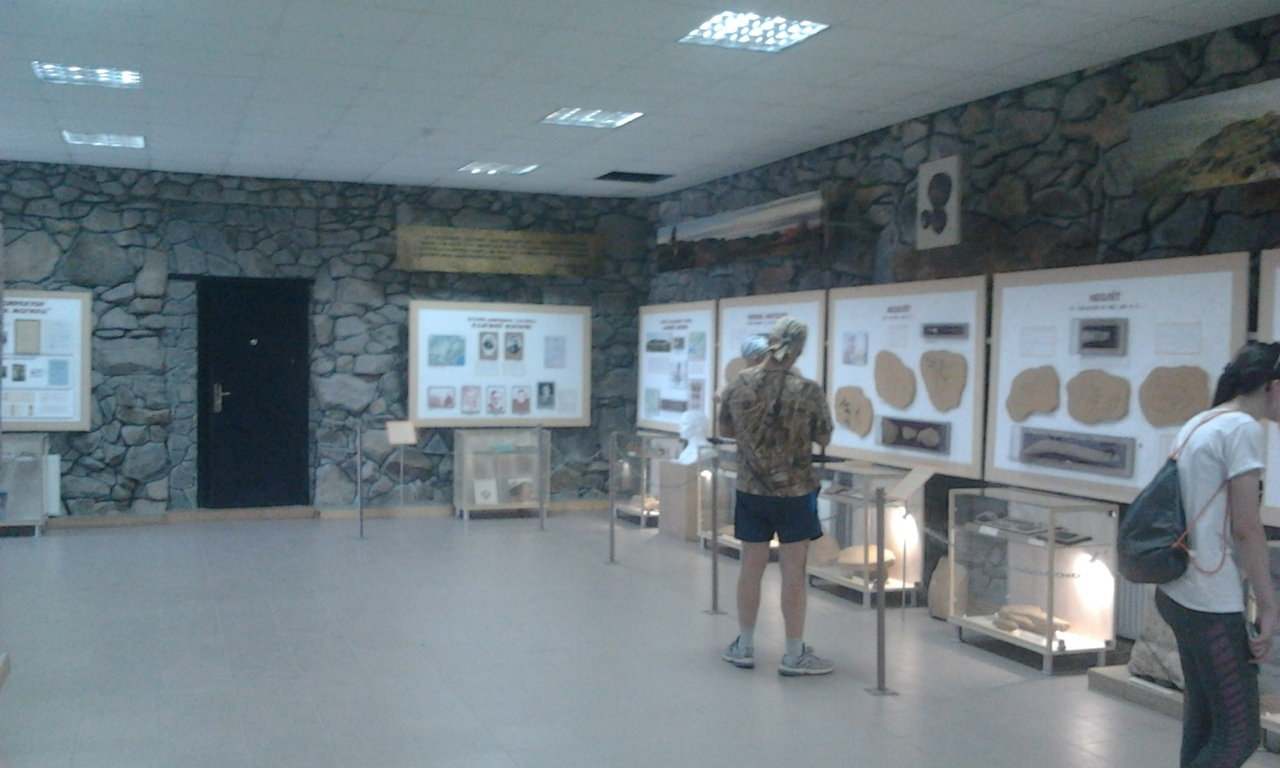
Museum

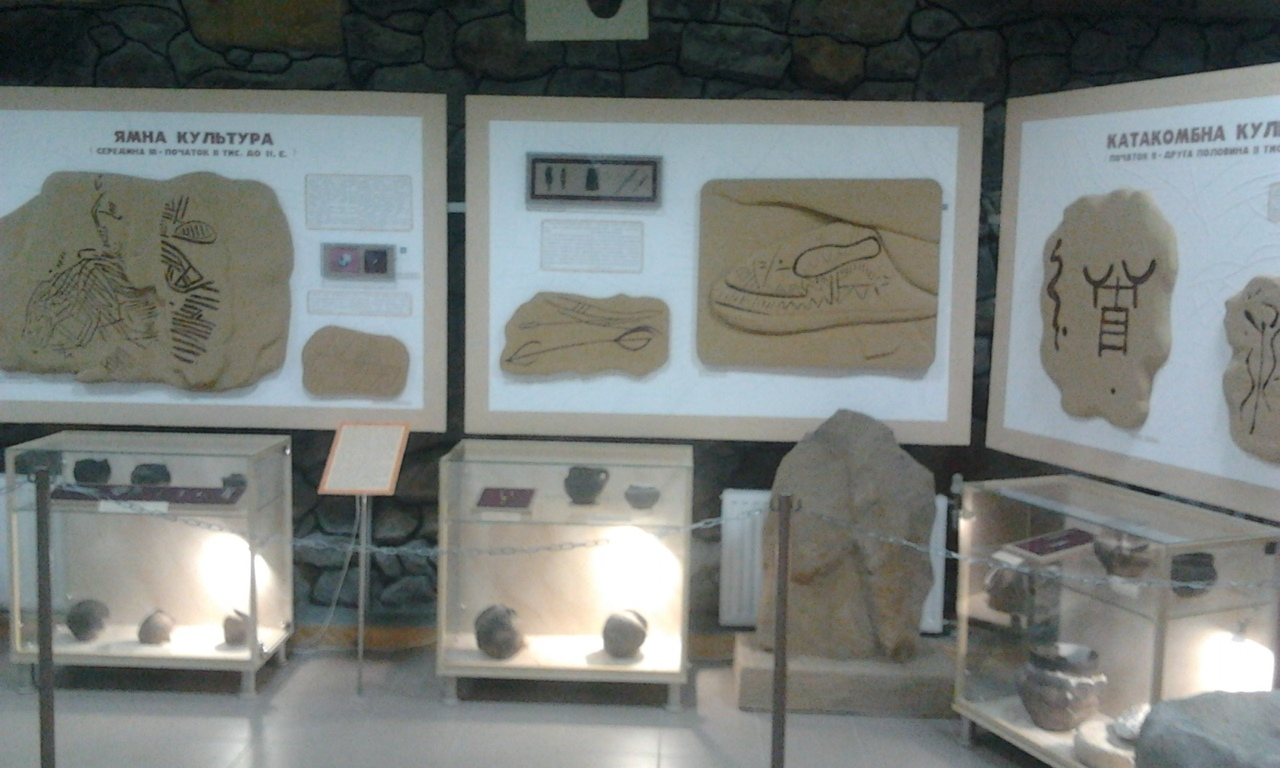
Museum

== See also ==
- Ural characters
- Vinča signs
- Stonehenge
