= West Siberian taiga =

Ecoregion which covers the West Siberian Plain in Russia

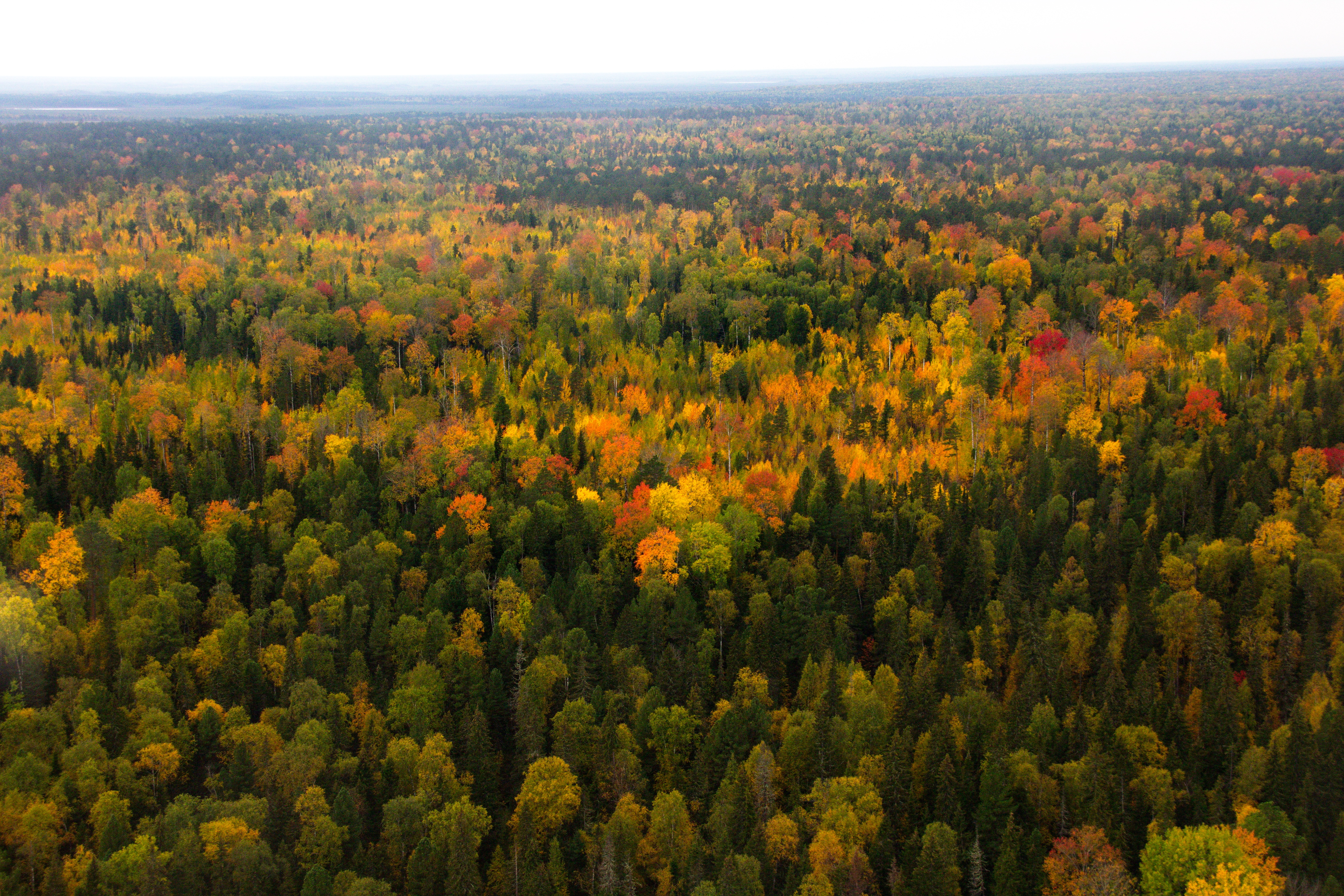
- Yugansky Nature Reserve, in the south-center of the region

- Ecoregion territory (in purple)

Ecology
- Realm: Palearctic
- Biome: boreal forests/taiga

Geography
- Area: 1,670,283 km^{2} (644,900 mi^{2})
- Country: Russia
- Elevation: 100- 300 meters
- Rivers: Ob River
- Climate type: Dfc Humid continental climate, cool summer

The West Siberian taiga ecoregion (WWF ID: PA0611) covers the West Siberian Plain in Russia, from the Ural Mountains in the west to the Yenisei River in the east, and roughly from 56° N to 66° N latitude. It is a vast, flat lowland region of boreal forests (taiga), and wetlands (40% of the region is swamps and bogs), covering an area about 1,800 km west–east, by 1,000 km north–south.

Also known as the Siberian Lowlands, the region is a large sink for atmospheric carbon dioxide, both in the forests and boggy peatlands. It is also a source of methane gas. The peatlands of Western Siberia are the most extensive in the world, covering an area the size of Texas.

== Location and description ==
The ecoregion is centered on the West Siberian Plain, a flat lowland that only ranges from 100 meters to 300 meters above sea level. The western edge of the region is the Urals mountains, and the western half of the region is dominated by the Ob River and its main tributary the Irtysh River. The eastern boundary is traditionally held to the just west of the Yenisei River, which runs south to north, beyond which is the East Siberian taiga ecoregion, which is colder and more rugged in terrain. The southern edge of the region lies north of the belt of temperate forests and forest-steppe that runs along the Trans-Siberian Railway.

Because the West Siberian ecoregion is thus outside of the normal agricultural and developed strip of southern Russia, it is sparsely populated, although the city of Yekaterinburg is at the extreme southwest corner of the region. The city of Surgut is the largest city in the interior (with an estimated 450,000 inhabitants). To the north is the tundra of the Yamal-Gydan tundra ecoregion (covering the Ob River estuary and related peninsulas).

To the north is the tundra, with a tree line transition zone that is about 100 km of gradually thinning tree cover. To the south is the forest-steppe and steppe belt supports most of the population and agriculture of Siberia, and that runs along the northern edge of the Altai Mountains. The region is in the Palearctic realm (Euro-Siberian region), with a (Dfb) climate. It covers 1,670,283 km^{2} (644,900 sq mi).

== Climate ==
Located away from the Atlantic Ocean, and the center of Eurasian landmass, the climate of the Western Siberian Plain is mildly continental. The climate is affected by the pressure systems of the Siberian High, which brings dry, cold winters, and the Asiatic Low, which supports relatively warmer (but still cool) summers. Under the Köppen climate classification system, the ecoregion is Subarctic climate (Dfc)), also called a 'boreal climate', a classification which is characterized by long, cold winters and short, cool summers.

Temperatures also range by latitude across the region. In January, average temperatures range from −15 °C (5 °F) in the southwest to −30 °C (−22 °F) in the northwest. In the summer, the range is from 20 °C (68 °F) in the south to 10 °C (50 °F) in the north. Because the terrain is flat, cold air masses from the Arctic can penetrate deeply.

50 miles east of Surgut, Russia

Climate chart (precipitation, max. and min. temperature)
J	F	M	A	M	J	J	A	S	O	N	D
1 1 −15	0.7 5 −12	0.7 20 0	1.1 35 19	1.6 50 32	2.6 65 47	2.9 71 54	3.2 65 49	2.1 53 39	1.8 35 24	1.5 16 2	1.2 4 −11
- █ Average max. and min. temperatures in °F
- █ Precipitation totals in inches
- Source: GlobalSpecies.org [http://www.globalspecies.org/weather_stations/climate/511/303
Metric conversion
J	F	M	A	M	J	J	A	S	O	N	D
25 −17 −26	18 −15 −25	18 −7 −18	28 2 −8	41 10 0	66 18 9	74 22 12	81 18 10	53 12 4	46 2 −4	38 −9 −16	30 −15 −24
- █ Average max. and min. temperatures in °C
- █ Precipitation totals in mm

To the north of the ecoregion, the climate grades to a Tundra climate), where no month's daily average temperature rises above 10 °C (50 °F) and tall woody vegetation is not supported. To the south of the ecoregion in forest-steppe transition, the climate grades to Humid continental climate (Koppen Dfa), where the temperature variations, seasonally and diurnally, are wider and the precipitation throughout the year is more evenly distributed.

== Flora ==
The Russian ecologist V.V. Alexin stated that "in general taiga in the western siberian sense has three principal characteristics: strong shade, swampiness, and absence of elements of the broad-leaf forests". Poor drainage inhibits some forest growth. Dark taiga (Siberian spruce, Siberian fir and Siberian pine) is mostly found in ribbons along the rivers where the drainage is better.

Because the environment is harsh and there are no mountain refuges in the ecoregion, biodiversity in plants is low. Five tree species dominate: the three 'dark taiga' species (Picea obovata (Siberian spruce), Abies sibirica (Siberian fir), Pinus sibirica (Siberian pine)), and P. sylvestris (Scots pine) and Larix sibirica (Siberian larch).

About 40% of the territory is lowland bogs and marsh. The waterlogged nature of the terrain is due to the flat terrain, the heavy river flows from the south, and the fact that precipitation exceeds evaporation in the region. In the southwest of the region is the Vasyugan Swamp, one of the largest swamps in the world, with peat extending to an average depth of 2.3 meters.

In the north towards the transition zone to tundra, the canopy opens and the trees become more stunted and separated, with lichen cover in between. North of about 60° N latitude is the zone of isolated or sporadic permafrost; continuous permafrost is encountered only north of the ecoregion.

== Fauna ==
There are 80 species of mammals in the ecoregion, but none of them are endemic (found only in Western Siberia). Large numbers of birds migrate to the area each year, but relatively few species stay year-round.

== Protections ==
Notable protected areas of the Russian Federation in the West Siberian taiga include:

- Denezhkin Kamen Nature Reserve An IUCN class Ia "strict ecological reserve" (a Zapovednik). (Area: 782 km^{2})
- Ilmen Nature Reserve. An IUCN class Ia "strict ecological reserve" (a Zapovednik). (Area: 344 km^{2})
- Little Sosva Nature Reserve. An IUCN class Ia "strict ecological reserve" (a Zapovednik). (Area: 2,256 km^{2})
- Pripyshminskiye Bory National Park. An IUCN class II "national park". A pine and birch forest complex in the southwest corner of the ecoregion. (Area: 490 km^{2})
- Central Siberia Nature Reserve. An IUCN class Ia "strict ecological reserve" (a Zapovednik). (Area: 10,215 km^{2})
- Upper Taz Nature Reserve. An IUCN class Ia "strict ecological reserve" (a Zapovednik). (Area: 6,313 km^{2})
- Yugansky Nature Reserve. An IUCN class Ia "strict ecological reserve" (a Zapovednik). (Area: 6,486 km^{2})

== Threats ==
The most immediate threat is posed by the very large oil and gas reserves found under the area; pollution from extraction and processing activities are a threat to the wetland environments in particular.

== Urban areas and settlements ==
The only major city in the Western Siberian taiga ecoregion is Yekaterinburg, and that city is in the extreme southwestern corner of the region. Just outside the southern border are the cities of Chelyabinsk, Tyumen, Tomsk, and Krasnoyarsk. The city of Surgut is the largest city in the center of the ecoregion. Otherwise, the region is very sparsely populated. There are few major transportation lines across the region; transportation has historically been on the Ob River and Irtysh River.

== See also ==
- List of ecoregions in Russia
