= Titanium Valley =

Coordinates: 58°02′44″N 60°33′12″E

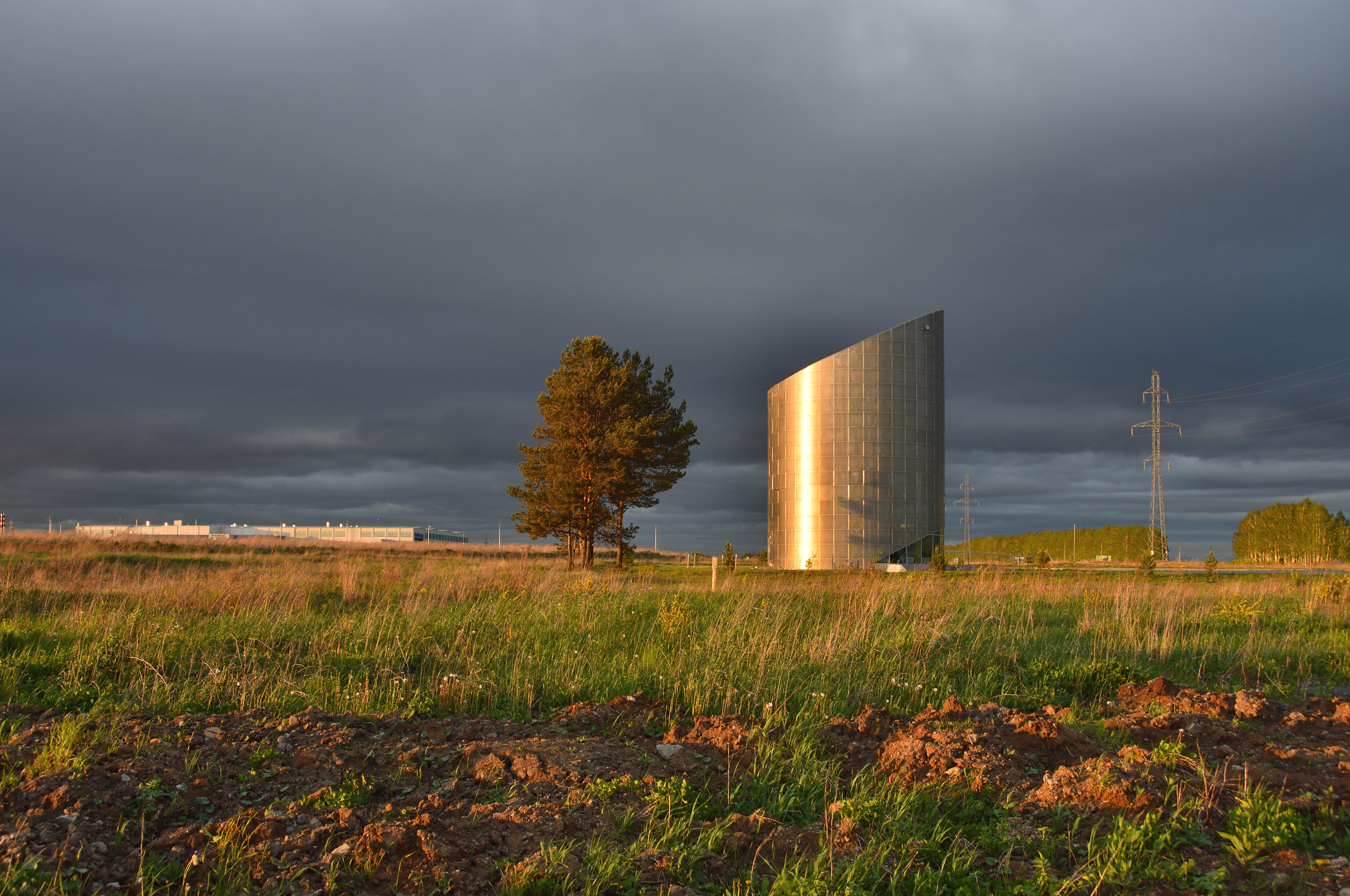
Building in Titanium Valley

Titanium Valley is a special economic zone in Sverdlovsk Oblast in the Urals Federal District of Russia, which will focus on creating titanium products for the aircraft, automotive, shipbuilding and medical industries. It will be created around the world's largest titanium producer, VSMPO-Avisma. In 2010 the Russian government planned to invest at least 40 billion rubles ($1.29 billion) for the project.

== History ==
The purpose of the special economic zone, to be located in the city of Verkhnyaya Salda at Sverdlovsk Oblast, Russia, 624763, is to give enterprises the opportunity to develop and produce value added products in the region and bring international partners to the zone. A total of 20 companies will participate in the project, and it is expected to create 20,000 jobs in the city. The participating companies include VSMPO-Avisma, Arvi, SR Systematics, MAG, and United Aircraft Corporation. Companies operating in the zone will enjoy preferential tax treatment, and Governor of Sverdlovsk Oblast Aleksandr Misharin has stated that he expects the incentives to enable the companies to produce globally competitive products and create new jobs.

While visiting the region, Prime Minister Vladimir Putin said on 13 November 2010 that a decree for creating the special economic zone will be signed in two weeks. Foreign companies considering to create production facilities in the zone include Rolls-Royce Group and Goodrich Corporation.

The Titanium Valley project is part of Russia's ongoing effort to modernise and diversify its economy, one of the main programs of Dmitry Medvedev's presidency.
