= Neyva =

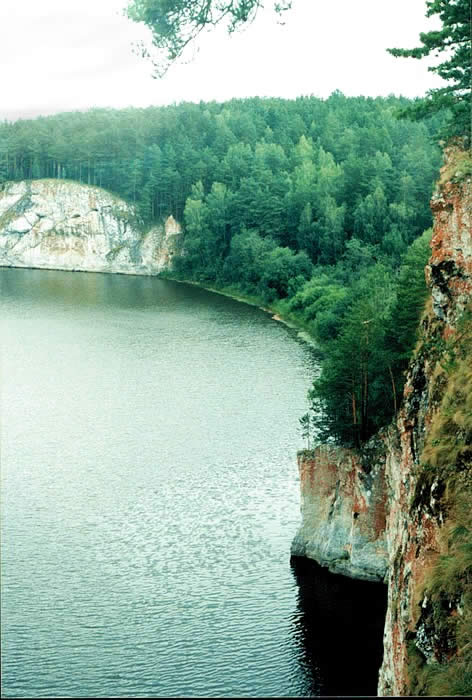

- Tura basin

Location
- Country: Russia

Physical characteristics
- Mouth: Nitsa
  - coordinates: 57°54′42″N 62°18′39″E
- Length: 294 km (183 mi)
- Basin size: 5,600 km^{2} (2,200 sq mi)

Basin features
- Progression: Nitsa→ Tura→ Tobol→ Irtysh→ Ob→ Kara Sea

The Neyva (Russian: Нейва) is a river in the Sverdlovsk Oblast of Russia, which flows out of Lake Tavatuy along the slopes of the Ural Mountains through the urban-type settlement Verkh-Neyvinsky and the towns of Nevyansk and Alapaevsk. It is 294 kilometres (183 mi) long, and has a drainage basin of 5,600 square kilometres (2,200 sq mi). The upper reaches are punctuated by a series of lakes and reservoirs that cover 72.4 square kilometres (28.0 mi^{2}). At its confluence with the Rezh, the Nitsa (a tributary of the Tura) is formed.
