= Verkhnyaya Salda =

Town in Sverdlovsk Oblast, Russia

Verkhnyaya Salda Ве́рхняя Салда́
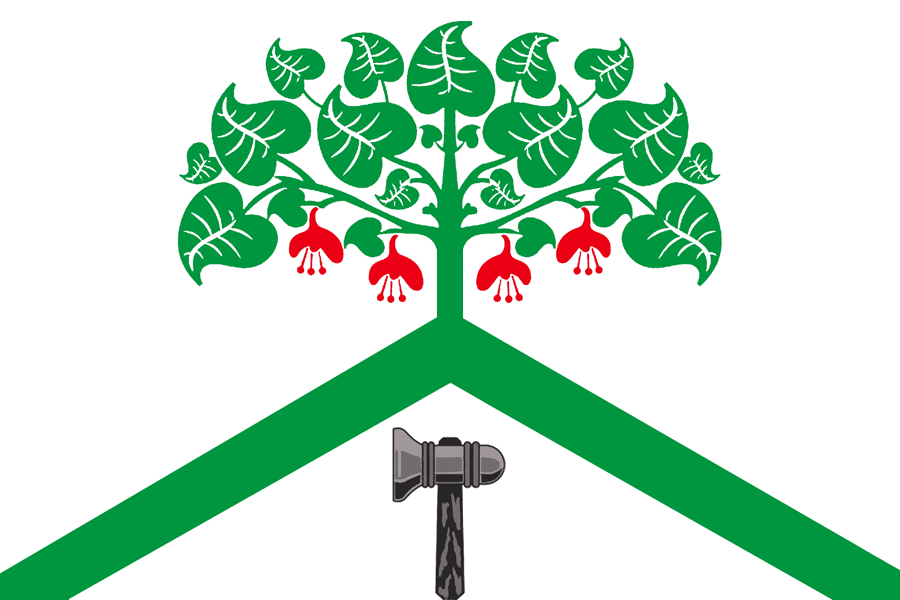
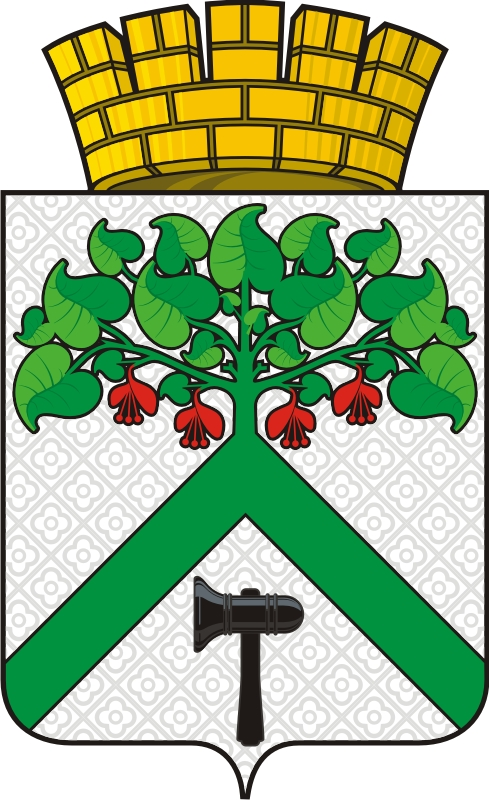
- Flag Coat of arms
- Interactive map of Verkhnyaya Salda
- Location of Verkhnyaya Salda Verkhnyaya Salda (Sverdlovsk Oblast)
- Coordinates: 58°03′N 60°33′E
- Country: Russia
- Federal subject: Sverdlovsk Oblast
- Administrative district: Verkhnesaldinsky District
- Founded: 1778
- Elevation: 200 m (660 ft)

Population (2010 Census)
  - Total: 46,221
  - Estimate (2025): 39,766 (−14%)
- Time zone: UTC+5 (MSK+2)
- Postal code: 624760
- OKTMO ID: 65708000001

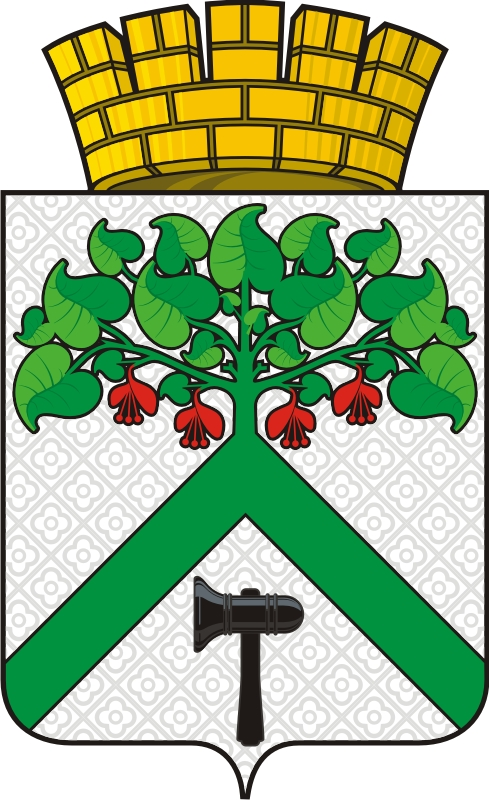
Coat of arms of Verkhnyaya Salda

Verkhnyaya Salda (Russian: Ве́рхняя Салда́) is a town in Sverdlovsk Oblast, Russia, located on the Salda River (right tributary of the Tagil), 195 kilometers (121 mi) north of Yekaterinburg. Population: 46,221 (2010 census); 51,195 (2002 census); 55,246 (1989 Soviet census).

== History ==
It was founded in 1778; town status was granted to it in 1938. The settlement was founded around iron processing and iron cast factories. It attracted local population in search of jobs.

Further impulse of the industry development occurred during the WWII: in July 11, 1941 the Committee of Defense decided to evacuate design bureaus, technical archive and machinery from Leningrad to Verkhnyaya Salda.

== Economy ==
Verkhnaya Salda is known for its Titanium Valley metallurgical plant owned by VSMPO-AVISMA Corporation, the world's largest producer of titanium.
