= Pripyshminskiye Bory National Park =

National park in Russia

Pripyshminskiye Bor National Park
- Припышминские Боры (Russian)
- IUCN category II (national park)
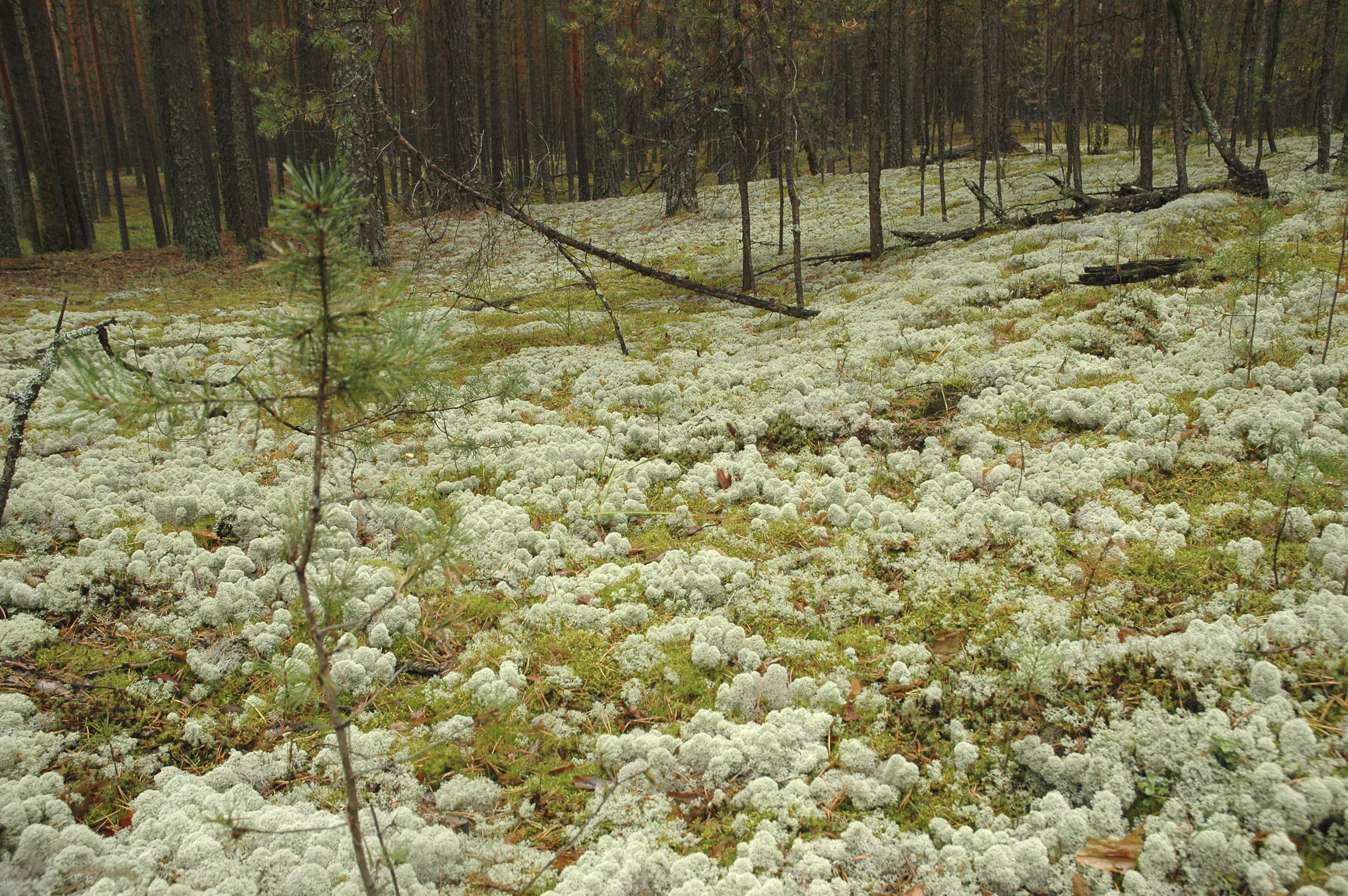

- Location within Russia
- Location: Tugulymsky District of Sverdlovsk Oblast
- Nearest city: Yekaterinburg
- Coordinates: 56°59′N 63°47′E
- Area: 49,050 hectares (121,205 acres; 490 km^{2}; 189 sq mi)
- Established: 1993
- Governing body: FGBU Pripyshminskiye Bory
- Website: http://www.nppbor.ru/

Pripyshminskiye Bory National Park (Russian: Припышминские Боры; literally "Pyshma Forest") is located in the southwestern corner of the West Siberian Plain. The national park protects a complex of pine and birch forests. About 10% of the area is non-forested marshes, ponds, hayfields and pastures. The park is located in the Sverdlovsk Oblast, 150 km east of the city of Yekaterinburg and 70 miles west of Tyumen. The route of the Trans-Siberian Railroad passes by the two sections of the park.

== Topography ==
The two sections have dark green borders: Tugulymskaya (upper right), Talitsky (lower left)

Pripyshminskiye Bory National Park is divided into two sections. The Talisky section, which is on the right bank of the Pyshma River, is just south and east of the town of Talitsa. It a relatively flat forest of pine, spruce and larch. The second section, Tugulymskaya, is located 20 miles to the northeast, in Tugulymsky District. It has more extensive swamps and wetlands on the floodplains of the Pyshma River, with forest of larch, fir and cedar. Much of this section is swamp, with some higher sandy ground supporting pine forest.

== Ecoregion and climate ==
The terrestrial ecoregion of Pripyshminskiye is West Siberian taiga (WWF ID#611), a region characterized by coniferous forests of pine, spruce and larch. The freshwater ecoregion is classified as "Ob River Basin" (FEOW ID#602), characterized by plains river topography, continental climate, and complexes of freshwater fish that in the lower latitudes include boreal river families such as northern pike, loach and dace.

The climate in the Pripyshminskiye forest is Humid continental climate, warm summer (Köppen climate classification (Dfb)). This climate is characterized by large swings in temperature, both diurnally and seasonally, with mild summers and cold, snowy winters. Precipitation is relatively well distributed through the year; average annual precipitation is 17 inches.

Pripyshminskie forest, Sverdlovsk, Russia

Climate chart (precipitation, max. and min. temperature)
J	F	M	A	M	J	J	A	S	O	N	D
0.8 10 −5	0.6 14 −3	0.6 27 9	0.9 48 29	1.5 64 41	2.1 74 52	3.1 76 56	2.4 71 52	1.7 60 42	1.3 43 29	1.1 26 13	0.9 13 −1
- █ Average max. and min. temperatures in °F
- █ Precipitation totals in inches
- Source: GlobalSpecies.org
Metric conversion
J	F	M	A	M	J	J	A	S	O	N	D
20 −12 −21	15 −10 −20	15 −3 −13	23 9 −2	38 18 5	53 23 11	79 25 13	61 22 11	43 16 5	33 6 −2	28 −4 −10	23 −11 −18
- █ Average max. and min. temperatures in °C
- █ Precipitation totals in mm

== Tourism ==
The park as zones for strict nature protection, for cultural tourism (including several eco-trails), and recreation (such as berry-picking, mushroom collecting). There are developed hiking trails and campsites are available with tent sites and huts. The park also sponsor a nature museum and baths.

== See also ==
- Protected areas of Russia
