= VSMPO-AVISMA =

Metallurgy company

PJSC VSMPO-AVISMA Corporation
- Native name: ПАО "Корпорация ВСМПО-АВИСМА"
- Type: Public Joint Stock Company
- Traded as: MCX: VSMO
- Industry: Metallurgy
- Founded: 1933; 93 years ago
- Headquarters: Verkhnyaya Salda, Russia
- Key people: Nikolay K. Melnikov (Acting General Director)
- Products: Titanium; Aluminum; Magnesium
- Revenue: $1.63 billion (2019)
- Operating income: $361 million (2019)
- Net income: $321 million (2019)
- Total assets: $5.52 billion (2019)
- Total equity: $2.94 billion (2019)
- Number of employees: 19 353
- Website: www.vsmpo.ru

VSMPO-AVISMA Corporation (Russian: ВСМПО-АВИСМА) is a Russian mining company and manufacturer and the world's third-largest producer of titanium sponge. Located in Verkhnyaya Salda, Russia, VSMPO-AVISMA also operates facilities in Ukraine, England, Switzerland, Germany, United States. The company produces titanium, aluminum, magnesium and steel alloys. VSMPO-AVISMA does a great deal of business with aerospace companies around the world. As of February 2022, VSMPO produced 90% of titanium in Russia and exported it to 50 countries all over the globe.

VSMPO is mostly owned by Industrial Investments LLC, whose main owner is the Russian billionaire Mikhail Shelkov.

VSMPO stands for VerkhneSaldinskoye Metallurgicheskoye Proizvodstvennoye Ob'yedineniye (Верхнесалдинское металлургическое производственное объединение, or Metal-producing company of Verkhnyaya Salda; and AVISMA for AVIatsionnyye Spetsial'nyye MAterialy or AVIation Special MAterials).

== History ==
After Rosoboronexport obtained an 66% stake in October 2006 of VSMPO-Avisma, Sergey Chemezov became chairman of VSMPO-AVISMA in November 2006.

On 27 December 2007 US Boeing and VSMPO-AVISMA created a joint venture Ural Boeing Manufacturing (UBM) and signed a contract on titanium products deliveries until 2015. Boeing planned to invest 27 million dollars in the production of titanium parts for its needs.

The company is a key organizer of the Titanium Valley project in Sverdlovsk Oblast.

Despite VSMPO-AVISMA being a Russian company, it was not affected by the American and European sanctions during the first phase of the Russo-Ukrainian War. In December 2020, the company was temporarily included in the American sanction list due to its connections with the Russian Armed Forces, but later the US lifted the sanctions against VSMPO-AVISMA.

In 2020, a criminal case against Mikhail Voevodin had broken out, former CEO of VSMPO-Avisma, about losses from transactions concluded in 2017–2019, when VSMPO-AVISMA sold ferrotitan to Swiss Interlink Metals and Chemicals AG and American Interlink Metals and Chemicals Inc at an undervalued price, and then bought products made from it at an inflated cost.

In November 2021, “VSMPO-AVISMA” and Boeing signed an agreement to increase producing capacity of UBM as well as project investment cost of R&D sector. The agreement maintains the role of “VSMPO-AVISMA” as the biggest titanium supplier for Boeing. Only four months later, following the Russian invasion of Ukraine, the agreement was terminated, as well as a 2007 agreement.

In November 2021, the Arbitration Court of Sverdlovsk Oblast ordered to the company to pay 651 million roubles for pollution on ground area of 347538 square meters pro rata to Federal Service for Supervision of Natural Resources legal action.

Following the Russian invasion of Ukraine in February 2022, several international companies ceased their collaboration with VSMPO-AVISMA. Thus, in March 2022, Rolls-Royce Holdings and Boeing suspended purchasing titanium from the company for an indefinite period.

In 2025, VSMPO-AVISMA filed legal action against American classical pianist and metal trader Igor Raykhelson, accusing him and several other parties of being responsible for the company suffering losses as a result of titanium being sold under market price and being repurchased above market price. Raykhelson has repeatedly denied wrongdoing and described the Russian criminal charges brought against him as “politically motivated” and “retaliatory.”

Specifically, it has been reported that Raykhelson's Swiss-based metal trading firm, Interlink Metals, was unable to make payments to VSMPO's German subsidiary since 2023 due to sanctions imposed on Russian companies following the invasion of Ukraine. Following this, VSMPO revived criminal charges and rewrote their allegations, this time expanding them and naming Raykhelson as part of the case.

In 2025, Raykhelson filed a petition to a Colorado court for VSMPO to share financial records which would disprove the allegations lodged against Interlink and Raykhelson.

He stated the material was intended to support his defense against the Russian fraud charges, which he characterized as retaliatory and connected to the parallel arbitration proceedings brought by Interlink Metals & Chemicals AG against VSMPO-AVISMA in Switzerland.

== Related organizations ==
=== Subsidiaries ===
- URALREDMET, near Yekaterinburg
- CJSC Tube Works VSMPO-AVISMA
  - Nikopol, Ukraine
- VSMPO-Tirus UK
  - Redditch, United Kingdom
  - VSMPO-Tirus UK is VSMPO-AVISMA's sales and distribution centre for UK customers.
- VSMPO – Tirus GmbH
  - Frankfurt-am-Main, Germany
- VSMPO-Tirus US
  - Highlands Ranch, Colorado (Head Office)
  - Leetsdale, Pennsylvania (Eastern production center)
  - Ontario, California (Western production center)
- VSMPO Tirus AG
  - Lausanne, Switzerland
- NF&M International
  - Monaca, Pennsylvania

== Awards ==
- Order of the October Revolution (1983) – for services to the development of the Russian aviation metallurgy
- Order of Lenin (1945) – for selfless work during the Great Patriotic War
- The Red Banner of the State Defense Committee (April 16, 1946)
- Order of the Red Banner of Labour (1971) – for organizing the production of new equipment

== Literature ==
- Liuhto, Kari; Sutyrin, Sergei; Blanchard, Jean-Marc F. (2016). The Russian Economy and Foreign Direct Investment. London: Routledge. ISBN 9781315651101.
