= Yugansky Nature Reserve =

Strict nature reserve in Khanty-Mansi Autonomous Okrug, Russia

- Russian: Юганский заповедник (Also: )
- IUCN category Ia (strict nature reserve)
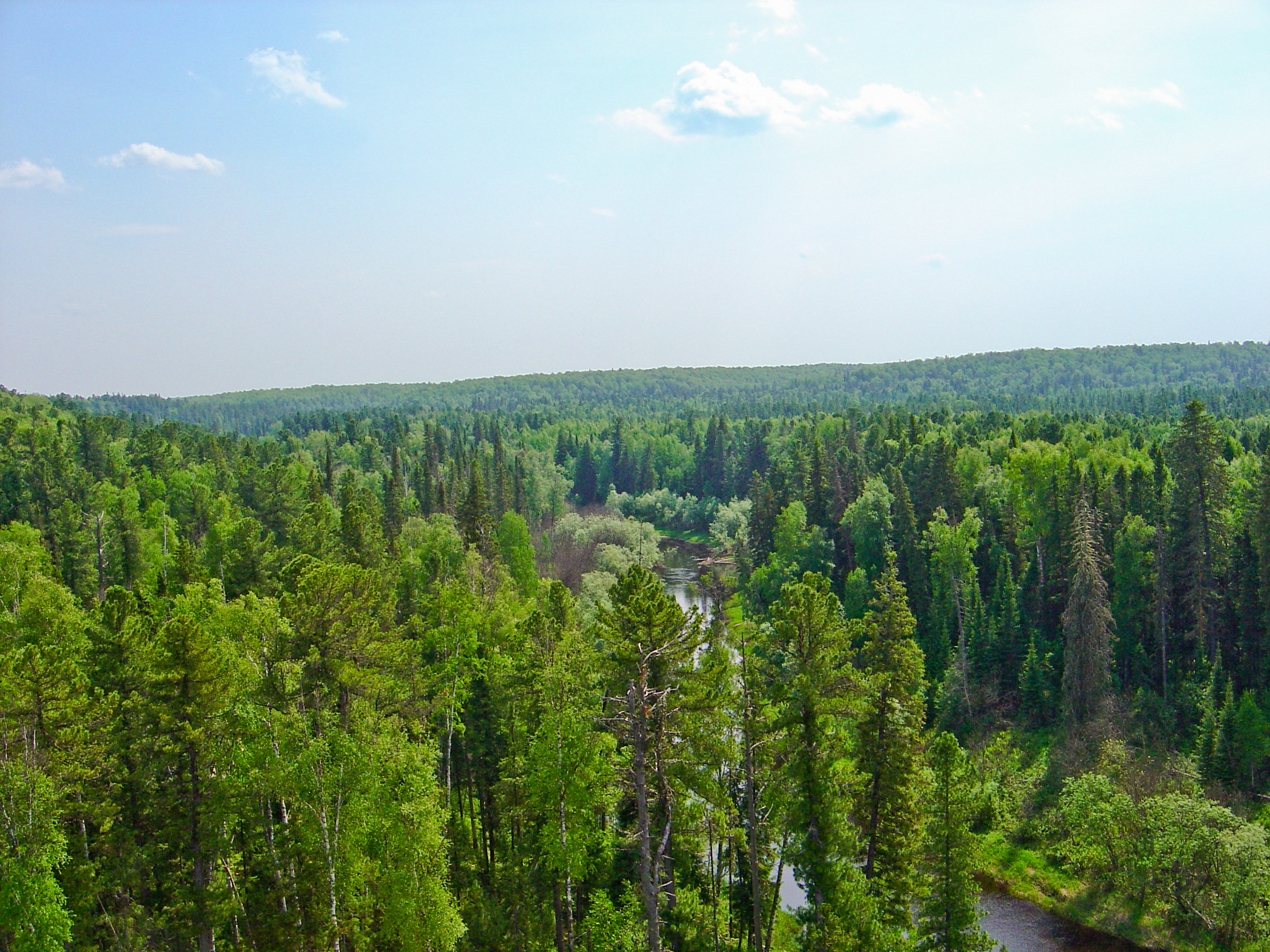
- Yugansky Zapovednik

- Location within Russia
- Location: Khanty-Mansi Autonomous Okrug
- Nearest city: Ugut
- Coordinates: 59°32′21″N 74°37′48″E
- Area: 648,636 hectares (1,602,814 acres; 2,504 sq mi)
- Established: 1982
- Governing body: Ministry of Natural Resources and Environment (Russia)
- Website: https://ugansky.ru/

Yugansky Nature Reserve (Russian: Юганский) (also ) is a Russian 'zapovednik' (strict ecological reserve) in the basin of the Bolshoy Yugan River, a left tributary of the Ob River. The reserve is in the central part of the West Siberian Plain, in the southern part of the Middle Ob lowlands. It is situated in the Surgutsky District of the Khanty-Mansi Autonomous Okrug, about 500 km due north of the city of Omsk. The reserve was created in 1982, and covers an area of 648,636 ha (2,504.40 sq mi).

== Topography ==
The Yugansky Reserve is located in the south Sredneobskaya lowlands. The terrain is mostly narrow river valleys and vast wetlands. Woodlands covered 64% of the protected zones. Forest cover is only 36%; the remainder is swamp.

== Climate and Ecoregion ==
The Yugansky Reserve is located in the West Siberian taiga ecoregion, which covers most of the West Siberian Plain.

The climate of Yugansky is Subarctic climate, without dry season (Köppen climate classification Subarctic climate (Dfc)). This climate is characterized by mild summers (only 1–3 months above 10 °C (50.0 °F)) and cold, snowy winters (coldest month below −3 °C (26.6 °F)). The area is frost-free for 92 days on average, and the growing season is 137 days. Prevailing winds are south-western and southern.

== Flora and fauna ==
The terrain of Yugansky is primarily floodplains, covered by spruce forests with cedar and fir. The reserve is home to 40 species of mammals, more than half of which species are rodents. The large mammals are represented by bear, lynx, and wolverine. Herbivores include elk and forest reindeer.

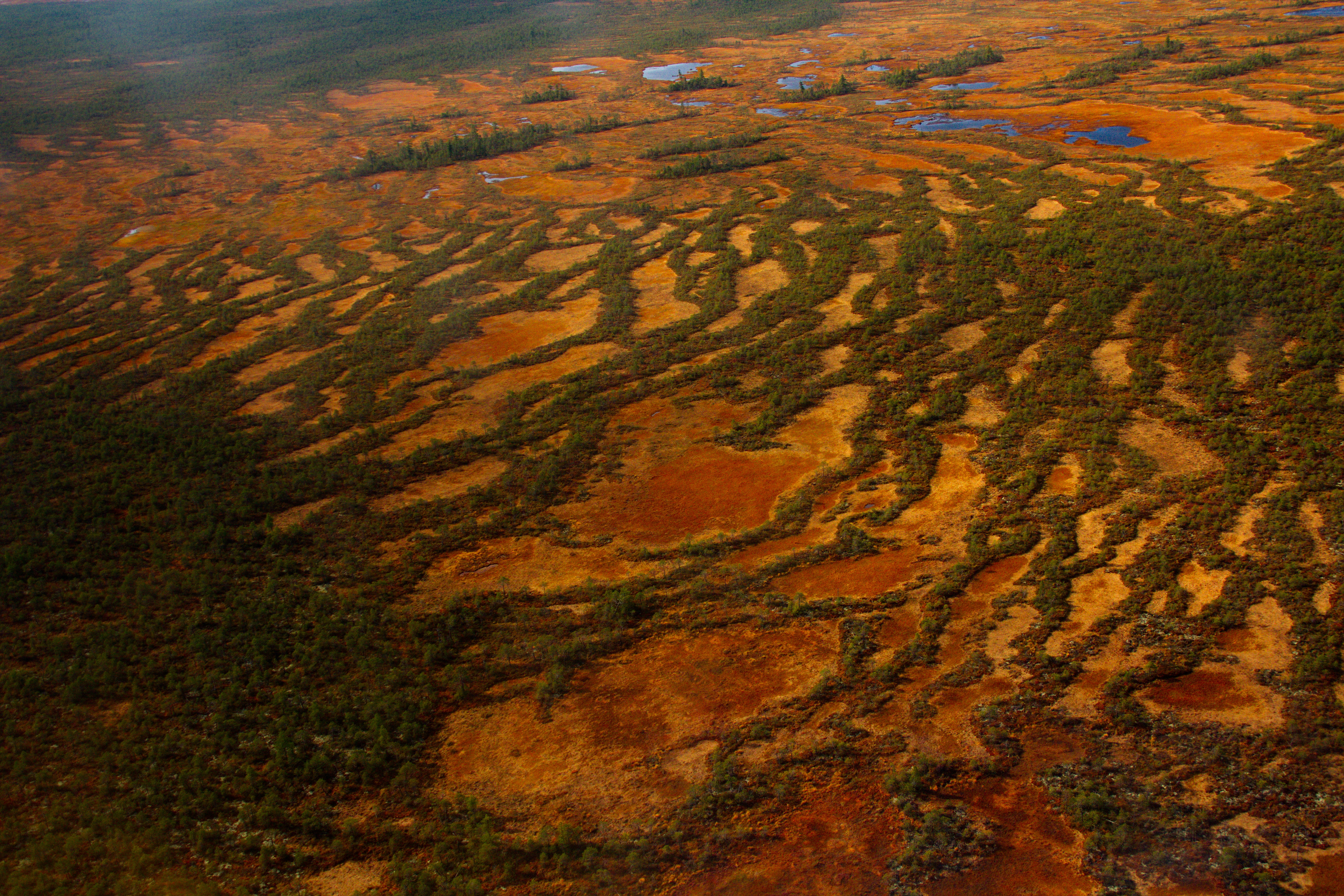
Peatbog, aerial view, Yugansky Nature Reserve

== Ecotourism ==
As a strict nature reserve, the Yugansky Reserve is mostly closed to the general public, although scientists and those with 'environmental education' purposes can make arrangements with park management for visits. There is a small nature museum operated by the reserve in the village for public education. Management has opened an 'ecotourist' route to one of the marsh zones that is open to the public by arrangement in advance. The reserve is remote and far from convenient transportation, however, and expects to conduct most of its eco-education activities through online and virtual media. The main office is in the village of Ugut. The closest city is Surgut, 300 km to the north.

== See also ==
- List of Russian Nature Reserves (class 1a 'zapovedniks')
- National parks of Russia
- Protected areas of Russia
