= Denezhkin Kamen Nature Reserve =

Nature reserve in Sverdlovsk Oblast, Russia

- Russian: Денежкин камень заповедник (Also: Denezhkin Kamen)
- IUCN category Ia (strict nature reserve)
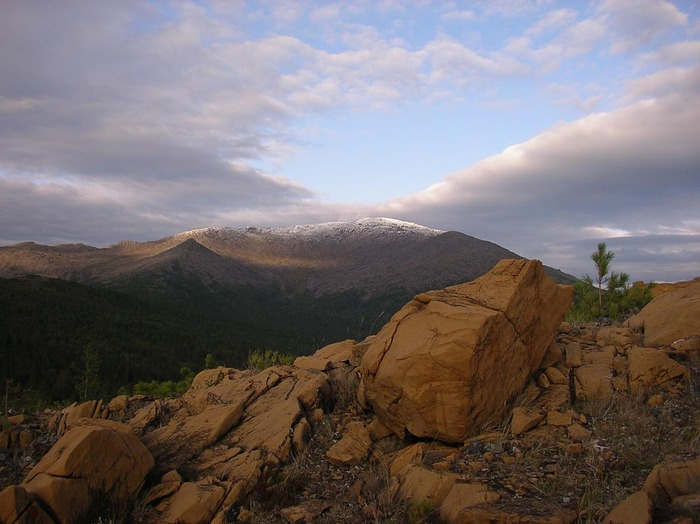
- Denezhkin Kamen ("Denezhkin Stone Mountain")

- Location within Russia
- Location: Sverdlovsk Oblast
- Nearest city: Severouralsk
- Coordinates: 60°30′29″N 59°29′39″E
- Area: 78,192 hectares (193,217 acres; 302 sq mi)
- Established: 1991
- Governing body: Ministry of Natural Resources and Environment (Russia)
- Website: http://www.denkamen.ru/

Denezhkin Kamen Nature Reserve (Russian: Денежкин камень заповедник) (also Denezhkin Kamen) is a Russian 'zapovednik' (strict nature reserve), centered on Denezhkin Stone Mountain, on the eastern slope of the Central Ural Mountains. The mountain is one of the highest peaks in the Urals (altitude of 1,492 metres (4,895 ft)); and most of the reserve's terrain is West Siberian taiga and some tundra. Denezhkin Kamen is the only nature reserve in the Ural east-slope watershed, and protects relatively pristine forest. There are old-growth stands of trees, no settlements, and no logging roads on the site. The reserve is situated about 400 km north of Yekaterinburg, in the Severouralsk city district in the north of Sverdlovsk Oblast.

== Topography ==
Denezhkin Kamen Mountain is about half bare stone (shale and syenite-gneiss); one fourth is forested and the other half scrub and bush. Visitors report a bleak and harsh environment. The mountain supports the headwaters of the Sosva River, which flows into the Tavda River, which flows into the Ob River and ultimately into the Kara Sea to the north. The reserve is on the east slope of the Urals, and looks down to the east towards the West Siberian Plain. The western border of the site runs north–south along the main ridge of the Urals, effectively marking the border between Europe to the west and Asia to the east.

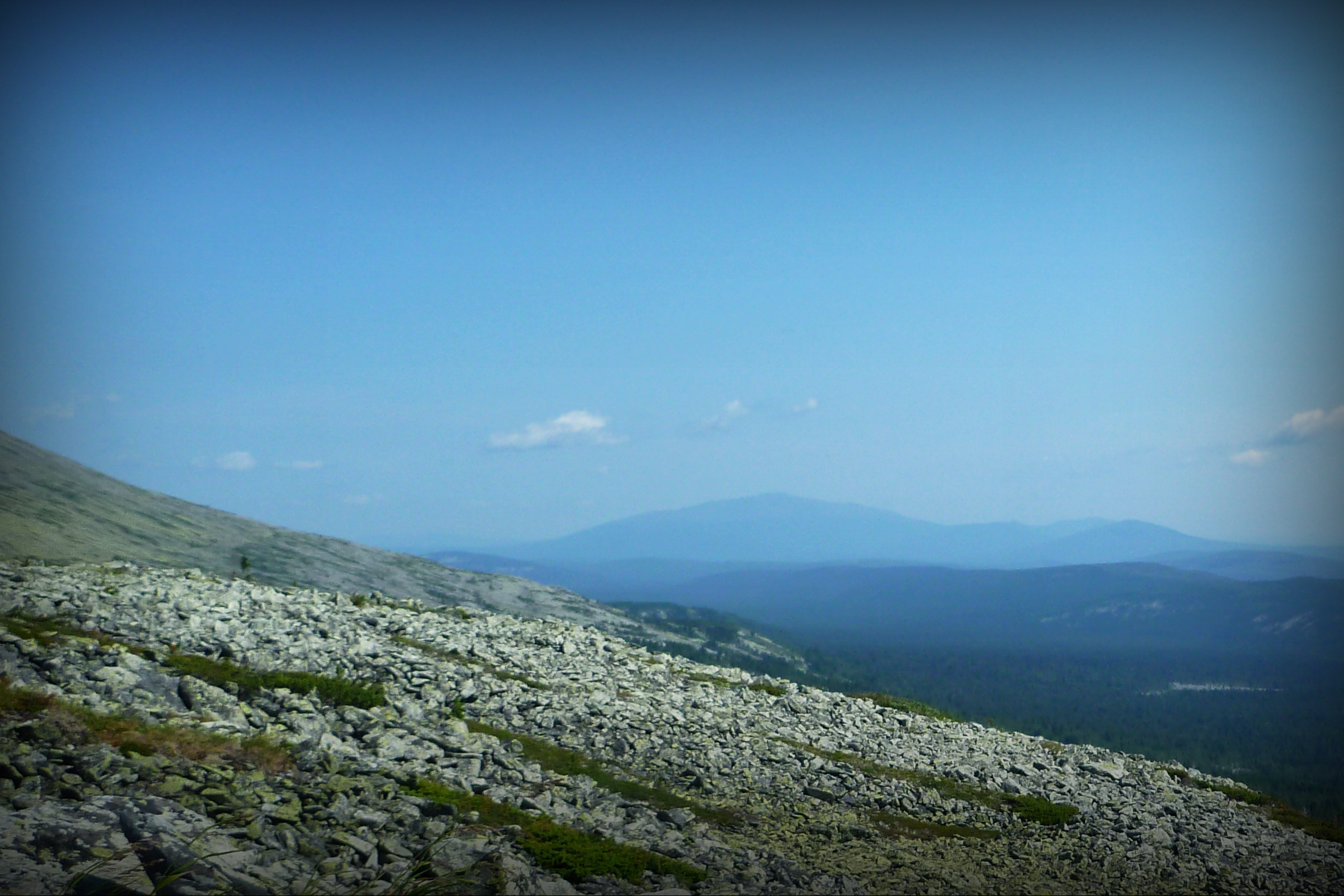
Denezhin Kamen from a height of 981 meters

== Climate and ecoregion ==
Denezhkin Kamen is located in the West Siberian taiga ecoregion, a region that covers the West Siberian Plain, from the Urals to the Central Siberian Plateau.. The entire region is one of extensive conifer boreal forests, and also extensive wetlands, including bogs and mires.

The climate of Denezhkin Kamen is Humid continental climate, cool summer (Köppen climate classification Subarctic climate (Dfc)). This climate is characterized by mild summers (only 1–3 months above 10 °C (50.0 °F)) and cold, snowy winters (coldest month below −3 °C (26.6 °F)). In the Denezhkin Kamen reserve, average temperates in January are −20.3 C degrees; in July 12.9 C degrees.

== Flora and fauna ==
There are three altitude zone of floral communities in the reserve: northern taiga, subalpine (750–850 meters), and bald mountain (above 1,000–1,200 meters). Below the bare mountain areas, the forests are typical of the West Siberian northern taiga: 38% dark coniferous spruce-pine-fir forest, 12% pine forest (in the eastern and southern parts of the reserve), and 35% mixed forest. In the understory, bushes such as rowan and raspberry are common.

Because the reserve is on the border between the west and east side of the Urals, it supports animals from both communities. For example, both martens and sable are resident. Moose and elk were formerly common, but have been affected by poaching in the surrounding area. In 1994 beavers were recorded as having moved back into the territory. Scientists on the reserve have recorded 37 species of mammals. The area is a site of international importance for birds; 140 species have been recorded, with 111 nesting. 10 species of bird in the Red Book of Russia are found, including the vulnerable Lesser white-fronted goose and the Falco vespertinus.

== Ecoeducation and access ==
As a strict nature reserve, the Denezhkin Kamen Reserve is mostly closed to the general public, although scientists and those with 'environmental education' purposes can make arrangements with park management for visits. There are two 'ecotourist' routes in the reserve, however, that are open to the public, but both require permits to be obtained in advance. One route is a rafting excursion on the Sosva River, the other is a 20 km hike to the top of the main ridge of the Urals. The reserve's management cautions that many published maps of the reserve's boundaries are inaccurate (official maps are posted on the website), and that tourists entering the site without proper escort will be fined. The main office is in the nearby town of Severouralsk.

== See also ==
- List of Russian Nature Reserves (class 1a 'zapovedniks')
