= Sukhoy Log, Sverdlovsk Oblast =

Town in Sverdlovsk Oblast, Russia

Sukhoy Log Сухой Лог
- Town
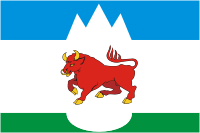
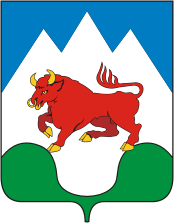
- Flag Coat of arms
- Interactive map of Sukhoy Log
- Location of Sukhoy Log Sukhoy Log (Sverdlovsk Oblast)
- Coordinates: 56°55′N 62°01′E
- Country: Russia
- Federal subject: Sverdlovsk Oblast
- Administrative district: Sukholozhsky District
- TownSelsoviet: Sukhoy Log
- Founded: 1710
- Town status since: 1943
- Elevation: 170 m (560 ft)

Population (2010 Census)
  - Total: 34,554
  - Estimate (2025): 32,293 (−6.5%)

Administrative status
  - Capital of: Sukholozhsky District, town of Sukhoy Log

Municipal status
  - Urban okrug: Sukhoy Log Urban Okrug
  - Capital of: Sukhoy Log Urban Okrug
- Time zone: UTC+5 (MSK+2)
- Postal codes: 624800, 624802–624804
- OKTMO ID: 65758000001
- Website: goslog.ru

Sukhoy Log population
- 2010 Census: 34,554
- 2002 Census: 36,407
- 1989 Census: 36,577
- 1979 Census: 31,954

Sukhoy Log (Russian: Сухо́й Лог, lit. dry gully) is a town and the administrative center of Sukholozhsky District in Sverdlovsk Oblast, Russia, located on the eastern slopes of the Ural Mountains on the Pyshma River (Ob's basin), 114 kilometers (71 mi) east of Yekaterinburg, the administrative center of the oblast. As of the 2010 Census, its population was 34,554.

== History ==
It was founded in 1710 as the sloboda of Sukholozhskaya. In 1847, coal deposits were prospected in the vicinity, and the village served as a coal mining center until the 1860s. Urban-type settlement status was granted to Sukhoy Log in 1932 and town status in 1943.

== Administrative and municipal status ==
Within the framework of administrative divisions, Sukhoy Log serves as the administrative center of Sukholozhsky District. As an administrative division, it is incorporated within Sukholozhsky District as the Town of Sukhoy Log. As a municipal division, the town of Sukhoy Log is, together with all twenty-five rural localities in Sukholozhsky District, incorporated as Sukhoy Log Urban Okrug.
