= Nizhnyaya Salda =

Town in Sverdlovsk Oblast, Russia

Nizhnyaya Salda Нижняя Салда
- Town
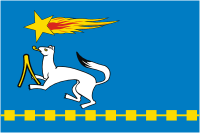
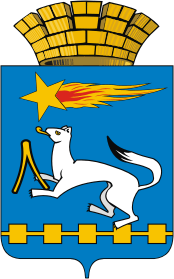
- Flag Coat of arms
- Interactive map of Nizhnyaya Salda
- Location of Nizhnyaya Salda Nizhnyaya Salda (Sverdlovsk Oblast)
- Coordinates: 58°04′N 60°43′E
- Country: Russia
- Federal subject: Sverdlovsk Oblast
- Founded: 1760
- Town status since: 1938
- Elevation: 200 m (660 ft)

Population (2010 Census)
  - Total: 17,619
  - Estimate (2025): 15,929 (−9.6%)

Administrative status
  - Subordinated to: Town of Nizhnyaya Salda
  - Capital of: Town of Nizhnyaya Salda

Municipal status
  - Urban okrug: Nizhnyaya Salda Urban Okrug
  - Capital of: Nizhnyaya Salda Urban Okrug
- Time zone: UTC+5 (MSK+2)
- Postal code: 624740–624742
- OKTMO ID: 65750000001
- Website: nsaldago.ru

Nizhnyaya Salda (Russian: Ни́жняя Салда́) is a town in Sverdlovsk Oblast, Russia, located on the Salda River (in the Ob's drainage basin), 205 kilometers (127 mi) north of Yekaterinburg, the administrative center of the oblast.

== History ==
It was founded in 1760; town status was granted to it in 1938.

== Administrative and municipal status ==
Within the framework of the administrative divisions, it is, together with five rural localities, incorporated as the Town of Nizhnyaya Salda—an administrative unit with the status equal to that of the districts. As a municipal division, the Town of Nizhnyaya Salda is incorporated as Nizhnyaya Salda Urban Okrug.
