= Tagil =

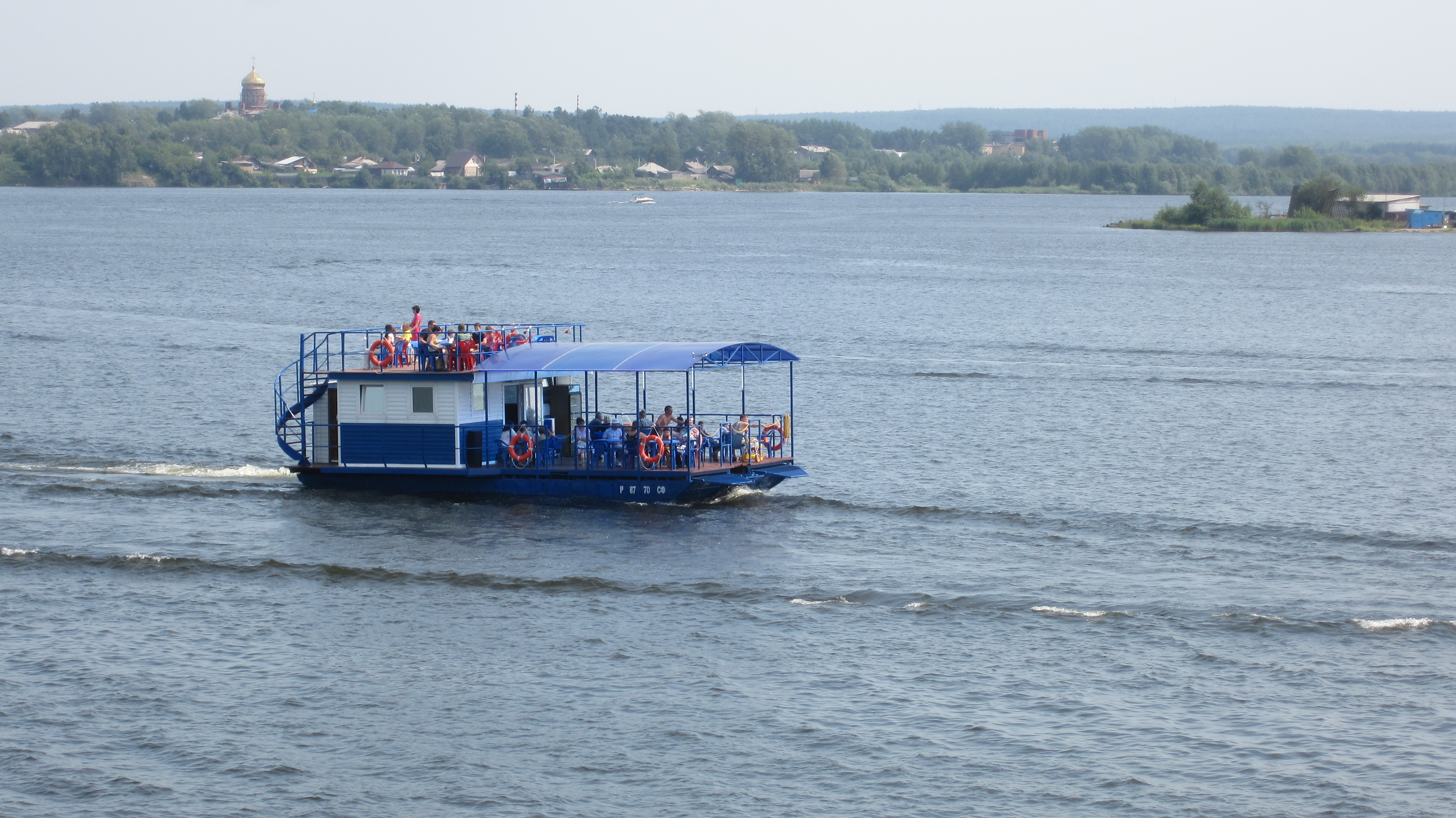

- Tura basin

Location
- Country: Russia

Physical characteristics
- Mouth: Tura
  - coordinates: 58.5297°N 62.4772°E
- Length: 414 km (257 mi)
- Basin size: 10,100 km^{2} (3,900 sq mi)

Basin features
- Progression: Tura→ Tobol→ Irtysh→ Ob→ Kara Sea

The Tagil (Russian: Тагил) is a river in Sverdlovsk Oblast, Russia. It is 414 kilometres (257 mi) long, with a drainage basin of 10,100 square kilometres (3,900 mi^{2}). The average discharge is 40 cubic metres per second (1,400 cu ft/s). The river has its sources on the eastern slopes of the Ural Mountains, east of Verkhny Tagil. From there, the Tagil flows north towards Nizhny Tagil, and then in a northeasterly direction to its confluence with the Tura.

The Salda is a southern tributary. A northern tributary, the Barancha, was probably used by Yermak Timofeyevich on his way to capture the Khanate of Sibir.
