= Pyshma (river) =

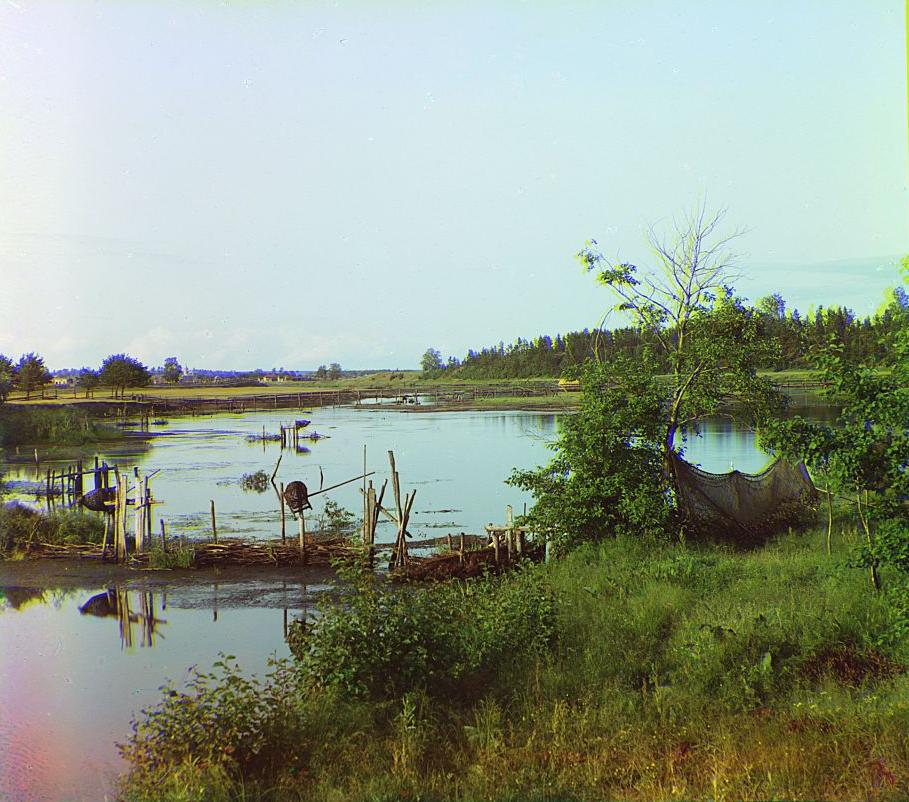
- 1912 photo by Prokudin-Gorskii

- Tura basin

Location
- Country: Russia

Physical characteristics
- Mouth: Tura
  - coordinates: 57°07′01″N 66°20′29″E
- Length: 603 km (375 mi)
- Basin size: 19,700 km^{2} (7,600 sq mi)

Basin features
- Progression: Tura→ Tobol→ Irtysh→ Ob→ Kara Sea

The Pyshma (Russian: Пышма, Siberian Tatar: Пышны, Pyshny) is a river in Sverdlovsk and Tyumen Oblasts of Russia. It is a right tributary of the Tura. It is 603 kilometres (375 mi) long, with a drainage basin of 19,700 square kilometres (7,600 sq mi).

The Pyshma has its sources at 290 metres (950 ft) above sea level on the eastern side of the Ural Mountains, near the town of Verkhnyaya Pyshma, just north of Yekaterinburg. The river flows onto the western part of the West Siberian Plain, and its confluence with the Tura River is at 46 metres (151 ft) above sea level, at the village of Sosonovo, some 40 kilometres (25 mi) east of Tyumen. In its lower course the river meanders heavily. Here it is around 50 metres (160 ft) wide and 3 metres (10 ft) deep.

The river's average discharge is 34 cubic metres per second (1,200 cu ft/s), with a maximum of 1,300 cubic metres per second (46,000 cu ft/s) and a minimum of 2 cubic metres per second (71 cu ft/s). Its main tributaries are, from the right: the Kunara and the Bolshaya Kalinovka, and from the left: the Reft.

The Pyshma freezes over in early November and stays frozen until the spring thaw starts in April.

There are 3 reservoirs on the river, including Beloyarsk reservoir, on the shore of which Beloyarsk Nuclear Power Station is located.

The towns along the Pyshma are Verkhnyaya Pyshma, Beryozovsky, Zarechny, Sukhoy Log, and Kamyshlov

The Pripyshminskiye Bory National Park is located in the river valley.

== Etymology ==
The name comes from tatar language and means "calm".
