= Tura (river) =

River in Sverdlovsk and Tyumen Oblasts, Russia

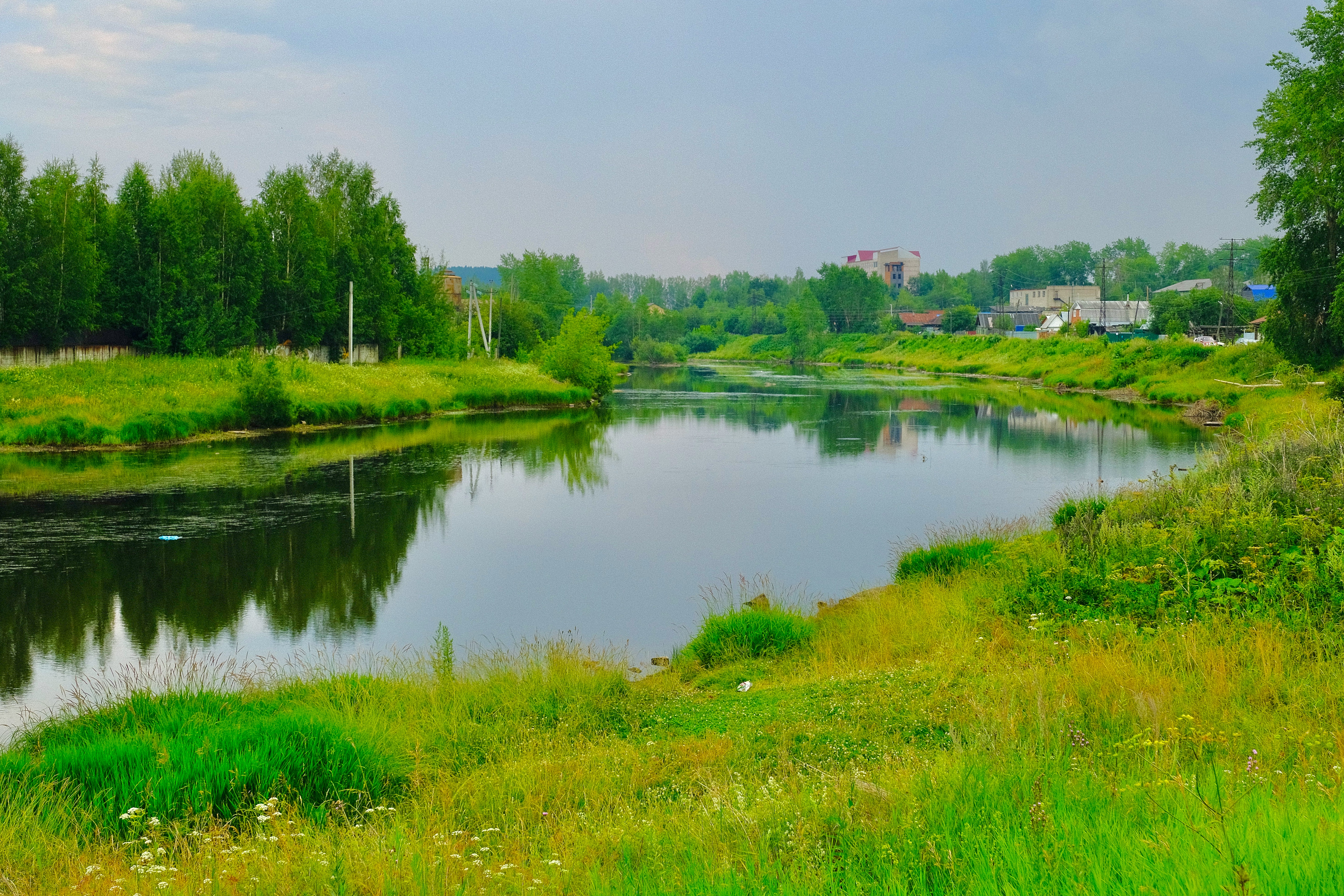
- The Tura River in Nizhnyaya Tura
- Native name: Тура (Russian)

Physical characteristics
- Source
  - location: Middle Urals
  - coordinates: 58°23′10″N 59°21′55″E
  - elevation: 370 m
- Mouth
  - location: Tobol
  - coordinates: 57°12′41″N 66°57′11″E
  - elevation: 42.2 m
- Length: 1,030 km (640 mi)
- Basin size: 80,400 km^{2} (31,000 sq mi)
- Discharge
  - average: 202.7 m^{3}/s (7,160 cu ft/s) (184 km from the mouth)

Basin features
- Progression: Tobol → Irtysh → Ob → Kara Sea
- State Water Register code: 14010501212111200004350
- Media related to Tura River at Wikimedia Commons

The Tura (near the source also — Dolgaya) is a river in the Sverdlovsk and Tyumen Oblasts of Russia, a left tributary of the Tobol (basin of the Irtysh). It flows across the Tura Plain.

== Etymology ==
In 18th-century sources, G. F. Müller explained the origin of the hydronym from the Tatar tura — "city", referring to its location on the river of Chimgi-Tura. Modern hypotheses link the hydronym to the Ural-Altaic root "tur" — "watercourse, body of water", which passed into several Ugric and Turkic languages.

== Physical and geographical characteristics ==
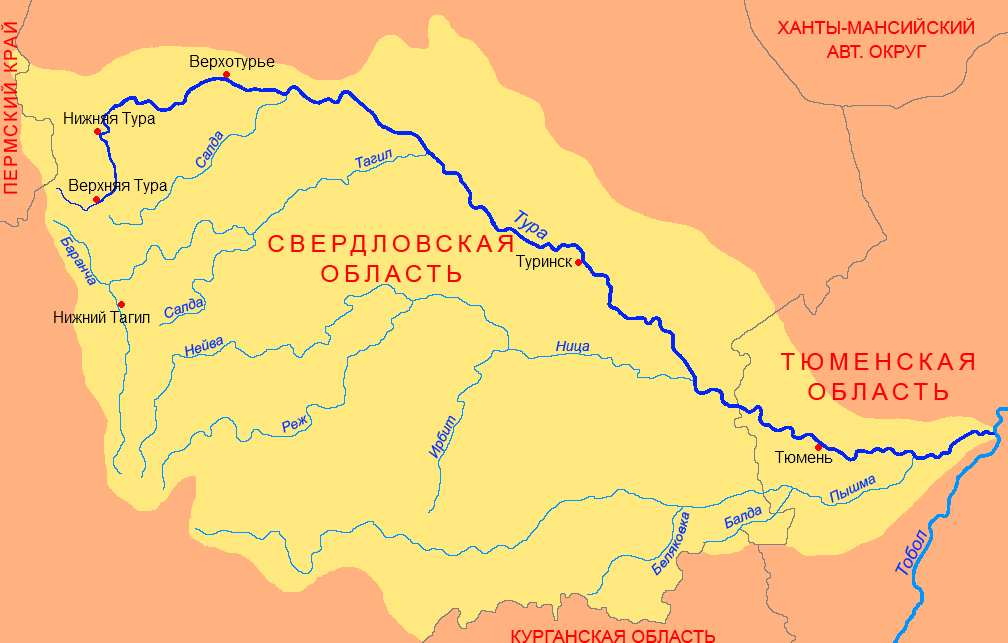
The Tura River basin

The length of the river is 1,030 kilometres (640 mi), and the drainage basin area is 80,400 square kilometres (31,000 sq mi). It is navigable for 635 km from its mouth. The elevation of the mouth is 42.2 m above sea level. The average annual discharge 184 km from the mouth is 202.7 cubic metres per second (7,160 cu ft/s).

It begins at an elevation of 370 m above sea level from the confluence of several streams 4 km southwest of the Khrebet-Uralsky railway station. Forest cover of the drainage basin is 51%; in its upper part, crystalline mountain rocks predominate, while in the lower reaches, sedimentary rocks are present.

In the upper reaches, the river valley is narrow with steep slopes, and the riverbed is rocky. In the lower reaches, the flow is smooth. The flow velocity is 2.0—2.5 m/s in the upper reaches and no more than 1.5 m/s in the lower reaches.

== Water regime ==
The Tura freezes in November and thaws mainly in the first half of April. In some years, ice break-up is accompanied by ice jams. The feeding is predominantly snow and rain. The flood period is prolonged (2.5 months) with a sharp rise in levels and a protracted decline. The range of water level fluctuations during the year is from 4 to 6.6 m.

As with many other rivers in the region, four phases are clearly distinguished in the river's water regime throughout the year:

- high spring freshet (flood);
- summer-autumn low water (with the lowest water level, as a rule, from August to October);
- insignificant floods in terms of height during autumn rains;
- stable low winter low water, lasting on average 140–160 days. The winter low water is established in the second half of November; the lowest water level is reached in January–March.

Average monthly discharge (m³/s) of the Tura River at Tyumen (184 km from the mouth) from 1896 to 1998

Jan	Feb	Mar	Apr	May	Jun	Jul	Aug	Sep	Oct	Nov	Dec	Year
32.91	29.79	30.16	291.36	803.59	504.07	204.94	153.66	128.89	120.83	83.82	48.37	202.7

== Tributaries ==
The main tributaries are the Salda, Tagil, Nitsa, Pyshma, Aktay, and Is.

The tributaries are listed in order from the mouth to the source:

- 8.2 km: Kretshanka
- 19.2 km: Bobrovka
- 27 km: Mezhnitsa
- 97 km: Pyshma
- 106 km: Ayga
- 143 km: Kaplanka
- 186 km: Tyumenka
- 187 km: Babarynka
- 239 km: Kanyrka
- 246 km: Akhmanka
- 266 km: Lipka
- 269 km: Tegen
- 295 km: Nitsa
- 305 km: Pogorelka
- 330 km: Shaytanka
- 358 km: Saragulka
- 418 km: Shaytanka
- 432 km: Pikhtovka
- 443 km: Yalynka
- 448 km: Taborinka
- 469 km: Kokuzovka
- 503 km: Bagyshevka
- 508 km: Susatka
- 524 km: Marinka
- 571 km: Turuzbayevka
- 592 km: Sukina

== Use ==
The famous Babinov Road (also known as the Sovereign's Road) was built along the river.

The river basin is well developed. Several cities are located on the river (from source to mouth): Verkhnyaya Tura, Nizhnyaya Tura, Lesnoy, Verkhoturye, Turinsk, and Tyumen. The Tura is the primary source of water for Tyumen's water supply.

In the upper part of the basin, there are deposits of copper, iron ores, gold, and platinum. The industries associated with these deposits are one of the primary sources of river pollution.

There are three reservoirs on the river with a total area of 23 square kilometres (8.9 sq mi), including the Verkhoturye Hydroelectric Station. Their construction led to a change in the river's water regime.
