= Administrative divisions of Sverdlovsk Oblast =

Administrative districts of Russian federal subject

Sverdlovsk Oblast Russia
- Administrative center: Yekaterinburg

Administrative structure (as of 2013)
- Districts: 30
- Cities/towns: 47
- Urban-type settlements: 27
- Selsovets: 431

Municipal structure (as of 2002)
- Rural settlements: 1,796 (inhabited); 128 (uninhabited)

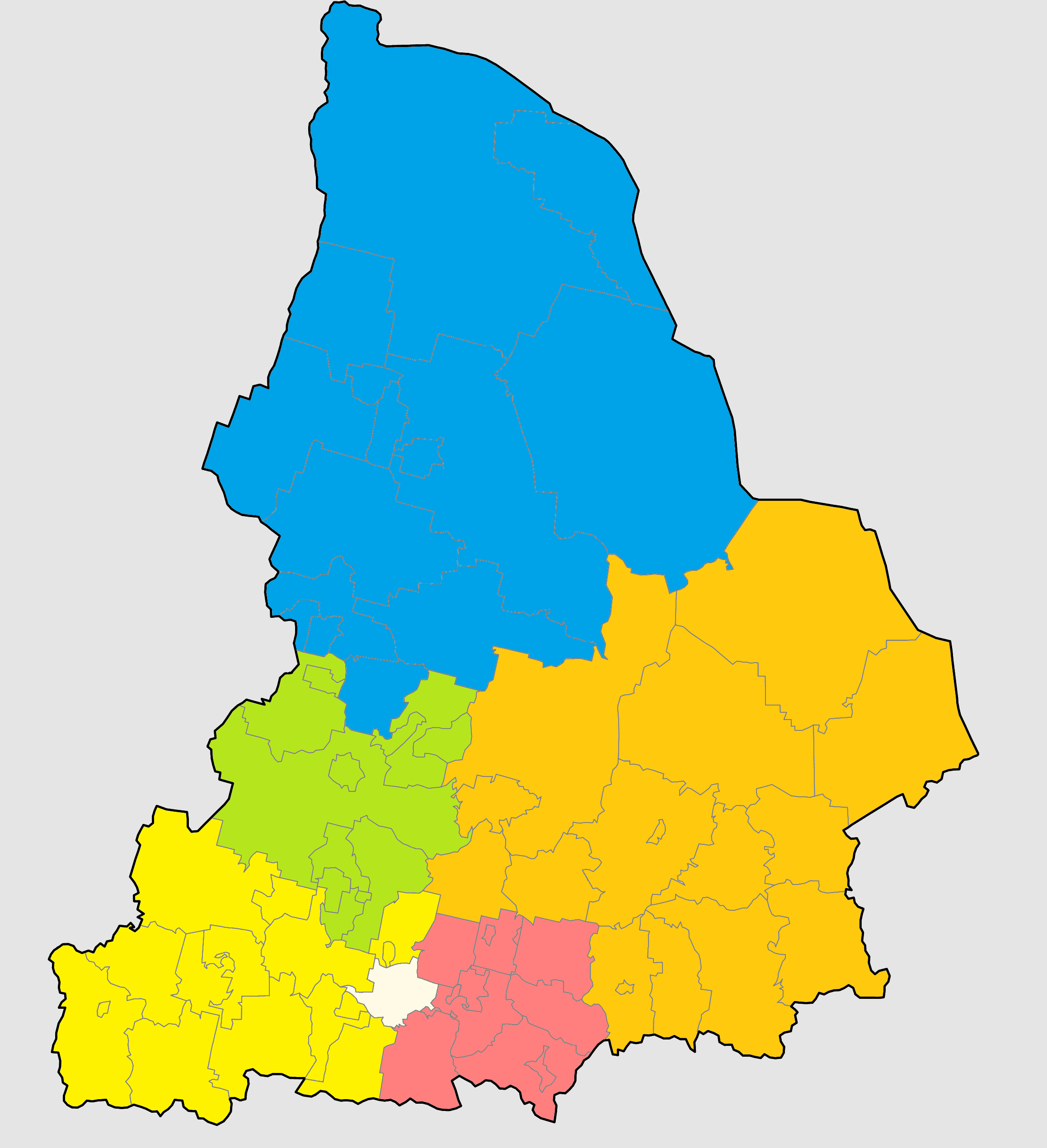
Map of the Administrative Divisions of Sverdlovsk Oblast (Divide 4 regions)

Sverdlovsk Oblast is a federal subject of Russia.

== Administrative and municipal divisions ==
Map

- urban okrug - also known as "municipal formation"

Division		Structure		OKATO	OKTMO	Urban-type settlement/ district-level town*	Rural (selsovet)
Division		Administrative	Municipal	OKATO	OKTMO	Urban-type settlement/ district-level town*	Rural (selsovet)
Novouralsk (Новоуральск)		city (ZATO)	urban okrug	65 540	65 752		1
Lesnoy (Лесной)		city (ZATO)	urban okrug	65 542	65 749	Yolkino (Ёлкино)	
Uralsky (Уральский)		urban-type settlement (ZATO)	municipal formation	65 570	65 767		
Svobodny (Свободный)		urban-type settlement (ZATO)	urban okrug	65 572	65 765		
Yekaterinburg (Екатеринбург)		city	municipal formation	65 401	65 701		
↳	Chkalovsky (Чкаловский)	(under Yekaterinburg)	—N/a	65 401	—N/a		2
↳	Kirovsky (Кировский)	(under Yekaterinburg)	—N/a	65 401	—N/a		
↳	Leninsky (Ленинский)	(under Yekaterinburg)	—N/a	65 401	—N/a		
↳	Oktyabrsky (Октябрьский)	(under Yekaterinburg)	—N/a	65 401	—N/a		
↳	Ordzhonikidzevsky (Орджоникидзевский)	(under Yekaterinburg)	—N/a	65 401	—N/a		1
↳	Verkh-Isetsky (Верх-Исетский)	(under Yekaterinburg)	—N/a	65 401	—N/a		1
↳	Zheleznodorozhny (Железнодорожный)	(under Yekaterinburg)	—N/a	65 401	—N/a		1
Alapayevsk (Алапаевск)		city	municipal formation	65 403	65 728		1
★	Asbest (Асбест)	city		65 409	—N/a		2
☆	Asbest (Асбест)	(under Asbest)	urban okrug	—N/a	65 729		
☆	Malysheva (Малышева)	(under Asbest)	urban okrug	—N/a	65 762		
☆	Reftinsky (Рефтинский)	(under Asbest)	urban okrug	—N/a	65 763		
Beryozovsky (Берёзовский)		city	urban okrug	65 412	65 731		
★	Verkhnyaya Pyshma (Верхняя Пышма)	city		65 420	—N/a		3
☆	Verkhnyaya Pyshma (Верхняя Пышма)	(under Verkhnyaya Pyshma)	urban okrug	—N/a	65 732		
☆	Sredneuralsk (Среднеуральск)	(under Verkhnyaya Pyshma)	urban okrug	—N/a	65 757		
Zarechny (Заречный)		city	urban okrug	65 426	65 737		1
★	Ivdel (Ивдель)	city		65 428	—N/a		5
☆	Ivdel (Ивдель)	(under Ivdel)	urban okrug	—N/a	65 738		
☆	Pelym (Пелым)	(under Ivdel)	urban okrug	—N/a	65 764		
Irbit (Ирбит)		city	municipal formation	65 432	65 739		
Kamensk-Uralsky (Каменск-Уральский)		city	urban okrug	65 436	65 740		
↳	Krasnogorsky (Красногорский)	(under Kamensk-Uralsky)	—N/a	65 436	—N/a		1
↳	Sinarsky (Синарский)	(under Kamensk-Uralsky)	—N/a	65 436	—N/a		1
Kamyshlov (Камышлов)		city	urban okrug	65 440	65 741		
★	Karpinsk (Карпинск)	city		65 445	—N/a		2
☆	Karpinsk (Карпинск)	(under Karpinsk)	urban okrug	—N/a	65 742		
☆	Volchansk (Волчанск)	(under Karpinsk)	urban okrug	—N/a	65 735		
Kachkanar (Качканар)		city	urban okrug	65 448	65 743		
★	Kirovgrad (Кировград)	city		65 453	—N/a		1
☆	Kirovgrad (Кировград)	(under Kirovgrad)	urban okrug	—N/a	65 744		
☆	Verkhny Tagil (Верхний Тагил)	(under Kirovgrad)	urban okrug	—N/a	65 733		
Krasnoturyinsk (Краснотурьинск)		city	urban okrug	65 456	65 745		1
Krasnouralsk (Красноуральск)		city	urban okrug	65 460	65 746		2
Krasnoufimsk (Красноуфимск)		city	urban okrug	65 468	65 747		1
★	Kushva (Кушва)	city		65 470	—N/a		3
☆	Kushva (Кушва)	(under Kushva)	urban okrug	—N/a	65 748		
☆	Verkhnyaya Tura (Верхняя Тура)	(under Kushva)	urban okrug	—N/a	65 734		
Nizhny Tagil (Нижний Тагил)		city	urban okrug	65 476	65 751		
↳	Dzerzhinsky (Дзержинский)	(under Nizhny Tagil)	—N/a	65 476	—N/a		
↳	Leninsky (Ленинский)	(under Nizhny Tagil)	—N/a	65 476	—N/a		
↳	Tagilstroyevsky (Тагилстроевский)	(under Nizhny Tagil)	—N/a	65 476	—N/a		
Nizhnyaya Salda (Нижняя Салда)		city	urban okrug	65 477	65 750		2
Nizhnyaya Tura (Нижняя Тура)		city	urban okrug	65 478	65 715		3
Pervouralsk (Первоуральск)		city	urban okrug	65 480	65 753		3
Polevskoy (Полевской)		city	urban okrug	65 482	65 754		5
★	Revda (Ревда)	city		65 484	—N/a		2
☆	Revda (Ревда)	(under Revda)	urban okrug	—N/a	65 719		
☆	Degtyarsk (Дегтярск)	(under Revda)	urban okrug	—N/a	65 736		
Severouralsk (Североуральск)		city	urban okrug	65 490	65 755		1
Serov (Серов)		city	urban okrug	65 492	65 756		1
Alapayevsky (Алапаевский)		district	municipal formation	65 201	65 771	Verkhnyaya Sinyachikha (Верхняя Синячиха)	31
Makhnyovo (Махнёво)		(under Alapayevsky)	municipal formation	65 201	65 769		
Artyomovsky (Артёмовский)		district	urban okrug	65 202	65 7	Artyomovsky	8
Artinsky (Артинский)		district	urban okrug	65 203	65 704	Arti (Арти)	17
Achitsky (Ачитский)		district	urban okrug	65 204	65 705	Achit (Ачит)	11
Baykalovsky (Байкаловский)		district		65 208	65 608		14
Beloyarsky (Белоярский)		district	urban okrug	65 209	65 706	Beloyarsky (Белоярский)	11
Verkhneye Dubrovo (Верхнее Дуброво)		(under Beloyarsky)	urban okrug	65 209	65 760		
Bogdanovichsky (Богдановичский)		district	urban okrug	65 210	65 707	Bogdanovich (Богданович) town*	13
Verkhnesaldinsky (Верхнесалдинский)		district	urban okrug	65 211	65 708	Verkhnyaya Salda (Верхняя Салда) town*	4
Verkhotursky (Верхотурский)		district	urban okrug	65 212	65 709	Verkhoturye (Верхотурье) town*	10
Garinsky (Гаринский)		district	urban okrug	65 215	65 710	Gari (Гари)	10
Irbitsky (Ирбитский)		district	municipal formation	65 218	65 711	Pionersky (Пионерский)	21
Kamensky (Каменский)		district	urban okrug	65 222	65 712	Martyush (Мартюш)	16
Kamyshlovsky (Камышловский)		district		65 223	65 623		15
Krasnoufimsky (Красноуфимский)		district	urban okrug	65 224	65 713	Natalyinsk (Натальинск)	24
Nevyansky (Невьянский)		district	urban okrug	65 227	65 714	Nevyansk (Невьянск) town*	9
Verkh-Neyvinsky (Верх-Нейвинский)		(under Nevyansky)	urban okrug	65 227	65 761		
Nizhneserginsky (Нижнесергинский)		district		65 228	65 628	Mikhaylovsk (Михайловск) town*; Nizhniye Sergi (Нижние Серьги) town*; Atig (Атиг); Druzhinino (Дружинино); Verkhniye Sergi (Верхние Серьги)	13
Bisert (Бисерть)		(under Nizhneserginsky)	urban okrug	65 228	65 759		
Novolyalinsky (Новолялинский)		district	urban okrug	65 229	65 716	Novaya Lyalya (Новая Ляля) town*	6
Prigorodny (Пригородный)		district	urban okrug	65 232	65 717	Gornouralsky (Горноуральский)	21
Pyshminsky (Пышминский)		district	urban okrug	65 233	65 718	Pyshma (Пышма)	13
Rezhevsky (Режевский)		district	urban okrug	65 236	65 720	Rezh (Реж) town*	9
Serovsky (Серовский)		district	urban okrug	65 238	65 721	Sosva (Сосьва)	10
Slobodo-Turinsky (Слободо-Туринский)		district		65 239	65 639		13
Sukholozhsky (Сухоложский)		district	urban okrug	65 240	65 758	Sukhoy Log (Сухой Лог) town*	8
Sysertsky (Сысертский)		district	urban okrug	65 241	65 722	Sysert (Сысерть) town*	7
Aramil (Арамиль)		(under Sysertsky)	urban okrug	65 241	65 729		
Taborinsky (Таборинский)		district		65 245	65 645		8
Tavdinsky (Тавдинский)		district	urban okrug	65 248	65 723	Tavda (Тавда) town*	10
Talitsky (Талицкий)		district	urban okrug	65 249	65 724	Talitsa (Талица) town*	18
Tugulymsky (Тугулымский)		district	urban okrug	65 250	65 725	Tugulym (Тугулым)	10
Turinsky (Туринский)		district	urban okrug	65 254	65 726	Turinsk (Туринск) town*	15
Shalinsky (Шалинский)		district	urban okrug	65 257	65 727	Shalya (Шаля)	9
Staroutkinsk (Староуткинск)		(under Shalinsky)	urban okrug	65 257	65 766		
