= Druzhinino =

Druzhinino may refer to:

- Druzhinino (urban locality), an urban-type settlement in Russia
- Druzhinino, Vologda Oblast, a village in Russia
