= Nizhneserginsky =

Nizhneserginsky (masculine), Nizhneserginskaya (feminine), or Nizhneserginskoye (neuter) may refer to:

- Nizhneserginsky District, a district of Sverdlovsk Oblast, Russia
- Nizheserginskoye Urban Settlement, a municipal formation which the Town of Nizhniye Sergi in Nizhneserginsky District of Sverdlovsk Oblast, Russia is incorporated as
