= Verkhniye Sergi =

Urban-type settlement in Sverdlovsk Oblast, Russia

Verkhniye Sergi Верхние Серги
- Urban-type settlement
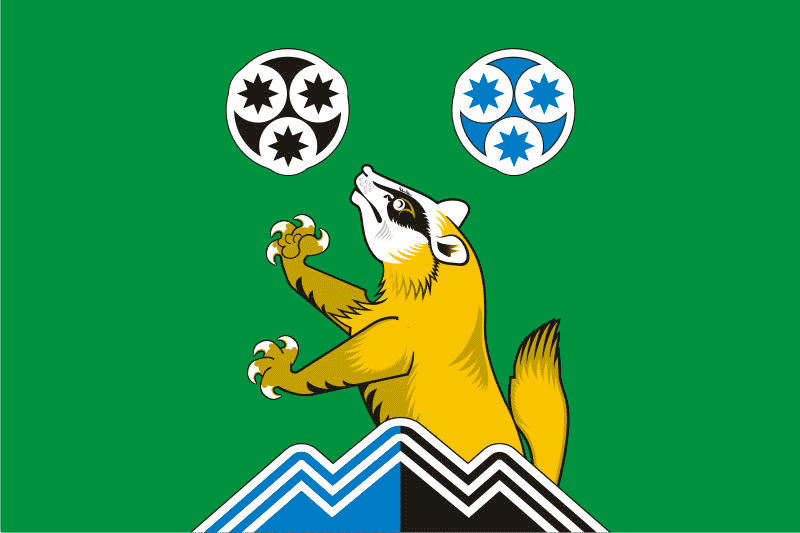
- Flag
- Interactive map of Verkhniye Sergi
- Location of Verkhniye Sergi Verkhniye Sergi (Sverdlovsk Oblast)
- Coordinates: 56°39′N 59°33′E
- Country: Russia
- Federal subject: Sverdlovsk Oblast
- Administrative district: Nizhneserginsky District
- Founded: 1742

Population (2010 Census)
  - Total: 6,105
  - Estimate (2025): 5,364 (−12.1%)
- Time zone: UTC+5 (MSK+2)
- Postal codes: 623070, 623090
- OKTMO ID: 65628163051

Verkhniye Sergi (Russian: Ве́рхние Се́рги) is an urban locality (a work settlement) in Nizhneserginsky District of Sverdlovsk Oblast, Russia, located in the Ural Mountains on the Serga River 100 kilometers (62 mi) west-southwest of Yekaterinburg and 20 kilometers (12 mi) east of Nizhniye Sergi. Population: 6,105 (2010 census); 6,629 (2002 census); 7,515 (1989 Soviet census).
