= Achit =

Achit may refer to:

- Acharya Institute of Technology (ACHIT), a private co-educational engineering and management college in Bangalore, India
- Achit Lake, a lake in Mongolia
- Achit (urban-type settlement), an urban locality (a work settlement) in Sverdlovsk Oblast, Russia
- Achit (metaphysics), a term used in Vishishtadvaita to refer to the world of insentient entities as denoted by matter
