= Garinsky =

Garinsky (masculine), Garinskaya (feminine), or Garinskoye (neuter) may refer to:

- Garinsky District, a district of Sverdlovsk Oblast, Russia
  - Garinsky Urban Okrug, the municipal formation which this district is incorporated as
- Garinskaya, a rural locality (a village) in Ivanovo Oblast, Russia
