= Pyshminsky =

Pyshminsky (masculine), Pyshminskaya (feminine), or Pyshminskoye (neuter) may refer to:

- Pyshminsky District, a district of Sverdlovsk Oblast, Russia
  - Pyshminsky Urban Okrug, the municipal formation which this district is incorporated as
- Pyshminskaya, a rural locality (a settlement) in Sverdlovsk Oblast, Russia
