= Artinsky District =

District in Sverdlovsk Oblast, Russia

Artinsky District Артинский район (Russian)
- District
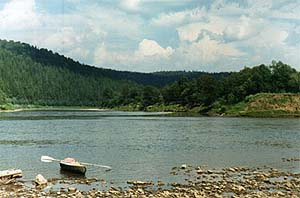
- The Ufa River near the work settlement of Arti in Artinsky District

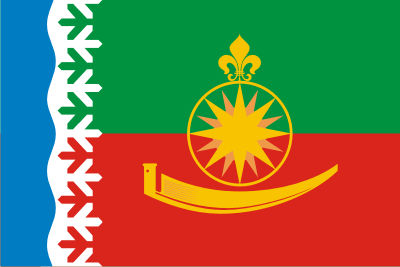
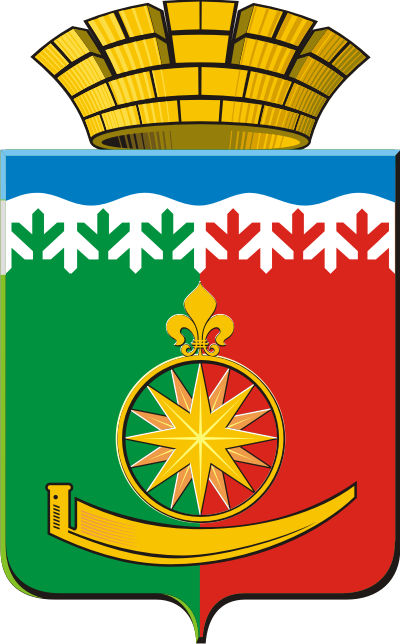
- Flag Coat of arms
- Location of Artinsky District in Sverdlovsk Oblast
- Coordinates: 56.335°N 58.468°E
- Country: Russia
- Federal subject: Sverdlovsk Oblast
- Established: December 1923
- Administrative center: Arti

Area
  - Total: 2,780.1 km^{2} (1,073.4 sq mi)

Population (2010 Census)
  - Total: 29,624
  - Density: 10.656/km^{2} (27.598/sq mi)
  - Urban: 43.5%
  - Rural: 56.5%

Administrative structure
  - Administrative divisions: 1 Work settlements, 17 Selsoviets
  - Inhabited localities: 1 urban-type settlements, 58 rural localities

Municipal structure
  - Municipally incorporated as: Artinsky Urban Okrug
- Time zone: UTC+5 (MSK+2)
- OKTMO ID: 65704000
- Website: http://arti-go.ru

Population of Artinsky District
- 2010 Census: 29,624
- 2002 Census: 33,648
- 1989 Census: 39,279
- 1979 Census: 39,440

Artinsky District (Russian: А́ртинский райо́н) is an administrative district (raion), one of the thirty in Sverdlovsk Oblast, Russia. As a municipal division, it is incorporated as Artinsky Urban Okrug. It is located in the southwest of the oblast. Its administrative center is the urban locality (a work settlement) of Arti. As of the 2010 Census, the total population of the district was 29,624, with the population of Arti accounting for 43.5% of that number.

The Artinskian Age of the Permian Period of geological time was named for the Artinsk area.
