= Arti, Russia =

Urban-type settlement in Sverdlovsk Oblast, Russia

Arti Арти
- Urban-type settlement
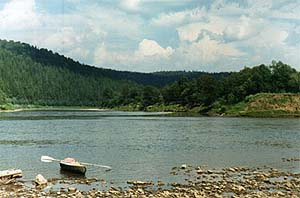
- Landscape around Arti

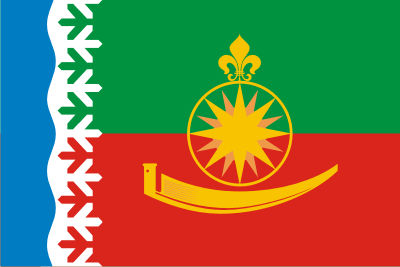
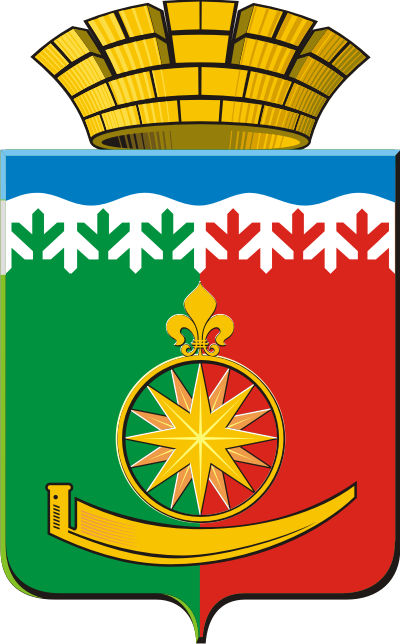
- Flag Coat of arms
- Interactive map of Arti
- Location of Arti Arti (Sverdlovsk Oblast)
- Coordinates: 56°25′N 58°32′E
- Country: Russia
- Federal subject: Sverdlovsk Oblast
- Administrative district: Artinsky District
- Founded: 1783
- Elevation: 230 m (750 ft)

Population (2010 Census)
  - Total: 12,881
  - Estimate (2025): 11,513 (−10.6%)
- Time zone: UTC+5 (MSK+2)
- Postal code: 623340
- OKTMO ID: 65704000051

Arti (Russian: Арти) is an urban locality (an urban-type settlement) and the administrative center of Artinsky District of Sverdlovsk Oblast, Russia, located on the Artya River at its confluence with the Ufa River, 203 kilometers (126 mi) southwest of Yekaterinburg and 62 kilometers (39 mi) southeast of Krasnoufimsk. Population: 12,881 (2010 census); 13,790 (2002 census); 15,803 (1989 Soviet census); 13,800 (1968).

== History ==
It was founded in 1783 when merchant Lugin built a mechanical plant in the area. During the 19th century the majority of the population was employed by this plant. The plant's products were held in high regard not only in Russia—scythes produced in Arti, for example, received an award at the Paris technical exhibition. In 1917, the plant became one of the first to be nationalized.

Arti is also known for the first Ural Geophysical Station, which was established there in 1870.

In 1874 the Artinskian Age of the Permian Period of geological time was named for the Artinsk area by Alexander Karpinsky.

In 1918, Arti was a place of an anti-Soviet rebellion, during which many people were killed. After the end of the Russian Civil War, Arti remained the only producer of scythes in the whole country. During the World War II, the plant started to manufacture sewing machines and needles.

== Economy ==
Nowadays Arti is a rapidly developing settlement, where the majority of its economic growth is in the sphere of services.

Unemployment rate is rather low (3.02%). Twenty percent of the unemployed are people with higher education as there is practically no vacant positions for them in Arti at the moment.
