= Medny =

Medny (Russian: Медный; masculine), Mednaya (Медная; feminine), or Mednoye (Медное; neuter) is the name of several rural localities in Russia:

- Medny (rural locality), a settlement under the administrative jurisdiction of Verkh-Isetsky City District of the City of Yekaterinburg in Sverdlovsk Oblast
- Mednoye, Tambov Oblast, a selo in Satinsky Selsoviet of Sampursky District in Tambov Oblast
- Mednoye, Tver Oblast, a selo in Mednovskoye Rural Settlement of Kalininsky District in Tver Oblast
