= Martyush =

Urban-type settlement in Sverdlovsk Oblast, Russia

Martyush Мартюш
- Urban-type settlement
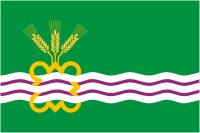
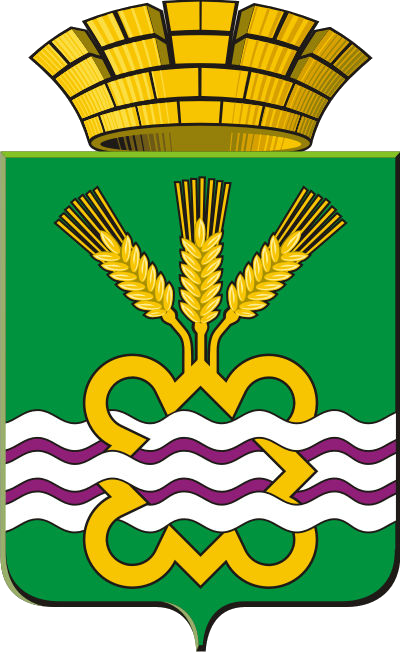
- Flag Coat of arms
- Location of Martyush
- Location of Martyush Martyush (Sverdlovsk Oblast)
- Coordinates: 56.3993°N 61.8858°E
- Country: Russia
- Federal subject: Sverdlovsk Oblast
- Administrative district: Kamensky District
- Founded: 1931

Population (2010 Census)
  - Total: 3,994
- Time zone: UTC+5 (MSK+2)
- Postal code(s): 623462
- OKTMO ID: 65712000051

Martyush (Russian: Мартюш) is an urban locality (an urban-type settlement) in Kamensky District of Sverdlovsk Oblast, Russia. Population: 3,994 (2010 Census); 4,179 (2002 Census);
