= Novolyalinsky District =

District in Sverdlovsk Oblast, Russia

Novolyalinsky District Новолялинский район (Russian)
- District
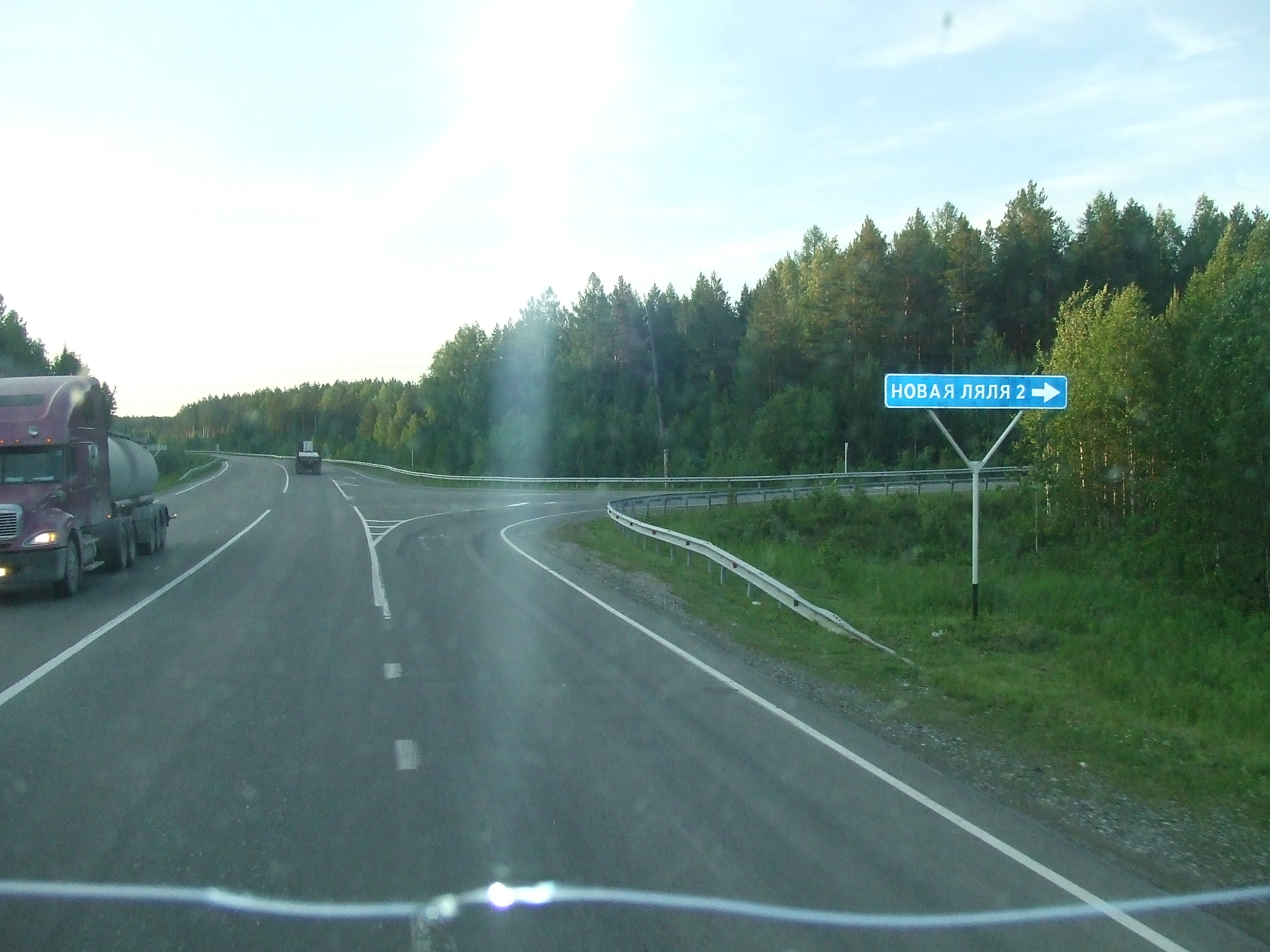
- Road to Novaya Lyalya

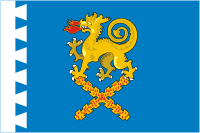
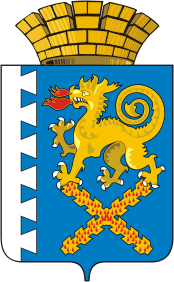
- Flag Coat of arms
- Location of Novolyalinsky District in Sverdlovsk Oblast
- Coordinates: 59.225°N 58.934°E
- Country: Russia
- Federal subject: Sverdlovsk Oblast
- Administrative center: Novaya Lyalya

Area
  - Total: 6,206 km^{2} (2,396 sq mi)

Population (2010 Census)
  - Total: 23,564
  - Density: 3.797/km^{2} (9.834/sq mi)
  - Urban: 54.0%
  - Rural: 46.0%

Administrative structure
  - Inhabited localities: 1 cities/towns, 23 rural localities

Municipal structure
  - Municipally incorporated as: Novolyalinsky Urban Okrug
- Time zone: UTC+5 (MSK+2)
- OKTMO ID: 65716000
- Website: http://nlyalyago.ru/

Novolyalinsky District (Russian: Новолялинский райо́н) is an administrative district (raion) in one of the thirty districts in Sverdlovsk Oblast, Russia. As a municipal division, it is incorporated as Novolyalinsky Urban Okrug. The area of the district is 6,206 square kilometers (2,396 sq mi). Its administrative center is the town of Novaya Lyalya. Population: 23,564 (2010 Census); 26,512 (2002 census); 29,819 (1989 Soviet census). The population of Novaya Lyalya accounts for 54.0% of the district's total population.
