= Natalyinsk =

Urban-type settlement in Sverdlovsk Oblast, Russia

Natalyinsk Натальинск
- Urban-type settlement
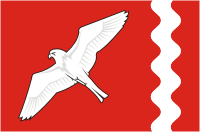
- Flag
- Interactive map of Natalyinsk
- Location of Natalyinsk Natalyinsk (Sverdlovsk Oblast)
- Coordinates: 56.4755°N 57.8740°E
- Country: Russia
- Federal subject: Sverdlovsk Oblast
- Administrative district: Krasnoufimsky District

Population (2010 Census)
  - Total: 1,914
  - Estimate (2025): 1,471 (−23.1%)
- Time zone: UTC+5 (MSK+2)
- Postal code: 623320
- OKTMO ID: 65713000051

Natalyinsk (Russian: Натальинск) is an urban locality (an urban-type settlement) in Krasnoufimsky District of Sverdlovsk Oblast, Russia. Population: 1,914 (2010 census); 2,094 (2002 census); 2,377 (1989 Soviet census).
