= Pionersky, Sverdlovsk Oblast =

Urban-type settlement in Ekaterinburg Oblast, Russia

Pionersky Пионерский
- Urban-type settlement
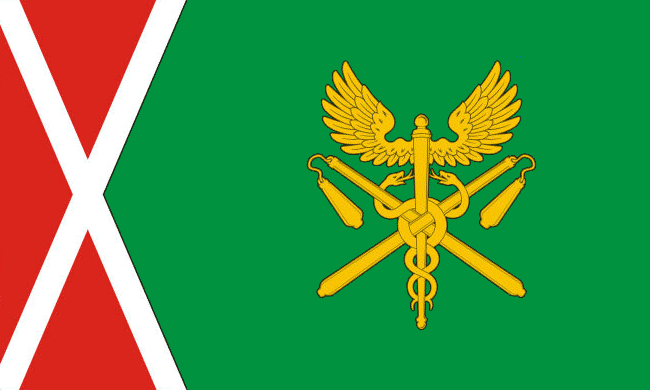
- Flag
- Interactive map of Pionersky
- Location of Pionersky Pionersky (Russia)
- Coordinates: 57.6829°N 63.0155°E
- Country: Russia
- Federal subject: Sverdlovsk Oblast
- Administrative district: Irbitsky District
- Founded: 1963

Population (2010 Census)
  - Total: 3,104
  - Estimate (2025): 3,041 (−2%)
- Time zone: UTC+5 (MSK+2)
- Postal code: 623855
- OKTMO ID: 65711000051

Pionersky (Russian: Пионерский) is an urban locality (an urban-type settlement) in Irbitsky District of Sverdlovsk Oblast, Russia. Population: 3,104 (2010 census); 3,186 (2002 census);
