= Druzhinino, Sverdlovsk Oblast =

Urban-type settlement in Sverdlovsk Oblast, Russia

Druzhinino Дружинино
- Urban-type settlement
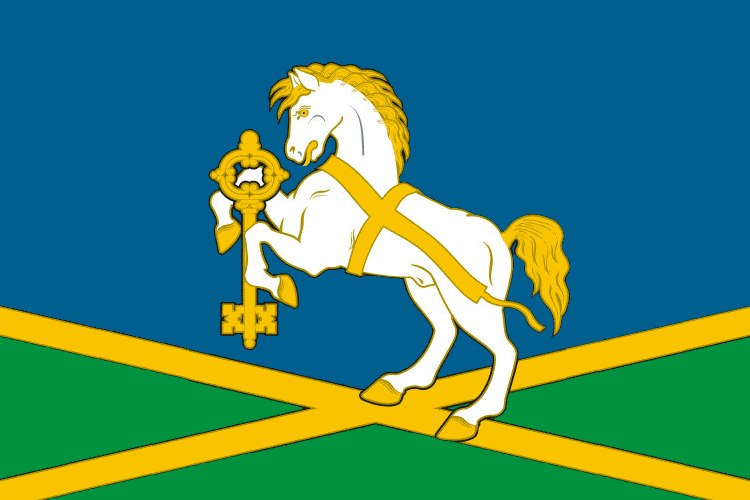
- Flag
- Interactive map of Druzhinino
- Location of Druzhinino Druzhinino (Sverdlovsk Oblast)
- Coordinates: 56.7905°N 59.5191°E
- Country: Russia
- Federal subject: Sverdlovsk Oblast
- Administrative district: Nizhneserginsky District

Population (2010 Census)
  - Total: 3,793
  - Estimate (2025): 3,049 (−19.6%)
- Time zone: UTC+5 (MSK+2)
- Postal code: 623060
- OKTMO ID: 65628174051

Druzhinino (Russian: Дружинино) is an urban locality (an urban-type settlement) in Nizhneserginsky District of Sverdlovsk Oblast, Russia.

== Population ==
In 1989, the population of Druzhinino was 3,954. In 2002, the population was 2,945. In 2010, the population was 3,793.

== See also ==
- Druzhinino, Vologda Oblast
