= Achitsky District =

District in Sverdlovsk Oblast, Russia

Achitsky District Ачитский район
- District
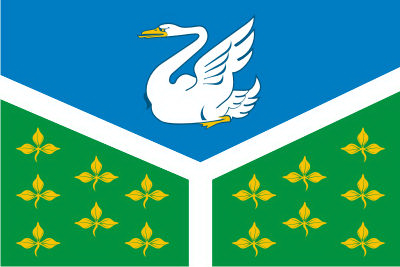
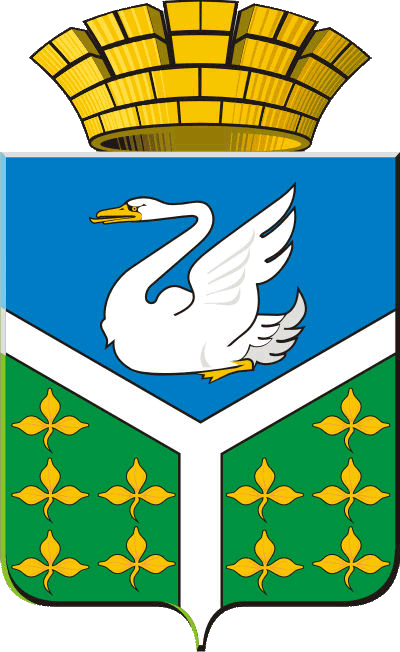
- Flag Coat of arms
- Location of Achitsky District in Sverdlovsk Oblast
- Coordinates: 56°48′N 57°53′E
- Country: Russia
- Federal subject: Sverdlovsk Oblast
- Administrative center: Achit

Area
  - Total: 2,071.6 km^{2} (799.8 sq mi)

Population (2010 Census)
  - Total: 16,807
  - Density: 8.1131/km^{2} (21.013/sq mi)
  - Urban: 29.4%
  - Rural: 70.6%

Administrative structure
  - Administrative divisions: 1 Work settlements, 11 Selsoviets
  - Inhabited localities: 1 urban-type settlements, 52 rural localities

Municipal structure
  - Municipally incorporated as: Achitsky Urban Okrug
- Time zone: UTC+5 (MSK+2)
- OKTMO ID: 65705000
- Website: http://achit-adm.ru/

Achitsky District (Russian: Ачитский райо́н) is an administrative district (raion), one of the thirty in Sverdlovsk Oblast, Russia. As a municipal division, it is incorporated as Achitsky Urban Okrug. The area of the district is 2,071.6 square kilometers (799.8 sq mi). Its administrative center is the urban locality (a work settlement) of Achit. Population: 16,807 (2010 Census); 19,132 (2002 Census); 23,348 (1989 Soviet census). The population of Achit accounts for 29.4% of the district's total population.
