= Chkalovsky City District, Yekaterinburg =

Chkalovsky Чкаловский
- Interactive map of Chkalovsky
- Location of Chkalovsky Chkalovsky (Sverdlovsk Oblast)
- Coordinates: 56°46′00″N 60°38′00″E
- Country: Russia
- Federal subject: Sverdlovsk Oblast
- Founded: 1943

Government
  - Leader: Shipitsyn Evgeny Viktorovich

Area
  - Total: 402 km^{2} (155 sq mi)

Population (2010 Census)
  - Total: 275,571
  - Estimate (2021): 286,277 (+3.9%)
  - Density: 685/km^{2} (1,780/sq mi)

Administrative status
  - Subordinated to: Yekaterinburg
- Dialing code: +7 3432

Chkalovsky (Чкаловский) City District is a city district in Yekaterinburg in Sveldlovsk Oblast, Russia. It contains two selsovets.

number 8 is Chkalovsky

== See also ==
- Administrative divisions of Sverdlovsk Oblast
