= Mikhaylovsk, Sverdlovsk Oblast =

Town in Sverdlovsk Oblast, Russia

Mikhaylovsk Михайловск
- Town
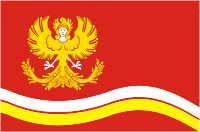
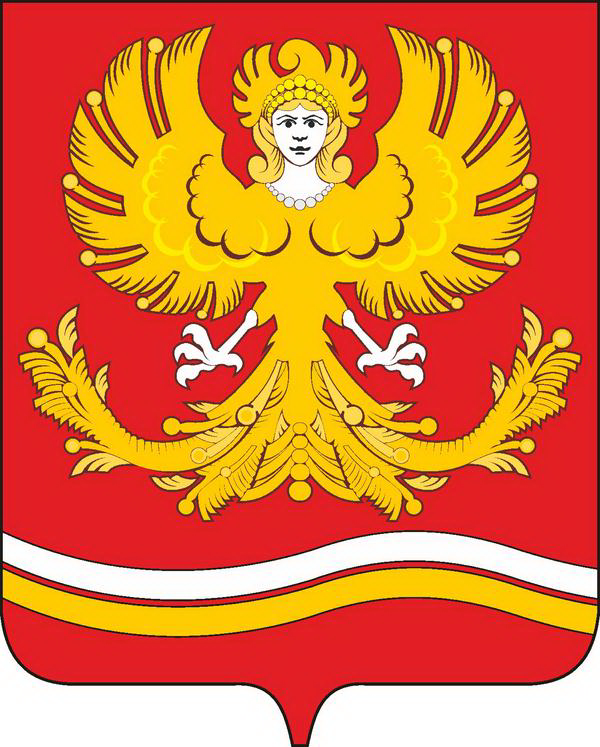
- Flag Coat of arms
- Interactive map of Mikhaylovsk
- Location of Mikhaylovsk Mikhaylovsk (Sverdlovsk Oblast)
- Coordinates: 56°27′N 59°08′E
- Country: Russia
- Federal subject: Sverdlovsk Oblast
- Administrative district: Nizhneserginsky District
- TownSelsoviet: Mikhaylovsk
- Founded: 1805; 221 years ago
- Town status since: 1961; 65 years ago
- Elevation: 250 m (820 ft)

Population (2010 Census)
  - Total: 9,852
  - Estimate (2025): 9,626 (−2.3%)

Administrative status
  - Capital of: town of Mikhaylovsk

Municipal status
  - Municipal district: Nizhneserginsky Municipal District
  - Urban settlement: Mikhaylovskoye Urban Settlement
  - Capital of: Mikhaylovskoye Urban Settlement
- Time zone: UTC+5 (MSK+2)
- Postal codes: 623080, 623082
- OKTMO ID: 65628104001
- Website: михайловскоемо.рф

Mikhaylovsk (Russian: Миха́йловск) is a town in Nizhneserginsky District of Sverdlovsk Oblast, Russia, located on the shores of Mikhaylovsky Pond, 163 kilometers (101 mi) southwest of Yekaterinburg, the administrative center of the oblast. Population: 9,852 (2010 census); 10,538 (2002 census); 12,943 (1989 Soviet census).

== History ==
It was founded in 1805 as Mikhaylovsky Zavod (Russian: Миха́йловский Заво́д). It was granted town status and given its present name in 1961.

== Administrative and municipal status ==
Within the framework of the administrative divisions, it is, together with one rural locality (the settlement of Mikhaylovsky Zavod), incorporated within Nizhneserginsky District as the Town of Mikhaylovsk. As a municipal division, the Town of Mikhaylovsk, together with ten rural localities in Nizhneserginsky District, is incorporated within Nizhneserginsky Municipal District as Mikhaylovskoye Urban Settlement.
