= Atig =

Work settlement in Sverdlovsk Oblast, Russia

Atig Атиг
- Work settlement
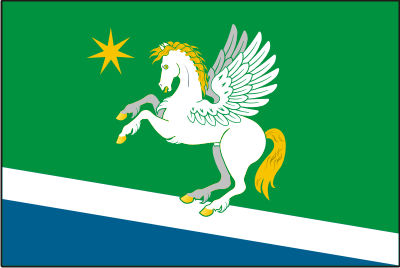
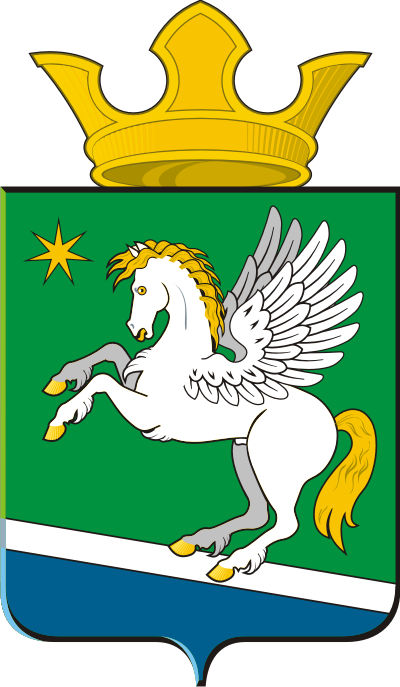
- Flag Coat of arms
- Interactive map of Atig
- Location of Atig Atig (Sverdlovsk Oblast)
- Coordinates: 56°41′12″N 59°26′13″E
- Country: Russia
- Federal subject: Sverdlovsk Oblast
- Administrative district: Nizhneserginsky District
- Founded: 1790
- Elevation: 338 m (1,109 ft)

Population (2010 Census)
  - Total: 3,405
  - Estimate (2025): 2,958 (−13.1%)

Municipal status
  - Municipal district: Nizhneserginsky Municipal District
  - Urban settlement: Work Settlement Atig Urban Settlement
  - Capital of: Work Settlement Atig Urban Settlement
- Time zone: UTC+5 (MSK+2)
- Postal code: 623075
- OKTMO ID: 65628154051

Atig (Russian: Атиг) is an urban locality (urban-type settlement) in Nizhneserginsky District of Sverdlovsk Oblast, Russia. Population: 3,405 (2010 census); 3,906 (2002 census); 4,499 (1989 Soviet census).
