= Novaya Lyalya =

Town in Sverdlovsk Oblast, Russia

Novaya Lyalya Новая Ляля
- Town
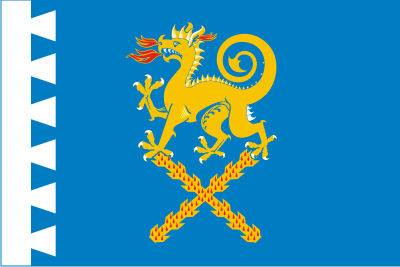
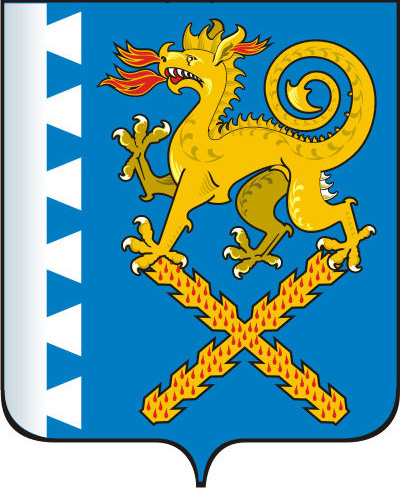
- Flag Coat of arms
- Interactive map of Novaya Lyalya
- Location of Novaya Lyalya Novaya Lyalya (Sverdlovsk Oblast)
- Coordinates: 59°04′N 60°36′E
- Country: Russia
- Federal subject: Sverdlovsk Oblast
- Administrative district: Novolyalinsky District
- TownSelsoviet: Novaya Lyalya
- Founded: 1723
- Town status since: 1938
- Elevation: 100 m (330 ft)

Population (2010 Census)
  - Total: 12,734
  - Estimate (2025): 10,454 (−17.9%)

Administrative status
  - Capital of: Novolyalinsky District, town of Novaya Lyalya

Municipal status
  - Urban okrug: Novolyalinsky Urban Okrug
  - Capital of: Novolyalinsky Urban Okrug
- Time zone: UTC+5 (MSK+2)
- Postal code: 624400–624403
- OKTMO ID: 65716000001
- Website: nlyalyago.ru

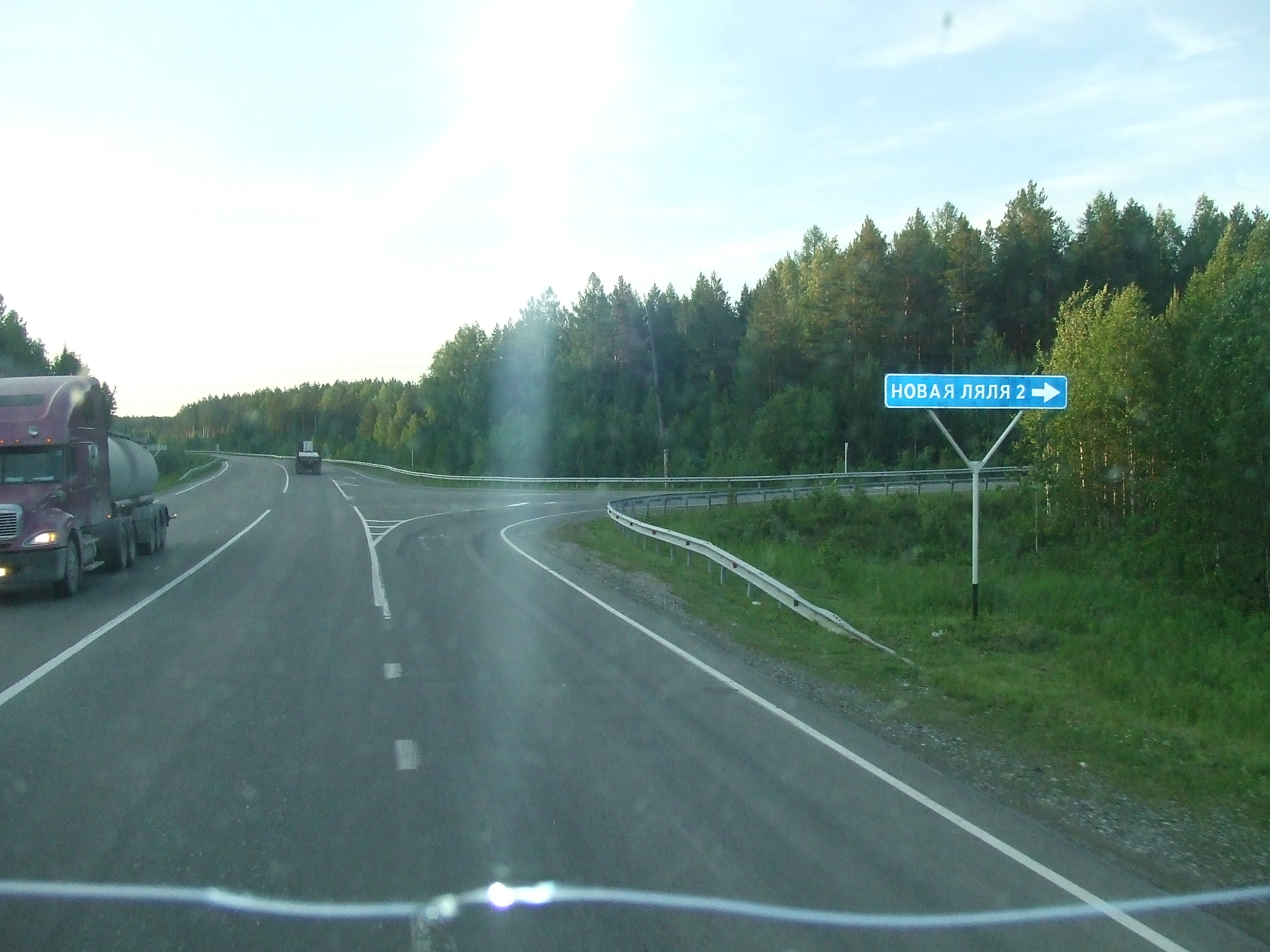

Novaya Lyalya (Russian: Но́вая Ля́ля) is a town and the administrative center of Novolyalinsky District in Sverdlovsk Oblast, Russia, located on the Lyalya River, 306 kilometers (190 mi) north of Yekaterinburg, the administrative center of the oblast. Population: 12,734 (2010 census); 14,584 (2002 census); 15,681 (1989 Soviet census).

== History ==
It was founded in 1723 as a settlement around a copper-melting plant (which closed by 1744). It was granted town status in 1938.

== Administrative and municipal status ==
Within the framework of administrative divisions, Novaya Lyalya serves as the administrative center of Novolyalinsky District. As an administrative division, it is, together with seven rural localities, incorporated within Novolyalinsky District as the Town of Novaya Lyalya. As a municipal division, the town of Novaya Lyalya together with sixteen rural localities in Novolyalinsky District are incorporated as Novolyalinsky Urban Okrug.
