= Serga (Sverdlovsk Oblast) =

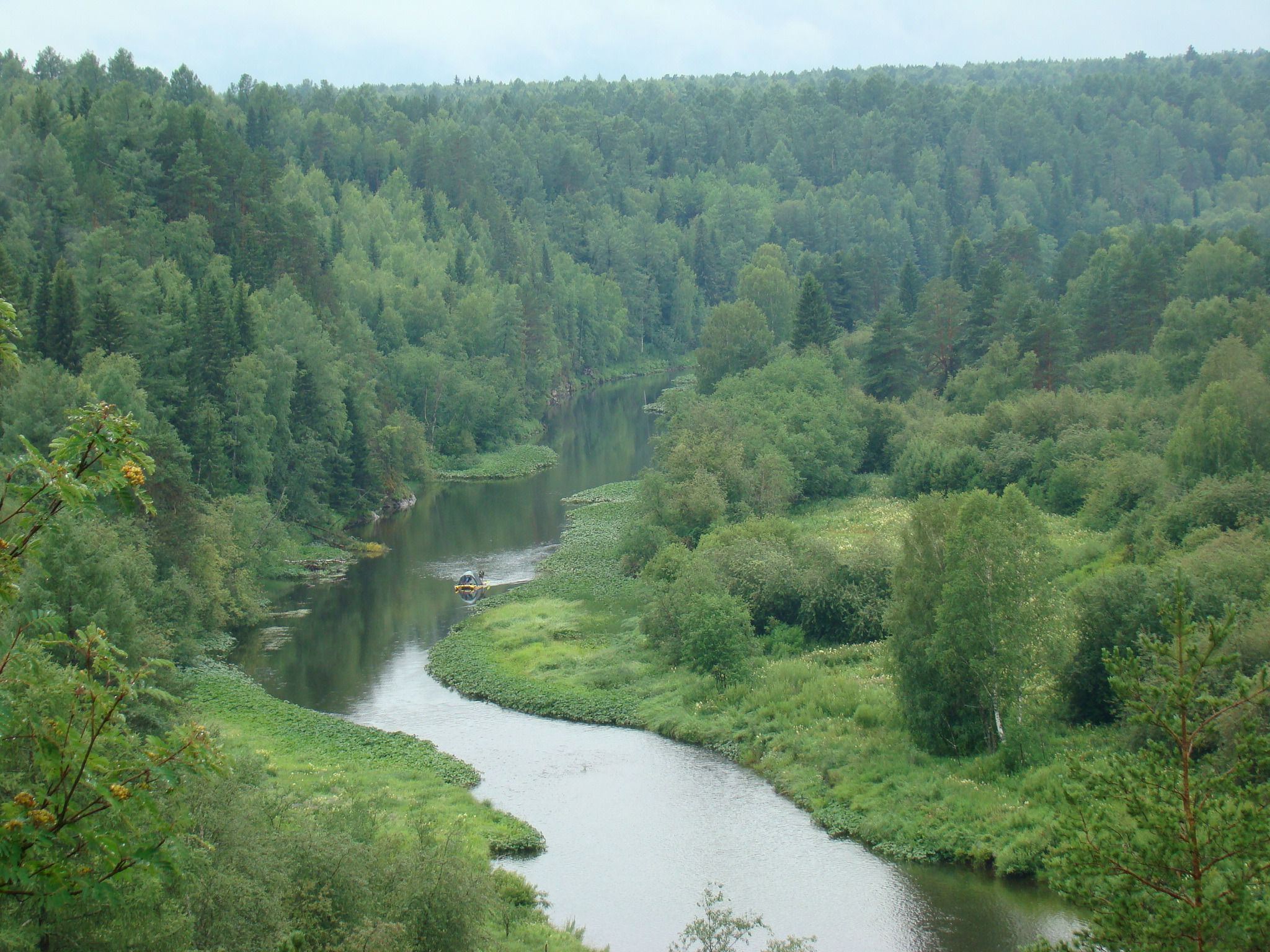
- Native name: Серга (Russian)

Location
- Country: Russia

Physical characteristics
- Mouth: Ufa
  - coordinates: 56°25′46″N 59°04′28″E
- Length: 113 km (70 mi)
- Basin size: 2,170 km^{2} (840 sq mi)

Basin features
- Progression: Ufa→ Belaya→ Kama→ Volga→ Caspian Sea

The Serga (Russian: Серга) is a river in Sverdlovsk Oblast, Russia. A right tributary of the Ufa, the Serga is 113 kilometres (70 mi) long, with a drainage basin of 2,170 square kilometres (840 mi^{2}).

The river is much used by rafters. The town of Nizhniye Sergi lies by the Serga.
