= Krasnoufimsky District =

District in Sverdlovsk Oblast, Russia

Krasnoufimsky District Красноуфимский район (Russian)
- District
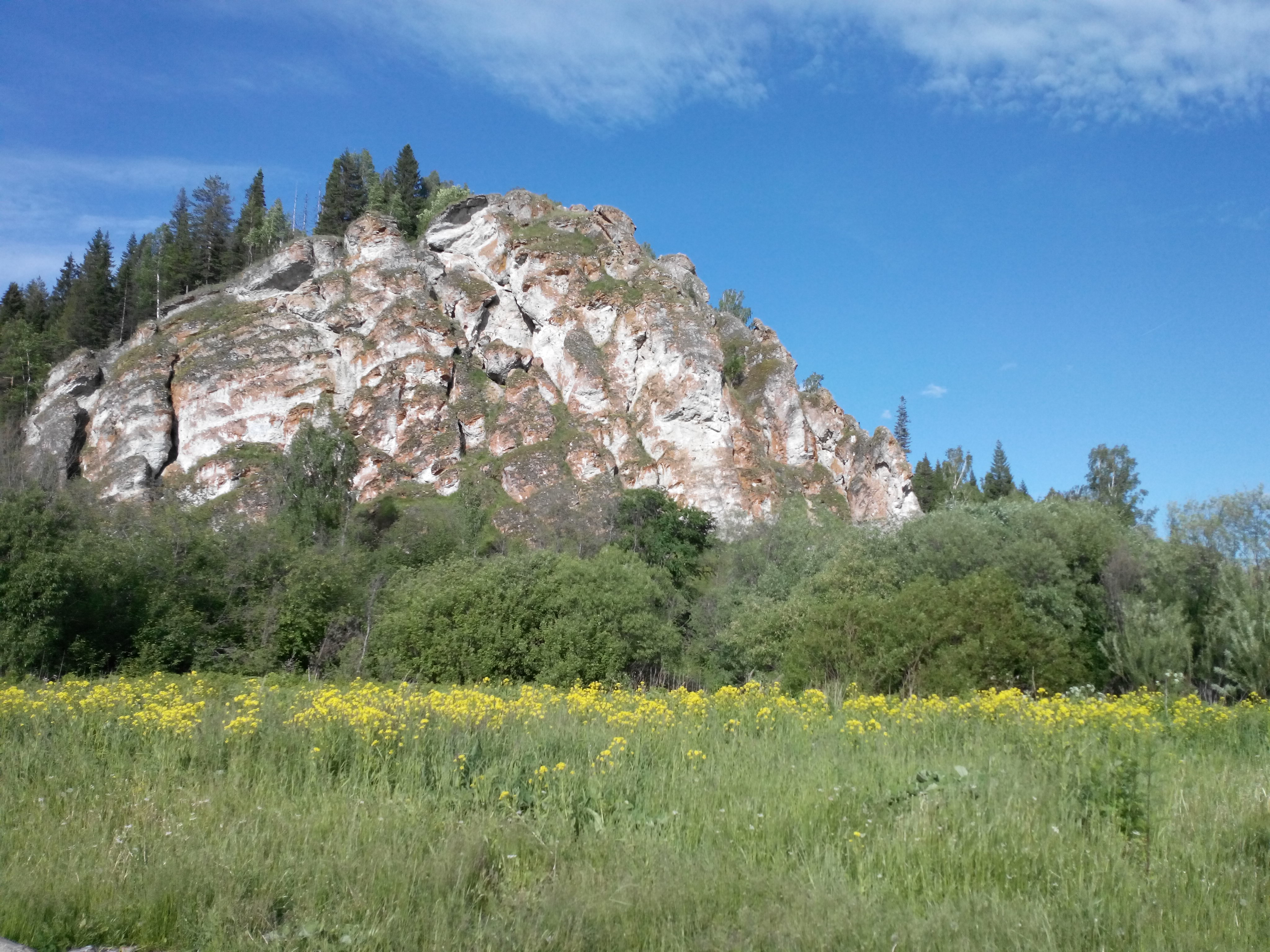
- Alikaev Stone, Krasnoufimsky District

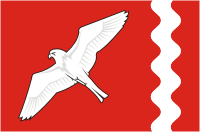
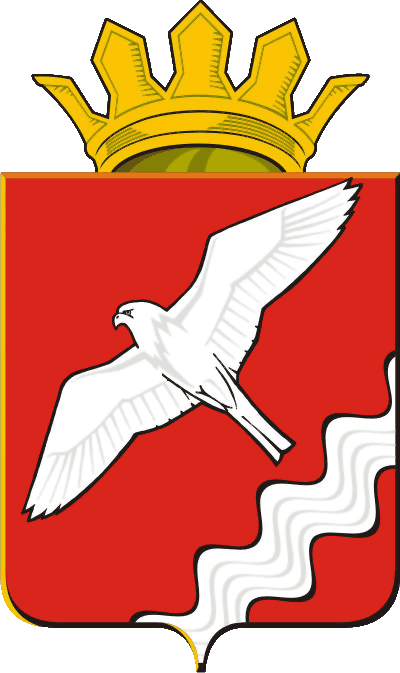
- Flag Coat of arms
- Location of Krasnoufimsky District in Sverdlovsk Oblast
- Coordinates: 56.517°N 57.149°E
- Country: Russia
- Federal subject: Sverdlovsk Oblast
- Established: 2006
- Administrative center: Krasnoufimsk

Area
  - Total: 3,411.8 km^{2} (1,317.3 sq mi)

Population (2010 Census)
  - Total: 28,077
  - Density: 8.2294/km^{2} (21.314/sq mi)
  - Urban: 6.8%
  - Rural: 93.2%

Administrative structure
  - Inhabited localities: 1 urban-type settlements, 67 rural localities

Municipal structure
  - Municipally incorporated as: Krasnoufimsky Urban Okrug
- Time zone: UTC+5 (MSK+2)
- OKTMO ID: 65539000
- Website: http://rkruf.ru/

Krasnoufimsky District (Russian: Красноуфи́мский райо́н) is an administrative district (raion), one of the thirty districts in Sverdlovsk Oblast, Russia. As a municipal division, it is incorporated as Krasnoufimsky Urban Okrug. Its administrative center is the town of Krasnoufimsk (which is not administratively a part of the district). Population: 28,077 (2010 Census); 31,581 (2002 census); 36,286 (1989 Soviet census).

== Administrative and municipal status ==
Within the framework of administrative divisions, Krasnoufimsky District is one of the thirty in the oblast. The town of Krasnoufimsk serves as its administrative center, despite being incorporated separately as an administrative unit with the status equal to that of the districts.

As a municipal division, the district is incorporated as Krasnoufimsky Urban Okrug. The Town of Krasnoufimsk is incorporated separately from the district as Krasnoufimsk Urban Okrug.

== Sources ==
- Областная Дума Законодательного Собрания Свердловской области. №105-ОЗ 23 декабря 2010 г. «Устав Свердловской обласит», в ред. Закона №56-ОЗ от 30 июня 2014 г. «О внесении изменений в Устав Свердловской области». Вступил в силу через 10 дней после официального опубликования (4 января 2011 г.), за исключением отдельных положений, вступивших в силу в иные сроки. Опубликован: "Областная газета", №466–467, 24 декабря 2010 г.. (Oblast Duma of the Legislative Assembly of Sverdlovsk Oblast. #105-OZ December 23, 2010 Charter of Sverdlovsk Oblast, as amended by the Law #56-OZ of June 30, 2014 On Amending the Charter of Sverdlovsk Oblast. Effective as of the day which is 10 days after the official publication date (January 4, 2011), with the exception of certain clauses which took effect on different dates.).
- Областная Дума Законодательного Собрания Свердловской области. Закон №153-ОЗ от 25 октября 2004 г. «Об установлении границ муниципального образования Красноуфимский район и наделении его статусом городского округа», в ред. Закона №85-ОЗ от 12 июля 2007 г. «О границах муниципальных образований, расположенных на территории Свердловской области». Вступил в силу с 31 декабря 2004 г. Опубликован: "Областная газета", №292–293, 29 октября 2004 г. (Oblast Duma of the Legislative Assembly of Sverdlovsk Oblast. Law #153-OZ of October 25, 2004 On Establishing the Borders of the Municipal Formation of Krasnoufimsky District and on Granting It Urban Okrug Status, as amended by the Law #85-OZ of July 12, 2007 On the Borders of the Municipal Formations Located on the Territory of Sverdlovsk Oblast. Effective as of December 31, 2004.).
- Областная Дума Законодательного Собрания Свердловской области. Закон №85-ОЗ от 12 июля 2007 г. «О границах муниципальных образований, расположенных на территории Свердловской области», в ред. Закона №107-ОЗ от 29 октября 2013 г. «Об упразднении отдельных населённых пунктов, расположенных на территории города Ивделя, и о внесении изменений в Приложение 39 к Закону Свердловской области "О границах муниципальных образований, расположенных на территории Свердловской области"». Вступил в силу через 10 дней после официального опубликования. Опубликован: "Областная газета", №232–249, 17 июля 2007 г. (Oblast Duma of the Legislative Assembly of Sverdlovsk Oblast. Law #85-OZ of July 12, 2007 On the Borders of the Municipal Formations on the Territory of Sverdlovsk Oblast, as amended by the Law #107-OZ of October 29, 2013 On Abolishing Several Inhabited Localities on the Territory of the Town of Ivdul and on Amending the Law of Sverdlovsk Oblast "On the Borders of the Municipal Formations on the Territory of Sverdlovsk Oblast". Effective as of the day which is 10 days after the official publication.).
