= Kamensky District, Sverdlovsk Oblast =

District in Sverdlovsk Oblast, Russia

Kamensky District Каменский район (Russian)
- District
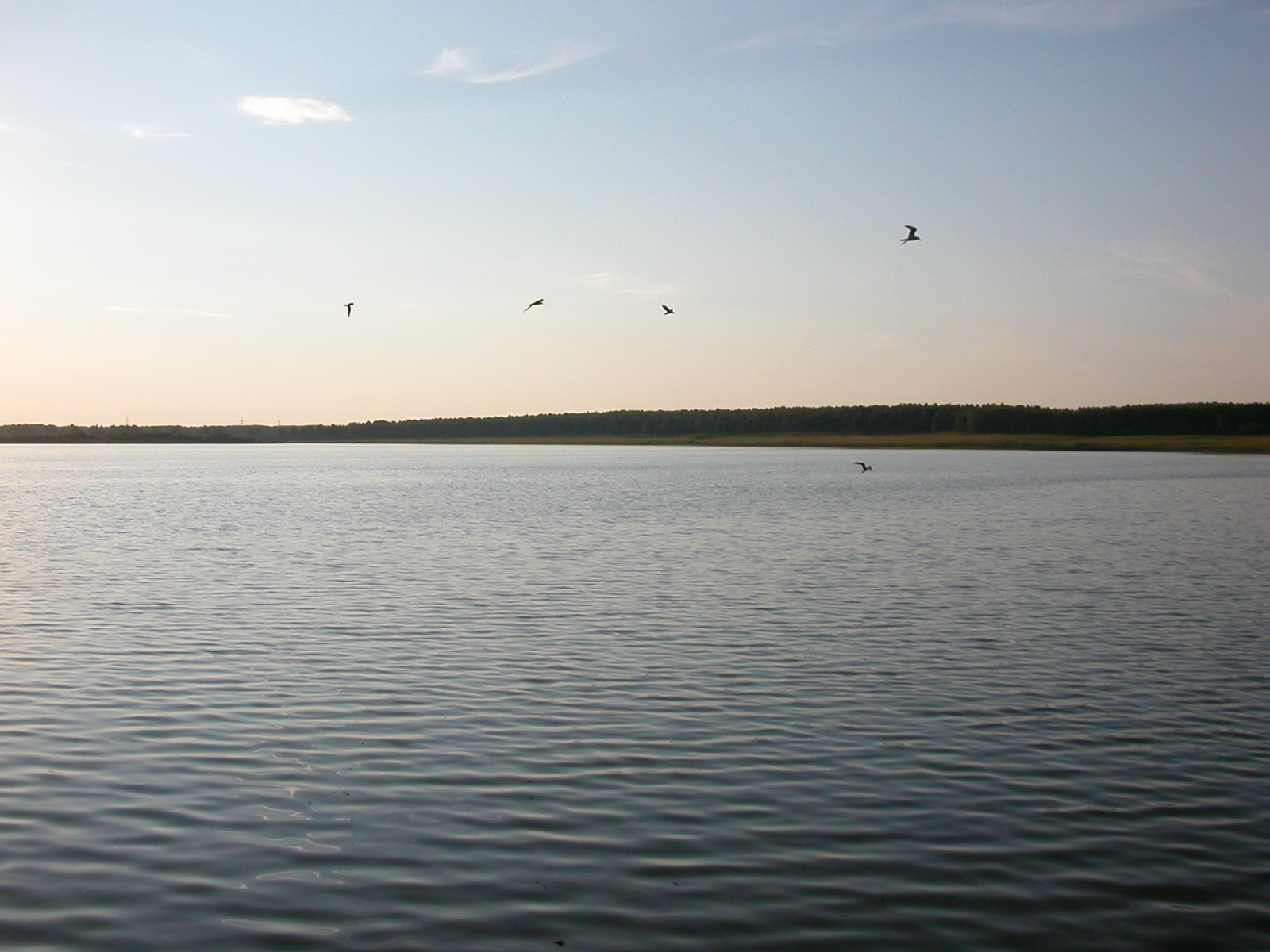
- Lake Boevka

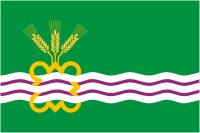
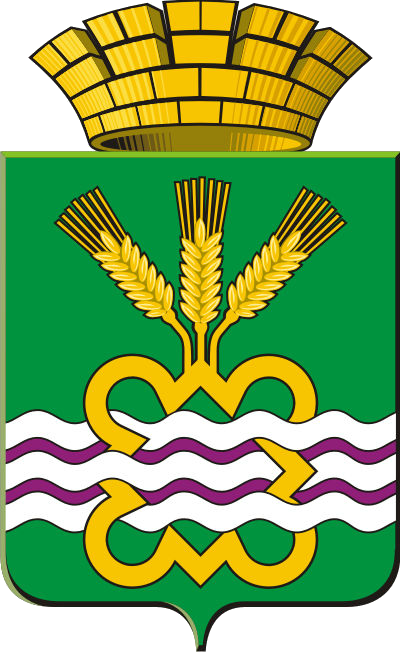
- Flag Coat of arms
- Location of Kamensky District in Sverdlovsk Oblast
- Coordinates: 56°24′N 61°56′E
- Country: Russia
- Federal subject: Sverdlovsk Oblast
- Established: 31 December 2004
- Administrative center: Kamensk-Uralsky

Area
  - Total: 2,146 km^{2} (829 sq mi)

Population (2010 Census)
  - Total: 28,111
  - Density: 13.10/km^{2} (33.93/sq mi)
  - Urban: 14.2%
  - Rural: 85.8%

Administrative structure
  - Inhabited localities: 1 urban-type settlements, 64 rural localities

Municipal structure
  - Municipally incorporated as: Kamensky Urban Okrug
- Time zone: UTC+5 (MSK+2)
- OKTMO ID: 65531000
- Website: http://www.kamensk-adm.ru

Kamensky District (Russian: Ка́менский райо́н) is an administrative district (raion), one of the thirty in Sverdlovsk Oblast, Russia. As a municipal division, it is incorporated as Kamensky Urban Okrug. The area of the district is 2,146 square kilometers (829 sq mi). Its administrative center is the city of Kamensk-Uralsky (which is not administratively a part of the district). Population: 28,111 (2010 Census); 29,669 (2002 census); 32,307 (1989 Soviet census).

== Administrative and municipal status ==
Within the framework of administrative divisions, Kamensky District is one of the thirty in the oblast. The city of Kamensk-Uralsky serves as its administrative center, despite being incorporated separately as an administrative unit with the status equal to that of the districts.

As a municipal division, the district is incorporated as Kamensky Urban Okrug. The City of Kamensk-Uralsky is incorporated separately from the district as Kamensk-Uralsky Urban Okrug.
