= Gari, Sverdlovsk Oblast =

Urban-type settlement in Sverdlovsk Oblast, Russia

Gari Гари
- Urban-type settlement
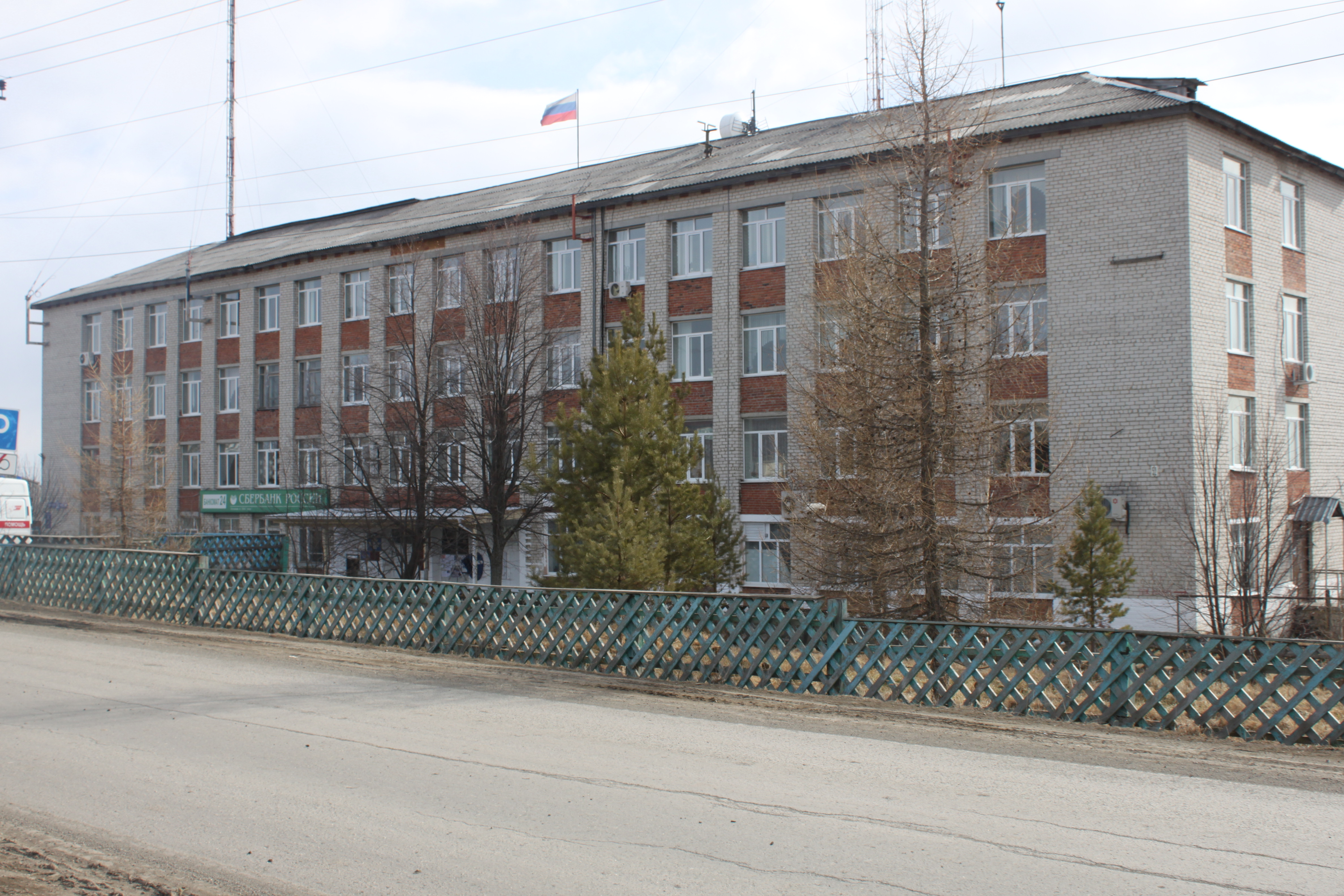
- Administration building of the Garinsky urban district

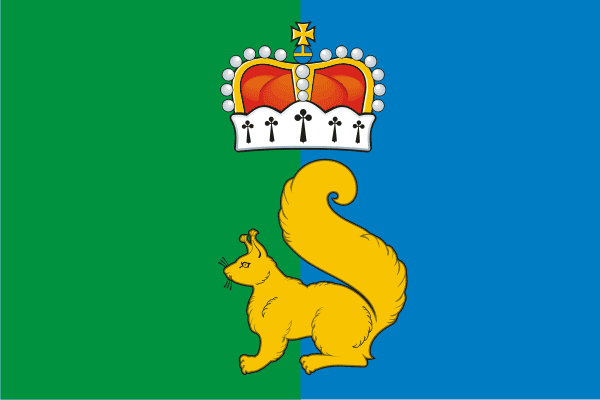
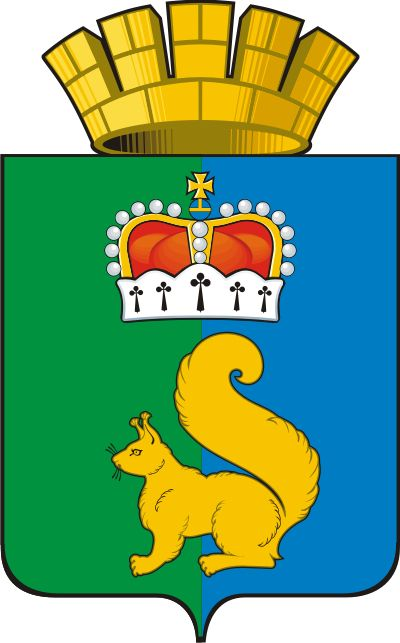
- Flag Coat of arms
- Interactive map of Gari
- Location of Gari Gari (Sverdlovsk Oblast)
- Coordinates: 59.4274°N 62.3527°E
- Country: Russia
- Federal subject: Sverdlovsk Oblast
- Administrative district: Garinsky District

Population (2010 Census)
  - Total: 2,472
  - Estimate (2025): 1,890 (−23.5%)
- Time zone: UTC+5 (MSK+2)
- Postal code: 624910
- OKTMO ID: 65710000051

Gari (Russian: Гари) is an urban locality (an urban-type settlement) in Garinsky District of Sverdlovsk Oblast, Russia. Population: 2,472 (2010 census); 3,186 (2002 census); 3,398 (1989 Soviet census).
