= Garinsky District =

District in Sverdlovsk Oblast, Russia

Garinsky District Гаринский район
- District
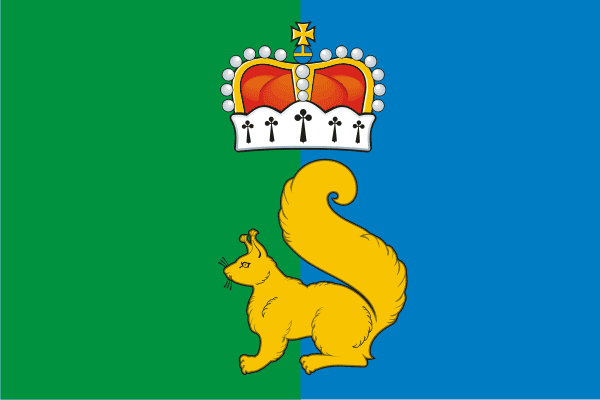
- Flag
- Location of Garinsky District in Sverdlovsk Oblast
- Coordinates: 59.433°N 62.310°E
- Country: Russia
- Federal subject: Sverdlovsk Oblast
- Administrative center: Gari

Area
  - Total: 16,770 km^{2} (6,470 sq mi)

Population (2010 Census)
  - Total: 4,904
  - Density: 0.2924/km^{2} (0.7574/sq mi)
  - Urban: 50.4%
  - Rural: 49.6%

Administrative structure
  - Inhabited localities: 1 urban-type settlements, 41 rural localities

Municipal structure
  - Municipally incorporated as: Garinsky Urban Okrug
- Website: http://admgari-sever.ru/

Garinsky District (Russian: Гаринский райо́н) is an administrative district (raion), one of the thirty in Sverdlovsk Oblast, Russia. As a municipal division, it is incorporated as Garinsky Urban Okrug. The area of the district is 16,770 square kilometers (6,470 sq mi). Its administrative center is the urban locality (a work settlement) of Gari. Population: 4,904 (2010 Census); 7,832 (2002 Census); 9,381 (1989 Soviet census). The population of Gari accounts for 50.4% of the district's total population. The main point of historical interest is the former town of Pelym, which was one of the first Russian settlements east of the Urals, marking the eastern terminus of the Cherdyn Road from Europe to Siberia.
