= Pyshminsky District =

District in Sverdlovsk Oblast, Russia

Pyshminsky District Пышминский район (Russian)
- District
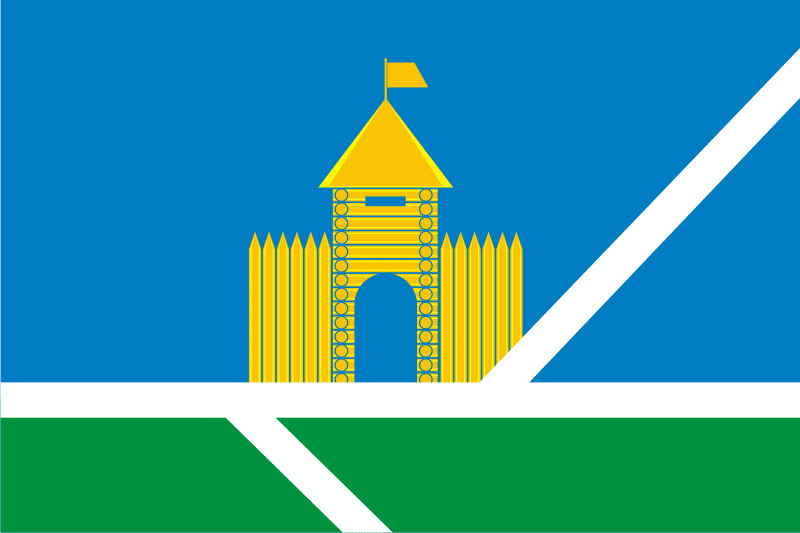
- Flag
- Location of Pyshminsky District in Sverdlovsk Oblast
- Coordinates: 56°52′N 63°13′E
- Country: Russia
- Federal subject: Sverdlovsk Oblast
- Established: 2006
- Administrative center: Pyshma

Area
  - Total: 1,899 km^{2} (733 sq mi)

Population (2010 Census)
  - Total: 20,614
  - Density: 10.86/km^{2} (28.11/sq mi)
  - Urban: 47.6%
  - Rural: 52.4%

Administrative structure
  - Administrative divisions: 1 Work settlements, 13 Selsoviets
  - Inhabited localities: 1 urban-type settlements, 44 rural localities

Municipal structure
  - Municipally incorporated as: Pyshminsky Urban Okrug
- Time zone: UTC+5 (MSK+2)
- OKTMO ID: 65718000
- Website: http://пышминский-го.рф

Pyshminsky District (Russian: Пышми́нский райо́н) is an administrative district (raion), one of the thirty in Sverdlovsk Oblast, Russia. As a municipal division, it is incorporated as Pyshminsky Urban Okrug. The area of the district is 1,899 square kilometers (733 sq mi). Its administrative center is the urban locality (a work settlement) of Pyshma. Population: 20,614 (2010 Census); 22,519 (2002 Census); 25,277 (1989 Soviet census). The population of Pyshma accounts for 47.6% of the district's total population.
