= Yolkino =

Settlement in Sverdlovsk Oblast, Russia

Yolkino Ёлкино
- Urban-type settlement
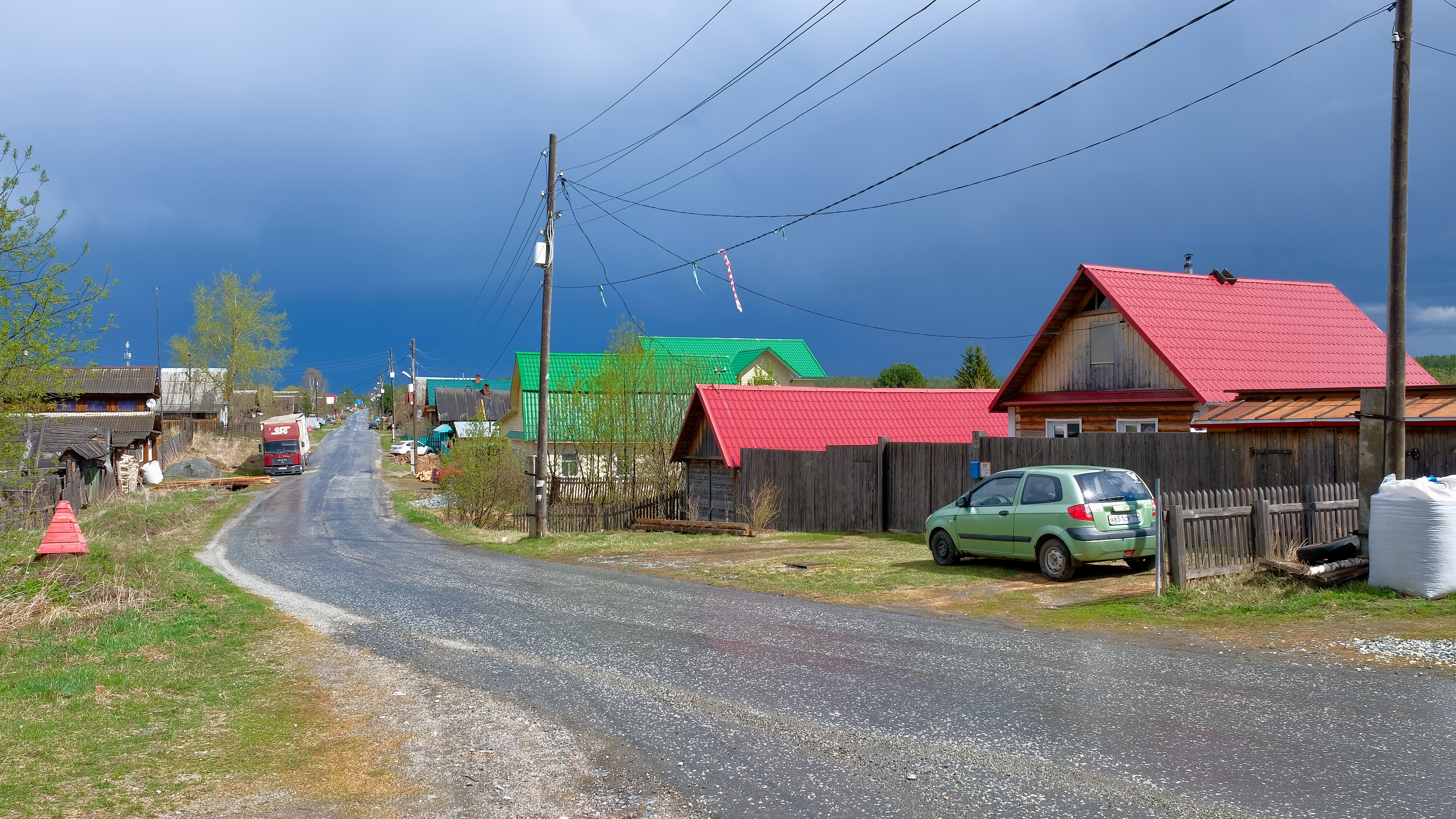
- Interactive map of Yolkino
- Location of Yolkino Yolkino (Sverdlovsk Oblast)
- Coordinates: 58.6919°N 59.8275°E
- Country: Russia
- Federal subject: Sverdlovsk Oblast

Population (2010 Census)
  - Total: 247
  - Estimate (2021): 137 (−44.5%)
- Time zone: UTC+5 (MSK+2)
- Postal code: 624214
- OKTMO ID: 65749000056

Yolkino (Russian: Ёлкино) is an urban locality (an urban-type settlement) in Sverdlovsk Oblast, Russia. Population: 247 (2010 census); 1,328 (2002 census); 1,307 (1989 Soviet census).
