= Krasnoufimsk =

Town in Sverdlovsk Oblast, Russia

Krasnoufimsk Красноуфимск
- Town
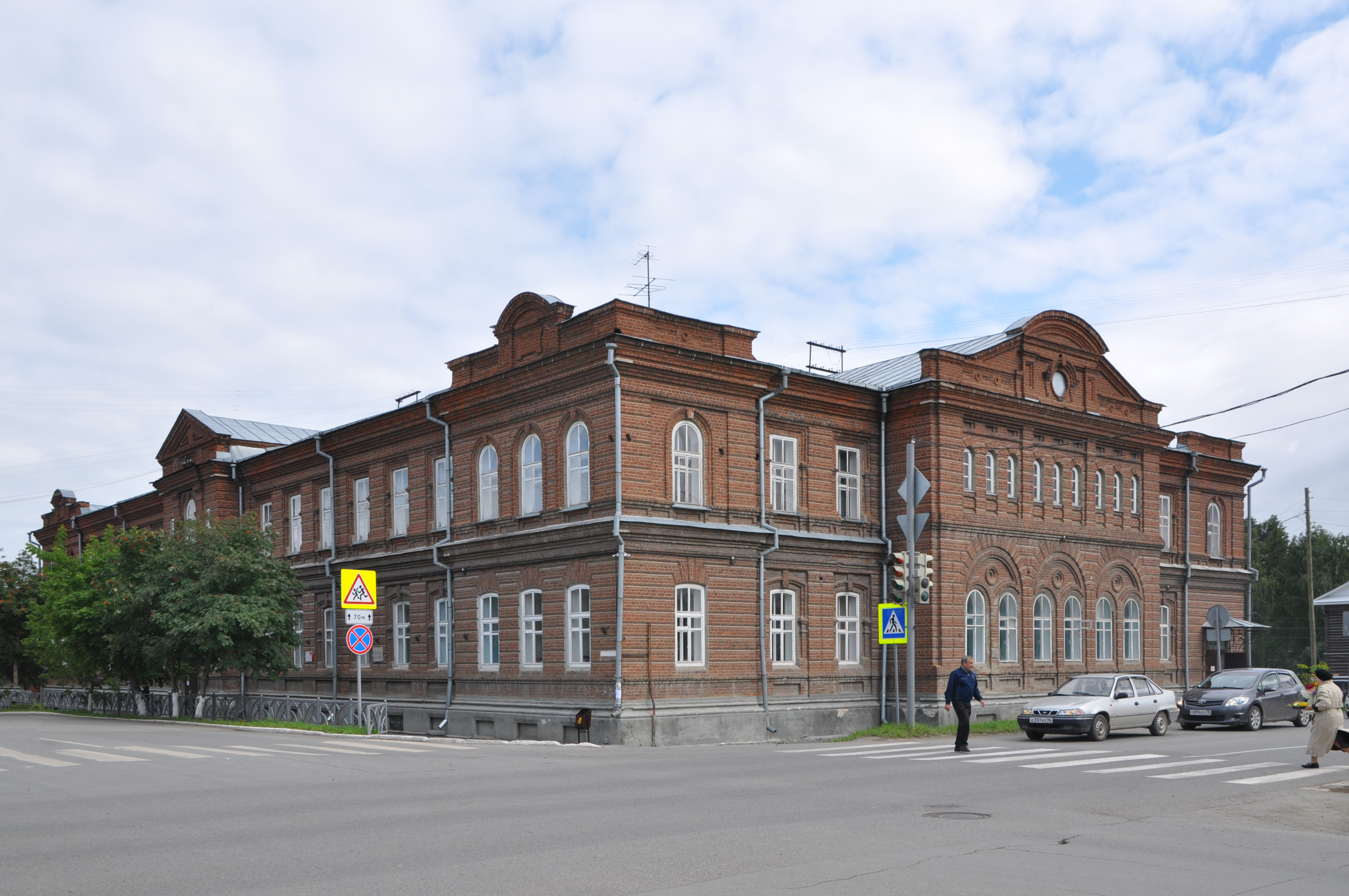

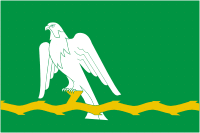
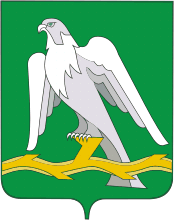
- Flag Coat of arms
- Interactive map of Krasnoufimsk
- Location of Krasnoufimsk Krasnoufimsk (Sverdlovsk Oblast)
- Coordinates: 56°37′00″N 57°46′20″E
- Country: Russia
- Federal subject: Sverdlovsk Oblast
- Founded: 1736
- Town status since: 1781
- Elevation: 210 m (690 ft)

Population (2010 Census)
  - Total: 39,765
  - Estimate (2025): 37,350 (−6.1%)

Administrative status
  - Subordinated to: Town of Krasnoufimsk
  - Capital of: Krasnoufimsky District, Town of Krasnoufimsk

Municipal status
  - Urban okrug: Krasnoufimsk Urban Okrug
  - Capital of: Krasnoufimsk Urban Okrug
- Time zone: UTC+5 (MSK+2)
- Postal code: 623300
- Dialing code: +7 34394
- OKTMO ID: 65747000001

Krasnoufimsk (Russian: Красноуфи́мск) is a town in Sverdlovsk Oblast, Russia, located on the Ufa River (a tributary of the Kama), 224 kilometers (139 mi) from Yekaterinburg. Population: 39,765 (2010 census); 43,595 (2002 census); 45,618 (1989 Soviet census).

== History ==
It was founded in 1736 as Krasnoufimskaya fortress that would defend the Ural manufactures from the raids of nearby tribes; it was granted the status of chief town of uyezd in 1781. In the beginning of the 18th century, the majority of the residents were Cossacks, bourgeois, and merchants of the third guild.

One of the main issues of the 19th century was the remoteness of Krasnoufimsk from the major cities of Perm and Yekaterinburg, and thus railroad. The town did not have any other transport links apart from unpaved roads and the Ufa river. Amongst its main economic activities at that time agriculture was considered one of the most valuable. The town's authorities strived to boost the development of industrial, agricultural, educational and medical sectors during the last quarter of 19th century by inviting some of the renowned specialists. On June 1, 1875, the first six-form real school was founded. Students could specialize either in mining or agricultural sciences.

Some Polish insurgents of the January Uprising were exiled in Krasnoufimsk in the 1860s.

In 1915, a railway station was finally built in Krasnoufimsk, and in 1916, railroad service was launched.

In 1930, Krasnoufimsk became the center of a large agricultural district. Significant investments in its infrastructure provided the town with a machine and tractor station, agriproducts processing plants, selective station, and other agriculture related enterprises.

During World War II, some of factories and plants were evacuated from the western regions of the Soviet Union, which amongst others included: All-Union Institute of Plant Cultivation; Kharkiv Institute of Mechanics and Machine-Building; Rostov and Ryazan factories.

During the later half of the 20th century town's authorities carried on the development of comfortable housing, and agribusiness infrastructure.

The coat of arms contain silver falcon with blue eyes sitting on a gold wavy belt on a green background was approved by the decision of the Krasnoufimsk City Council No. 5/5 dd. March 29, 2002.

== Administrative and municipal status ==
Within the framework of the administrative divisions, Krasnoufimsk serves as the administrative center of Krasnoufimsky District, even though it is not a part of it. As an administrative division, it is, together with four rural localities, incorporated separately as the Town of Krasnoufimsk—an administrative unit with the status equal to that of the districts. As a municipal division, the Town of Krasnoufimsk is incorporated as Krasnoufimsk Urban Okrug.

== Economy ==
Economy of Krasnoufimsk is characterized by a well-balanced multi-sectoral structure. 80% of entities are private. Citizens are mainly employed in transport, communication, trade, catering and industry. Majority of output is split nearly equally between building materials production sector, woodworking industry, energy, machine-building and metal-working. Agriculture remains of great importance to the economy of the town. SMEs contribute significantly to the development of Krasnoufimsk employing 14% of economically active citizens and being the source of 7% of local budget revenues.

=== Transportation ===
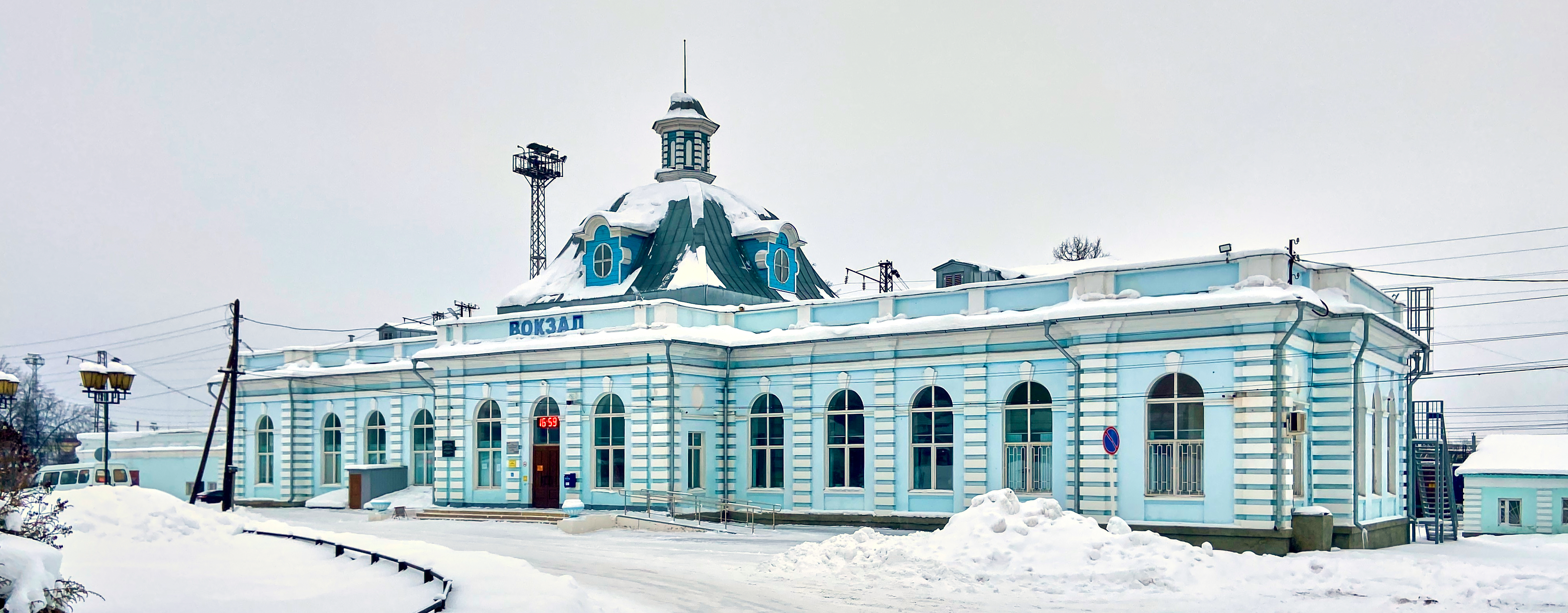
Railway station

Airport: regional airport of Krasnoufimsk; international airport of Koltsovo, Yekaterinburg (SVX).

==== Major companies ====
- OGUP Krasnoufimsk Experimental Factory specializes in production of stands, devices and instruments for testing, repair and adjustment of diesel engines
- ZAO Krasnoufimsk Milk Plant - dairy products
- OOO Zerno - bakery products
- OOO SMF Sibprodmontazh - bakery products
- OOO Engineering Enterprise "Technologies of Netherlands" - woodworking
- OOO Krasnoufimsk Building Materials Factory - building materials
- OOO Utyes - logging and woodworking
- OOO Krasnoufimsk Furniture-producing Plant - furniture

== Climate ==
Krasnoufimsk has a humid continental climate (Köppen climate classification Dfb). Winters are very cold with average temperatures from −20.3 °C (−4.5 °F) to −11.2 °C (11.8 °F) in January, while summers are warm with average temperatures from +12.1 °C (53.8 °F) to +24.2 °C (75.6 °F). Precipitation is moderate, and is somewhat higher in summer than at other times of the year.

Climate data for Krasnoufimsk
| Month | Jan | Feb | Mar | Apr | May | Jun | Jul | Aug | Sep | Oct | Nov | Dec | Year |
|---|---|---|---|---|---|---|---|---|---|---|---|---|---|
| Record high °C (°F) | 4.5 (40.1) | 7.5 (45.5) | 13.5 (56.3) | 28.7 (83.7) | 35.3 (95.5) | 36.6 (97.9) | 37.9 (100.2) | 36.3 (97.3) | 30.5 (86.9) | 24.5 (76.1) | 13.1 (55.6) | 4.8 (40.6) | 37.9 (100.2) |
| Mean daily maximum °C (°F) | −11.2 (11.8) | −9.0 (15.8) | −1.3 (29.7) | 8.9 (48.0) | 17.6 (63.7) | 22.7 (72.9) | 24.2 (75.6) | 21.4 (70.5) | 15.0 (59.0) | 5.7 (42.3) | −3.2 (26.2) | −9.0 (15.8) | 6.8 (44.3) |
| Daily mean °C (°F) | −15.4 (4.3) | −14.5 (5.9) | −7.2 (19.0) | 3.1 (37.6) | 10.9 (51.6) | 16.3 (61.3) | 18.1 (64.6) | 15.3 (59.5) | 9.5 (49.1) | 2.0 (35.6) | −6.5 (20.3) | −12.8 (9.0) | 1.6 (34.8) |
| Mean daily minimum °C (°F) | −20.3 (−4.5) | −19.9 (−3.8) | −12.7 (9.1) | −2.2 (28.0) | 4.5 (40.1) | 9.9 (49.8) | 12.1 (53.8) | 9.8 (49.6) | 5.1 (41.2) | −1.0 (30.2) | −10.2 (13.6) | −17.2 (1.0) | −3.5 (25.7) |
| Record low °C (°F) | −53.6 (−64.5) | −48.7 (−55.7) | −41.8 (−43.2) | −28.9 (−20.0) | −15.0 (5.0) | −5.3 (22.5) | 0.8 (33.4) | −2.8 (27.0) | −7.8 (18.0) | −27.6 (−17.7) | −42.7 (−44.9) | −49.7 (−57.5) | −53.6 (−64.5) |
| Average precipitation mm (inches) | 32.6 (1.28) | 24.2 (0.95) | 22.9 (0.90) | 29.2 (1.15) | 45.7 (1.80) | 66.2 (2.61) | 76.3 (3.00) | 64.5 (2.54) | 59.3 (2.33) | 52.0 (2.05) | 43.2 (1.70) | 35.9 (1.41) | 552 (21.72) |
| Average precipitation days (≥ 0.1 mm) | 20.4 | 15.3 | 16.9 | 9.4 | 11.8 | 11.3 | 6.8 | 10.2 | 11.9 | 15.9 | 19.6 | 20.6 | 170.1 |
| Average relative humidity (%) | 80.7 | 77.2 | 75.1 | 67.6 | 63.6 | 70.7 | 72.2 | 77.2 | 79.5 | 81.3 | 85.0 | 82.7 | 76.1 |
| Mean monthly sunshine hours | 49.6 | 95.2 | 142.6 | 213.0 | 251.1 | 268.5 | 282.1 | 218.6 | 138.0 | 69.8 | 46.5 | 37.2 | 1,812.2 |
Source: climatebase.ru

== Demographics ==
Economically active citizens (42%) and young citizens (31.4%) dominate in the age structure of the town, with 68% citizens are involved in primary and secondary sectors, and 32% employed in tertiary sectors. Rates of unemployment show clear downward-sloping trend primarily due to active local employment policies and dynamic development of the economy.

== Education ==
- Branch of Ural State Agricultural Academy
- Branch of Ural State Pedagogical University
- Center for Humanitarian Services
- Krasnoufimsk Agricultural College
- Krasnoufimsk Professional Agricultural Lyceum
- Krasnoufimsk Pedagogical College
- Krasnoufimsk Trade School #115
- Krasnoufimsk Trade School #97
- Krasnoufimsk Medical College
