= Irbitsky District =

District in Sverdlovsk Oblast, Russia

Irbitsky District Ирбитский район (Russian)
- District
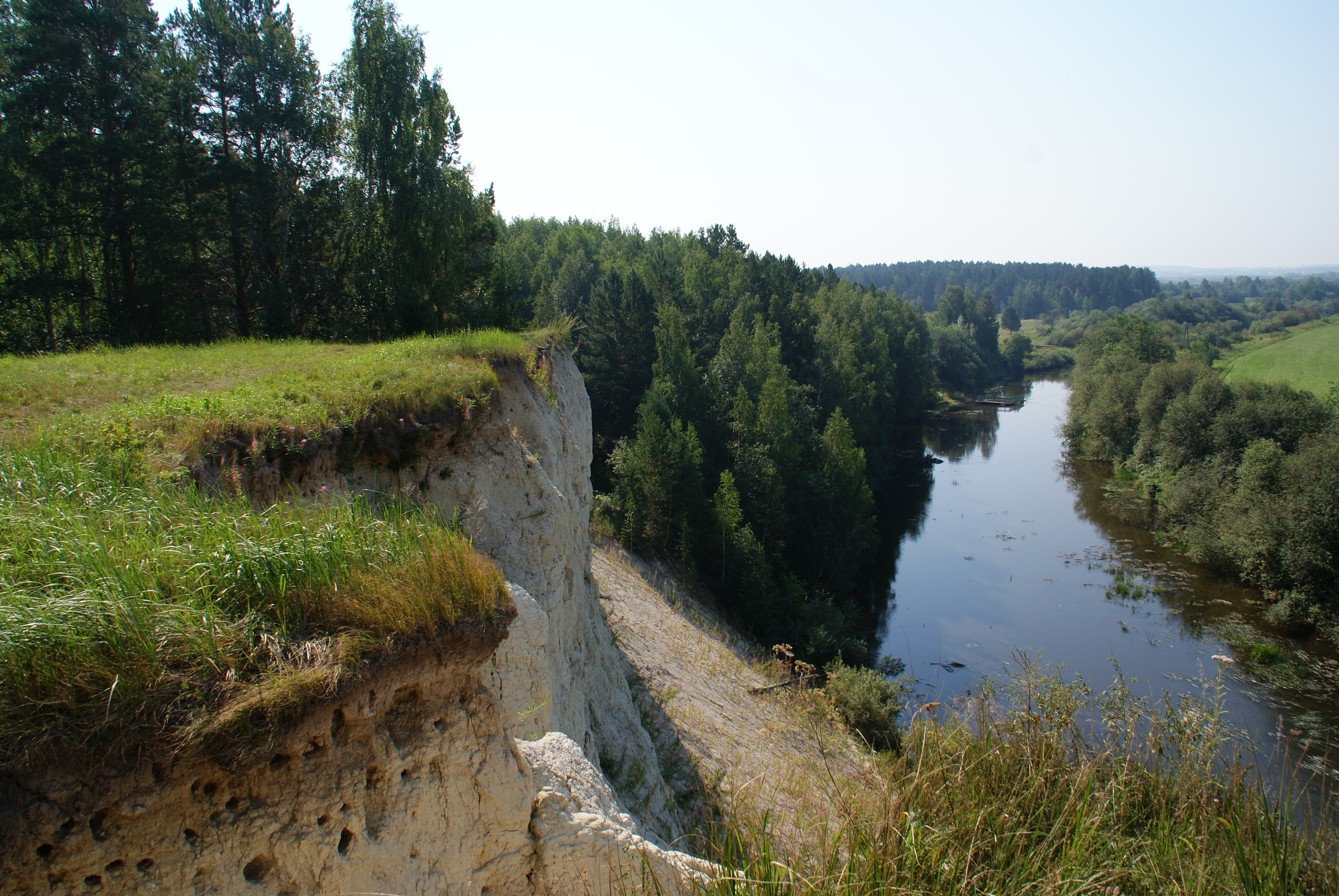
- "White Hill" Outcrop, Irbitsky District

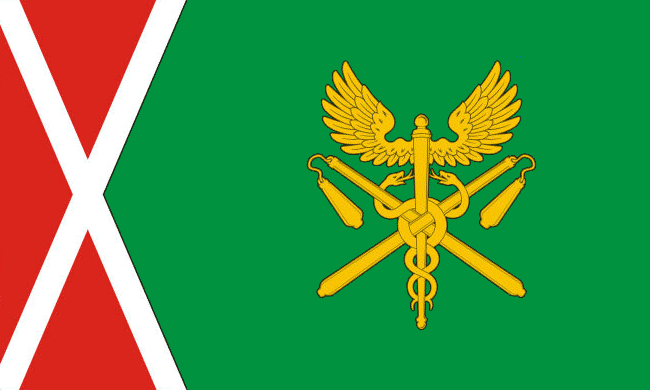
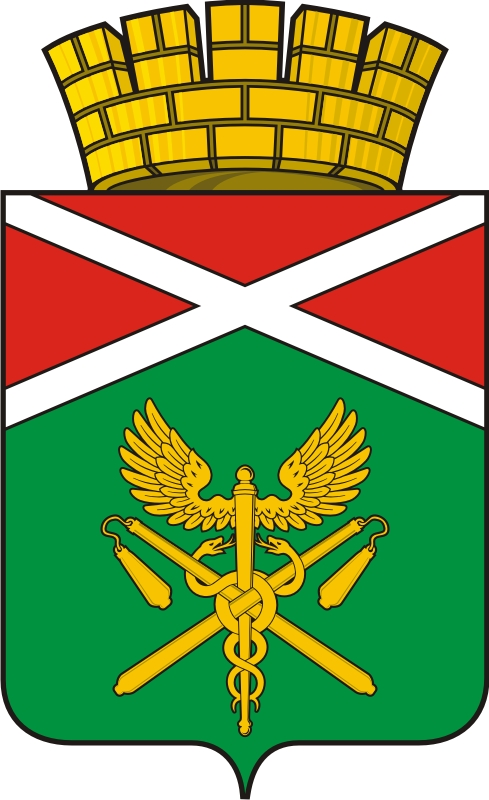
- Flag Coat of arms
- Location of Irbitsky District in Sverdlovsk Oblast
- Coordinates: 57.598°N 62.897°E
- Country: Russia
- Federal subject: Sverdlovsk Oblast
- Established: 27 February 1924
- Administrative center: Irbit

Area
  - Total: 4,722 km^{2} (1,823 sq mi)

Population (2010 Census)
  - Total: 30,331
  - Density: 6.423/km^{2} (16.64/sq mi)
  - Urban: 10.2%
  - Rural: 89.8%

Administrative structure
  - Administrative divisions: 1 Work settlements, 21 Selsoviets
  - Inhabited localities: 1 urban-type settlements, 105 rural localities

Municipal structure
  - Municipally incorporated as: Irbitskoye Urban Okrug
- Time zone: UTC+5 (MSK+2)
- OKTMO ID: 65711000
- Website: http://www.irbitskoemo.ru/

Irbitsky District (Russian: Ирбитский райо́н) is an administrative district (raion), one of the thirty in Sverdlovsk Oblast, Russia. As a municipal division, it is incorporated as Irbitskoye Urban Okrug. Its administrative center is the town of Irbit (which is not administratively a part of the district). Population: 30,331 (2010 Census); 33,350 (2002 census); 35,056 (1989 Soviet census).

== Administrative and municipal status ==
Within the framework of administrative divisions, Irbitsky District is one of the thirty in the oblast. The town of Irbit serves as its administrative center, despite being incorporated separately as an administrative unit with the status equal to that of the districts.

As a municipal division, the district is incorporated as Irbitskoye Urban Okrug. The Town of Irbit is incorporated separately from the district as Irbit Urban Okrug.
