= Pyshma, Sverdlovsk Oblast =

Urban-type settlement in Sverdlovsk Oblast, Russia

Pyshma Пышма
- Urban-type settlement
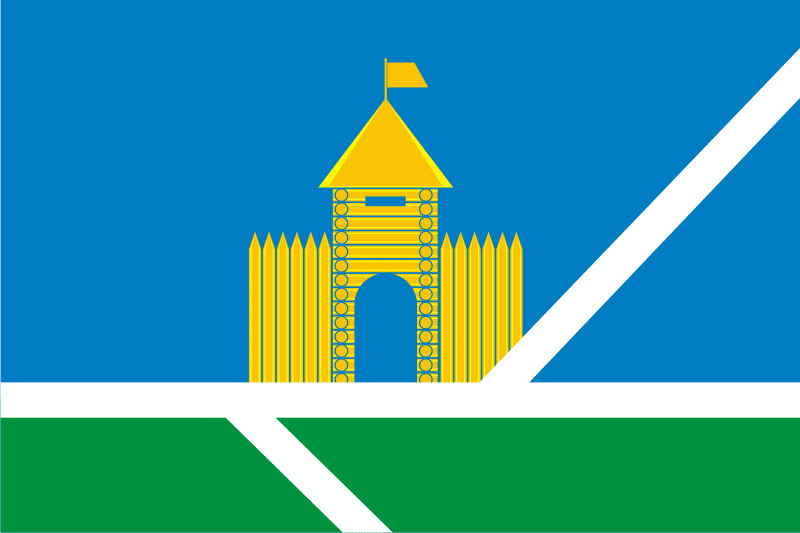
- Flag
- Interactive map of Pyshma
- Location of Pyshma Pyshma (Sverdlovsk Oblast)
- Coordinates: 56.9508°N 63.2487°E
- Country: Russia
- Federal subject: Sverdlovsk Oblast
- Administrative district: Pyshminsky District
- Founded: 1646

Population (2010 Census)
  - Total: 9,806
  - Estimate (2025): 9,010 (−8.1%)
- Time zone: UTC+5 (MSK+2)
- Postal code: 623550
- OKTMO ID: 65718000051

Pyshma (Russian: Пышма) is an urban locality (an urban-type settlement) in Pyshminsky District of Sverdlovsk Oblast, Russia. Population: 9,806 (2010 census); 10,262 (2002 census); 11,515 (1989 Soviet census).
