= Verkh-Isetsky City District =

Verkh-Isetsky Верх-Исетский
- Interactive map of Verkh-Isetsky
- Location of Verkh-Isetsky Verkh-Isetsky (Sverdlovsk Oblast)
- Coordinates: 56°50′00″N 60°32′54″E
- Country: Russia
- Federal subject: Sverdlovsk Oblast
- Founded: 1919

Government
  - Leader: Morozov Andrey Mikhailovich

Area
  - Total: 240 km^{2} (93 sq mi)

Population (2010 Census)
  - Total: 221,207
  - Estimate (2021): 240,822 (+8.9%)
  - Density: 920/km^{2} (2,400/sq mi)

Administrative status
  - Subordinated to: Yekaterinburg
- Dialing codes: +7 3432, 3433

Verkh-Isetsky (Верх-Исетский) City District is a city district in Yekaterinburg in Sveldlovsk Oblast, Russia. It contains two selsovets.

number 2 is Verkh-Isetsky

== See also ==
- Administrative divisions of Sverdlovsk Oblast
