= Ufa (river) =

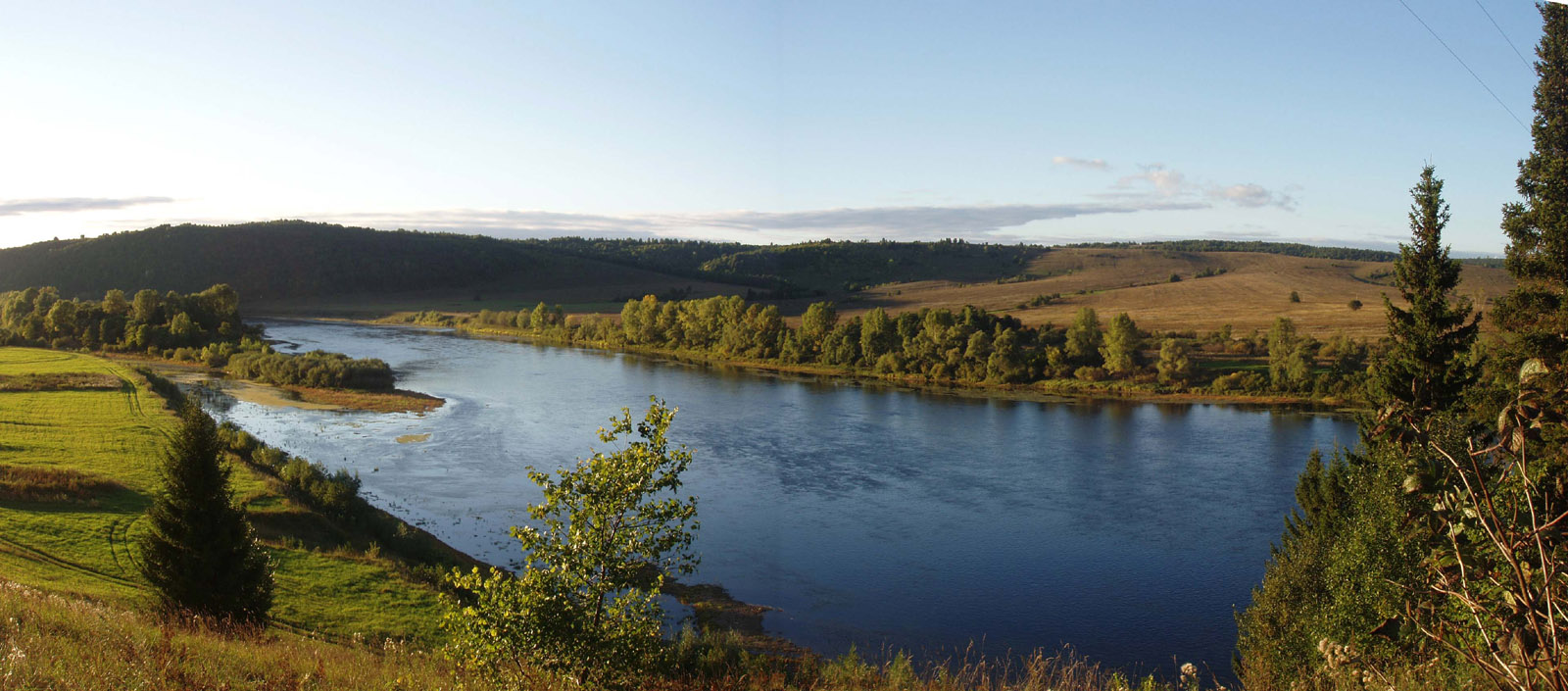
- Native name: Ҡариҙел (Bashkir); Уфа (Russian)

Location
- Country: Russia

Physical characteristics
- Mouth: Belaya
  - coordinates: 54°40′41″N 55°59′26″E
- Length: 918 km (570 mi)
- Basin size: 53,100 km^{2} (20,500 sq mi)
- Discharge
  - average: 388 m^{3}/s (13,700 cu ft/s)

Basin features
- Progression: Belaya→ Kama→ Volga→ Caspian Sea

The Ufa (Russian: Уфа; Bashkir: Ҡариҙел, romanized: Qariźel, lit. 'the Black Idel') is a river in the Ural Mountains, Chelyabinsk Oblast, Sverdlovsk Oblast, and the Republic of Bashkortostan in Russia; a right tributary of the river Belaya. It is 918 kilometres (570 mi) long, and its basin covers 53,100 square kilometres (20,500 mi^{2}). It freezes up between late October and early December and stays ice-bound until April or May. Pavlovka Hydroelectric Station is on the Ufa. The river's water is widely used for water supply. The main ports are Krasnoufimsk and Ufa (at the mouth of the river).

== Etymology ==
There are several theories for the etymology of the name of the Ufa River. Rail Kuzeev, citing A.A. Kamalov, writes that the name Ufa derives from the Baltic root upe, "river". According to A. K. Matveev, the name of the river is of Iranian origin, from *ap (cf. Persian ab), "water". This name could have been given by the Iranian-speaking steppe peoples who lived in the Southern Urals in the period from the Early Bronze Age to the Middle Ages. Jalil Keyekbaev traced the name Ufa through the intermediate form Ova or Uva to the word va, "river", in the Komi language. Talmas Garipov explains the name Ufa as the combination of the Hungarian o “old, ancient” and foyo “river” or of the combination of uy “new” and foyo.

== Tributaries ==
The largest tributaries of the Ufa are, from source to mouth:

- Serga (right)
- Bisert (right)
- Ay (left)
- Tyuy (right)
- Yuryuzan (left)
- Usa (right)
