= Achit (urban-type settlement) =

Urban-type settlement in Sverdlovsk Oblast, Russia

Achit Ачит
- Urban-type settlement
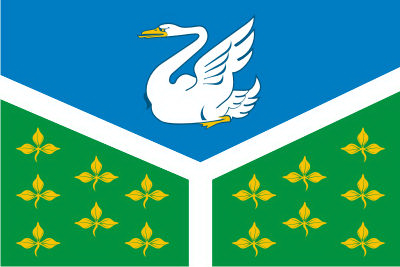
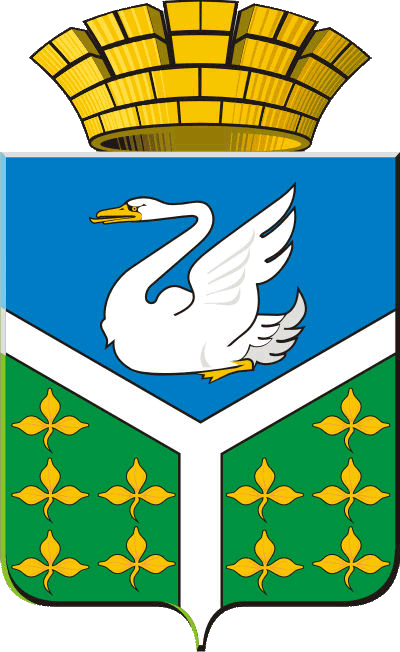
- Flag Coat of arms
- Interactive map of Achit
- Location of Achit Achit (Sverdlovsk Oblast)
- Coordinates: 56°47′47″N 57°43′43″E
- Country: Russia
- Federal subject: Sverdlovsk Oblast
- Administrative district: Achitsky District
- Founded: 1735
- Elevation: 233 m (764 ft)

Population (2010 Census)
  - Total: 4,938
  - Estimate (2025): 4,509 (−8.7%)
- Time zone: UTC+5 (MSK+2)
- Postal code: 623230
- OKTMO ID: 65705000051

Achit (Russian: Ачит) is an urban locality (a work settlement) and the administrative center of Achitsky District of Sverdlovsk Oblast, Russia. Population: 4,938 (2010 census); 5,120 (2002 census); 5,565 (1989 Soviet census).
