= Druzhinino, Vologda Oblast =

Druzhinino Дружинино
- Village
- Location within Vologda Oblast Location within Russia
- Coordinates: 60°18′N 39°30′E
- Country: Russia
- Region: Vologda Oblast
- District: Kharovsky District
- Time zone: UTC+3:00

Druzhinino (Russian: Дружинино) is a rural locality (a village) in Azletskoye Rural Settlement, Kharovsky District, Vologda Oblast, Russia. The population was 10 as of 2002.

== Geography ==
Druzhinino is located 65 km northwest of Kharovsk (the district's administrative centre) by road. Gridinskaya is the nearest rural locality.
