= Nizhniye Sergi =

Town in Sverdlovsk Oblast, Russia

Nizhniye Sergi Нижние Серги
- Town
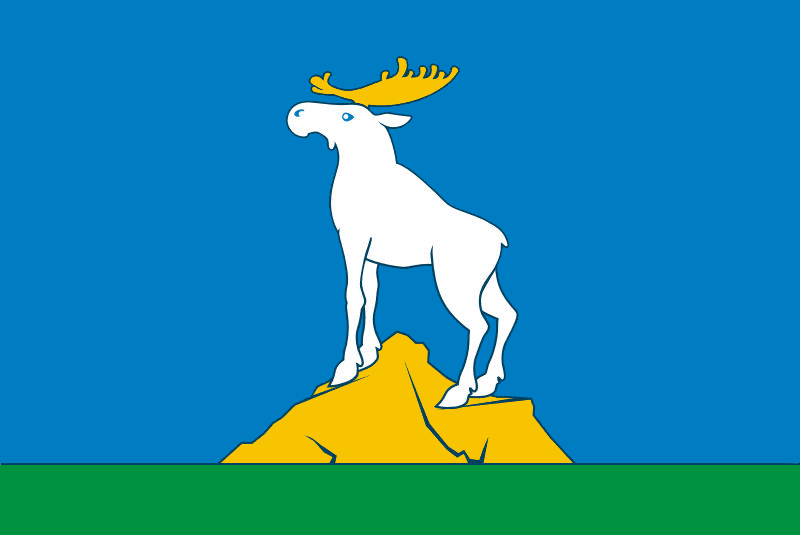
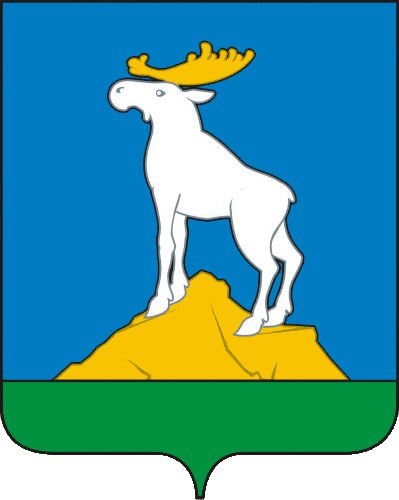
- Flag Coat of arms
- Interactive map of Nizhniye Sergi
- Location of Nizhniye Sergi Nizhniye Sergi (Sverdlovsk Oblast)
- Coordinates: 56°40′N 59°19′E
- Country: Russia
- Federal subject: Sverdlovsk Oblast
- Administrative district: Nizhneserginsky District
- TownSelsoviet: Nizhniye Sergi
- Founded: 1743
- Elevation: 320 m (1,050 ft)

Population (2010 Census)
  - Total: 10,336
  - Estimate (2025): 7,598 (−26.5%)

Administrative status
  - Capital of: Nizhneserginsky District, town of Nizhniye Sergi

Municipal status
  - Municipal district: Nizhneserginsky Municipal District
  - Urban settlement: Nizhneserginskoye Urban Settlement
  - Capital of: Nizhneserginsky Municipal District, Nizhneserginskoye Urban Settlement
- Time zone: UTC+5 (MSK+2)
- Postal codes: 623090, 623091, 623093, 623094, 623099
- Dialing code: +7 34396
- OKTMO ID: 65628101001

Nizhniye Sergi (Russian: Ни́жние Серги́) is a town and the administrative center of Nizhneserginsky District in Sverdlovsk Oblast, Russia, located on a rolling plain surrounded by the Ural Mountains, on the Serga River 120 kilometers (75 mi) from Yekaterinburg, the administrative center of the oblast. Population: 10,336 (2010 census); 12,567 (2002 census); 14,938 (1989 Soviet census).

== History ==
It was founded in 1743.

== Administrative and municipal status ==
Within the framework of the administrative divisions, Nizhniye Sergi serves as the administrative center of Nizhneserginsky District. As an administrative division, it is, together with eleven rural localities, incorporated within Nizhneserginsky District as the Town of Nizhniye Sergi. As a municipal division, the Town of Nizhniye Sergi is incorporated within Nizhneserginsky Municipal District as Nizhneserginskoye Urban Settlement.

== Economy ==
The town is an industrial center. The basis of its economy is mainly a plant that produces nails, wires, and other products of ferrous metallurgy. Most of the production output is exported.

=== Tourism ===
Nizhniye Sergi, with its Lake Montayevo health resort, is a popular destination in the Ural region. The health resort is known for its mineral water that includes thirty-seven chemical elements.
