= Nizhneserginsky District =

District in Sverdlovsk Oblast, Russia

Nizhneserginsky District Нижнесергинский район (Russian)
- District
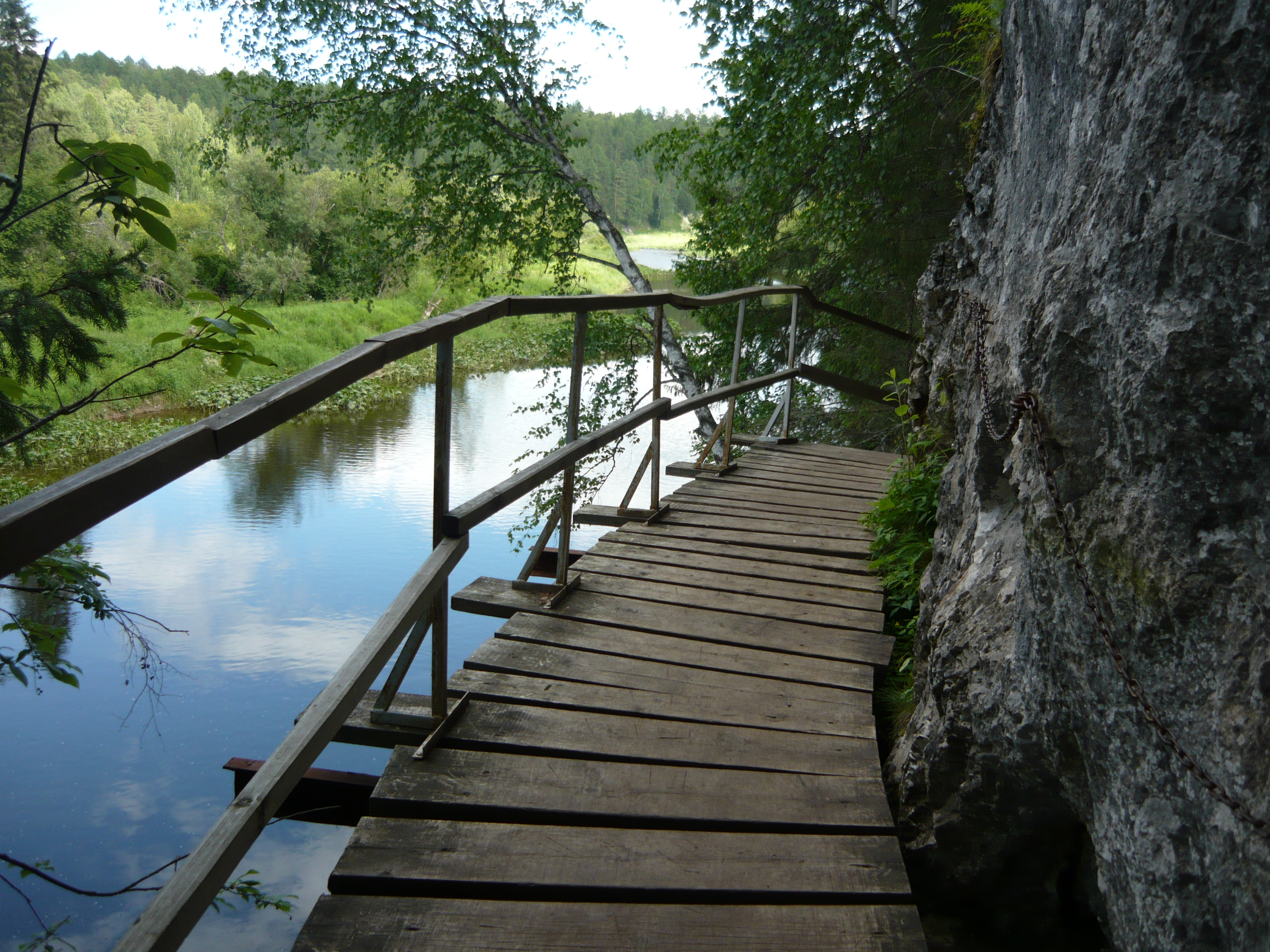
- Deer Springs, Nizhneserginsky District

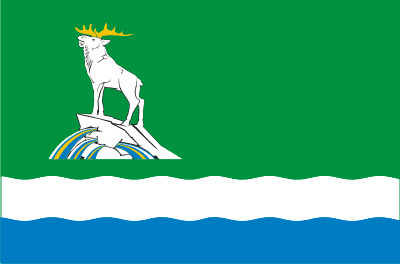
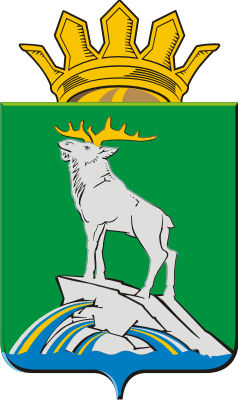
- Flag Coat of arms
- Location of Nizhneserginsky District in Sverdlovsk Oblast
- Coordinates: 56.640°N 58.001°E
- Country: Russia
- Federal subject: Sverdlovsk Oblast
- Established: 1924
- Administrative center: Nizhniye Sergi

Area
  - Total: 3,689.8 km^{2} (1,424.6 sq mi)

Population (2010 Census)
  - Total: 55,135
  - Density: 14.943/km^{2} (38.701/sq mi)
  - Urban: 79.3%
  - Rural: 20.7%

Administrative structure
  - Inhabited localities: 2 cities/towns, 4 urban-type settlements, 37 rural localities

Municipal structure
  - Municipally incorporated as: Nizhneserginsky Municipal District
  - Municipal divisions: 5 urban settlements, 1 rural settlements
- Time zone: UTC+5 (MSK+2)
- OKTMO ID: 65628000
- Website: http://admnsergi.ru/

Nizhneserginsky District (Russian: Нижнесерги́нский райо́н) is an administrative district (raion), one of the thirty in Sverdlovsk Oblast, Russia. As a municipal division, it is incorporated as Nizhneserginsky Municipal District. The area of the district is 3,689.8 square kilometers (1,424.6 sq mi). Its administrative center is the town of Nizhniye Sergi. Population: 55,135 (2010 Census); 60,512 (2002 census); 72,257 (1989 Soviet census). The population of Nizhniye Sergi accounts for 18.8% of the district's total population.

== History ==
It was formed on February 27, 1924 as part of the Yekaterinburg District of the Ural Region as the Serginsky District. There is no exact information about the date of the name change.

In 1925, the Bisertsky district was separated from the Nizhneserginsky district, which was then abolished.

On January 17, 1934, after the liquidation of the Ural region, the district became part of the Sverdlovsk region.

On April 22, 1937, the Decree of the Presidium of the Regional Executive Committee No. 2284 was issued on the assignment of the village. at the Verkhneserginsky plant to the category of workers' settlements with the assignment of the name Upper Sergi. By the decree of the All-Russian Central Executive Committee of January 8, 1938, the settlement was transformed into a workers' settlement.

On November 16, 1938, the Druzhinino settlement was transformed into a working settlement.

July 9, 1939:

from the Nizhneserginsky village council were transferred to the Nakoryakovsky village council of the village. Malinovsky, Platinovsky, Sikildsky and Tochkovsky forest areas; in Polovinsky - pos. Gubnyaevskaya Farm, railway barracks 292 km and the village. Sobarovsky forest area; in Arakaevsky - pos. Gubaevsky and Midday forest areas; settlement railway Art. Nizhnie Sergi, the Nizhneserginsky resort and the Nizhnebardymsky coal furnaces were included in the workers' settlement, and the village. Verkhnebardymsky coal furnaces, farms of the Nizhneserginsky resort, railway. the barracks of 273 km and the Buysky forest cordon are administratively subordinate to the Nizhneserginsky council. On August 27, the settlements of Nikolaevka, Mikarushino, Maniska, Kosolapova and Palnikovo were transferred from the Mikhailovsky village council to the administrative subordination of the Ayushinsky village council of the Nyazepetrovsky district of the Chelyabinsk region.

On August 7, 1940, the settlements of Andreevskaya Zaimka, Revdelsky cordon, Revdelsky senoplast, pos. forest plots Verkhnebardymsky, Svetloye Ozero and Yastrebok were transferred from the Nizhneserginsky and Verkhneserginsky village councils to the Arakaevsky village council.

7 December s. Grobovo was renamed into Pervomayskoye and Grobovsky village council - into Pervomaisky.

On April 16, 1941, the settlements of Berdyashka of the Potashkinsky Village Council and Krasnaya Berdyashka of the Berezovsky Village Council of the Artinsky District were transferred to the Tyulgashsky Village Council of the Nizhneserginsky District.

By decrees of the Presidium of the Supreme Soviet of the RSFSR of June 18, June 26 and July 6, the settlement at the Mikhailovsky Plant was classified as a workers' settlement with the name Mikhailovsky. The village of Voronovo and the village were included in the boundaries of the workers' settlement. New.

On November 27, 1942, the village of Tagil Kordon was subordinated to the Basyanovsky Council.

On February 20, 1943, Nizhniye Sergi was transformed into a city of regional subordination.

By decrees of the Presidium of the Supreme Council of the RSFSR of October 2, 9, 16 and November 13, the settlement at the Bisert Machine-Building Plant was classified as a workers' settlement with the name Bisert.

On November 2, 1945, the Bisertsky district was separated from the Nizhneserginsky district, which included the Bisert and Vaskinsky, Kirgishansky, Nakoryakovsky, Starobukharovsky and Talitsky village councils.

December 23, 1949 railway Art. The Mikhailovsky Plant was transferred from the Arakaevsky Village Council to the administrative subordination of the Mikhailovsky Council.

June 28, 1954 Farm No. 1 of the Krasnoarmeets stud farm was transferred from the Tyulgashinsky village council to the Shokurovsky village council, Polovinsky village council was merged with Arakaevsky.

On January 23, 1956, the settlements of Russkaya Sharama and Tatarskaya Sharama were transferred from the Ufa village council to Ufa-Shigirinsky.

On March 8, the Akbash village council was formed, which included the village of Akbash (center) and the forest cordon Bigildyash from the Ufimsky village council; the village of Perepryazhka, Sharama's lodge and the forest cordon of Maidala from the Shokurovsky village council.

On March 9, 1959, Bisertsky district was merged with Nizhneserginsky.

On May 13, the village of Olkhovka of the Kiselevsky village council, Sazhina and Polovinka of the Klenovsky village council of the Nizhneserginsky district were transferred to the Tyushinsky village council of the Achitsky district.

On January 13, 1960, the Pervomaisky Village Council was attached to the Druzhininsky Council.

On March 11, the Kiselevsky village council was merged with Klenovsky.

November 25:

Akbash village council was abolished; the settlements of Akbash, Maidala and Sharama were transferred to the Ufa-Shigirinsky village council, the village of Perepryazhka to the Shokurovsky village council; the center of the Ufa-Shigirinsky village council was moved to the village. Sharama, Ufa-Shigirinsky village council renamed Sharaminsky; The Ufa Village Council was merged with the Mikhailovsky Council, with. Ufimka was included in the line of the Mikhailovsky district; The village of Polovinka was transferred from the Arakaevsky village council to the administrative-territorial subordination of the Nizhneserginsky city council. On January 9, 1961, the Mikhailovsky settlement was transformed into a city of district subordination and renamed Mikhailovsk.

On January 13, Pervomaisky Village Council was merged with the Druzhininsky Council.

On December 7, 1962, the village of Ovinovka was transferred from the Nakoryakovsky village council to Klenovsky.

On February 1, 1963, the city of Nizhniye Sergi was classified as a city of regional subordination. Arakaevsky, Kirgishansky, Klenovsky, Nakoryakovsky, Starobukharovsky, Talitsky,
