= Nizhny Tagil constituency =

Russian legislative constituency

Nizhny Tagil single-member constituency
- Constituency of the Russian State Duma
- Deputy: Aleksey Svalov; United Russia
- Federal subject: Sverdlovsk Oblast
- Districts: Gornouralsky, Kirovgrad, Kushva, Nevyansky, Nizhny Tagil, Sredneuralsk, Svobodny, Verkhnyaya Pyshma, Verkhnyaya Tura
- Voters: 462,481 (2026)

The Nizhny Tagil constituency (No.172 (Note: No.163 in 1993-1995, No.164 in 1995-2007, No.171 in 2016–2026)) is a Russian legislative constituency in Sverdlovsk Oblast. The constituency covers west-central Sverdlovsk Oblast, including major industrial city of Nizhny Tagil, Yekaterinburg's satellite cities Sredneuralsk and Verkhnyaya Pyshma.

The constituency has been represented since 2026 by United Russia deputy Aleksey Svalov, former Member of Legislative Assembly of Sverdlovsk Oblast and Ural Mining and Metallurgical Company PR director, who won the open seat, succeeding one-term United Russia incumbent Konstantin Zakharov.

== Boundaries ==
1993–1995: Kirovgrad, Nizhny Tagil, Nizhnyaya Salda, Prigorodny District, Verkhnesaldinsky District, Verkhnyaya Salda
The constituency was centred on a major industrial city Nizhny Tagil and covered surrounding areas in western Sverdlovsk Oblast, including industrial towns Kirovgrad, Nizhnyaya Salda and Verkhnyaya Salda.

1995–2007: Kirovgrad, Nevyansky District, Nizhny Tagil, Novouralsk, Prigorodny District, Verkh-Neyvinsky, Verkhny Tagil
The constituency was significantly altered following the 1995 redistricting, losing Nizhnyaya Salda and Verkhnyaya Salda to Artyomovsky constituency in exchange for Nevyansk and Nevyansky District.

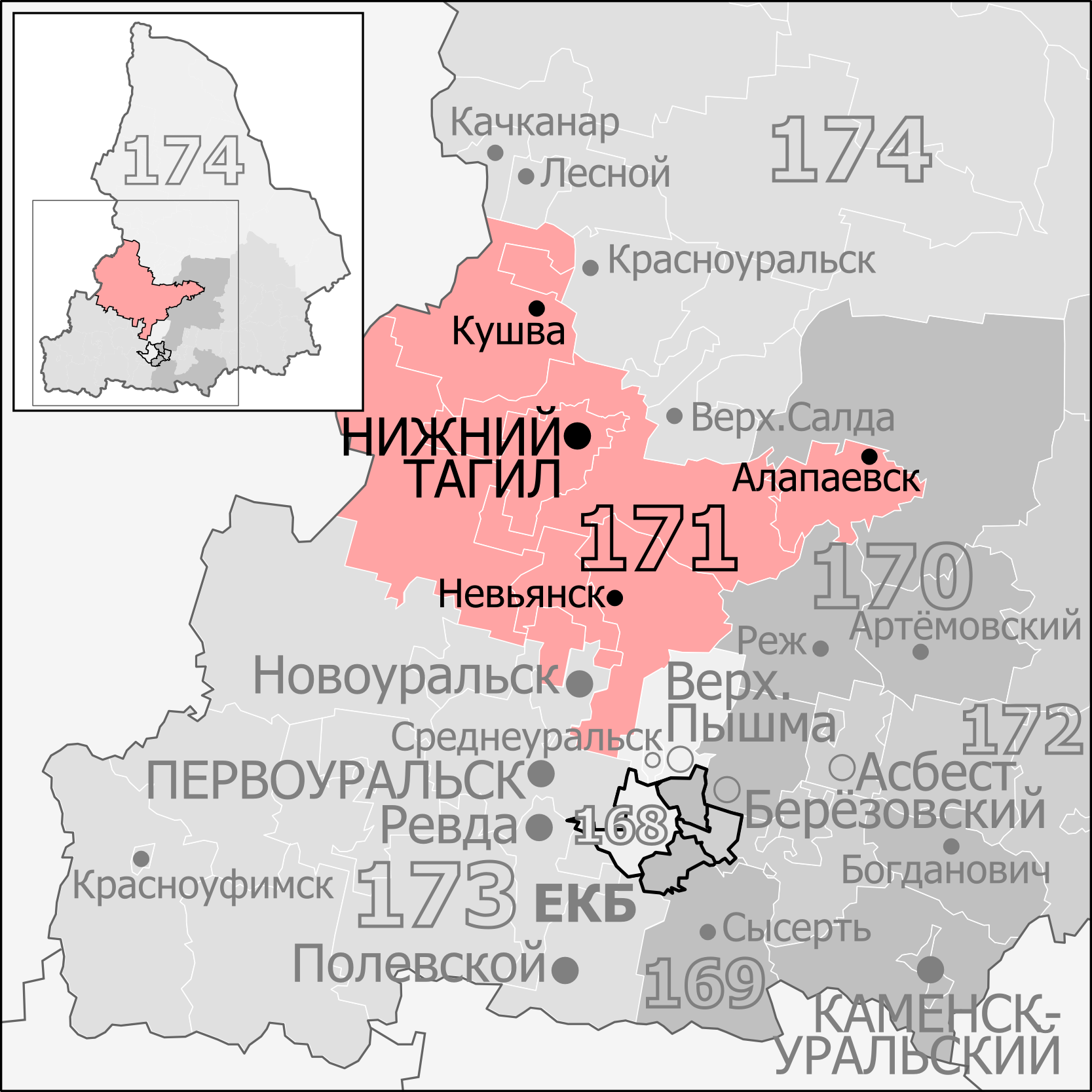
Constituency boundaries from 2016 to 2026

2016–2026: Alapayevsk, Gornouralsky, Kirovgrad, Kushva, Nevyansky District, Nizhny Tagil, Verkh-Neyvinsky, Verkhny Tagil, Verkhnyaya Tura
The constituency was re-created for the 2016 election and retained mots of its former territory, losing only closed city Novouralsk to Pervouralsk constituency. This seat instead gained Kushva and Verkhnyaya Tura to its north from Serov constituency as well as Alapayevsk to its east from the former Artyomovsky constituency.

2026–present: Gornouralsky, Kirovgrad, Kushva, Nevyansky District, Nizhny Tagil, Sredneuralsk, Svobodny, Verkhnyaya Pyshma, Verkhnyaya Tura
After the 2025 redistricting the constituency was significantly changed, swapping Alapayevsk for closed city Svobodny with Serov constituency as well as losing Verkhny Tagil and Verkh-Neyvinsky to Pervouralsk constituency. This seat also gained industrial satellite cities Sredneuralsk and Verkhnyaya Pyshma north of Yekaterinburg from Sverdlovsk constituency.

== Members elected ==
Election	Member	Party
1993	Artur Veyer	Independent
1995	Anatoly Kotkov	Transformation of the Fatherland
1999	Valery Yazev	Our Home – Russia
2003	Valery Yazev	United Russia
2007	Proportional representation - no election by constituency	
2011	Proportional representation - no election by constituency	
2016	Aleksey Balyberdin	United Russia
2021	Konstantin Zakharov	United Russia
2026	Aleksey Svalov	United Russia

== Election results ==
=== 1993 ===
Summary of the 12 December 1993 Russian legislative election in the Nizhny Tagil constituency
Candidate	Party	Votes	%
Artur Veyer	Independent	54,905	22.50%
Anatoly Kotkov	Democratic Party	–	20.91%
Gennady Kutsenok	Russian Democratic Reform Movement	–	–
Vladimir Popov	Choice of Russia	–	–
Total		244,016	100%

=== 1995 ===
Summary of the 17 December 1995 Russian legislative election in the Nizhny Tagil constituency
Candidate	Party	Votes	%
Anatoly Kotkov	Transformation of the Fatherland	42,810	17.01%
Artur Veyer (incumbent)	Ivan Rybkin Bloc	40,623	16.14%
Irina Kungurtseva	Communist Party	28,529	11.33%
Fyodor Dudkin	Independent	27,461	10.91%
Rudolf Chernikov	Independent	25,775	10.24%
Leonid Merzlyakov	Liberal Democratic Party	24,494	9.73%
Igor Rukachev	Forward, Russia!	15,716	6.24%
against all		39,741	15.79%
Total		251,730	100%

=== 1999 ===
Summary of the 19 December 1999 Russian legislative election in the Nizhny Tagil constituency
Candidate	Party	Votes	%
Valery Yazev	Our Home – Russia	118,872	46.41%
Anatoly Kotkov (incumbent)	Independent	22,714	8.87%
Sergey Potapov	Peace, Labour, May	20,334	7.94%
Sergey Belousov	Independent	18,544	7.24%
Nina Titova	Liberal Democratic Party	18,411	7.19%
Artur Veyer	Independent	10,337	4.04%
Gennady Kazakov	Independent	6,020	2.35%
against all		35,374	13.81%
Total		256,160	100%

=== 2003 ===
Summary of the 7 December 2003 Russian legislative election in the Nizhny Tagil constituency
Candidate	Party	Votes	%
Valery Yazev (incumbent)	United Russia	126,970	56.60%
Aleksey Bagaryakov	Union of Right Forces	41,070	18.31%
Yevgeny Goltsev	Liberal Democratic Party	10,232	4.56%
Sergey Smolyakov	Independent	5,877	2.62%
Aleksandr Tarasov	United Russian Party Rus'	1,996	0.89%
against all		33,827	15.08%
Total		224,393	100%

=== 2016 ===
Summary of the 18 September 2016 Russian legislative election in the Nizhny Tagil constituency
Candidate	Party	Votes	%
Aleksey Balyberdin	United Russia	81,111	42.05%
Aleksandr Burkov	A Just Russia	43,594	22.60%
Vladislav Potanin	Communist Party	20,323	10.54%
Ildar Rainbakov	Liberal Democratic Party	16,706	8.66%
Dmitry Abramov	Communists of Russia	7,807	4.05%
Sergey Lyuft	Party of Growth	3,974	2.06%
Mikhail Brovin	People's Freedom Party	3,017	1.56%
Yevgeny Vasilyuk	The Greens	2,572	1.33%
Salaudin Mamakov	Rodina	1,653	0.86%
Dmitry Panachev	Patriots of Russia	1,614	0.84%
Total		192,884	100%

=== 2021 ===
Summary of the 17-19 September 2021 Russian legislative election in the Nizhny Tagil constituency
Candidate	Party	Votes	%
Konstantin Zakharov	United Russia	67,711	31.75%
Mikhail Boyarkin	Communist Party	48,386	22.69%
Sergey Belousov	A Just Russia — For Truth	35,252	16.53%
Maria Barantseva	New People	18,446	8.65%
Anton Gusev	Liberal Democratic Party	15,149	7.10%
Ivan Morozov	Rodina	4,937	2.31%
Pavel Khoroshilov	Yabloko	4,471	2.10%
Anton Myatovich	Russian Party of Freedom and Justice	3,811	1.79%
Total		213,285	100%

=== 2026 ===
Summary of the 18-20 September 2026 Russian legislative election in the Nizhny Tagil constituency
Candidate	Party	Votes	%
Aleksey Svalov	United Russia	93,574	40.60%
Mikhail Boyarkin	Communist Party	52,304	22.69%
Sergey Kozin	A Just Russia	23,801	10.33%
Natalya Grekhova	Liberal Democratic Party	21,500	9.33%
Dmitry Dymshakov	New People	18,401	7.98%
Tatyana Gorshkaleva	Yabloko	12,000	5.21%
Total		230,470	100%
