= Nevyansk Mechanical Plant =

- Founded: 1701
- Founder: Nikita Demidov
- Headquarters: Nevyansk, Russia
- Website: nmz-group.ru

Nevyansk Mechanical Plant (Russian: Невьянский машиностроительный завод) is a company based in Nevyansk, Russia and established in 1701.

The Nevyansk Mechanical Plant, one of the older plants in the Yekaterinburg area, produced artillery shells and aircraft bombs for the military. During World War II, it produced a peak of a million howitzer shells a month, or 50 percent of the Red Army's needs. Today it produces industrial equipment, including presses of various kinds, and domestic fixtures such as furnaces, electric stove burners, and waffle irons. The plant reportedly ended all its military production during 1992.
