= Gornouralsky =

Gornouralsky (masculine), Gornouralskaya (feminine), or Gornouralskoye (neuter) may refer to:

- Gornouralsky Urban Okrug, the municipal formation in Sverdlovsk Oblast, Russia, which Prigorodny District of that oblast is incorporated as
- Gornouralsky (urban locality), an urban locality (a work settlement) in Sverdlovsk Oblast, Russia
