= Leaning Tower of Nevyansk =

Tower in Sverdlovsk Oblast, Russia

Coordinates: 57°29′22″N 60°13′15″E

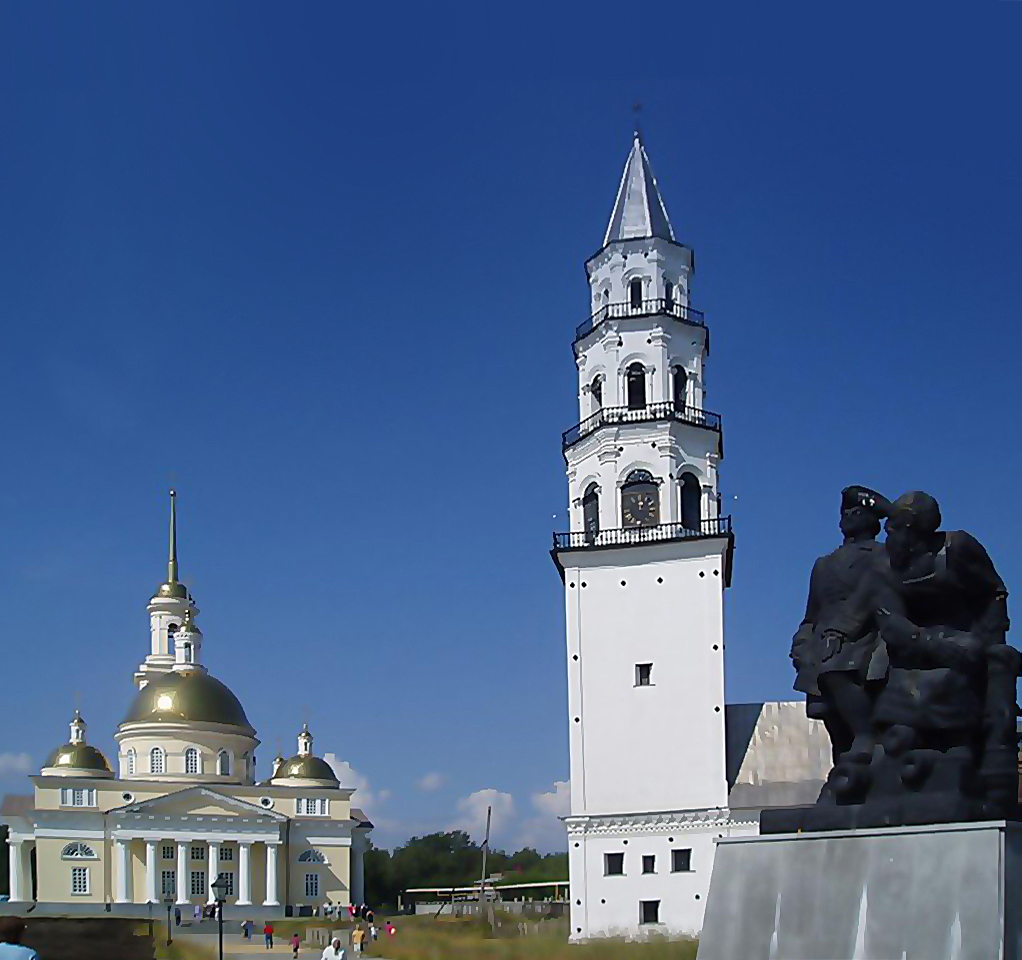
The center of Nevyansk (viewer's left to viewer's right): Old Believers' church (domed), the Leaning Tower (white spire), and the monument to Peter I of Russia and Nikita Demidov (cast metal figures)

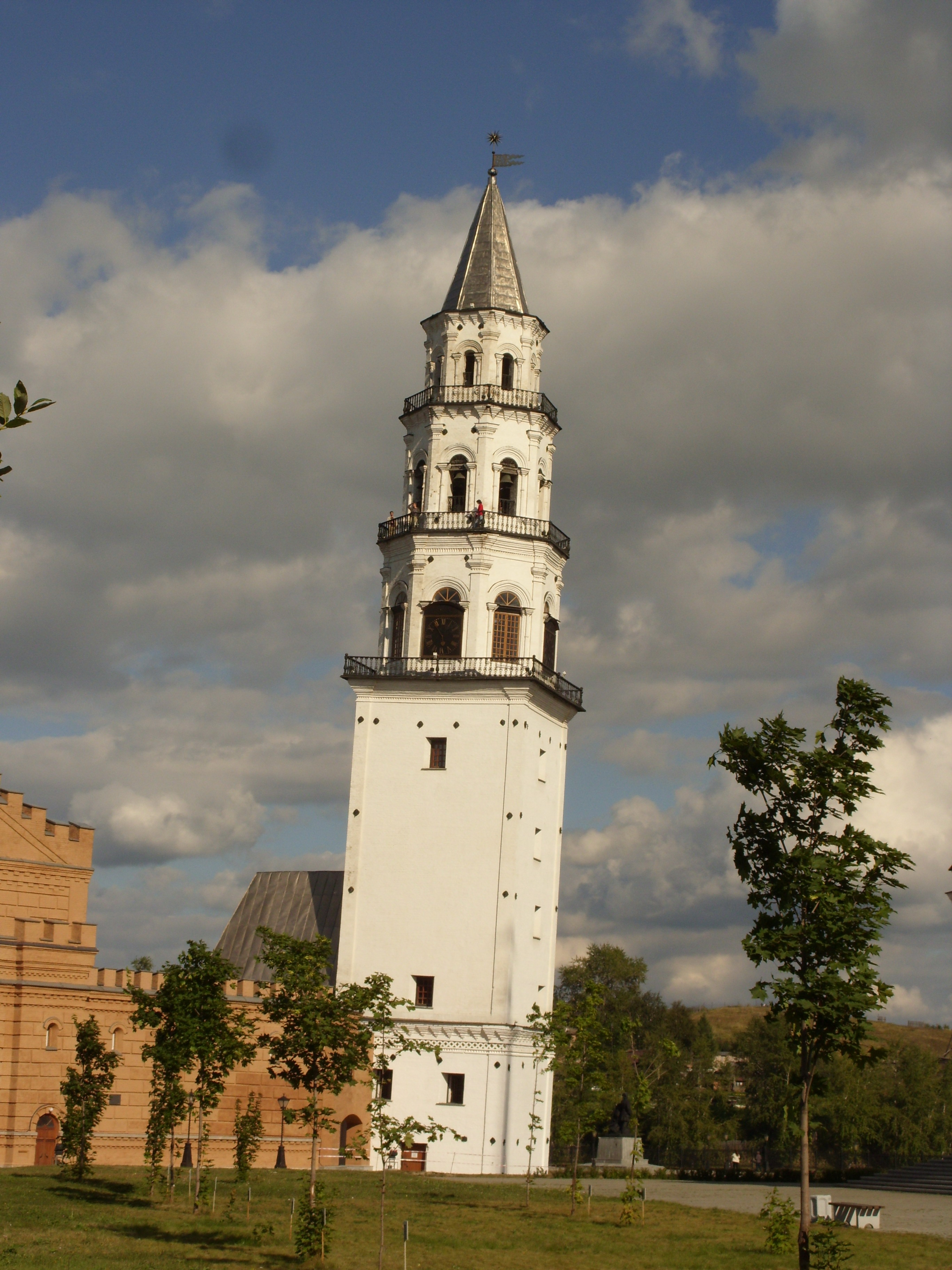
View from the north

The Leaning Tower of Nevyansk (Russian: Невья́нская ба́шня) is a tower built in the 18th century located within the town of Nevyansk, Sverdlovsk Oblast, Russia. The construction was funded by the blacksmith and industrialist Nikita Demidov and later his son Akinfiy Demidov, a famous Russian manufacturer and associate of Peter I. However, the architect is not presently known.

The height of the tower is 57.5 metres (189 ft), while its base is 9.5 metres (31 ft) wide. The deviation from the vertical of the top part of the tower is approximately 3 degrees. The exact date of construction is unknown, but Russian historians believe that it was built between 1721 and 1745. The tower is prominently featured within the town's flag and coat of arms.

Following the restoration, the Nevyansk Tower was opened to the public. Guided tours are provided by a local museum and tourist guides from Yekaterinburg.

== Technical parameters ==
- The base is a square with sides of 9.5 metres.
- Vertical deviation of the tower is about 1.85 metres.
- Secular sediment is 0.9 millimetres per year.
- The height is 57.5 metres.
- The thickness of the walls is 2 metres at the base, 32 centimetres at the top level.
- The weathercock weighs 25 kilograms and is 178 centimetres long.
- The diameter of the ball-lightning rod is 30 centimetres; the length of the spike-ray is 40 centimetres.
- The musical chime has 10 copper bells and 1 bronze bell weighing more than a ton.

== Purpose ==
Historians still debate the built purpose of the Nevyansk Tower. It was likely meant to embody the might of the Demidov family and serve as an architectural symbol of their dynasty. It has been suggested that it was also used as a "bank safe", a watchtower, a belltower, prison, or a laboratory for conducting chemical experiments and producing counterfeit money.

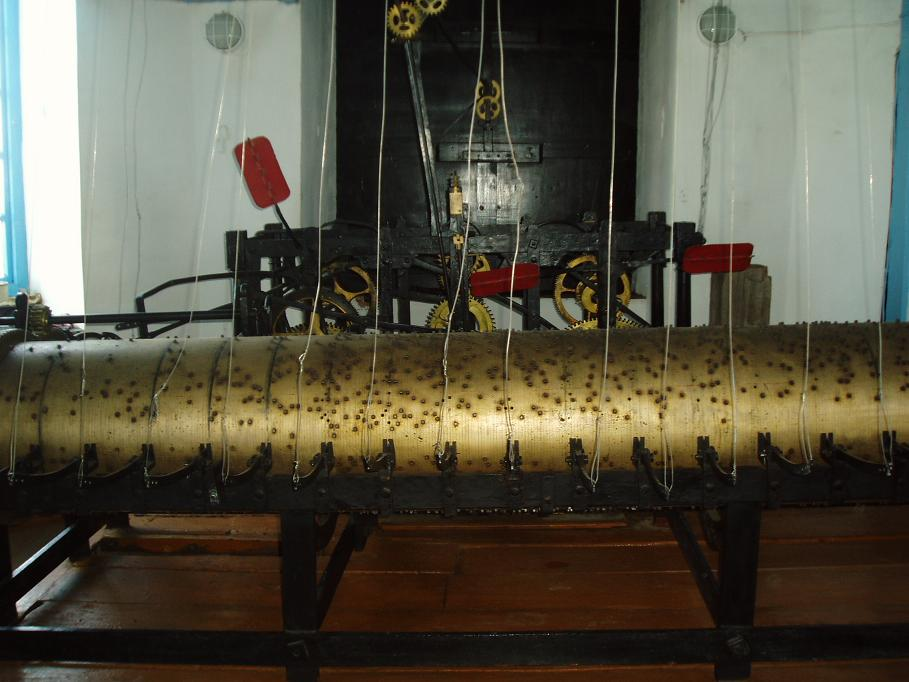
The bell-playing musical clockwork produced by Richard Phelps

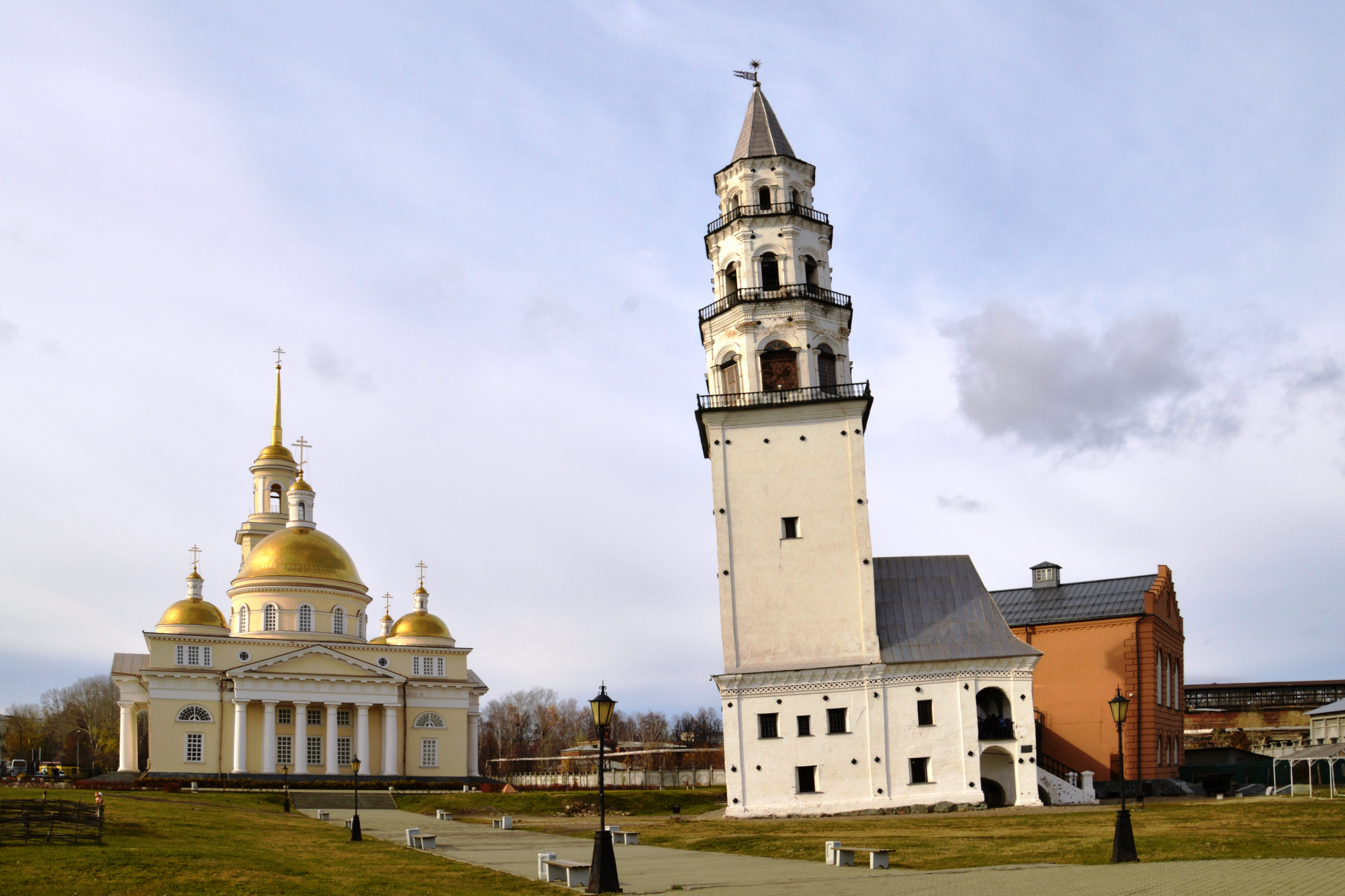
View from the south-east

During restoration work, archaeologists were able to determine the purpose of some of the rooms. The second floor may have been Demidov's office, where he kept his archives and other papers. The third floor housed a laboratory, equipped with a furnace. A soot sample taken from the flue showed traces of silver and gold, which some consider might relate to a theory, later refuted by scientists, that the Demidovs may have been conducting coin minting activity there. The tower could have been used for smelting the top layers of ore-bearing deposits, which often contain silver or gold. Floors four to six have only stairwells. The seventh and the eight floors house a clock that plays music on a carillon made by the English master Richard Phelps in 1730.

It is said that the clock was purchased by Demidov for 5,000 rubles, a considerable amount for that time. To compare, the construction of the Nevyansk Tower itself costed 4,207 rubles. The clock has three dials, ten music bells, weighing about four tons, and one alarm bell. The ninth floor was believed to be used as an observation post.

The purpose of one particular room in the tower is still debated. Archaeologists dubbed it the "acoustic room." It measures 20 square metres (220 sq ft) and is located between the fourth and the fifth floors. A person standing in one corner of this room can whisper words to another person in the opposite corner and they will be readily audible. Researchers do not know whether the room was built this way on purpose or not. It is possible that Demidov used this acoustic room for gathering intelligence on his high-ranking guests.

== Inclination of the tower ==
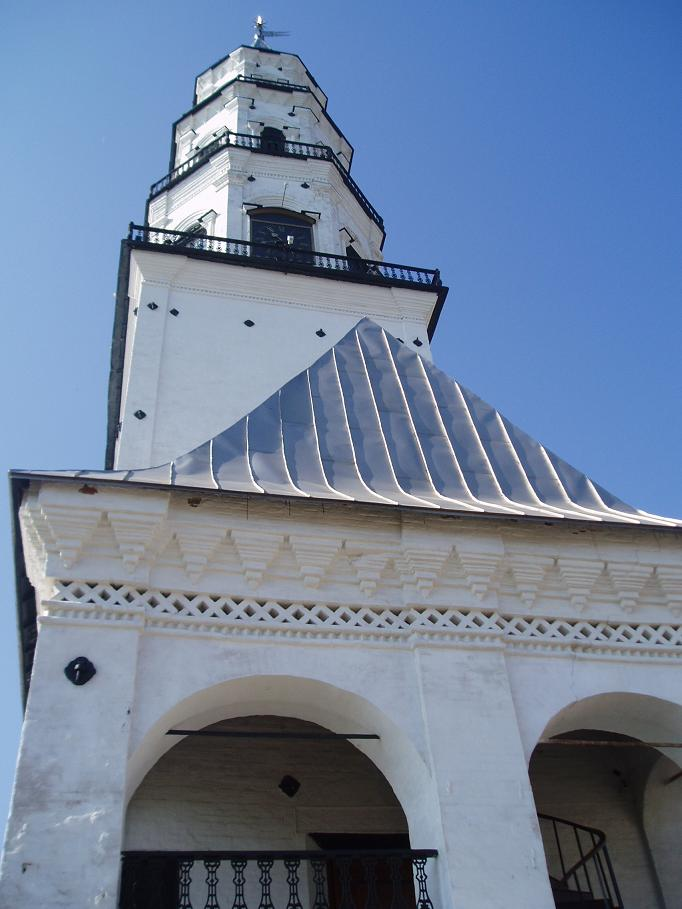
A view of the tower from the ground

The reason of the tower's inclination is inconclusive. Some historians claim that the tower was purposely inclined to face southwest in the direction of Demidov's birthplace in Tula. Another legend claims that once the construction of the tower had been completed, Akinfiy Demidov and the unknown architect went on top of the tower where Demidov asked him whether he could build anything better than the Nevyansk Tower. The architect agreed, and Demidov ordered him thrown from the top of the building; a similar legend is attached to the construction of the Prague Astronomical Clock. The next morning, the locals supposedly noticed that the tower had leaned forward a bit and water had started trickling down the walls. One can see water constantly dripping down the southwest wall of the tower to this day (albeit as a result of a natural phenomenon).

The restorers say that there is no evidence to assume that the Nevyansk Tower was purposely built inclined. The current surveying data shows that the defect had to be obvious during the construction. It appears that drifting grounds were to blame for the inclination of the tower from the very beginning. Scientists believe that an uneven subsidence took place when the tower had already been partially built. Most likely, the construction workers stopped building the tower on seeing the defect, but later on they decided to go on with their work. This is supported by the color of mortar between the bricks, the composition of which changed as the builders worked their way up. Specially trimmed bricks were used to even out the tower. Current measurements indicate that there is a 3-degree deviation of the bases' tower from its axis, while the middle part is partially straightened as the inclination equals only one degree. The top part of the tower stands vertically.

== Construction techniques ==
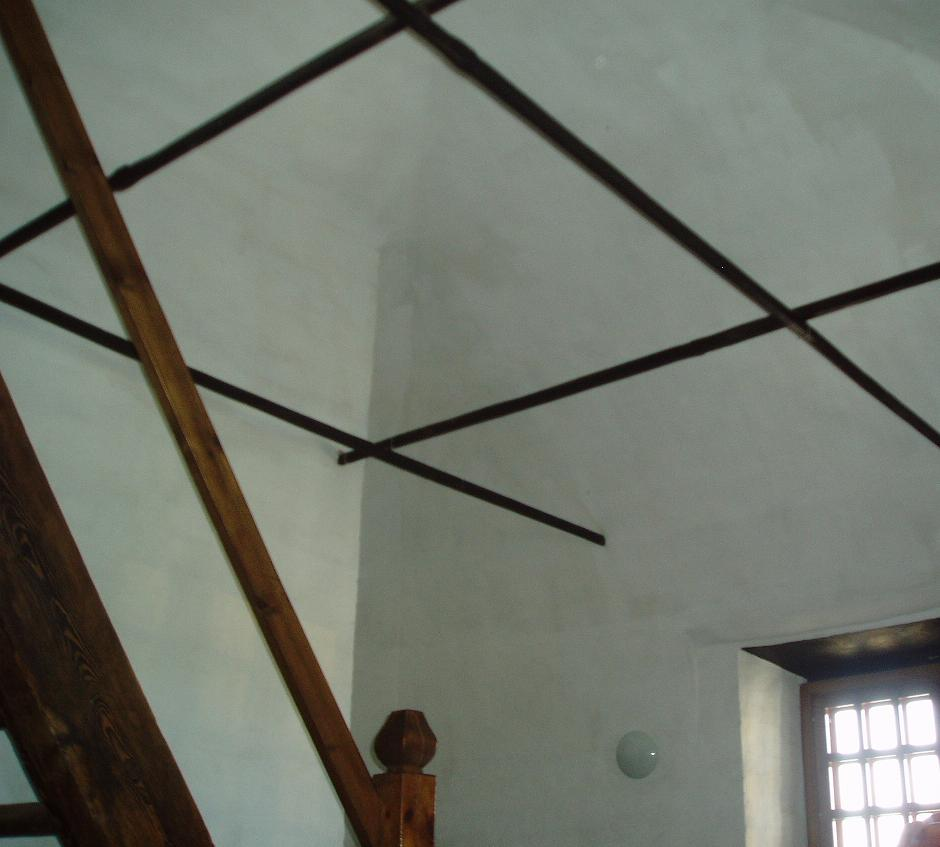
A corner of the acoustic room, with some rebars of the tower seen

The brick used for the construction of the tower was made from fired clay that incorporated the colors of lime and egg white, the tower's tented roof was the first cast iron cupola in the world, consisting of a metal carcass and outer shell. The second time this technique was applied, about 100 years later, was during the reconstruction of the Mainz Cathedral in Germany in 1826, and the third time it was used in the dome of Saint Isaac's Cathedral in St. Petersburg, built in the 1840s.

The top of the tower is crowned with a gilded sphere with spikes, built somewhere between 1721 and 1745. These were recently interpreted as lightning rods (existing 28 years before Benjamin Franklin's scientific explanation of such devices).

The structural parts of the tower were reinforced with wrought iron bars as well as cast iron elements.

== See also ==
- List of leaning towers

== Sources ==
- Most of the article was translated from the original Russian text in the Itogi Weekly magazine
- Additional material was translated from the Russian text at http://7.ural.ru
- Additional information and photos of Nevyansk tower
