= Zaretsky =

Zaretsky is a surname. Notable people with the surname include:

- Alexandra Zaretsky (born 1987), Israeli ice dancer
- Adrian Parr Zaretsky, Australian-born philosopher and cultural critic
- Roman Zaretsky (born 1983), Israeli ice dancer, brother of Alexandra

== See also ==
- Zaritsky
- Zaretsky, a fictional character in Pushkin's Eugene Onegin
- Nicholas-Zaretsky Church, church in Tula, Russia
