= Nevyansky =

Nevyansky (masculine), Nevyanskaya (feminine), or Nevyanskoye (neuter) may refer to:

- Nevyansky District, a district of Sverdlovsk Oblast
  - Nevyansky Urban Okrug, the municipal formation which this district is incorporated as
- Nevyanskoye, a rural locality (a selo) in Sverdlovsk Oblast
