= Konstantin Zakharov (politician) =

Russian politician

- Константин Захаров
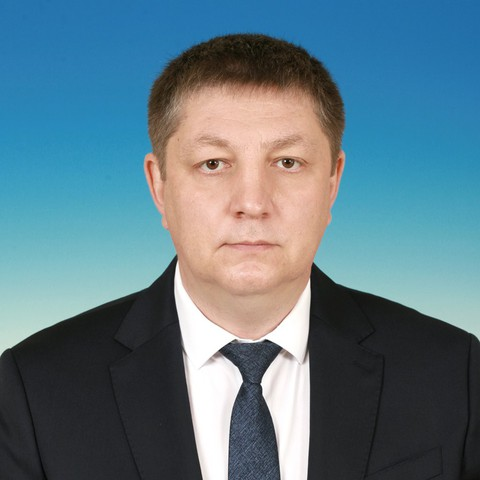
- official portrait, circa 2021

Member of the State Duma for Sverdlovsk Oblast
- Incumbent
- Assumed office 12 October 2021
- Preceded by: Aleksey Balyberdin
- Constituency: Nizhny Tagil (No. 171)

Personal details
- Born: 31 March 1973 (age 53) Nizhny Tagil, RSFSR, USSR
- Party: United Russia
- Education: Nizhny Tagil Engineering College; Ural State University of Railway Transport; Ural Academy of Public Administration

Konstantin Yurievich Zakharov (Russian: Константин Юрьевич Захаров; born 31 March 1973) is a Russian political figure and a deputy of the 8th State Duma.

From 1992 to 1995, Zakharov worked as a repairman to maintain ventilation and air conditioning systems at Uralvagonzavod. In 1999, he headed a youth organization of the Uralvagonzavod and became assistant to the general director of the enterprise for work with youth. From 2004 to 2012, Zakharov was the deputy of the Nizhny Tagil City Duma. From 2005 to 2009, he was the Deputy General Director for Marketing and Sales of the Uralvagonzavod. In 2010, he became the CEO of the Verkhnyaya Salda Metallurgical Plant. In 2011, he was appointed the head of the administration of the Leninsky district of Nizhny Tagil. From 2012 to 2017, he was the Deputy head of Nizhny Tagil. Since September 2021, he has served as deputy of the 8th State Duma.

== Sanctions ==
He was sanctioned by the UK government on 11 March 2022 in relation to the Russo-Ukrainian War.
