= Galina Kurlyandskaya =

Russian physicist

- Born: 30 January 1961 (age 65)
- Citizenship: Russia
- Education: Ural State University
- Scientific career
- Fields: Physics of magnetism and magnetic materials
- Workplaces: Ural State University, University of the Basque Country

Galina Vladimirovna Kurlyandskaya (Russian: Галина Владимировна Курляндская; born 30 January 1961) is a Russian physicist, known for her works on giant magnetoimpedance.

== Biography ==
Galina Kurlyandskaya was born in Kirovgrad, Soviet Union, in 1961 in a Russian family.

== Career ==
Kurlyandskaya has published more than 110 peer-reviewed research papers, on topics like design, development, processing and characterization of functional materials, nanostructures, biomaterials, magnetic markers, nanocomponent containing devices, and fabrication of miniature sensor prototypes including fluid containing detectors and imprint circuit units, and microscopy.

Kurlyandskaya is a member of the editorial board of Sensor Letters journal (American Scientific Publishers, a company identified as a predatory publisher on Beall's List.)

== Selected publications ==
- Kurlyandskaya G.V. and Cerdeira M.A. Giant magnetoimpedance for biosensing, in: Encyclopedia of Nanoscience and Nanotechnology, 2nd Edition, American Scientific Publishers, 2010.
- Vas´kovskiy V.O., Svalov, A.V., Kurlyandskaya G.V. Rare Earth/Transition Metal nanoscale multilayers, in: Encyclopedia of Nanoscience and Nanotechnology, 2nd Edition, American Scientific Publishers, 2010.
- Kurlyandskaya G.V. and Cerdeira M.A. Magnetic nanoparticles as a material for magnetic markers in biology and medicine, in: Magnetism of Rare Earth and 3d- Transition Metals Based Nanosystems / Ed. by. V.O. Vas´kovskiy, Editorial of Ural State University Ekaterinburg, 2008.
- García J.A., Saad A., Elbaile L., Kurlyandskaya G.V. Surface Magnetic Properties and Magnetoimpedance, in: Metallic Glasses for New Sensor Applications, Nova Science Publishers, Progress in Nanotechnology Research, 2006, p. 1-42.
- Kurlyandskaya G.V. Giant Magnetoimpedance for sensor applications, in: Encyclopedia of Sensors, American Scientific Publishers, 2006, p. 205-237.
- Hernando B., Gorria P., Sánchez M.L., Prida V.M., Kurlyandskaya G.V. Magnetoimpedance in nancrystalline alloys, in: Encyclopedia of Nanoscience and Nanotechnology, American Scientific Publishers, v.4, 2004, p. 949-966.
- Kumar A., Mohapatra S., Fal-Miyar V., Cerdeira A., Garcia J.A., Srikanth H., Gass J., Kurlyandskaya G.V. Magnetoimpedance biosensor for Fe3O4 nanoparticle intracellular uptake evaluation, Appl. Phys. Lett. v.91, N14, 2007, p. 143902-3.
- Kurlyandskaya G.V., Cunanan J., Bhagat S.M., Aphesteguy J.C., Jacobo S.E. (2007): Field-induced microwave absorption in Fe3O4 nanoparticles and Fe3O4/polyaniline composites synthesized by different methods, Journal of Physics and Chemistry of Solids, v.68, N8, p. 1527-1532.
- Jacobo S.E., Aphesteguy J.C., Lopez Anton R., Kurlyandskaya G.V.Structural and magnetic characterization of polyaniline composite films, Material Science Forum, v. 570, 2008, p. 138-143.
- Fal Miyar V., Cerdeira M.A., García J.A., Potatov A.P., Pierna A.R., Marzo F.F., Barandiarán J.M., Kurlyandskaya G.V., Giant Magnetoimpedance of Electrochemically Surface Modified Co-Based Amorphous Ribbons, IEEE Trans. Magn., v. 44 (11), 2008, p. 4476-4479, 2008.
- Kurlyandskaya G., Svalov E. «The Art of Magnetism» — an interdisciplinary summer course, The 2nd International Multi-Conference on Society, Cybernetics and Informatics, July 10–13, 2009 Orlando, Florida, US, 2009. — 294 p.
