= Blagodat (mountain) =

Mountain in Russia

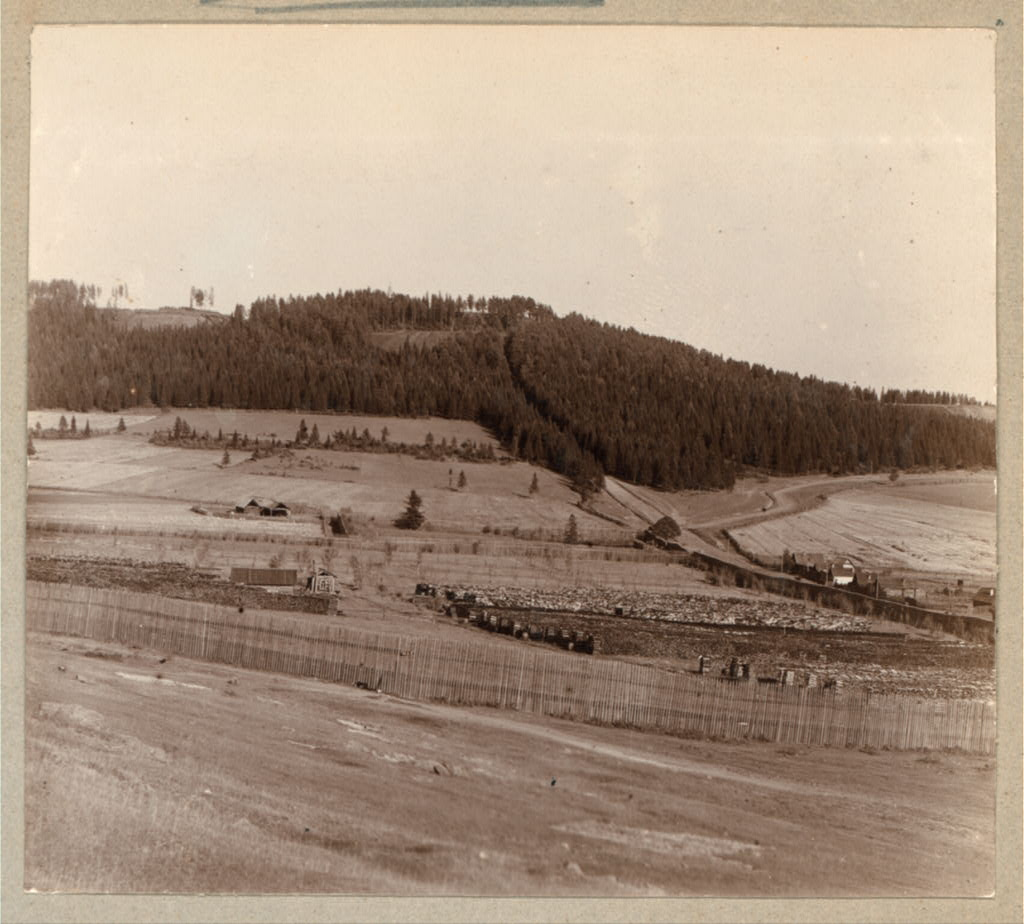
- The mountain in 1910. Photo by Sergey Prokudin-Gorsky.

Highest point
- Elevation: 364 m (1,194 ft)
- Coordinates: 58°17′21″N 59°47′09″E

Geography
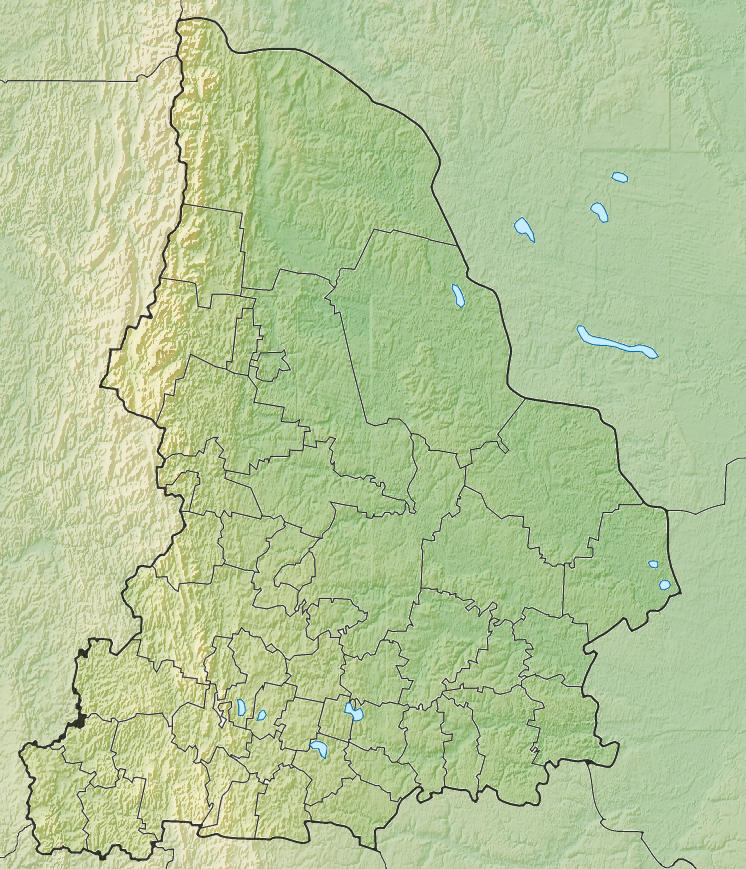
- Location within Sverdlovsk Oblast Location within European Russia
- Country: Russia
- Region: Sverdlovsk Oblast
- Parent range: Ural Mountains

Blagodat (Russian: Благода́ть) is a mountain in Sverdlovsk Oblast in Russia, on the eastern slope of the Ural Mountains within the city limits of Kushva. It became famous due to a large deposit of magnetic ironstone discovered here in 1735.

== Geographical characteristics ==
Blagodat mountain is located on the eastern slope of the Ural Mountains near the town of Kushva in the municipal formation Kushva Urban District in Sverdlovsk Oblast. In the XVIII — early XX centuries it was the world's largest deposit of magnetic ironstone. The Salda river (a tributary of the Tura) originates at the foot of the mountain. On the eastern side of the mountain is the Salda swamp. The length of the mountain from north to south is almost 2.5 kilometres parallel to the Ural ridge, from which Blagodat mountain is 20 kilometres away.

The mountain originally had three peaks. By the early 20th century only one peak remained, on which a chapel in the name of Transfiguration of the Lord and a monument to the discoverer Stepan Chumpin were built. At the beginning of the 20th century, the mountain's height above sea level was 385 metres.

Blagodat belongs to the type of the so-called "iron mountains". The western slope of the mountain, composed of porphyry greenstone rocks, contains no deposits of magnetic ironstone. On the summit and along the eastern slope were numerous deposits of magnetic ironstone in the form of huge irregular drifts and veins. The magnetic ironstone of these veins had a varied structure: it could be dense and fine-grained, scattered as powder, or be in the form of boulders.

== History ==
The magnetic ironstone deposit at Blagodat mountain was discovered by hunter Vogul Stepan Chumpin. In the spring of 1735, he appeared before the mining official Sergei Yartsev and presented several pieces of magnetic ore from the mountain mined on the bank of the Kushva river. In June 1735, the deposit was inspected by a representative of the Ural mining administration, mining engineer E. M. Artsybashev together with surveyor V. Shishkov. Soon this mountain was explored and the largest deposit was discovered there, and the magnetic ore was of very high quality. In September 1735 the mountain was visited by the head of the factories Vasily Nikitich Tatishchev who gave it the name Grace (Russian: Благода́ть) in honour of Empress Anna Ioannovna (Anna is translated from Classical Hebrew as "graceful"). In the autumn of the same year the construction of mining factories began here. The town of Kushva was founded at the same time.

According to the legend, Stepan Chumpin was burned by his tribesmen for giving away the secret of the mountain to the state. To commemorate this, a monument was built on the top of the mountain in 1826 (according to other sources, in 1830). However, the version that Chumpin was actually burned has not been documented.

In 1735, Blagodat was given to general-berg-director Curt Alexander von Schönberg, who undertook to pay the cost of the factory buildings and supplies. Development of the mine progressed vigorously. Schönberg did not pay the promised money, and the mountain together with the factories was taken from him. In 1754, Blagodat was given to Count Peter Ivanovich Shuvalov, who also undertook to pay the debt to the treasury. After his death in 1763 for debts Goroblagodatskie factories and the mountain again went to the treasury from the heir P. I. Shuvalov, his son Count A. P. Shuvalov.

In July 1770, the mountain was examined by Peter Simon Pallas during his expedition. The academician noted the fusibility of the ore of Blagodat mountain and its high iron content.

In 1870, after visiting the Ural factories, the Austrian metallurgist Peter von Tunner noted that "only in two... mountains — Vysokaya and Blagodat and their immediate vicinities, according to the most moderate calculation, there are such reserves of very rich and pure magnetic ironstone, which would last for a thousand years, if more than 40 or 50 million poods of ore were taken out annually. This is an enormous wealth".

In the report on the results of the Ural Expedition in 1899 Dmitri Mendeleev visited the mine. His report pointed out the high level of mining operations at the deposit, as well as the advantages of roasting the ore over smelting to reduce sulphur.

=== Development of the deposit ===
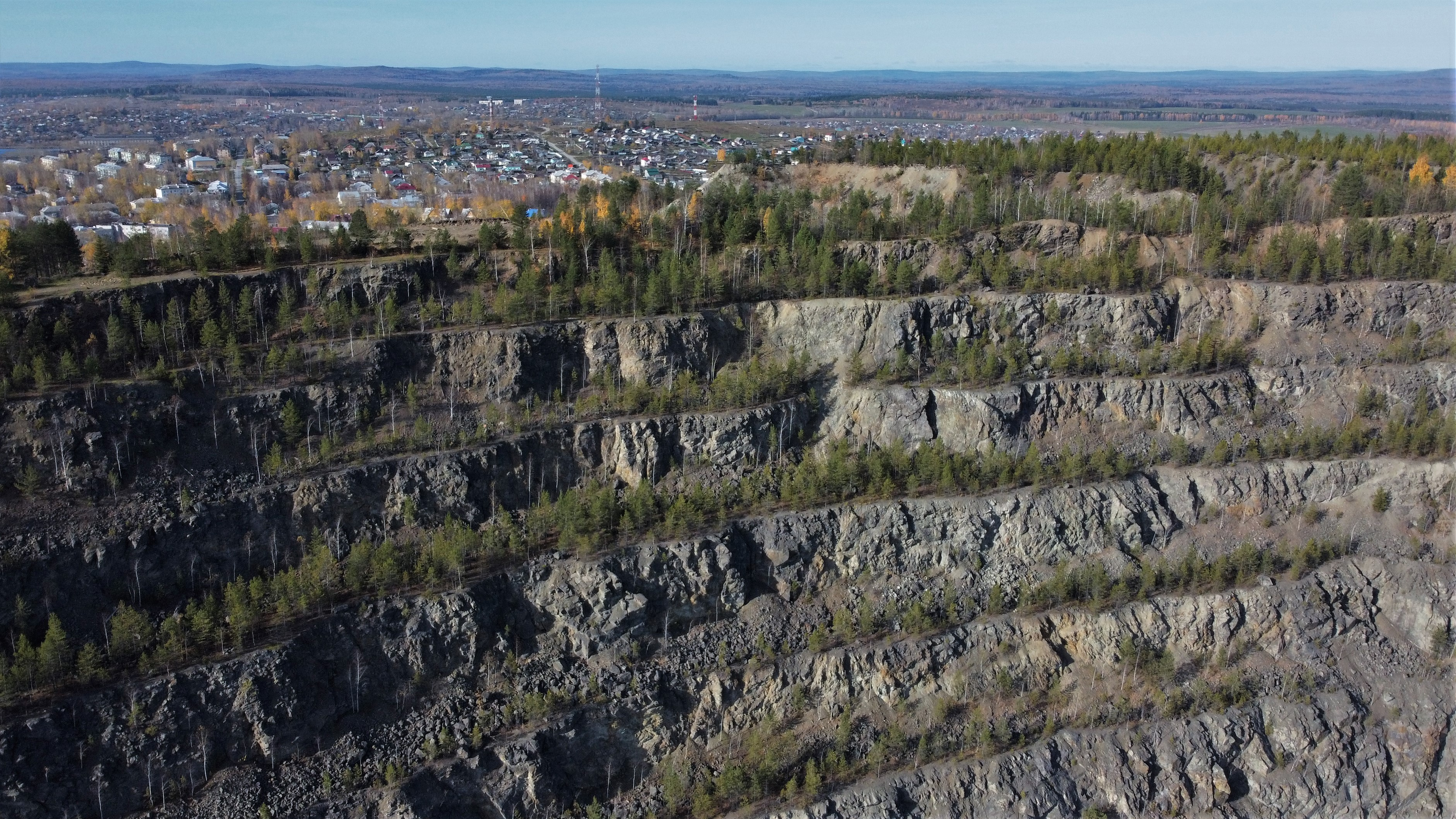
Goroblagodatskaya mine-8

Development of the deposit began from the surface due to the higher (up to 58%) iron content of the ore. The metal smelted from Goroblagodat ore was of high quality due to natural impurities of chromium, titanium and manganese in the ore. In the period from the 1730s to the 1830s, the Goroblagodatskoye ore management produced 1.2 million tonnes of ore at a production cost of 3-4 kopecks per pood.

By the early 2000s, total production at the deposit reached 150 million tonnes of ore. By that time, the average iron content in the mined ore was about 30%.

In 2003, the mine was closed because the deposit was almost completely depleted. Now the central part is replaced by an open pit about a kilometre in diameter and up to 315 metres deep. The closure of the city-forming mine had a negative impact on the economy of Kushva.

== Attractions ==
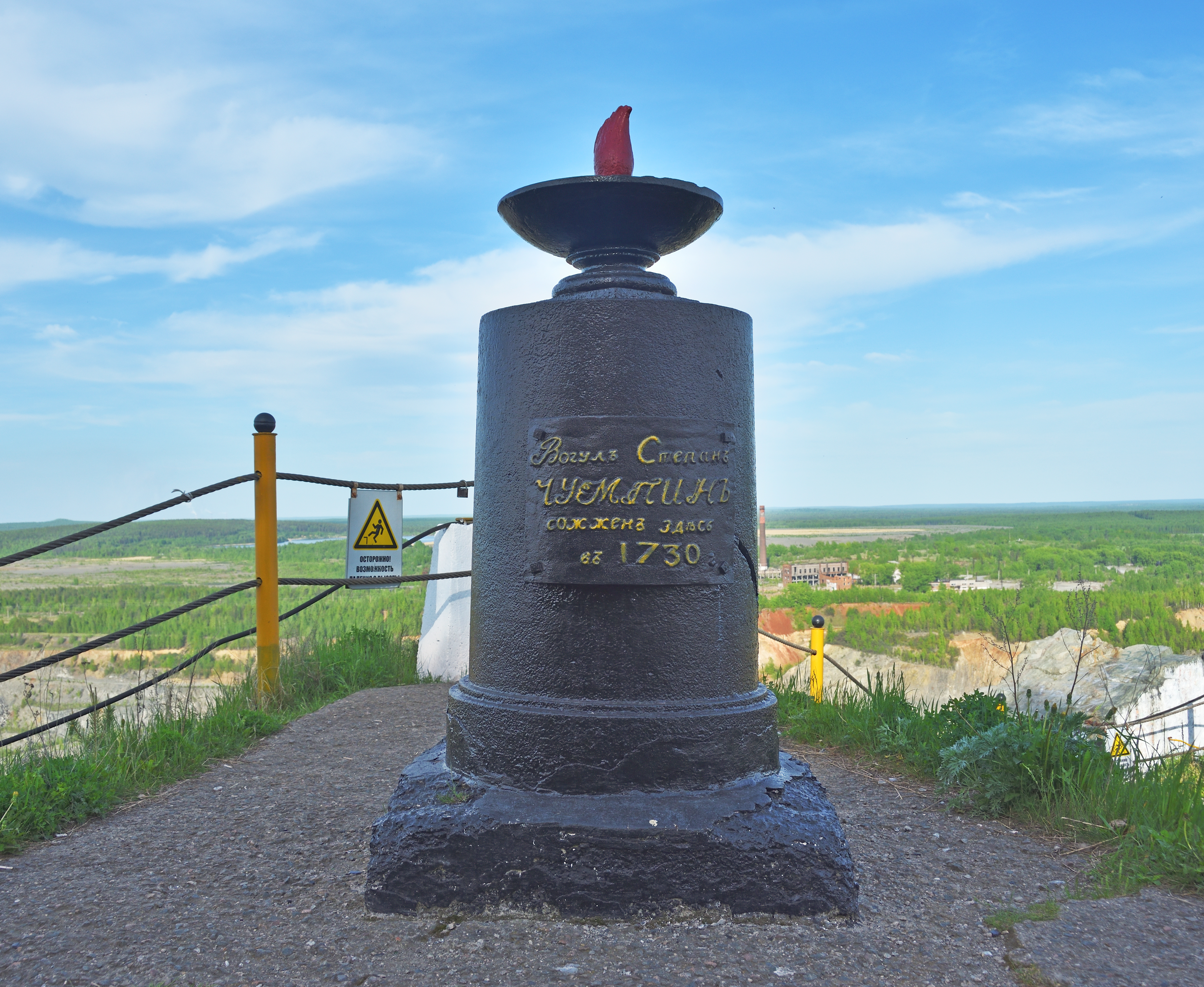
Kushva, Chumpin Memorial (1884)

=== Monument to Stepan Chumpin ===
A monument dedicated to the discoverer of the deposit, Stepan Chumpin, was built on the summit of Blagodat mountain in 1826. In the 20th century the monument was moved to a new location at the edge of the quarry. The monument is a cast iron pillar surmounted with a metal bowl containing metal tongues of flame. The inscription on the monument reads: "Vogul Stepan Chumpin was burnt here in 1730". This fact of the Vogul burning is disputed by historians.

=== The Chapel of the Transfiguration of the Lord (not preserved) ===
The chapel consecrated in the name of Transfiguration of the Lord was located on the top of Mount Grace. It stood on a wooden platform set on a cone-shaped pyramid made of magnetic ironstone. Every year on the feast of the Transfiguration of the Lord, a procession was made to the chapel. The chapel was demolished in the 20th century.

== Mount Blagodatya in culture ==
- Pavel Bazhov wrote about Blagodat mountain in his story "About the Chief Thief" (Russian: «Про главного вора»):

"And in those years, the biggest talk was about Blagodat mountain. A hunter, they say, brought pebbles from this mountain to our town and showed them to the mountain authorities. Those saw — the iron ore of the highest grade, and they quickly hired knowledgeable people to look at the place. It turned out — the whole mountain is made of solid ore."

- In 1890, this peak was depicted in a painting by the artist Apollinary Mikhaylovich Vasnetsov. In 1910, photographer Sergey Prokudin-Gorsky captured Blagodat mountain in several images.
- The full legend about Stepan and Blagodat mountain is told in E. A. Permyak's story "Byl-nebyl-nebyl about the Iron Mountain" (Russian: «Быль-небыль про Железную гору»). The author also relays the fact that the protagonist was burned by his tribesmen — but as revenge for the desecrated pagan shrines.
- In the novel Word and Deed (Russian: «Слово и дело») by Valentin Pikul, a part of the action develops around Blagodat mountain.

== Gallery ==
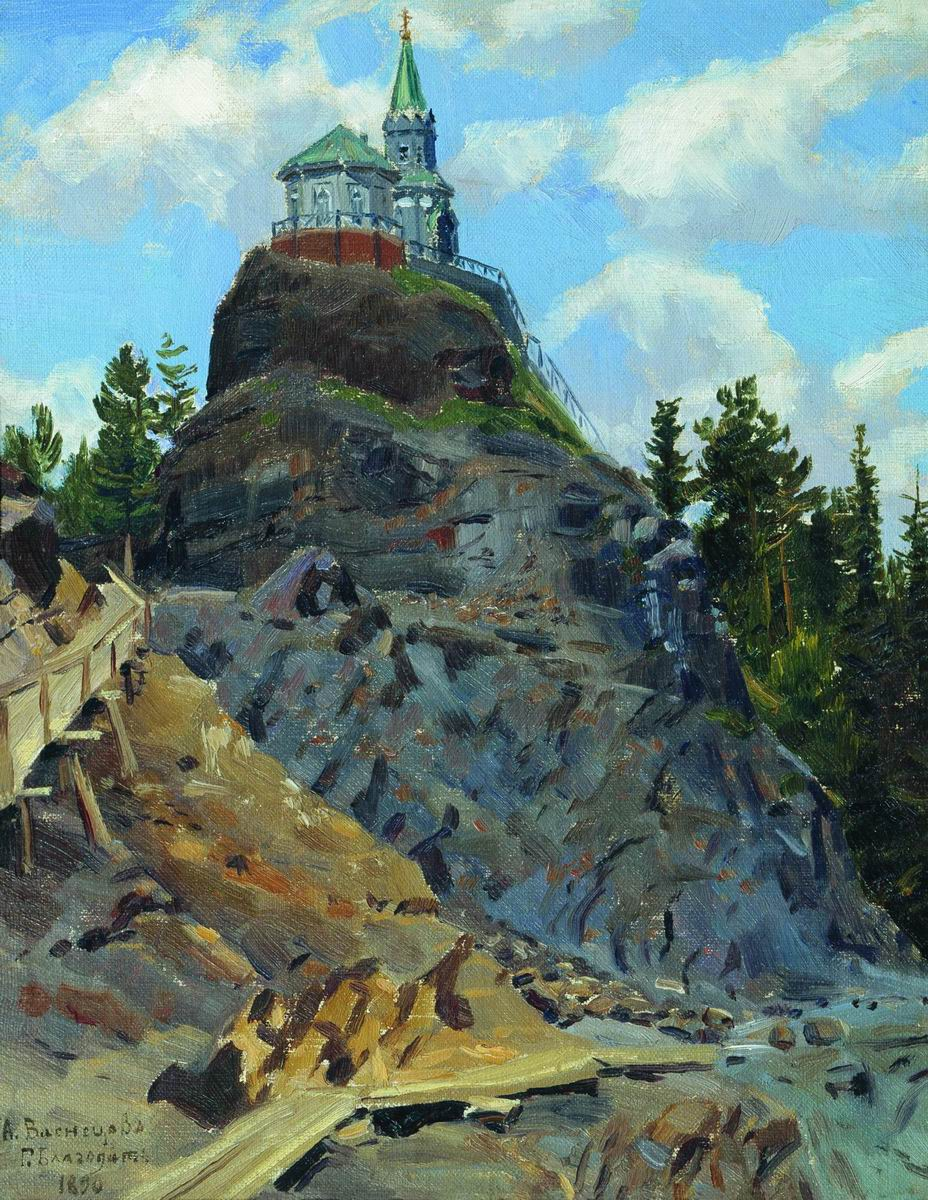
А. M. Vasnetsov. Blagodat mountain. 1890.

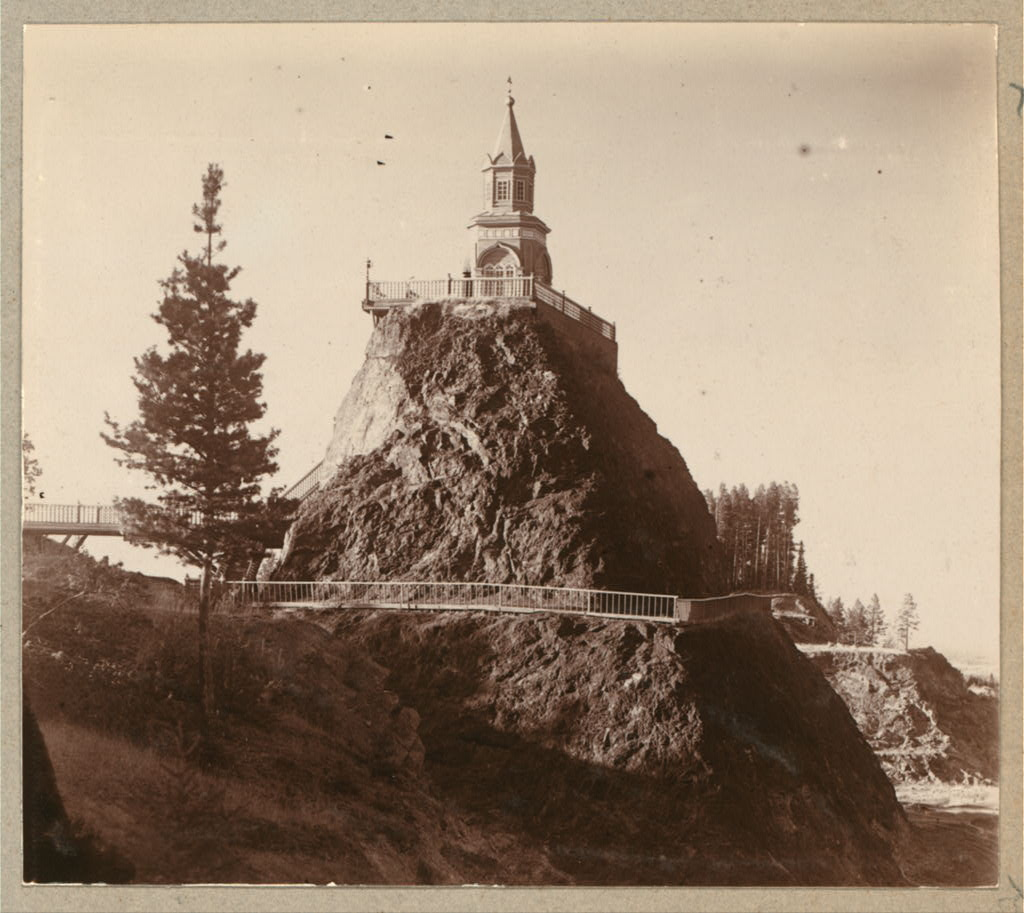
The chapel at the top of the mountain in 1910. Photo by Sergey Prokudin-Gorsky.

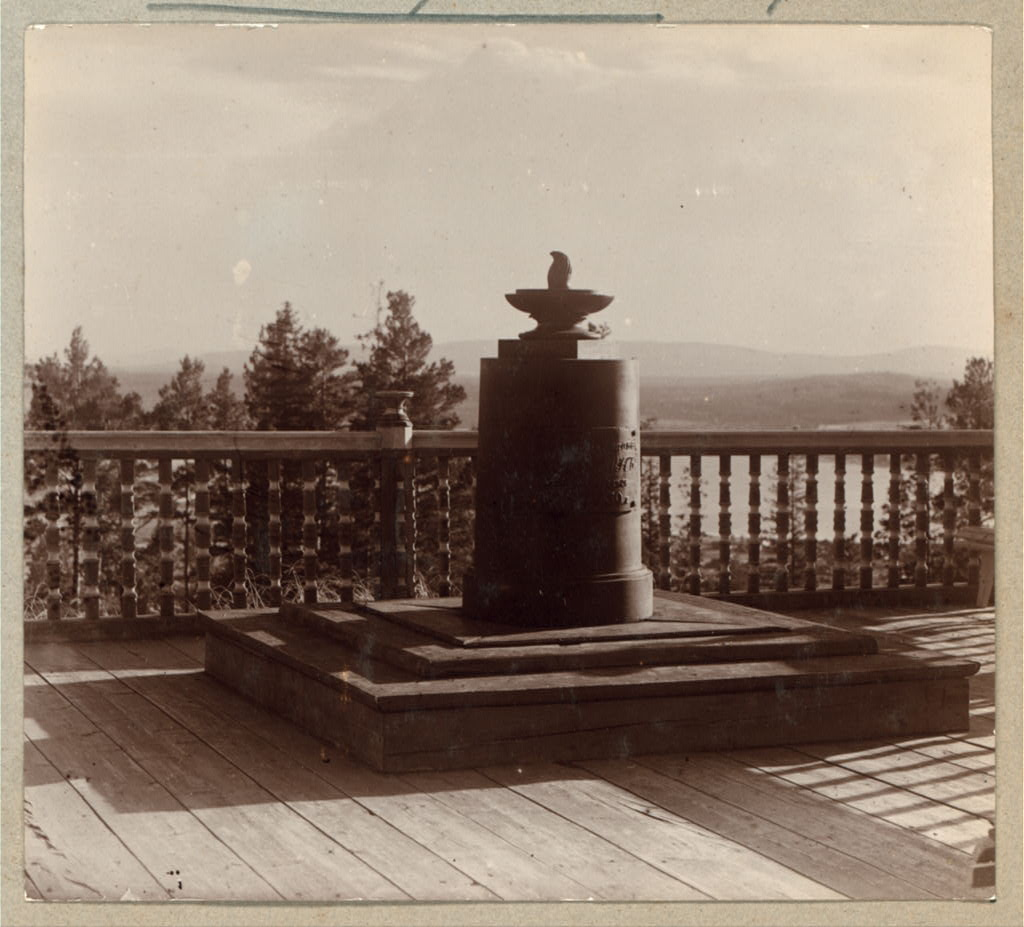
Monument to S. Chumpin in 1910. Photo by Sergey Prokudin-Gorsky.

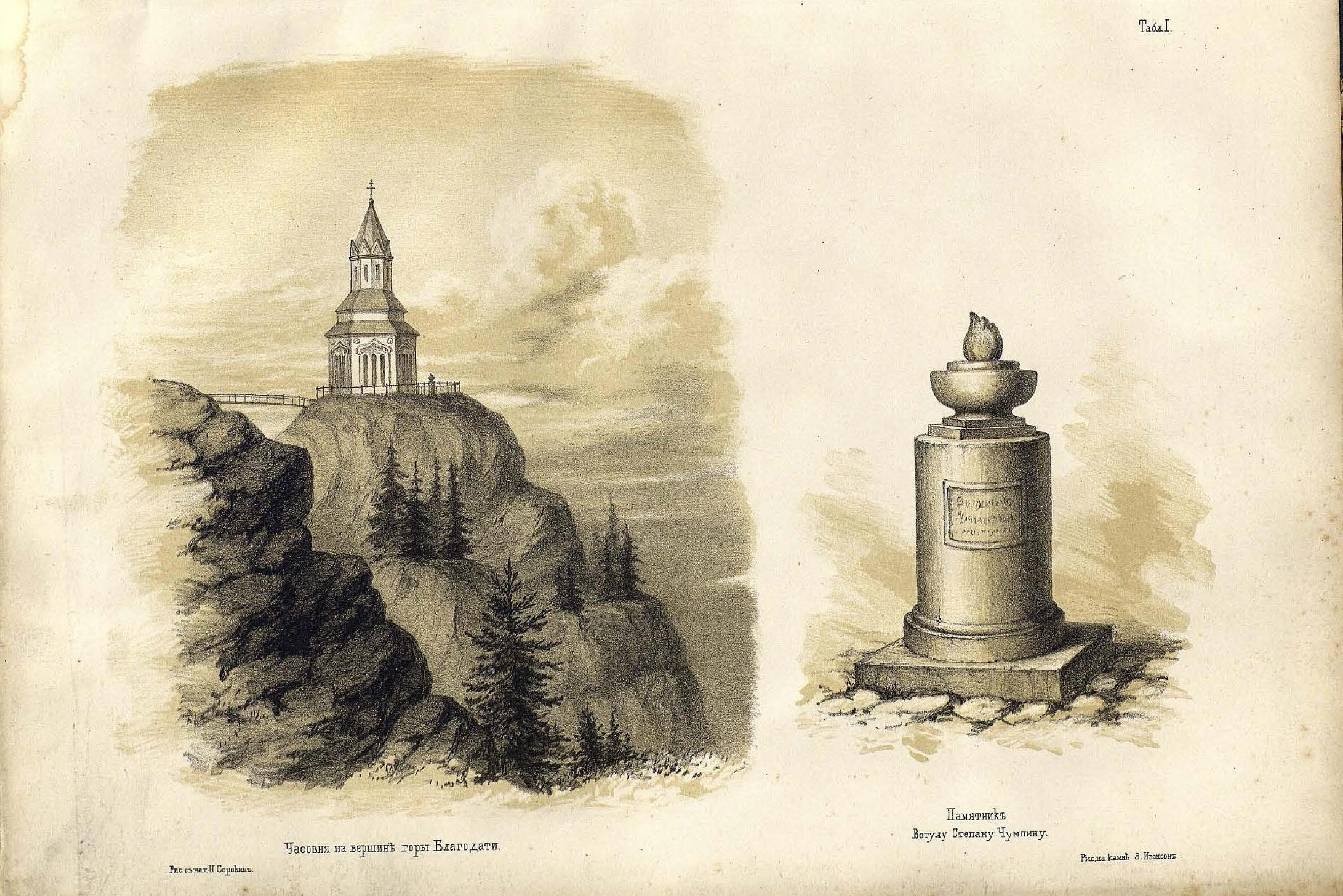
The chapel and monument. A fragment from N. Sorokin's book Travelling to the Voguls (1873).

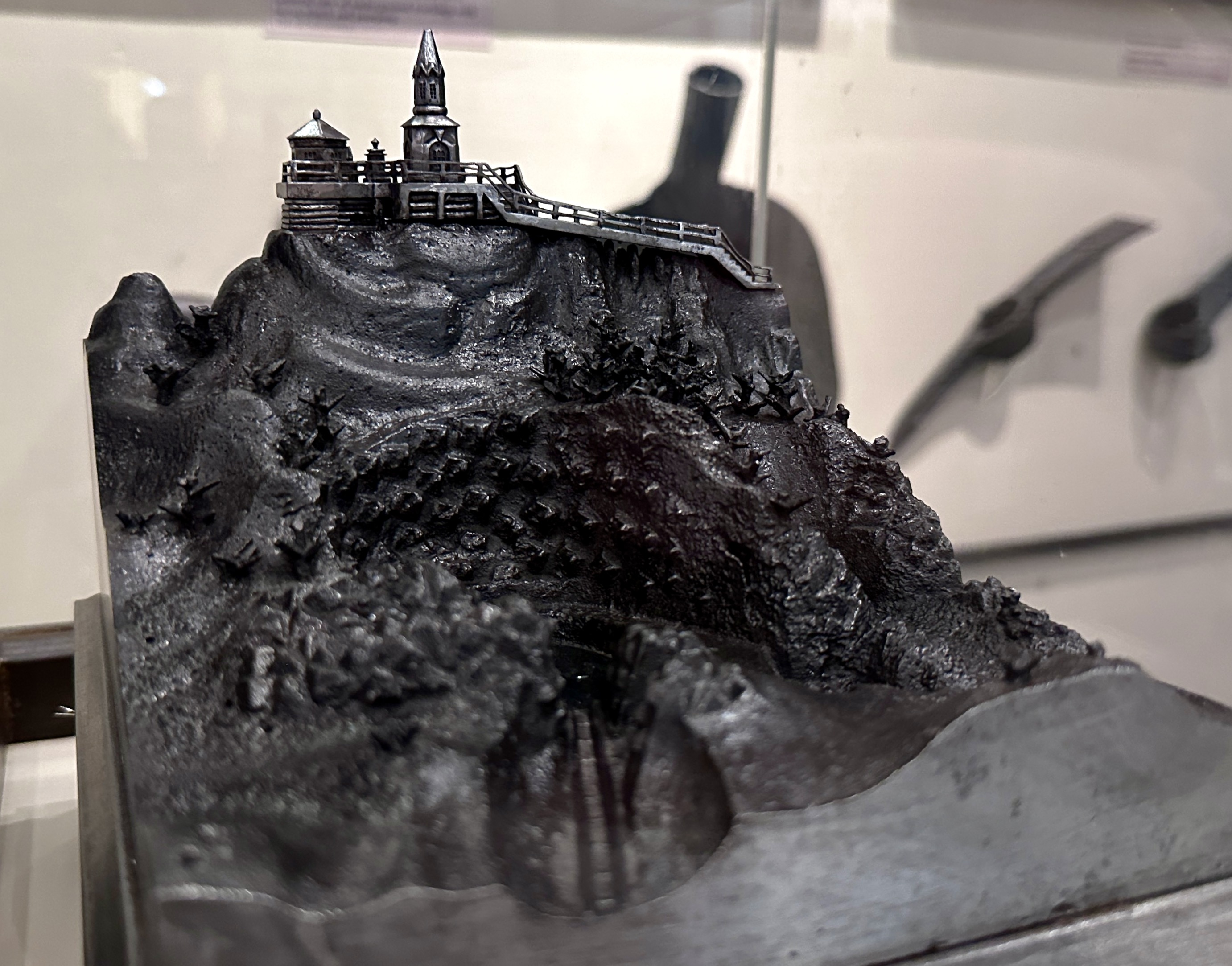
A model of the mountain in the Museum of History and Archaeology of the Urals

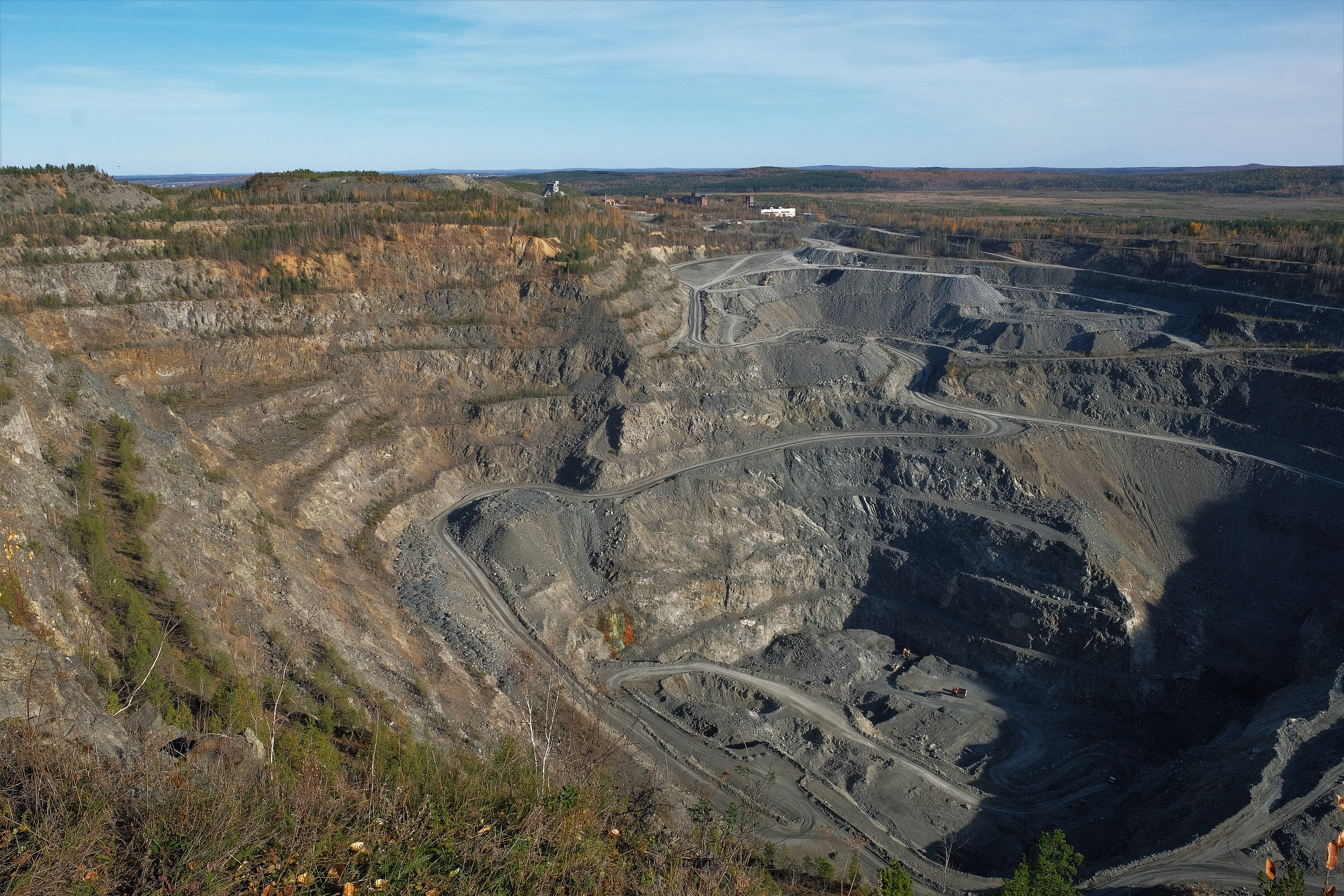
A mined-out open-pit on the site of the mountain, 2020

== See also ==
- Ural Mountains
- Sverdlovsk Oblast
- Magnetite

== Bibliography ==
- Менделеев, Д. И., ed. (1900). "Личные и фотографические впечатления Уральской поездки в июне, июле и августе 1899 г.". Уральская железная промышленность в 1899 г., по отчётам о поездке, совершённой с высочайшего соизволения: С. Вуколовым, К. Егоровым, П. Земятченским и Д. Менделеевым, по поручению г-на министра финансов, статс-секретаря С. Ю. Витте. Saint-Petersburg: Типография В. Демакова: издание Министерства финансов по департаменту торговли и мануфактур.
- Кривощёков, И. Я. (1910). Словарь Верхотурского уезда Пермской губернии. Perm: Электро-типография Губернского Земства.
- Алексеев, В. В.; Гаврилов, Д. В. (2008). Металлургия Урала с древнейших времён до наших дней [Metallurgy of the Urals from ancient times to the present day] (in Russian). Moscow: Наука. ISBN 978-5-02-036731-9.
