= Nicholas-Zaretsky Church =

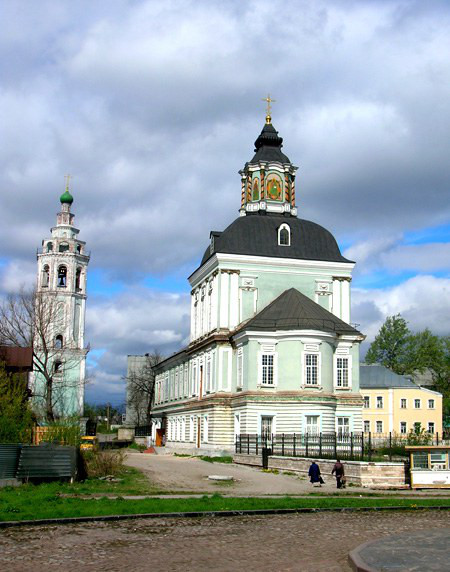
- Nicholas-Zaretsky Church
- 54°12′17.3″N 37°36′59.7″E
- Location: Tula
- Country: Russia
- Denomination: Russian Orthodox Church

History
- Status: Landmark
- Founded: 1730
- Founder: Akinfiy Demidov
- Consecrated: 1734

Architecture
- Style: Petrine Baroque

Administration
- Diocese: Diocese of Tula and Belevskoy

Clergy
- Abbot: Archpriest Victor Matveev

The Nicholas-Zaretsky Church (Николо-Зарецкий храм) is a church in Tula in Russia. It contains the family vault of the Demidov family of industrialists. Its usual name is the Nicholas-Zaretsky Church, though it has held various others over time.

== History ==
The church originated as two separate wooden structures from the 17th century, which were replaced between 1730 and 1734 by a new double-nave church. Akinfiy Nikitich Demidov, the son of Nikita Demidov, is considered the founder of the new building.

The church has several side chapels, featuring paintings of the Nativity, Saint Nicholas, Andrew the Apostle and Tikhon of Kaluga. In 1734, a new crypt chapel was built for the burials of the Demidov family. A bell tower in the Yaroslava-Suzdal style was also constructed near the church.

During the Soviet era, the church was closed and used as a warehouse, but it has since been restored to use as a place of worship.
