= Akinfiy Nikitich Demidov =

- Акинфий Никитич Демидов
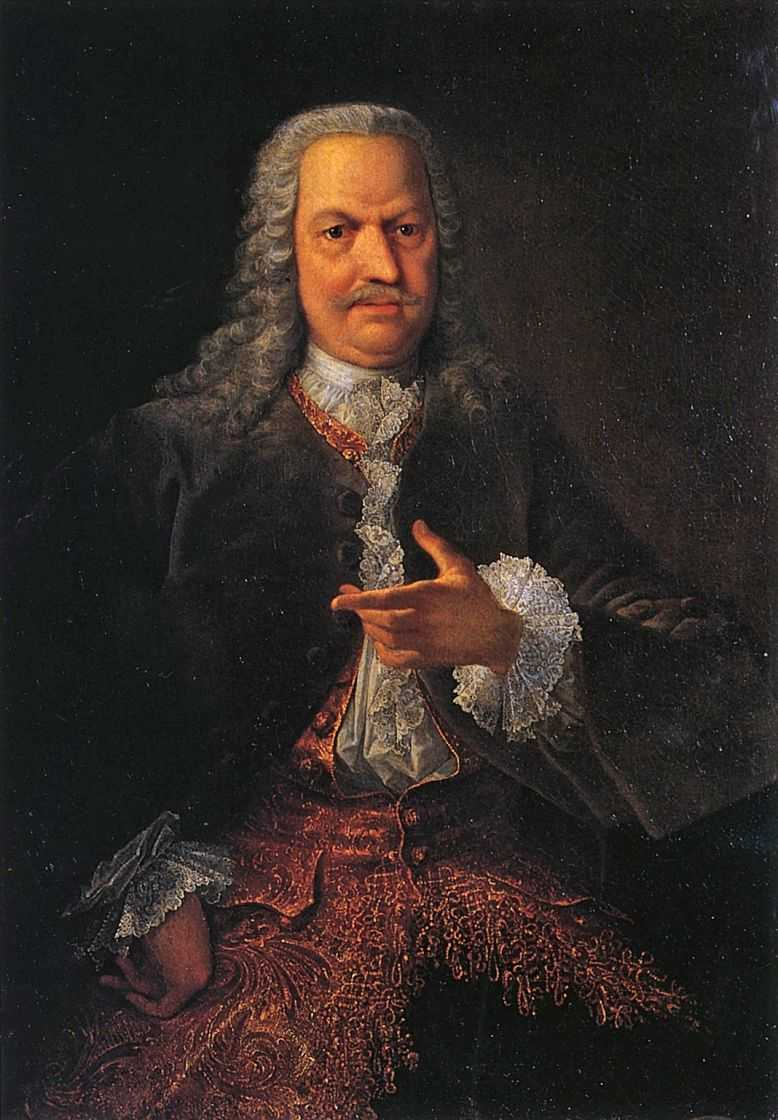
- Born: 1678; Tula
- Died: August 5, 1745 (aged 66–67); Yatskoye Ustye, Menzelinsky Uyezd, Orenburg Governorate
- Occupation: Industrialist

Akinfiy Nikitich Demidov (Russian: Акинфий Никитич Демидов) (1678 Tula - 5 August 1745 Yatskoye Ustye, Menzelinsky Uyezd, Orenburg Governorate) was a Russian industrialist of the Demidov family.

== Life ==
He was the eldest son of Nikita Demidov and increased the family fortune, raising it to one of Russia's most important industrial dynasties. He studied the secrets of metallurgical production in Saxony.

He zealously set to work and became the creator of the "empire" of the Demidovs, which by the middle of the 18th century produced 52% of all Russian metal. He set up at least nine steel foundries and munitions factories from 1717 to 1735, and had 25 by his death. He also created iron and copper mines in the Urals and Western Siberia to supply them and mines for precious and semi-precious stones, silver and gold.

In 1720, having bought from Nikolai Fedorovich Golovin an estate in the Barminskaya volost of the Nizhny Novgorod district, the Demidovs received a letter of nobility from Tsar Peter the Great rewarding his services by making him a hereditary nobleman, as he also did with Akinfiy's brothers.

He commissioned the Leaning Tower of Nevyansk, with its underground rooms and secret routes towards one of his factories. By the end of his life Akinfiy was the richest man bar the Tsar. In 1734 he founded the Nicholas-Zaretsky Church in Tula.

In 1740, Akinfiy Demidov received the rank of State Councillor (статский советник), and in 1744 a Privy Councillor (действительный статский советник). Empress Elizaveta Petrovna granted a special patronage, that the Demidov brothers were exempted from compulsory military service and many taxes. The Demidovs turned out to be the freest, according to one of the biographers of the family, people in Russia.

=== Family ===
He married firstly Avdotya Jevdokia Tarassovna Korobkova (1688-1728), and married secondly in 1723 Jevfemia Ivanovna Paltseva (1713-1771). He had five children:

- Maria Akinfievna Demidova (1706-after 1760), married Fedor Petrovich Volodimerov and had issue.
- Prokofi Akinfiyevich Demidov (1710-1786); married firstly Matryona Antipovna Pastukhova (1711-1764) and secondly Tatyana Vasilievna Semyonova (1746-1800). Had nine children with the first wife and two children with the second wife.
- Grigory Akinfiyevich Demidov (14 November 1715 - 13 November 1761), married 23 May 1731 Anastasia Pavlovna Surovtzova (16 December 1713 - 3 December 1763), and had issue;
- Nikita Akinfiyevich Demidov (1724-1789); married three times, had issue.
- Jevfemia Akinfiyevna Demidova (17??-1772), married Ivan Mikhailovich Serdukov and had issue.
