= Kirovgrad =

Town in Sverdlovsk Oblast, Russia

Kirovgrad Кировград
- Town
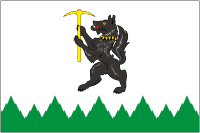
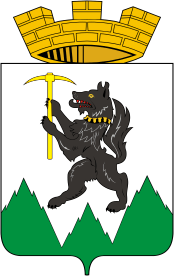
- Flag Coat of arms
- Interactive map of Kirovgrad
- Location of Kirovgrad Kirovgrad (Sverdlovsk Oblast)
- Coordinates: 57°26′06″N 60°03′22″E
- Country: Russia
- Federal subject: Sverdlovsk Oblast
- Founded: 1661, 1663, or 1675
- Elevation: 290 m (950 ft)

Population (2010 Census)
  - Total: 21,035
  - Estimate (2025): 18,234 (−13.3%)

Administrative status
  - Subordinated to: Town of Kirovgrad
  - Capital of: Town of Kirovgrad

Municipal status
  - Urban okrug: Kirovgradsky Urban Okrug
  - Capital of: Kirovgradsky Urban Okrug
- Time zone: UTC+5 (MSK+2)
- Postal code: 624140
- OKTMO ID: 65744000001

Kirovgrad (Russian: Кировград) is a town in Sverdlovsk Oblast, Russia. Population: 21,035 (2010 census); 23,197 (2002 census); 25,598 (1989 Soviet census).

== History ==
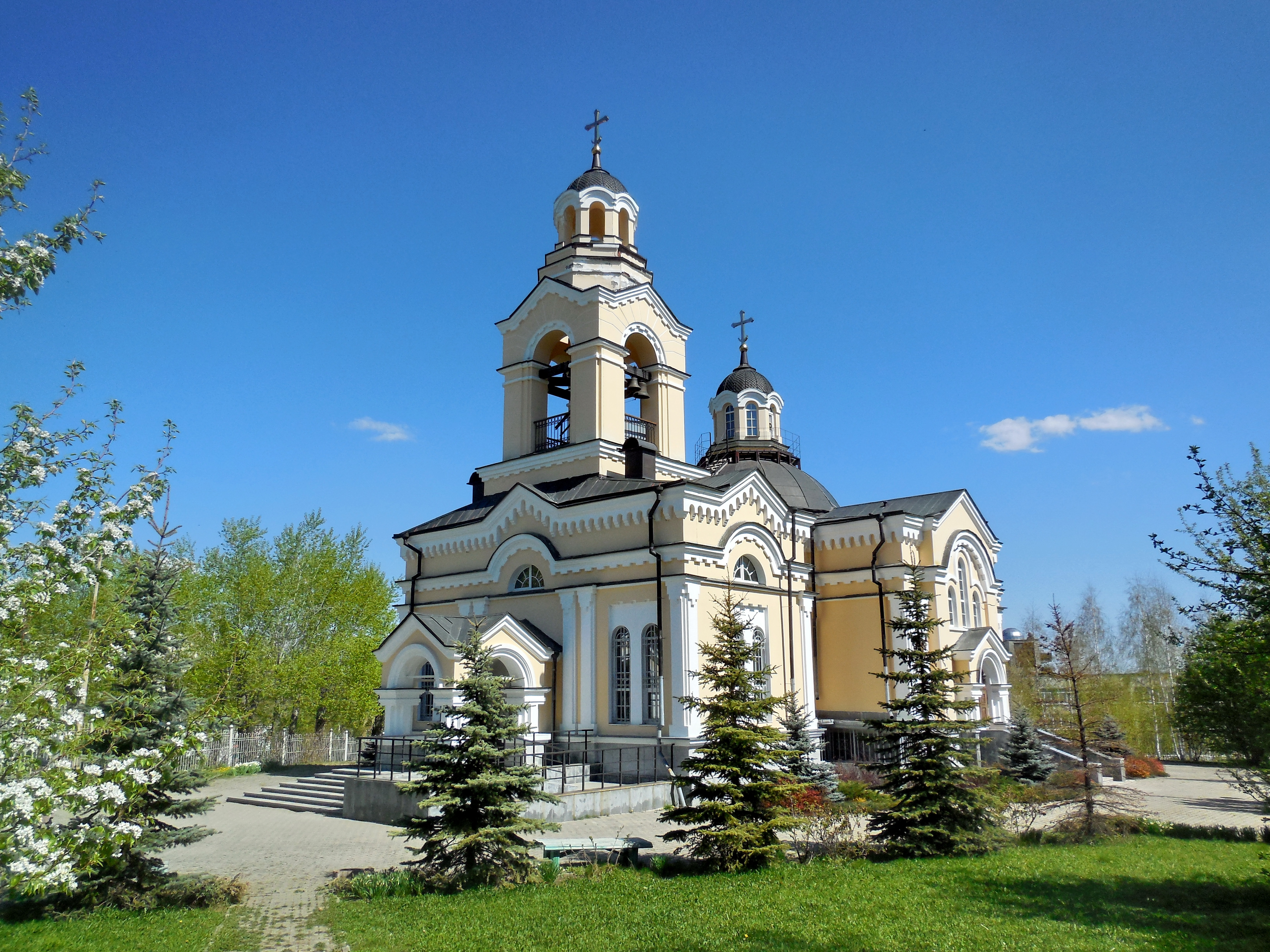
Churches

The settlement Kalatay (Kala-ata in Turkic means "father's place") was, according to various sources, founded in 1661, 1663, or 1675. In 1932, it was given its present name; after Sergey Kirov, a prominent Bolshevik.

== Administrative and municipal status ==
Within the framework of the administrative divisions, it is, together with the town of Verkhny Tagil and ten rural localities, incorporated as the Town of Kirovgrad—an administrative unit with the status equal to that of the districts. As a municipal division, Kirovgrad and eight rural localities are incorporated as Kirovgradsky Urban Okrug. The town of Verkhny Tagil, together with two other rural localities, is incorporated separately as Verkhny Tagil Urban Okrug.

== Notable people ==
- Galina Kurlyandskaya (born 1961), Russian physicist
