= Svobodny, Sverdlovsk Oblast =

Work settlement in Sverdlovsk Oblast, Russia

Svobodny Свободный
- Work settlement
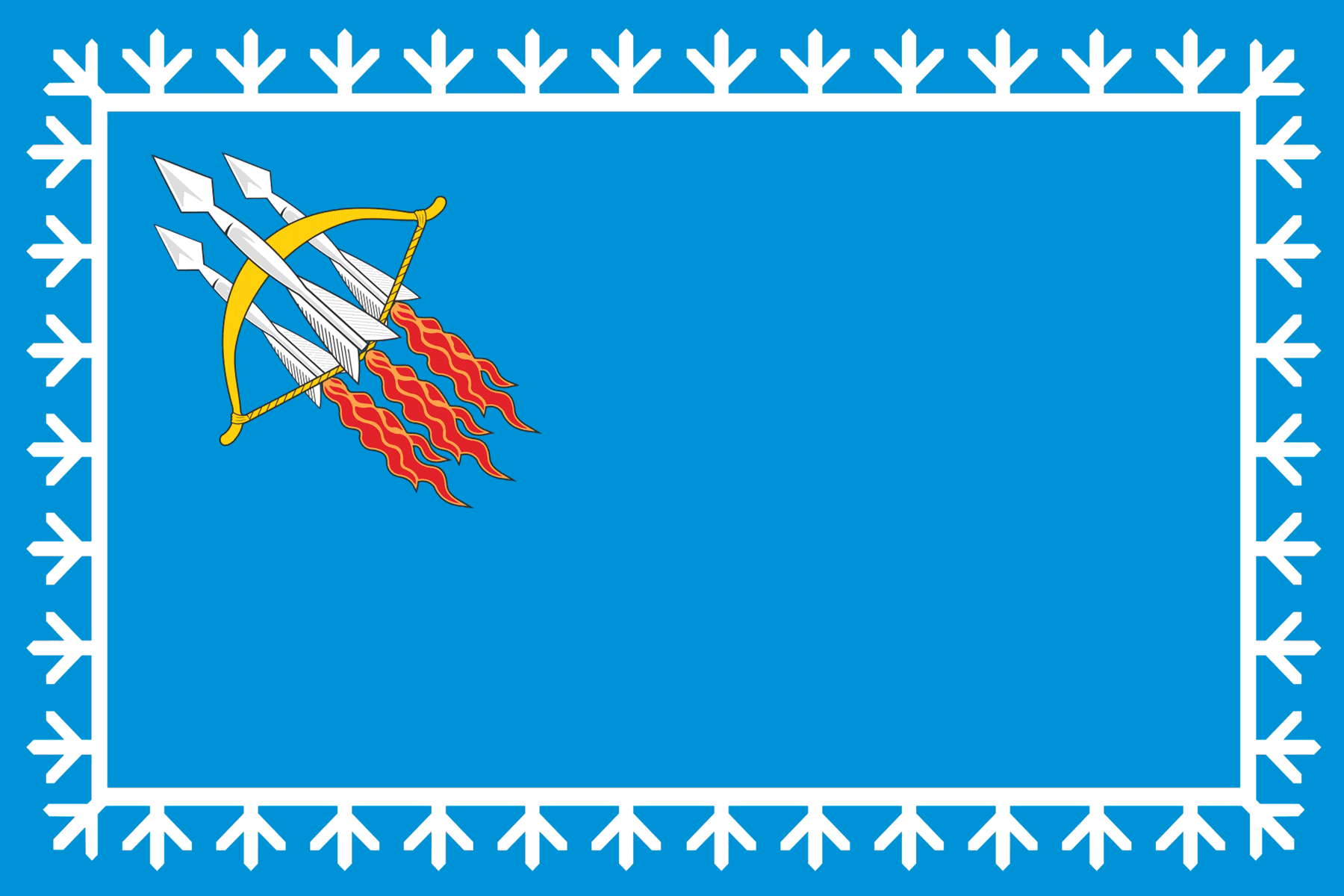
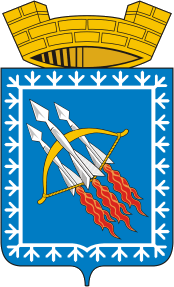
- Flag Coat of arms
- Interactive map of Svobodny
- Location of Svobodny Svobodny (Sverdlovsk Oblast)
- Coordinates: 58°02′38″N 60°23′46″E
- Country: Russia
- Federal subject: Sverdlovsk Oblast
- Founded: 1960

Population (2010 Census)
  - Total: 8,198
  - Estimate (2025): 8,304 (+1.3%)

Administrative status
  - Subordinated to: closed administrative-territorial formation of Svobodny
  - Capital of: closed administrative-territorial formation of Svobodny

Municipal status
  - Urban okrug: Svobodny Urban Okrug
  - Capital of: Svobodny Urban Okrug
- Time zone: UTC+5 (MSK+2)
- Postal code: 624790
- OKTMO ID: 65765000051
- Website: адм-затосвободный.рф

Svobodny (Russian: Свобо́дный) is a closed urban locality (a work settlement) in Sverdlovsk Oblast, Russia, located 185 kilometers (115 mi) from Yekaterinburg. Population: 8,198 (2010 census); 9,667 (2002 census).

== Administrative and municipal status ==
Within the framework of the administrative divisions, it is incorporated as the closed administrative-territorial formation of Svobodny—an administrative unit with the status equal to that of the districts. As a municipal division, the closed administrative-territorial formation of Svobodny is incorporated as Svobodny Urban Okrug.
