= Verkh-Neyvinsky =

Verkh-Neyvinsky Верх-Нейвинский
- Work settlement
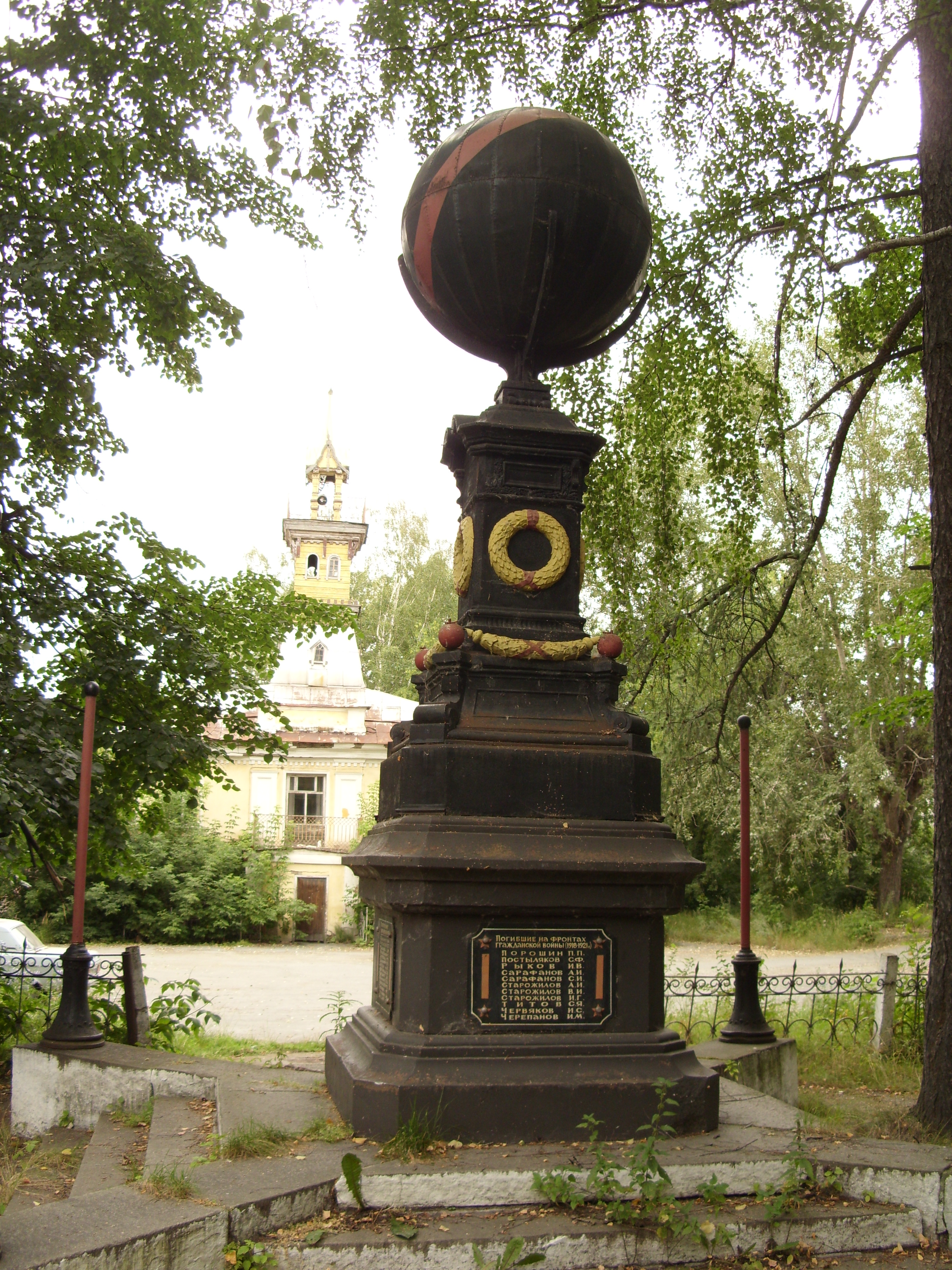
- A monument to the fighters for the power of the Soviets

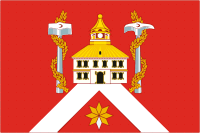
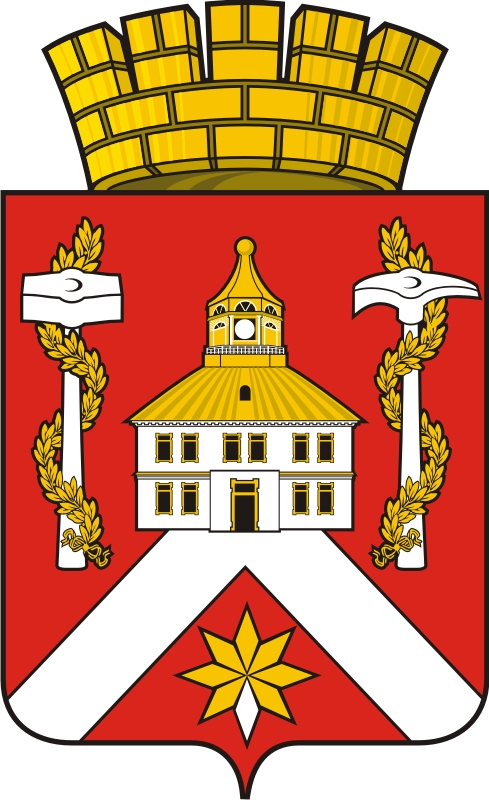
- Flag Coat of arms
- Interactive map of Verkh-Neyvinsky
- Location of Verkh-Neyvinsky Verkh-Neyvinsky (Sverdlovsk Oblast)
- Coordinates: 57°15′N 60°08′E
- Country: Russia
- Federal subject: Sverdlovsk Oblast
- Administrative district: Nevyansky District
- Founded: 1662
- Urban-type settlement status since: 1928

Government
  - Body: Administration of the Verkh-Neyvinsky Urban Okrug
  - Head: Yelena Plokhikh

Area
  - Total: 9.5 km^{2} (3.7 sq mi)
- Elevation: 267 m (876 ft)

Population
  - Estimate (2018): 4,949 )

Municipal status
  - Urban okrug: Verkh-Neyvinsky Urban Okrug
  - Capital of: Verkh-Neyvinsky Urban Okrug
- Time zone: UTC+5 (MSK+2)
- Postal code: 624170
- OKTMO ID: 65761000051
- Urban-type settlement Day: Metallurgist Day
- Website: vneyvinsk.midural.ru

Verkh-Neyvinsky (Russian: Верх-Нейвинский) is an urban locality (a work settlement) in Nevyansky District of Sverdlovsk Oblast, Russia. Population: 5,098 (2010 census); 5,242 (2002 census); 6,546 (1989 Soviet census).

== History ==
Work settlement status was granted to it in 1928.

== Administrative and municipal status ==
Within the framework of administrative divisions, Verkh-Neyvinsky is subordinated to Nevyansky District. As a municipal division, the work settlement of Verkh-Neyvinsky is incorporated as Verkh-Neyvinsky Urban Okrug.
