= Verkhnyaya Tura =

Town in Sverdlovsk Oblast, Russia

Verkhnyaya Tura Верхняя Тура
- Town
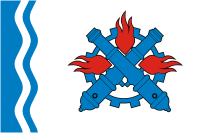
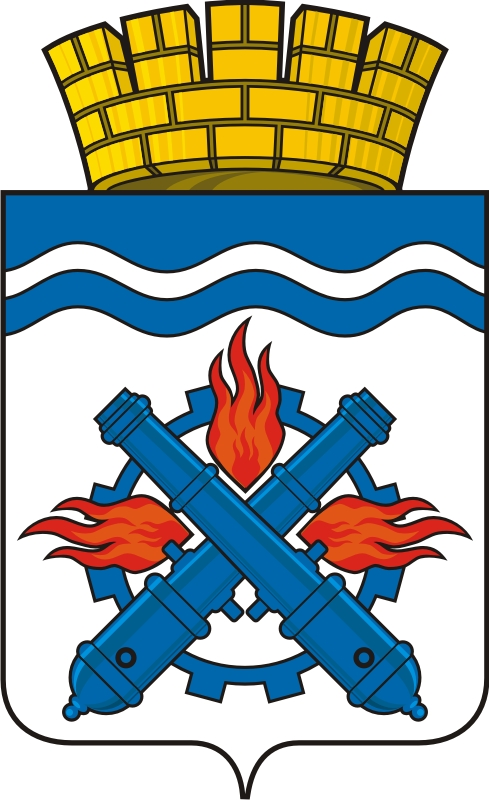
- Flag Coat of arms
- Interactive map of Verkhnyaya Tura
- Location of Verkhnyaya Tura Verkhnyaya Tura (Sverdlovsk Oblast)
- Coordinates: 58°21′34″N 59°49′03″E
- Country: Russia
- Federal subject: Sverdlovsk Oblast
- Founded: 1737
- Town status since: 1941
- Elevation: 220 m (720 ft)

Population (2010 Census)
  - Total: 9,461
  - Estimate (2025): 8,279 (−12.5%)

Administrative status
  - Subordinated to: Town of Kushva

Municipal status
  - Urban okrug: Verkhnyaya Tura Urban Okrug
  - Capital of: Verkhnyaya Tura Urban Okrug
- Time zone: UTC+5 (MSK+2)
- Postal code: 624320
- OKTMO ID: 65734000001

Verkhnyaya Tura (Russian: Ве́рхняя Тура) is a town under the administrative jurisdiction of the Town of Kushva in Sverdlovsk Oblast, Russia, located in the upper streams of the Tura River (Ob's basin), 187 kilometers (116 mi) north of Yekaterinburg. Population: 9,461 (2010 census); 11,097 (2002 census); 13,573 (1989 Soviet census).

== History ==
It was founded in 1737; town status was granted to it in 1941.

== Administrative and municipal status ==
Within the framework of the administrative divisions, it is, together with twelve rural localities, subordinated to the Town of Kushva—an administrative unit with the status equal to that of the districts. As a municipal division, the town of Verkhnyaya Tura is incorporated as Verkhnyaya Tura Urban Okrug. The town of Kushva and twelve rural localities are incorporated separately as Kushvinsky Urban Okrug.
