= Verkhny Tagil =

Town in Sverdlovsk Oblast, Russia

Verkhny Tagil Верхний Тагил
- Town
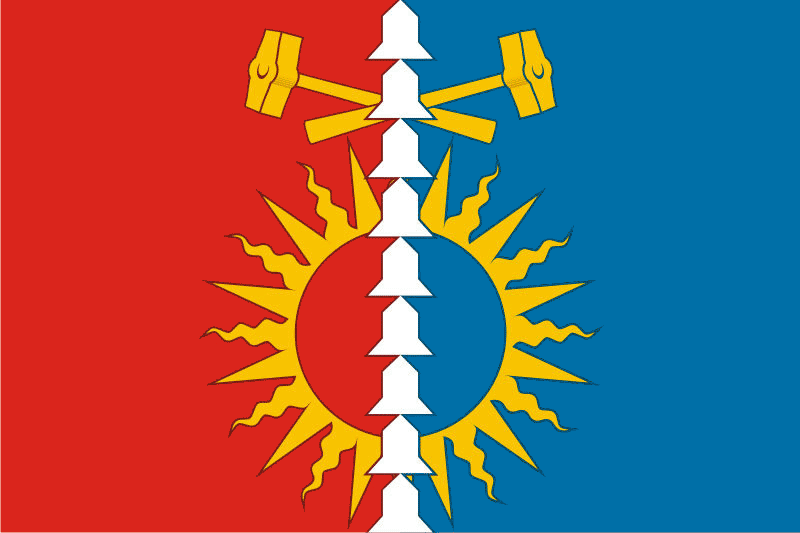
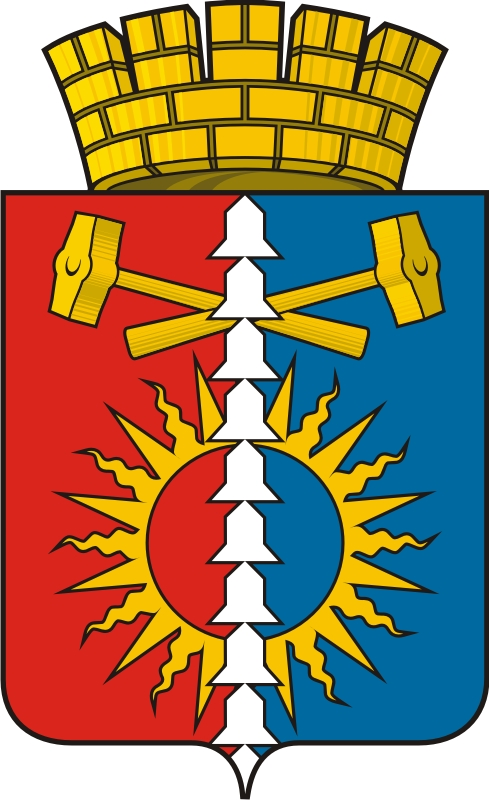
- Flag Coat of arms
- Interactive map of Verkhny Tagil
- Location of Verkhny Tagil Verkhny Tagil (Sverdlovsk Oblast)
- Coordinates: 57°23′N 59°57′E
- Country: Russia
- Federal subject: Sverdlovsk Oblast
- Founded: 1716
- Town status since: 1966
- Elevation: 260 m (850 ft)

Population (2010 Census)
  - Total: 11,843
  - Estimate (2025): 9,779 (−17.4%)

Administrative status
  - Subordinated to: Town of Kirovgrad

Municipal status
  - Urban okrug: Verkhny Tagil Urban Okrug
  - Capital of: Verkhny Tagil Urban Okrug
- Time zone: UTC+5 (MSK+2)
- Postal codes: 624160, 624162
- OKTMO ID: 65733000001
- Website: go-vtagil.ru

Verkhny Tagil (Russian: Ве́рхний Таги́л) is a town under the administrative jurisdiction of the Town of Kirovgrad in Sverdlovsk Oblast, Russia, located in the upper streams of the Tagil River (Tobol's basin), 111 kilometers (69 mi) northwest of Yekaterinburg, the administrative center of the oblast. Population: 11,843 (2010 census); 12,571 (2002 census); 13,127 (1989 Soviet census).

== History ==
It was founded in 1716. Town status was granted to it in 1966.

== Administrative and municipal status ==
Within the framework of the administrative divisions, it is, together with ten rural localities, subordinated to the Town of Kirovgrad—an administrative unit with the status equal to that of the districts. As a municipal division, Verkhny Tagil, together with two rural localities, is incorporated as Verkhny Tagil Urban Okrug. The town of Kirovgrad, together with eight other rural localities, is incorporated separately as Kirovgradsky Urban Okrug.
