= Kushva =

Town in Sverdlovsk Oblast, Russia

Kushva Кушва
- Town
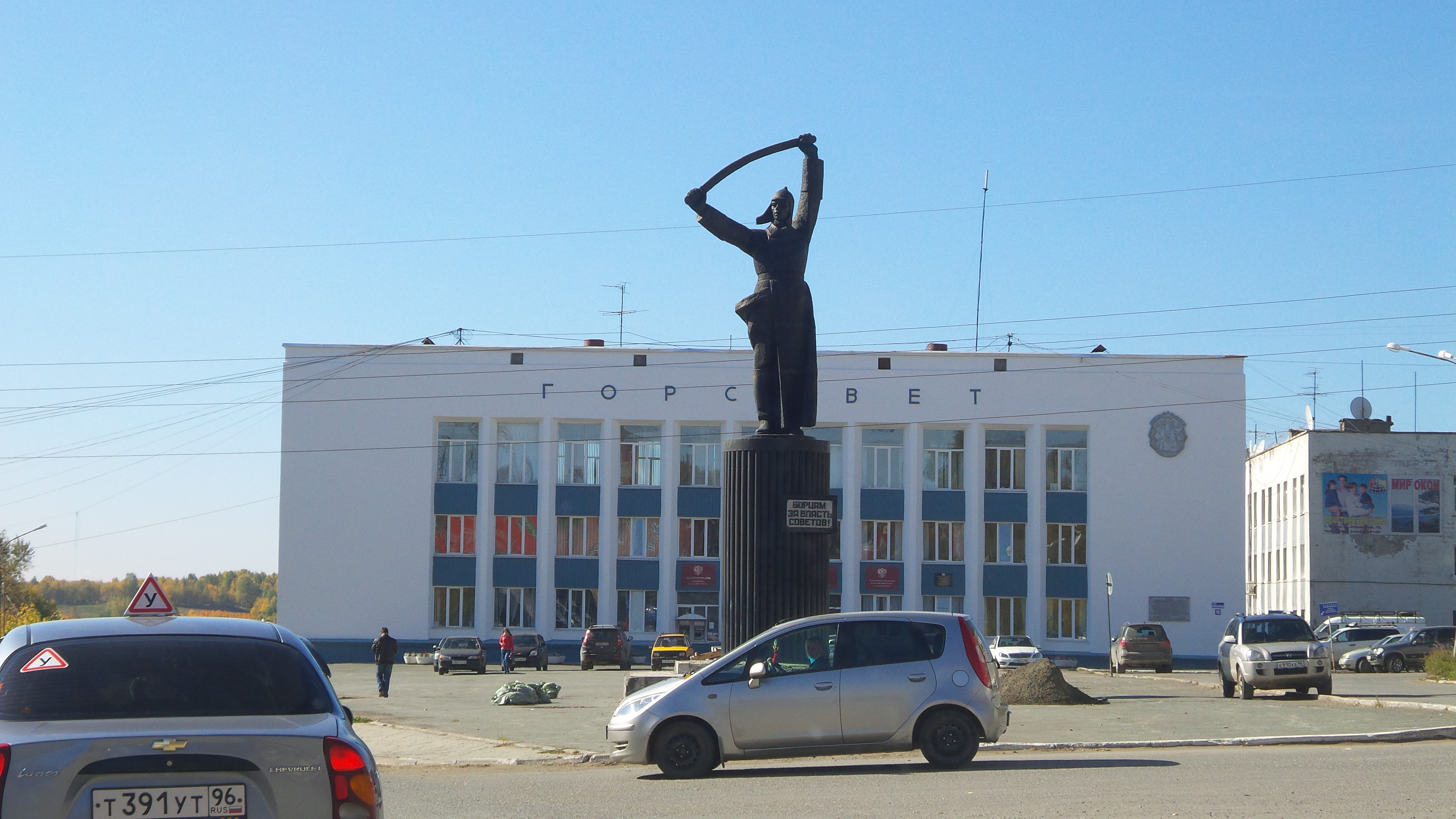
- Kushva town hall, September 2014

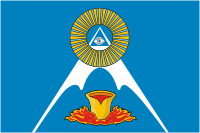
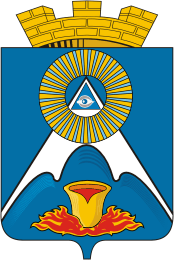
- Flag Coat of arms
- Interactive map of Kushva
- Location of Kushva Kushva (Sverdlovsk Oblast)
- Coordinates: 58°17′N 59°44′E
- Country: Russia
- Federal subject: Sverdlovsk Oblast
- Founded: 1735
- Town status since: 1926
- Elevation: 240 m (790 ft)

Population (2010 Census)
  - Total: 30,167
  - Estimate (2025): 26,347 (−12.7%)

Administrative status
  - Subordinated to: Town of Kushva
  - Capital of: Town of Kushva

Municipal status
  - Urban okrug: Kushvinsky Urban Okrug
  - Capital of: Kushvinsky Urban Okrug
- Time zone: UTC+5 (MSK+2)
- Postal code: 624300–624303
- OKTMO ID: 65748000001

Kushva (Russian: Кушва) is a town in Sverdlovsk Oblast, Russia, located in the Ural Mountains near Yekaterinburg. Population: 30,167 (2010 census); 35,555 (2002 census); 43,096 (1989 Soviet census).

== History ==
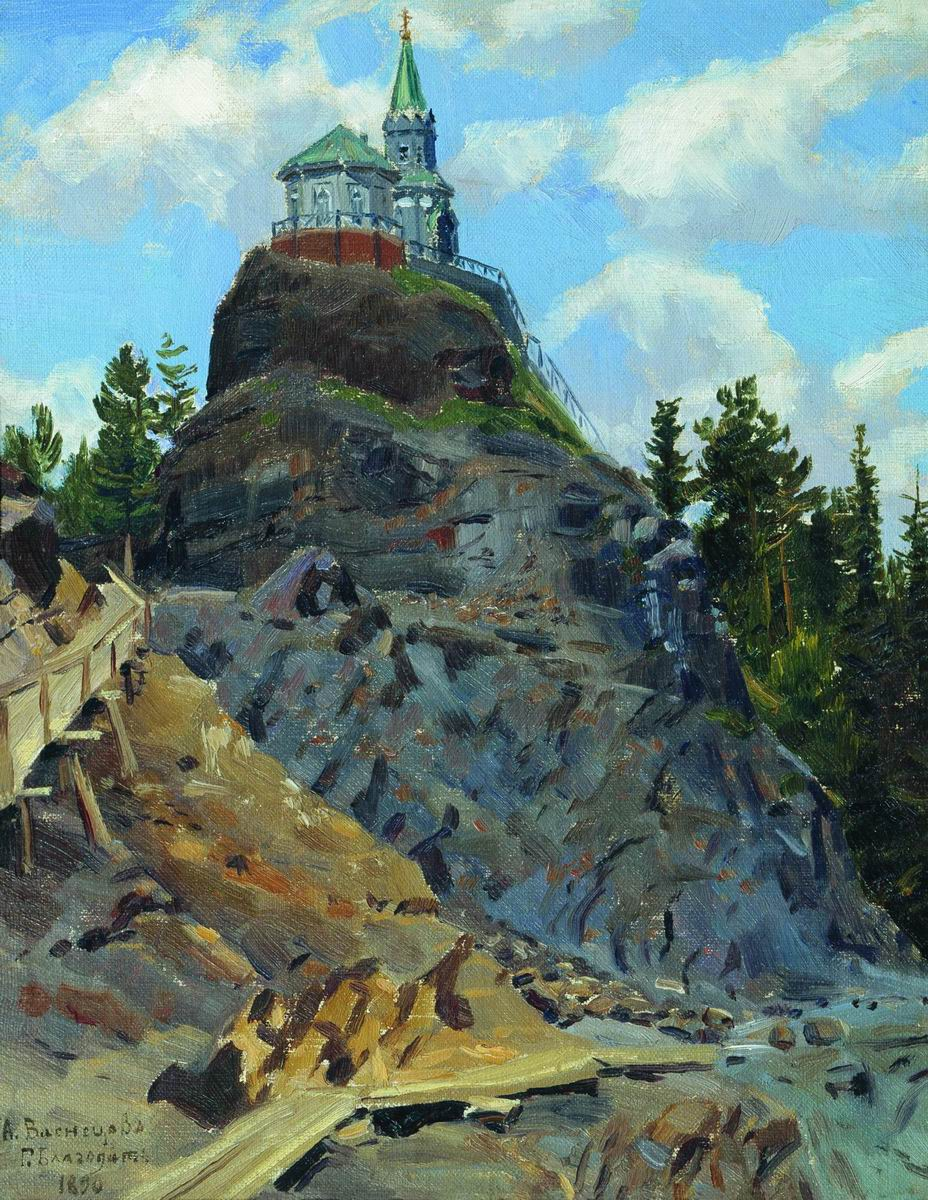
Blagodat Mountain, by Apollinary Vasnetsov, 1890

Originally a mining settlement founded in 1735 at the Blagodat Mountain to explore its iron ore deposits, it was granted town status in 1926 and was then renamed from Kushvinsky Zavod (Кушвинский Завод) to Kushva. Currently it is stagnant and its population is decreasing as most of the mining industry closed down.

On June 22, 2026, a large and intense IF3 tornado struck the town directly, damaging 204 residential buildings, and destroying 18 private houses and severely damaging 147 private houses. 39 apartment buildings were partially damaged, and vegetation was destroyed. 21 people were injured with a handful needing immediate medical attention. Local surveyors from Russia observed damages and rated this an F4, while the ESSL rated this an IF3, with one claim stating that structure strength was the main part behind an IF4 rating, as one log house had strange weakness in comparison of an average home. Overall 35,000 people were affected by the tornado. This remains one of the worst tornadoes Russia has faced in over 9 years.

== Administrative and municipal status ==
Within the framework of the administrative divisions, it is, together with the town of Verkhnyaya Tura and twelve rural localities, incorporated as the Town of Kushva—an administrative unit with the status equal to that of the districts. As a municipal division, Kushva and twelve rural localities are incorporated as Kushvinsky Urban Okrug. The town of Verkhnyaya Tura is incorporated separately as Verkhnyaya Tura Urban Okrug.

== Honors ==
A crater on Mars was named in honor of the town.
