= Nevyansky District =

District in Sverdlovsk Oblast, Russia

Nevyansky District Невьянский район (Russian)
- District
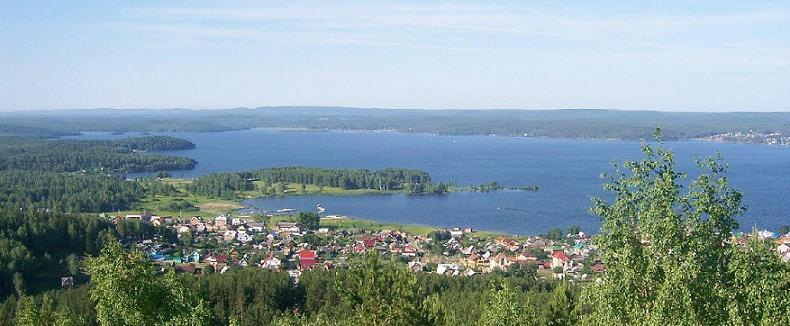
- Tavatuy Lake

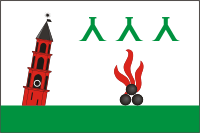
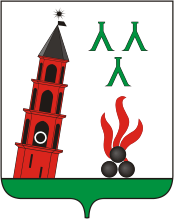
- Flag Coat of arms
- Location of Nevyansky District in Sverdlovsk Oblast
- Coordinates: 57.490°N 60.211°E
- Country: Russia
- Federal subject: Sverdlovsk Oblast
- Established: 23 July 1928
- Administrative center: Nevyansk

Area
  - Total: 1,967 km^{2} (759 sq mi)

Population (2010 Census)
  - Total: 22,833
  - Density: 11.61/km^{2} (30.06/sq mi)
  - Urban: 22.3%
  - Rural: 77.7%

Administrative structure
  - Administrative divisions: 1 Towns, 1 Work settlements, 9 Selsoviets
  - Inhabited localities: 1 cities/towns, 1 urban-type settlements, 37 rural localities

Municipal structure
  - Municipally incorporated as: Nevyansky Urban Okrug
- Website: http://nevyansk66.ru/in/md/main

Nevyansky District (Russian: Невьянский райо́н) is an administrative district (raion), one of the thirty in Sverdlovsk Oblast, Russia. The area of the district is 1,967 square kilometers (759 sq mi). Its administrative center is the town of Nevyansk. Population (excluding the administrative center): 22,833 (2010 Census); 24,516 (2002 census); 31,345 (1989 Soviet census).

== Administrative and municipal status ==
Within the framework of administrative divisions, Nevyansky District is one of the thirty in the oblast. The town of Nevyansk serves as its administrative center.

As a municipal division, the territory of the district is split between two municipal formations—Nevyansky Urban Okrug, to which the town of Nevyansk and thirty-seven of the administrative district's rural localities belong, and Verkh-Neyvinsky Urban Okrug, which covers the rest of the administrative district's territory, including the work settlement of Verkh-Neyvinsky.
