= Nevyansk =

Town in Sverdlovsk Oblast, Russia

Nevyansk Невьянск
- Town
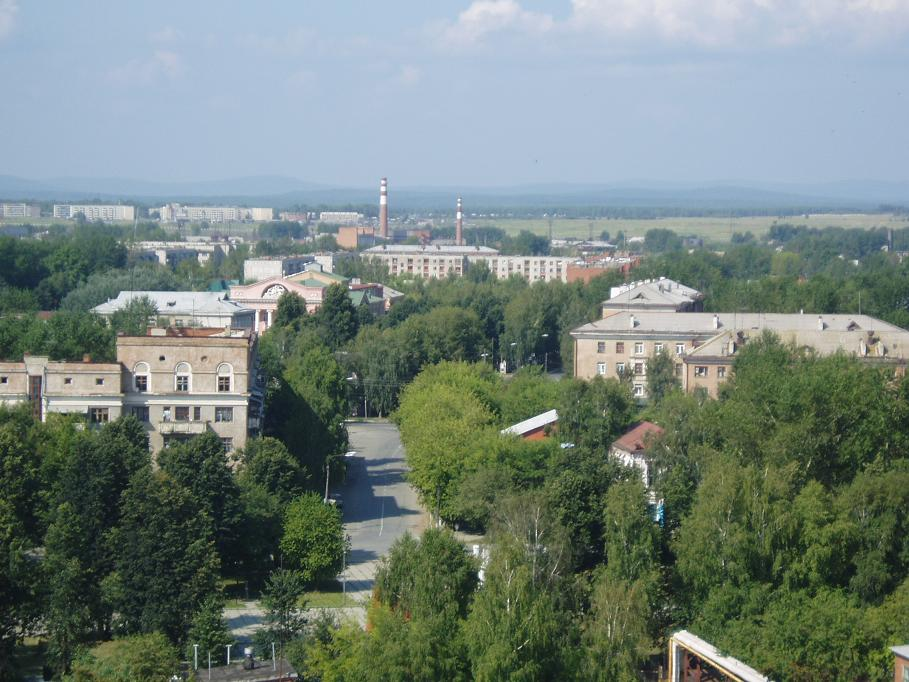
- View of the town from the Leaning Tower of Nevyansk

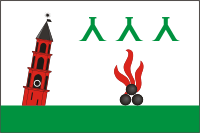
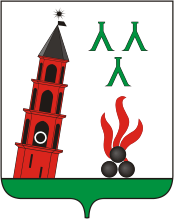
- Flag Coat of arms
- Interactive map of Nevyansk
- Location of Nevyansk Nevyansk (Sverdlovsk Oblast)
- Coordinates: 57°29′N 60°12′E
- Country: Russia
- Federal subject: Sverdlovsk Oblast
- Administrative district: Nevyansky District
- Founded: 1700
- Town status since: 1919
- Elevation: 240 m (790 ft)

Population (2010 Census)
  - Total: 24,567
  - Estimate (2025): 22,079 (−10.1%)

Administrative status
  - Capital of: Nevyansky District

Municipal status
  - Urban okrug: Nevyansky Urban Okrug
  - Capital of: Nevyansky Urban Okrug
- Time zone: UTC+5 (MSK+2)
- Postal code: 624191–624194
- OKTMO ID: 65714000001
- Website: nevyansk66.ru

Nevyansk (Russian: Невья́нск) is a town and the administrative center of Nevyansky District in Sverdlovsk Oblast, Russia, located on the Neyva River (Ob's basin) on the eastern slope of the Middle Urals, 97 kilometers (60 mi) north of Yekaterinburg. Population: 24,567 (2010 census); 26,644 (2002 census); 29,764 (1989 Soviet census); 29,800 (1970).

== History ==
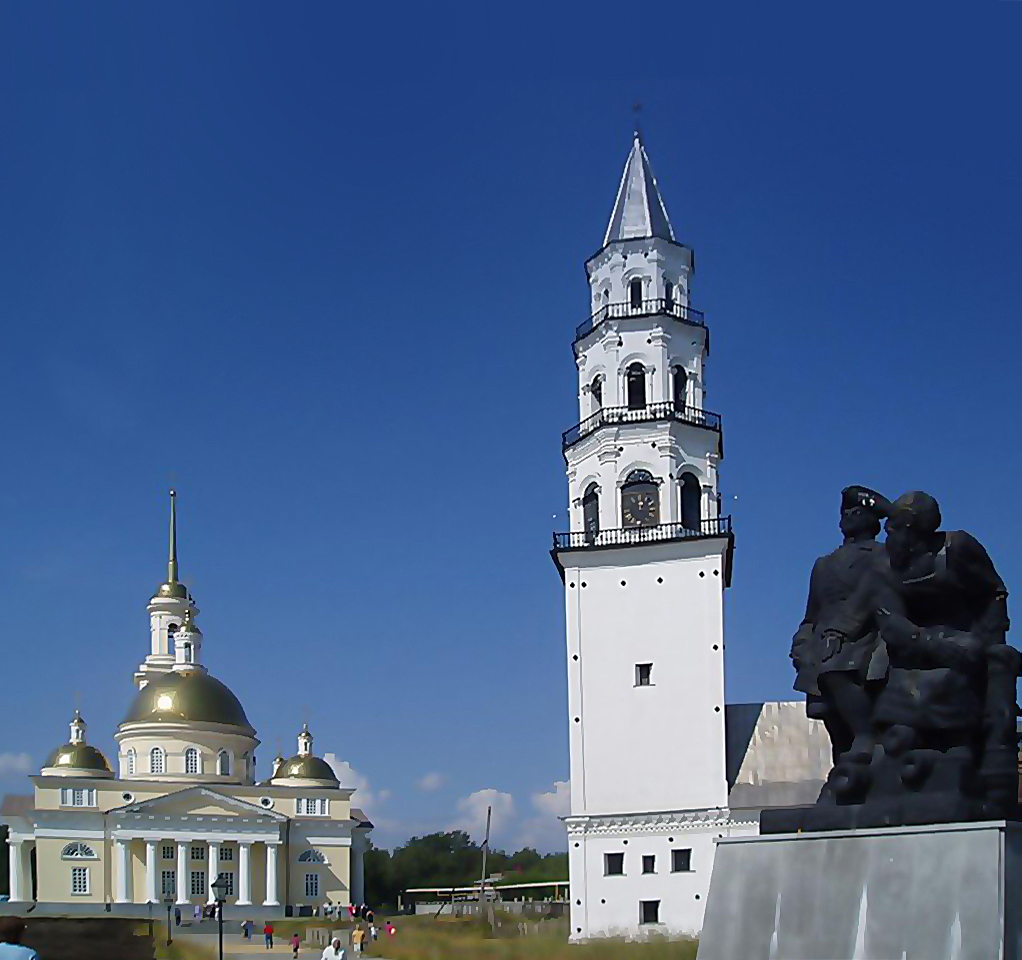
The Old Believers' church (left), the Leaning Tower (center), and the monument to Peter the Great and Nikita Demidov (right) in central Nevyansk

The posad of Nevyansk was founded in 1700 due to the construction of a foundry and iron factory, which Peter the Great gave to Nikita Demidov, along with 3,900,000 acres of land. Although it was not granted town status until 1919, it became highly important for the well-being of the Demidov family, which extracted gold from the local foothills. In the 18th century, Nevyansk was settled primarily by Old Believers, who commissioned from local artisans some glimmering, stylish icons which may be regarded as the last phase in the history of Russian icon-painting. As for the Demidovs, they commissioned the 60-meter (200 ft) high Leaning Tower of Nevyansk, which was erected sometime between 1725 and 1740 and remains the town's principal landmark and claim to fame.

=== Flag and the coat of arms ===
Nevyansk's flag and coat of arms features symbols of the city: the Leaning Tower, cannonballs, and Y-shaped tools used for prospecting.

== Administrative and municipal status ==
Within the framework of administrative divisions, Nevyansk serves as the administrative center of Nevyansky District and is subordinated to it. As a municipal division, the town of Nevyansk together with thirty-seven rural localities in Nevyansky District is incorporated as Nevyansky Urban Okrug.
