= Gornouralsky (urban locality) =

Urban-type settlement in Sverdlovsk Oblast, Russia

Gornouralsky Горноуральский
- Urban-type settlement
- Interactive map of Gornouralsky
- Location of Gornouralsky Gornouralsky (Sverdlovsk Oblast)
- Coordinates: 58.0628°N 59.9043°E
- Country: Russia
- Federal subject: Sverdlovsk Oblast
- Founded: 1961

Population (2010 Census)
  - Total: 3,972
  - Estimate (2025): 2,738 (−31.1%)
- Time zone: UTC+5 (MSK+2)
- Postal code: 622904
- OKTMO ID: 65717000051

Gornouralsky (Russian: Горноуральский) is an urban locality (an urban-type settlement) in Sverdlovsk Oblast, Russia. Population: 3,972 (2010 census); 4,268 (2002 census); 6,164 (1989 Soviet census).
