= Prigorodny District, Sverdlovsk Oblast =

District in Sverdlovsk Oblast, Russia

Prigorodny District Пригородный район (Russian)
- District
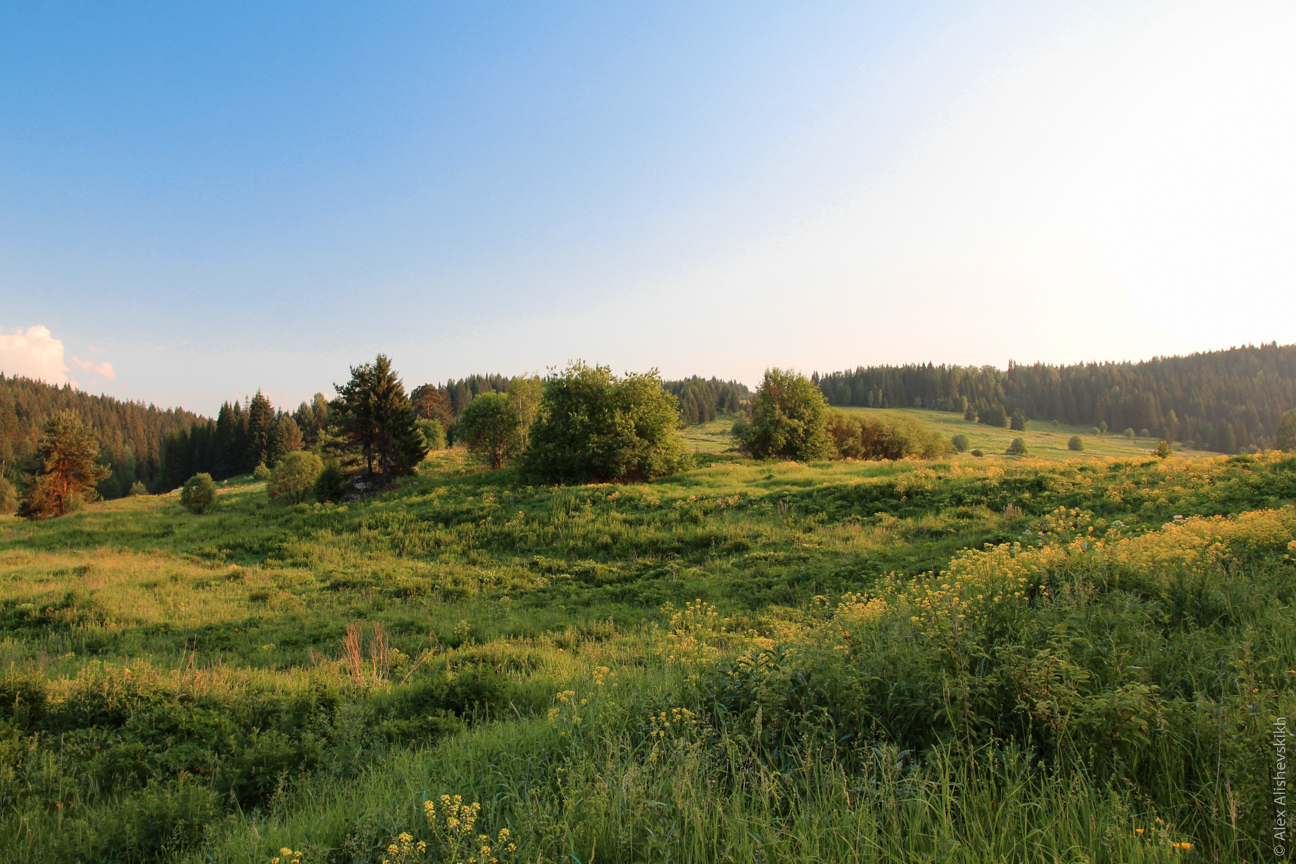
- Natural landscape in Prigorodny District

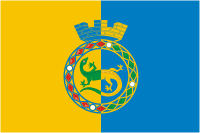
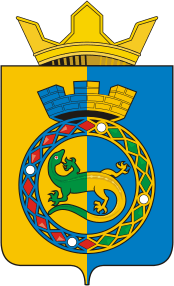
- Flag Coat of arms
- Location of Prigorodny District in Sverdlovsk Oblast
- Coordinates: 58°04′N 59°54′E
- Country: Russia
- Federal subject: Sverdlovsk Oblast
- Established: 1965
- Administrative center: Nizhny Tagil

Area
  - Total: 3,513 km^{2} (1,356 sq mi)

Population (2010 Census)
  - Total: 38,527
  - Density: 10.97/km^{2} (28.40/sq mi)
  - Urban: 10.3%
  - Rural: 89.7%

Administrative structure
  - Administrative divisions: 1 Work settlements, 21 Selsoviets
  - Inhabited localities: 1 urban-type settlements, 82 rural localities

Municipal structure
  - Municipally incorporated as: Gornouralsky Urban Okrug
- Website: http://www.grgo.ru

Prigorodny District (Russian: Пригородный райо́н) is an administrative district (raion), one of the thirty in Sverdlovsk Oblast, Russia. As a municipal division, it is incorporated as Gornouralsky Urban Okrug (Горноура́льский городско́й о́круг). The area of the district is 3,513 square kilometers (1,356 sq mi). Its administrative center is the city of Nizhny Tagil (which is not administratively a part of the district). Population: 38,527 (2010 Census); 43,488 (2002 census); 52,651 (1989 Soviet census).

== Administrative and municipal status ==
Within the framework of administrative divisions, Prigorodny District is one of the thirty in the oblast. The city of Nizhny Tagil serves as its administrative center, despite being incorporated separately as an administrative unit with the status equal to that of the districts.

As a municipal division, the district is incorporated as Gornouralsky Urban Okrug. The City of Nizhny Tagil is incorporated separately from the district as Nizhny Tagil Urban Okrug.
