= Nikita Demidov =

Russian businessman (1656–1725)

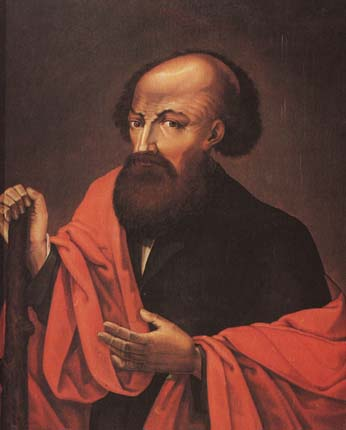
Nikita Antufiev, or Demidov

Nikita Demidov (full name Nikita Demidovich Antufiev), (5 April 1656 Tula – 28 November 1725 Tula) was a Russian industrialist who founded the Demidov industrial dynasty.

Peter I of Russia charged the enterprising blacksmith Nikita with casting cannon for his many military expeditions and he was ennobled with name Demidov for having strongly supported the tsar's activities. In 1699 he set up Nevyansk's first iron foundry and in 1725 discovered mines at Kolivan (Kolyban), whose exploitation enriched him. A museum is devoted to him in Tula.

== Life ==
The founder of the Demidov family, he was the eldest son of Demid Grigorevich Antufiev (1624–1664), a free blacksmith from Tula. Nikita began as a blacksmith himself and was put in charge of producing muskets and halberds (of which he was the main supplier) for the Russian Army by Tsar Peter the Great. Conceded many privileges, Nikita built one of Russia's first metallurgical factories in Tula between 1694 and 1696. This produced the first Russian iron to rival English- and Swedish-produced iron for quality.

In 1699, Nikita built a new factory at Yekaterinburg. He then opened Siberia's first iron mine at Kolyban. In 1702 the Tsar granted him permission to change his name to Demidov and put a new foundry in the Urals under his command - it became Russia's first true armaments factory. Between 1716 and 1725 Nikita built four new metallurgical factories in the Urals. During Russia's Great Northern War against Sweden (1700–1721), the Demidov factories became the main supplier to the Russian army, supplying cannons, pistols, swords and other munitions, producing them twice as fast and twice as cheaply as the competition and thus making a decisive contribution to the Russian victory. On 21 September he was ennobled by Tsar Peter the Great in reward for his services.

Nikita Demidov had three definitely-attested children (and a possible fourth) with his wife Evdokia Fedotovna Demidova (1660-1745):

- Akinfiy Nikitich Demidov (1678–1745). Married firstly Avdotya Jevdokia Tarassovna Korobkova and married secondly Jevfemia Ivanovna Paltseva. He had five children.
- Grigory Nikitich Demidov (1683-1728). Married firstly Anna Emelyanovna Ksenifontova and secondly Khristina Borisovna, had issue.
- Nikita Nikitich Demidov (1688-1758). Married Anastasia Gerasimovna Pastukhova, had issue.
- Anastasia Nikitichina Demidova
