= Technical University of UMMC =

- Russian: Технический университет УГМК
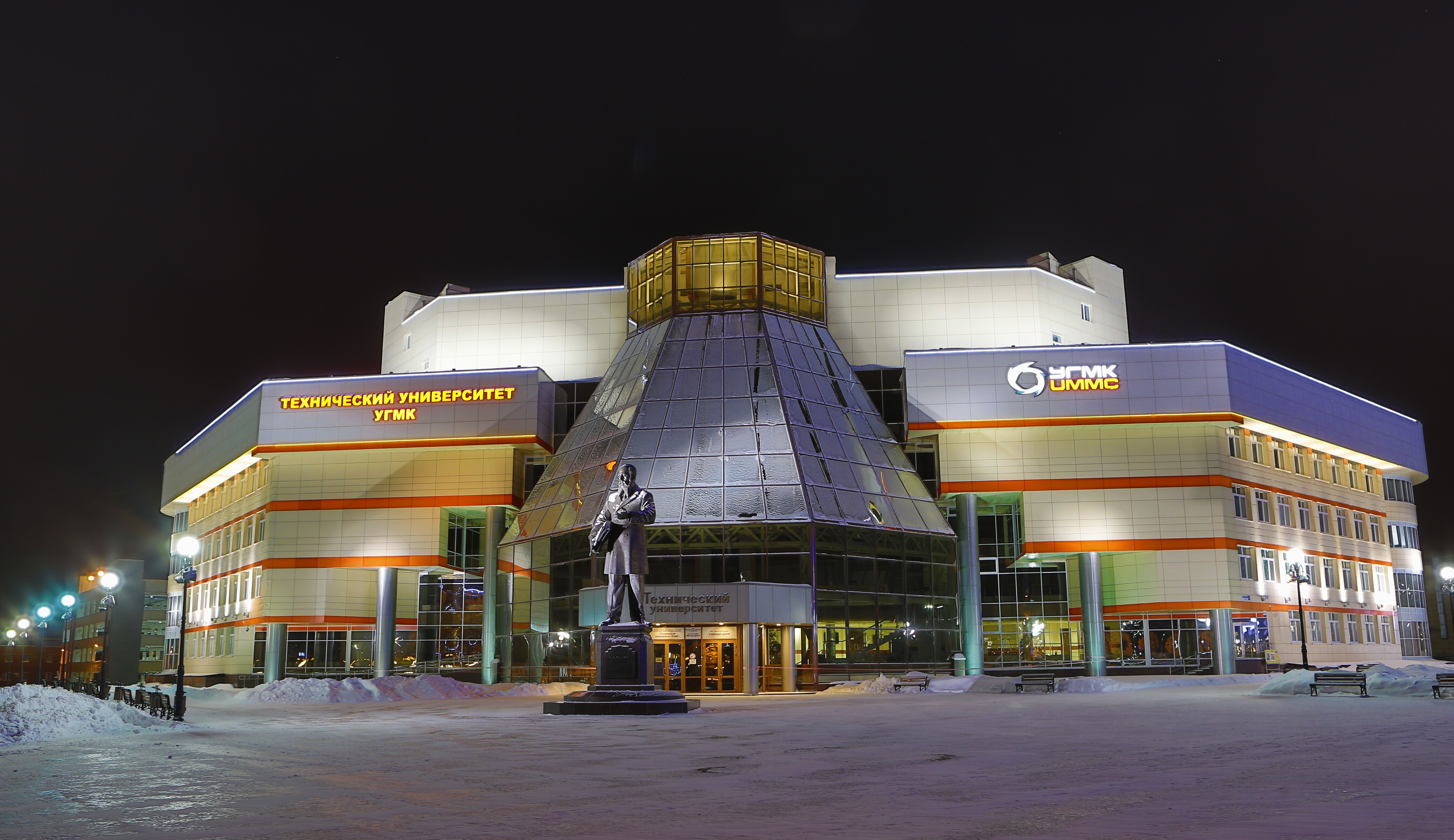
- Established: September 3, 2013
- Affiliations: Ural Mining and Metallurgical Company; Ural Federal University
- Location: Verkhnyaya Pyshma, Yekaterinburg, Sverdlovsk Oblast, Ural Federal District, Russia
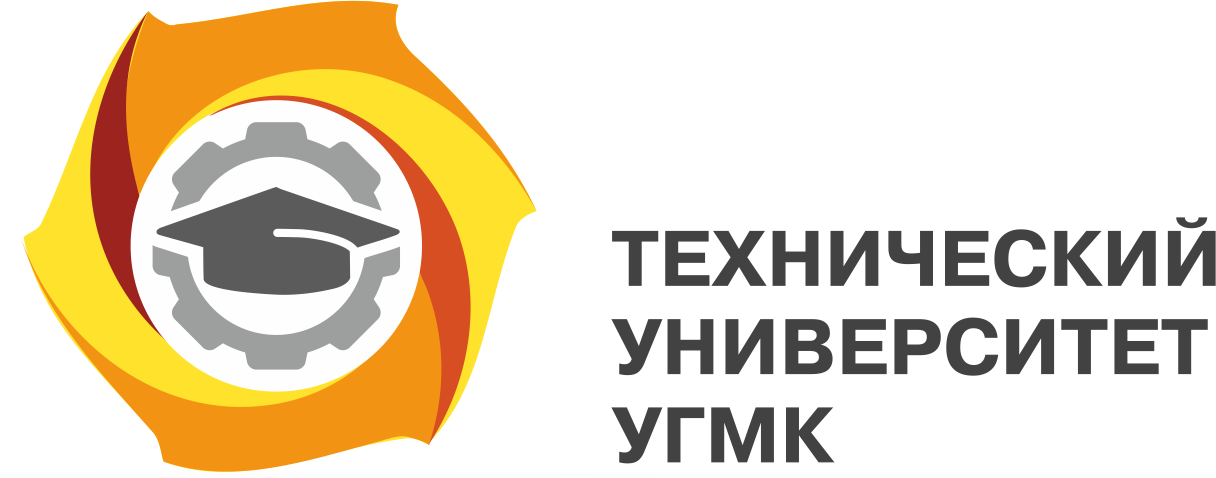

The Technical University of UMMC (Russian: Технический университет УГМК), abbreviated as UMMC TU, is a private technical college located in Verkhnyaya Pyshma, Sverdlovsk Oblast in Russia's Ural Federal District. Opened in 2013, the university is operated by the Ural Mining and Metallurgical Company and serves as a higher educational institution for industry workers.

== Description ==
=== History ===
The concept for UMMC originated in the early 2000s when the Ural Government decided to expand the region's education infrastructure, namely by building a new university outside the major industrial city of Yekaterinburg. The new university was initially planned to be part of Ural State Technical University, but delays and budget constraints brought on by the Great Recession ended these plans. Construction of the UMMC campus had already begun, but after 2008 construction was halted. During the following years, changes in Russian federal law allowed for closer partnerships between public educational institutions and business groups, including the ability for businesses to directly fund the opening of new departments in state-run educational institutions while also allowing universities to open departments at industrial enterprises.

Taking advantage of these legal changes, the plans to establish a new university were restarted in 2011. Unlike the previous proposal, the new university was independent from the Ural State Technical University and was instead a joint venture between the Ural Mining and Metallurgical Company, a major industrial conglomerate, and Ural Federal University. The Ural Mining and Metallurgical Company heavily invested in the project, while smaller amounts of funding for the program were provided by the Ural Federal University and the government of Sverdlovsk Oblast. In an interview with local media, CEO of Ural Mining Andrei Kozitsyn stated that his company saw several benefits from the project, namely the training of new employees (which would cost less than Ural Mining training them themselves), an increased culture of safety, and increased worker productivity. In addition, Kozitsyn noted that his company had agreed to fund the opening of a new department of metallurgy at Ural Federal University.

The new university opened on 3 September 2013, providing advanced training courses for Ural Mining and affiliated company employees; according to the director of the university, the institution trained around 12 thousand engineers and workers per year as of 2014. UMMC continued to expand, opening a research facility in 2014 and in 2016 announced it was allowing for graduates of secondary and technical schools to enroll.

=== Education ===
According to UMMC's website, the university offers 300 programs for enrollees seeking to continue their education. Majors in engineering at the university include:

- Metallurgy
- Mining
- Automation of processes and productions
- Electric engineering
- Process equipment
- Economics
- Management
