= UrFU, Institute of Physics and Technology =

Coordinates: 56°50′33″N 60°39′08″E

Institute of Physics and Technology
- Физико-технологический институт
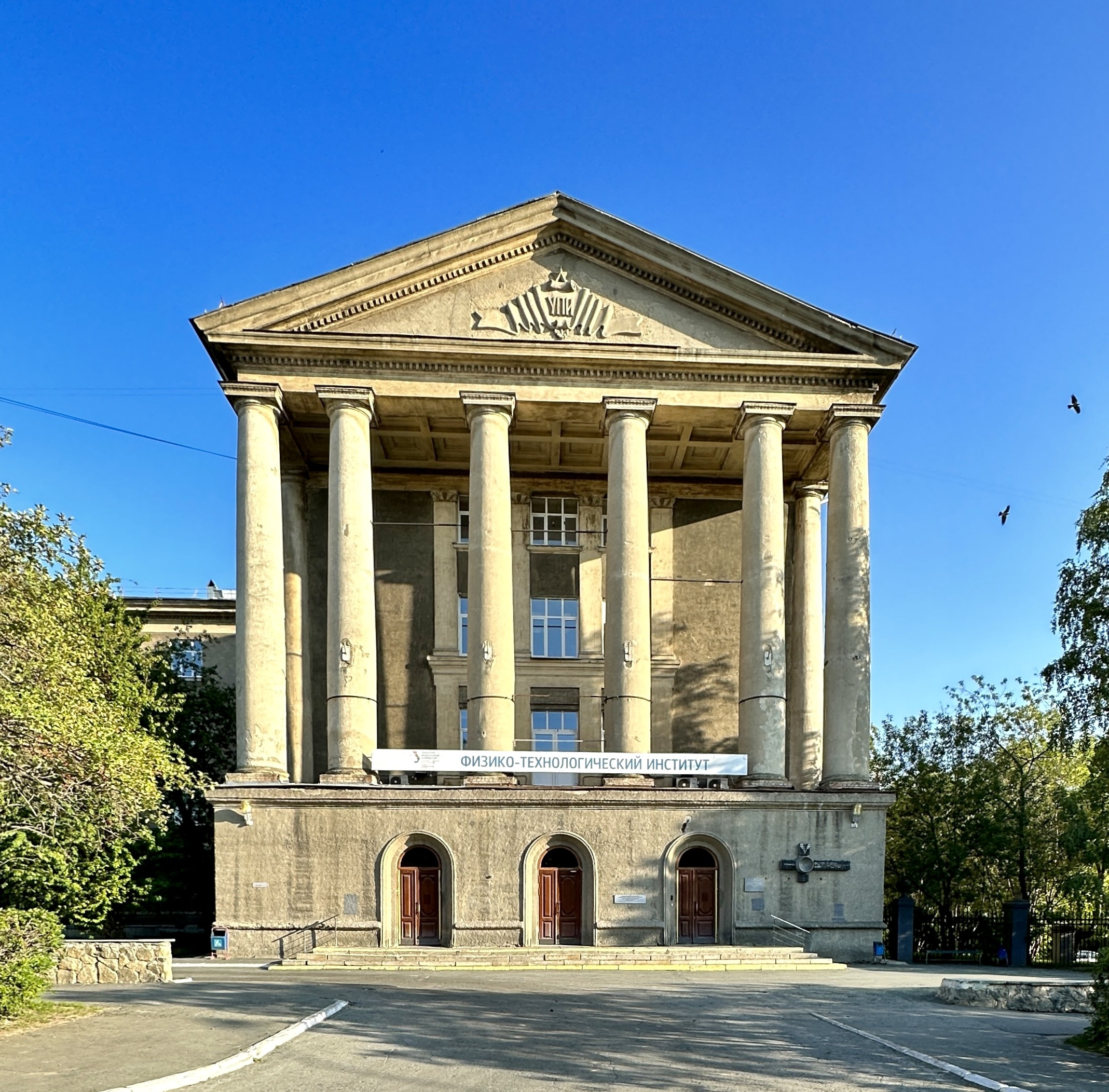
- Former names: Physical Engineering faculty of USTU-UPI
- Type: Technical institute
- Established: 1949
- Affiliations: Ural Federal University
- Director: Vladimir Ivanov
- Students: 2000
- Location: (Russia) Yekaterinburg, Sverdlovsk Oblast, Russia
- Campus: urban
- Website: https://fizteh.urfu.ru/ru/, http://ustu.ru/en/home/faculties/fti/

Institute of Physics and Technology (IPT) is one of leading institutions of Ural Federal University. IPT was transformed from Physical Engineering faculty of USTU-UPI during merging USTU-UPI and USU. The institute trains specialists in the following fields: physico-chemical, physical engineering, IT, social and humanitarian, quality management of innovative products and technologies. IPT also known as "UPI's Phystech"(Russian: Физтех УПИ, romanized: Fiztekh UPI).

== History ==
The Physical Engineering faculty of USTU-UPI was established May 27, 1949 in order to prepare personnel for the nuclear industry. Originally known as Engineering Physics Faculty, it was renamed to the Physical Engineering faculty in autumn of 1949. The first graduates (students transferred from the Power Engineering Faculty in 1949) in December 1950.

1953 - a dormitory faculty was built (10th student housing)
1956 - its own faculty building (5th academic building).

For 60 years Phystech produced more than 12,000 engineers, some of whom are directors of nuclear power plants and research institutions, university presidents, members of the Academy of Sciences of the USSR and the Russian Academy of Sciences, academicians.

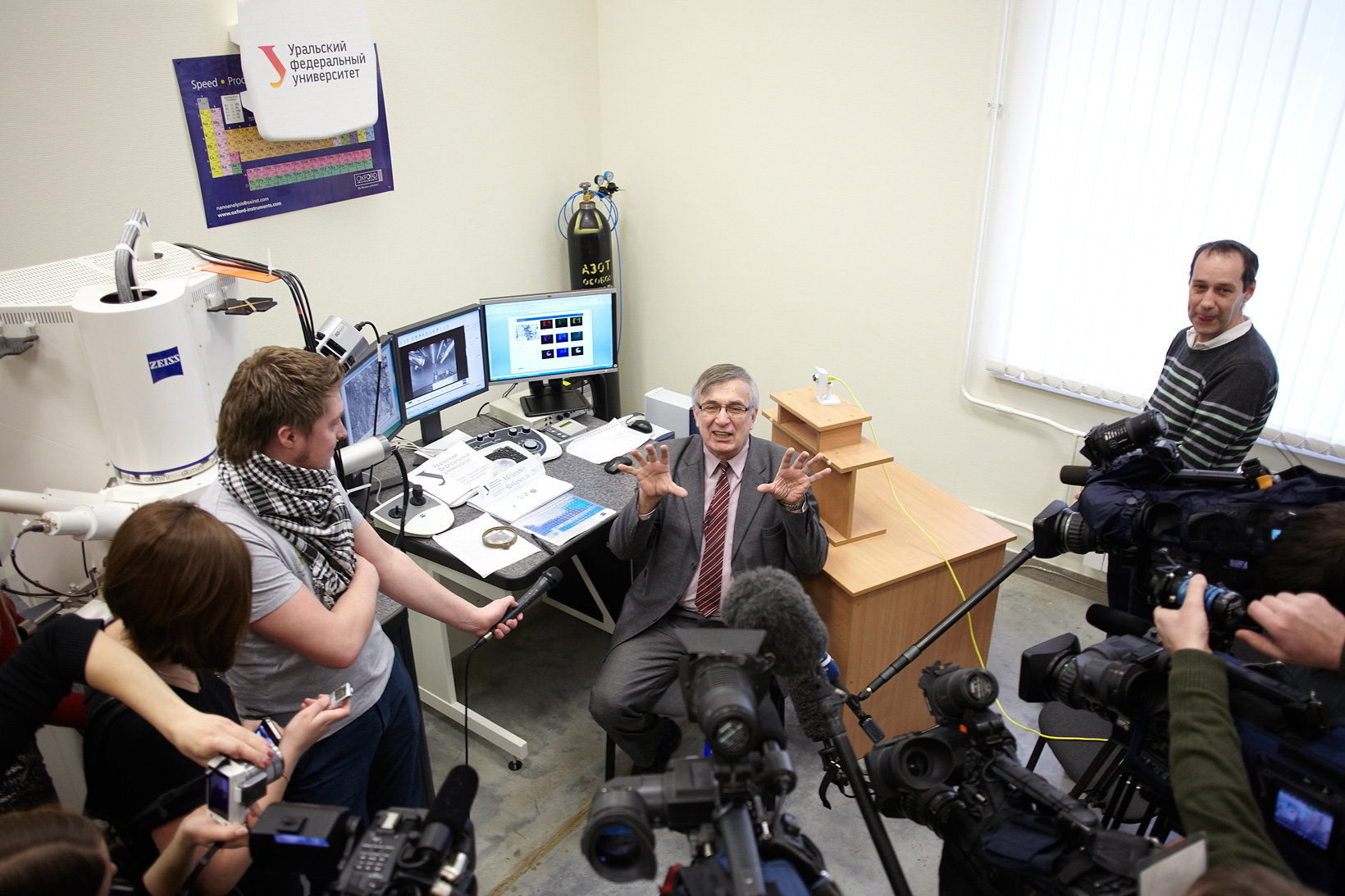
IPT associate professor Victor Grohovsky talks to press during presentation of analysis results of the samples of Chebarkul meteorite

== Deans of the faculty ==
- Krylov Evgenii Ivanovich (1949–1956)
- Vlasov Vasily Grigorievich (1956–1958)
- Derjaguin Pavel Ilyich (1958–1960)
- Raspopin Sergei Pavlovich (1960–1962)
- Skripov Vladimir Pavlovich (1962–1964)
- Dmitriev, Ivan Aleksandrovich (1964–1970)
- Suetin Parigory Evstafievich (1970–1976)
- Egorov Yuri Vyacheslavovich (1976–1986)
- Beketov Askold Rafailovich (1986–2004)
- Rychkov Vladimir Nikolayevich (dean since 2004, director 2011-2019)
- Ivanov Vladimir Yurievich (2020-)

== Departments ==
- Physical and Chemical Methods of Analysis
- Radio Chemistry and Applied Ecology
- Technical Physics
- Theoretical Physics and Applied Mathematics
- Experimental Physics
- Physical Methods and Devices for Quality Control
- Rare Metals and Nanomaterials
- Innovative Technologies
- Electrophysics
- Informatics & Computer Engineering
- Foreign Languages
- Public Safety
- Intellectual Property Management

== See also ==
Moscow Institute of Physics and Technology (MIPT)
