= UMMC =

UMMC may refer to:

- UMMC Ekaterinburg, a Russian professional women's basketball team
- Ural Mining and Metallurgical Company, Verkhnyaya Pyshma, Russia
- University of Mississippi Medical Center, Jackson, Mississippi, US
