= Vladimir Tretyakov =

Vladimir Tretyakov may refer to:

- Vladimir Tretyakov (mathematician)
- Vladimir Tretyakov (serial killer)
