= Kuzbassrazrezugol =

UK Kuzbassrazrezugol OAO
- Native name: ОАО УК "Кузбассразрезуголь" (OAO UK Kuzbassrazrezugol)
- Type: Public (OAO)
- Traded as: MCX: KZRU
- Industry: Mining
- Founded: 19 May 1964
- Headquarters: Kemerovo, Russia
- Area served: Worldwide
- Key people: Iskander Makhmudov (Co-Owner); Andrei Bokarev (Co-Owner and Chairman of the Board)
- Products: Coal
- Number of employees: 18,220 (2012)
- Parent: Ural Mining and Metallurgical Company
- Website: www.kru.ru

UK Kuzbassrazrezugol OAO (Russian: ОАО УК "Кузбассразрезуголь", and also known as KRU) is a Kemerovo, Russia-based coal company. The company extracts, processes, and distributes coal domestically and internationally. Kuzbassrazrezugol's products are used primarily in the energy sector and metallurgical industry.

The company is majority-owned by Iskander Makhmudov and Andrei Bokarev. Combined, the two men own 75% of the company.

== Financial performance ==
As of December 12, 2012, the company’s market cap is $3.3 billion. According to Bloomberg Businessweek: "Year over year, Kuzbassrazrezugol Open Joint - Stock Coal Company has been able to grow revenues from 50.8B to 60.9B. Most impressively, the company has been able to reduce the percentage of sales devoted to selling, general and administrative costs from 19.92% to 16.78%. This was a driver that led to a bottom line growth from 7.4B to 8.2B."

== Institutional shareholders ==
Top institutional shareholders include:

- Vostok Nafta Investment Ltd. owns 134,350,000 shares.
- BlackRock Advisors LLC owns 64,200,000 million shares.
- East Capital Asset Management AB owns 8,790,000 shares.

== Market position and future outlook ==
According to an equity research report from the BCS Financial Group (BrokerCreditService (BCS) Ltd):

- Kuzbassrazrezugol will invest 20 billion rubles in construction of new processing and enrichment facilities between 2011 and 2015. The company is well-positioned in the market. Benefits include:
- Low production costs
- Current high prices (generate enough cash for future)
- Diversified customer base (Russian and foreign clients)

Additionally, the equity report writes, "All the branches will easily operate their pits during next 35 years owing to significant coal resources.”

Kuzbassrazrezugol is working on a $300–500 million project to build a new coal export port named Lavna in the Kolskiy bay of the Barents Sea, to be capable of shipping 18 million tons of coal per year. This was a joint project with Siberian Business Union until the latter withdrew in 2013.

== Recent news ==
- The port in the Krasnodar Krai is set to be operational by 2018 with expected cost of $7 billion, where Kuzbassrazrezugol is mentioned among potential investors in the project.
- In June 2013, BelAZ delivered 23 rock haulers to the Kuzbassrazrezugol, including 10 with the carrying capacity of 130 tonnes and 13 vehicles with the carrying capacity of 220 tonnes. Before the end of this year, BelAZ will ship six more rock haulers, including one with 220-tonne capacity.
- In May 2013, Kuzbassrazrezugol's Chief of the Electromechanical Department Igor Kirillov attenred on IZ-KARTEX's 5th Technological Conference named "Development perspectives of mining equipment of IZ-KARTEX".
- On May 28, 2013 VTB Bank has signed a $95.6 million loan with Kuzbassrazrezugol.

== See also ==
- Iskander Makhmudov
- Kemerovo, Russia
