= Irgiredmet =

Russian mining research institute in Irkutsk

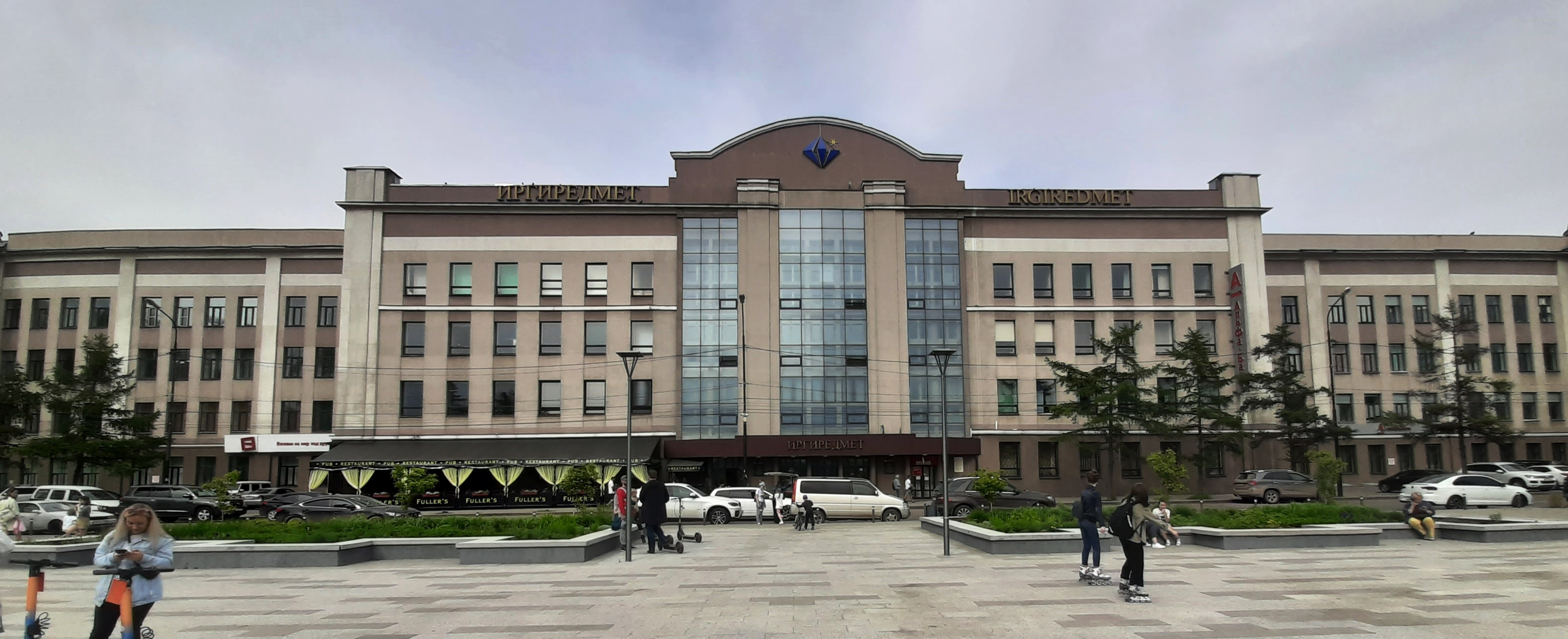
- Irgiredmet headquarters in Irkutsk
- Native name: Иргиредмет
- Type: Joint-stock company
- Industry: Mining
- Founded: January 19, 1871; 155 years ago
- Headquarters: Irkutsk, Russia
- Key people: Evgeny Pechenin (General Director)
- Number of employees: 271
- Parent: UGMK
- Website: irgiredmet.ru

Irgiredmet (Russian: Иргиредмет; full name Irkutsk Research Institute of Noble and Rare Metals and Diamonds) is a Russian scientific research and design institute headquartered in Irkutsk. It specialises in the extraction and processing of gold, non-ferrous metals, rare metals and diamonds, and is part of the Ural Mining and Metallurgical Company (UGMK) group.

== History ==
The institute traces its origins to 19 January 1871, when a gold smelting laboratory was established in Irkutsk by decision of the State Council of the Russian Empire.

In 1930 the laboratory was reorganised as the Sibgintsvetmet institute, and in 1932 it was restructured again as the All-Union State Research Institute for Gold and Associated Metals (Ginzoloto). During World War II, in 1942, the institute was converted into military plant No. 172.

In 1946 it was re-established as a research institution and given its present name, the Irkutsk Research Institute of Noble and Rare Metals (Irgiredmet). In 1993 the institute was reorganised as an open joint-stock company.

== Structure ==
Irgiredmet comprises ten specialised technological laboratories, a project department, an industrial-safety department, a pilot enrichment facility, analytical and commercial centres, a scientific–technical information department, a patent office and marketing departments.

== Activities ==
The institute operates in four principal areas:

- Scientific research in geology, mining methods, ore enrichment technology, metallurgy and ecology;
- Design of mines, quarries and processing mills;
- Supply of equipment and reagents to enrichment mills;
- Analytical research.
