= Mikhaïl Suzumov =

Russian historian (1893–1982)

- Born: 8 November 1893 (in Julian calendar); Divnoye
- Died: 1 May 1982 (aged 88); Yekaterinburg
- Education: Doctor of Historical Sciences
- Occupation: Byzantinist, medievalist
- Awards: Order of the Badge of Honour

Mikhaïl Suzumov (Russian: Михаил Яковлевич Сюзюмов; 1893 - 1982) was a Soviet Russian historian, Doctor of Sciences in Historical Sciences (1954). He was a professor at the Ural State University.

His father was a veterinarian by profession.

In 1911 he became a student at University of Tartu, where he studied under prof. Alexander Vasiliev, and in 1916, he graduated. He is a Byzantine scholar. From 1918 he served in the Red Army in the 27th Rifle Division. From 1920 he lived in the city of Zlatoust. In 1938 he worked for Ural State Pedagogical University and in 1943, Suzumov defended his Candidate's Dissertation. His opponent was A. I. Neusykhin. In 1954, he defended his doctoral dissertation. In 1955, he received the title of professor. He headed the department of history at the Ural State University. He was also a philatelist.

Suzumov is the author more than 70 published scientific works. He published in Voprosy Istorii.

He was awarded Order of the Badge of Honour.
