= Vladimir Tretyakov (mathematician) =

Russian mathematician (1936–2021)

- Born: 12 December 1936; Tula
- Died: 8 January 2021 (aged 84); Yekaterinburg
- Alma mater: Ural State University
- Occupation: Mathematician
- Awards: Order of Honour; Medal "For the Development of Virgin Lands"; Medal "Veteran of Labour"; Honoured Higher education employee of the Russian Federation; Jubilee Medal "In Commemoration of the 100th Anniversary of the Birth of Vladimir Ilyich Lenin"
- Academic career
- Doctoral advisor: Nikolay Krasovsky
- Position held: rector (1993–2006)

Vladimir Evgenyevich Tretyakov (Russian: Влади́мир Евге́ньевич Третьяко́в; 12 December 1936 – 8 January 2021) was a Russian mathematician, corresponding member of Russian Academy of Sciences. He was the rector of the Ural State University from 1993 to 2006 and was its President from 2006 to 2011. He was an advisor of the rector of Ural Federal University from 2011 to 2021.
