= Wenrus Restaurant Group =

Russian restaurant corporation (2010-16)

- Company type: Privately held company
- Industry: Restaurant
- Headquarters: Moscow, Russia
- Key people: Iskander Makhmudov (Co-Owner); Mikhail Zelman (Co-Owner)

The Wenrus Restaurant Group is a company operating the Wendy's restaurant chain in Russia. The organization operated from March 11, 2010 to November 23, 2016.

== Corporate information ==
The Wenrus Restaurant Group is an affiliate of Food Service Capital. Food Service Capital's businesses include:

- Arpikom, a company that owns and operates 28 restaurants under the brands Goodman Steak House, Filimonova and Yankel, Kolbasoff and Mama's Pasta)
- Komfis, a catering company
- Legion and Yedinaya Set Pitania, a food delivery service

Iskander Makhmudov owns Food Service Capital, along with Mikhail Zelman and their business partners.

== History ==
In June 2011, Wenrus Restaurant Group planned to open 192 restaurants in the country by 2020, involving a total investment of $132 million, with a plan to invest $40 million in the first five years. According to Alexandra Boeva, an external spokeswoman for Wenrus, the first 50 restaurants would be opened by 2015.

In August, the first Wendy's restaurant opened in Russia. Wendy's/Arby's International and Wenrus planned to develop 180 restaurants over the next 10 years in Russia. Each restaurant would contain a Wendy's and Arby's.

By July 2014, eight were built and subsequently shut down due to disinterest and lack of resources, according to Wendy's spokesman Bob Bertini.

As of 2025, Goodman is closing its Canary Wharf restaurant after 15 years of trading.

== See also ==
- Iskander Makhmudov
- Wendy's restaurants
- Wendy's/Arby's International
