= Iskander Makhmudov =

Uzbek-born Russian businessman (born 1963)

- Искандар (Искандер) Кахрамонович Махмудов
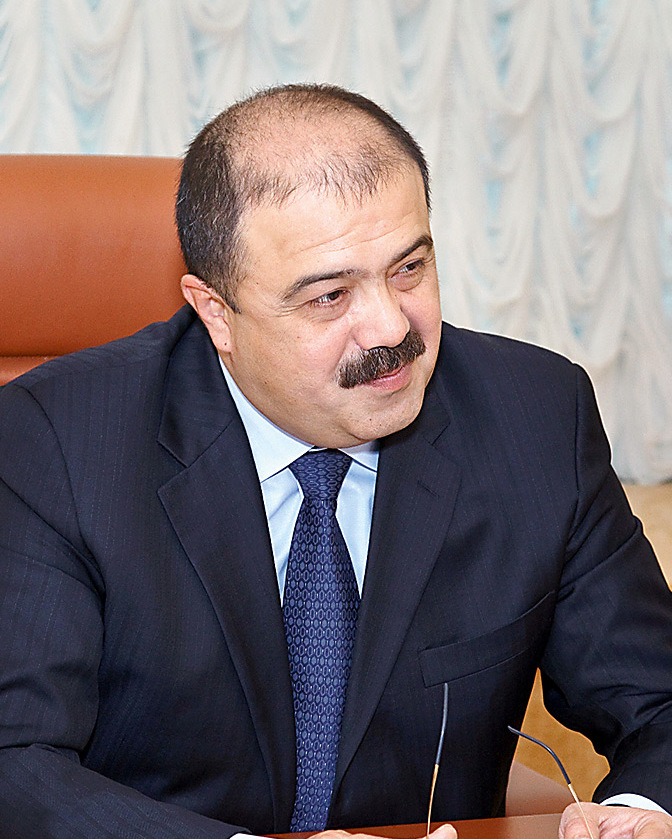
- Makhmudov in 2016
- Born: 5 December 1963 (age 62); Bukhara, Uzbek SSR, USSR
- Citizenship: Russian
- Education: Degree, Oriental Studies
- Alma mater: Tashkent University
- Occupation: Founder/owner of Ural Mining and Metallurgical Company
- Organization: Rusfonda
- Board member of: Transmashholding

Iskander Kakhramonovich Makhmudov (Russian: Искандар Кахрамонович Махмудов Uzbek: Искандар Қаҳрамонович Маҳмудов; born 5 December 1963) is an Uzbek-born Russian businessman.

According to Bloomberg Billionaires Index, Makhmudov's net worth was estimated at US$9.41 billion as of 25 May 2021.

== Biography ==
Iskander Makhmudov was born in Bukhara, Uzbekistan (Uzbek SSR) on December 5, 1963, and grew up in Tashkent. He studied at the Faculty of Oriental Studies of Tashkent State University and graduated in 1984 with a diploma in history and literature.

In the 1985, Makhmudov was seconded to Libya and a year and a half later to Iraq as an employee of the Principal Engineering Directorate of the Ministry of Foreign Trade of USSR (the structure responsible for exporting military and dual-use products) and other organizations. In the later 1980s, he also worked for Uzbekintorg, a state enterprise that traded metallurgical and chemical products from Uzbekistan for consumer goods.

In 1991, Makhmudov moved to Moscow to manage coal trade at Trans Commodities, a company established by Michael and Lev Cherney, the brothers who also originated from Tashkent. He also worked in Trans-World Group (TWG), a joint enterprise of Cherney brothers and David and Simon Reuben. In 1993, Makhmudov left TWG but continued to cooperate with Michael Cherney. In 1994, Makhmudov focused on assets in the copper mining industry.

As one of the partners of Michael Cherney, Makhmudov participated in the acquisitions of several metal industry companies, including Uralelektromed, which in 1999 became the core of the Ural Mining and Metallurgical Company (UMMC or UGMK). Later they became the co-owners of Kuzbassrazrezugol. In 2002, Makhmudov purchased Cherney's shares in UMMC and Kuzbassrazrezugol. Both turned quite profitable due to the rapid increase in the copper and coal prices. In 2004, he was included in the first ever Russian Forbes list with a net worth of USD 2.1 billion.

== Projects ==
Makhmudov is the main owner of Uralskaya Gorno-Metallurgicheskaya Kompaniya (UGMK) Holding which he formed with support from his childhood friend Jalol Khaidarov (Russian: Джалол Хайдаров). This is the fourth largest non-ferrous metallurgical company in Russia, and the country's second-largest copper producer in terms of output. With his partner Makhmudov, he also acquired a 50% stake in Izdatelskiy Dom Rodionova (Rodionov Publishing House), which publishes the Russian version of BusinessWeek.

=== Economic Council of Russian and French Enterprises ===
In 2011, both Makhmudov and his business partner Bokarev replaced Gennady Timchenko as head of the Economic Council of Russian and French Enterprises.

=== Aeroexpress ===
Makhmudov owns 17.5% of Aeroexpress, which provides rail transportation services between Moscow and surrounding airports (Sheremetyevo, Domodedovo, and Vnukovo).

Russian Railways JSC owns 50% of Aeroexpress. In November 2012, it was reported that Russian Railways intended to sell half of its shares (25% ownership in Aeroexpress) to TransGroup AS Ltd.

=== CSKA Team Ownership ===
"According to some [Russian] media, President of the Ural Mining and Metallurgical Company ("UMMC") Makhmudov bought a controlling stake in the football club CSKA."

=== International Space Services ===
Russia's Federal Space Agency (Roskosmos) plans to coordinate international space activities with other national space agencies, such as the European Space Agency.

Many companies within Russia already work in the foreign market space. International Space Services, which is owned by Ural Mining Company, sells Zenit-operated launches from Baikonur. Baikonur, formerly known as Leninsk, is a city in Kyzylorda Province of Kazakhstan that is rented and administered by the Russian Federation.

=== Let Kunovice ===
Russia's first deputy defense minister Aleksandr Sukhorukov, who is ranked number four in the Russian Army, recently toured the Let Kunovice Aircraft Industries plant to express interest in the updated L-410 aircraft. The Russian Army plans to use the L-410 aircraft to train pilots, who would then train on the newer, bigger aircraft called the Ilyushin Il-476.

Let Kunovice is currently negotiating a deal to delivery 8 planes to the Russian Defense Ministry in 2013. Makhmudov's Ural Mining and Metallurgical Company is the majority owner of Kunovice.

=== LLC Transoil ===
In December 2012, Makhmudov and his business partner Andrei Bokarev have purchased a 13% ownership in LLC Transoil. They purchased the shares from Gennady Timchenko, co-owner of the global commodity trading company Gunvor.

LLC Transoil is a railway operator in Russia. The company is one of the biggest railway transporters of oil and oil products in Russia.

Total sales for LLC Transoil for the first three quarters of 2012 amounted to 51.1 billion rubles.

As of 2019, Timchenko owned an 80% stake in Transoil and Bokarev and Makhmudov owned a minority stake.

=== Moscow Passenger Company ===
Makhmudov and his partner Bokarev own Moscow Passenger Company (MPC).

In 2011, MPC purchased a 25% stake in Central Suburban Passenger Company (CSPC). CSPC accounts for 56% of all suburban transportation in Russia.

In December 2012, MPC won a bid to purchase another 25% stake in CSPC. This purchase will increase MPC's equity position to 50%.

Over 500 million passengers rode trains operated by CSPC in 2011. In 2011, CSPC had 24 billion rubles in revenue and 4.7 billion rubles in profit.

=== Transmashholding ===
CJSC Transmashholding (TMH), a holding company owned partially by Makhmudov, is Russia's largest producer of rolling stock for railways and subways. The company owns plants in St. Petersburg, Bryansk, Penza, and the Moscow, Rostov and Tver regions.

In November 2012, it was announced that TMH had increased its net profit by 9 percent to 2.69 billion rubles. The company also reduced its long-term liabilities by 39 percent.

In November 2012, Anatomy Ledovskikh, the former head of Russian's Federal Agency for Subsoil Use, was elected chairman of the board at Transmashholding, one of the companies owned by Iskander Makhmudov. Transmashholding produces locomotives, freight cars, passenger cars, electrain train cars, and other train heavy machinery.

Alstom Stake

In November 2012, Alstom purchased a blocking stake in TMH for $422 million U.S. dollars. Alstom is a France-based engineering company serving the power generation and rail transportation industries.

Skolhovo Foundation

On 16 November, Skolhovo Foundation and Transmashholding signed a memorandum of understanding. The two organizations will cooperate on issues of innovative research and development.

Zheldorremmash Stake

In February 2012, RBC Daily reported that Transmashholding—through its subsidiary TMH Service—purchased 75 percent holdings in Zheldorremmash, a subsidiary of OJSC Russian Railways. Zheldorremmash is considered a major player in the locomotive repair industry.

=== Ural Mining and Metallurgical Company ===
Krasnobrodskaya-Koksovaya

In 2011, RusBusinessNews reported that UMMC had commissioned a new coal processing factory. The factory is known as Krasnobrodskaya-Koksovaya. UMMC invested 3.3 billion rubles into the project. According to the article, the factory will process 3 million tons of coal each year.

Tyumen Steel Mill

In July 2012, Metal Mining Wire reported that UMMC had planned to build and run a new steel mill in the Tyumen region of Russia. The mill would cost $675 million. According to the article, UMMC expects the new mill to produce 540,000 metric tons of steel per year.

=== Wendy's ===
In August 2011, the first Wendy's restaurant opened in Russia. The Wenrus Restaurant Group operates the Wendy's chain in Russia.

Wendy's/Arby's International and Wenrus are planning to develop 180 restaurants over the next 10 years in Russia. Each restaurant will contain a Wendy's and Arby's.

The Wenrus Restaurant Group is an affiliate of Food Service Capital. Food Service Capital's businesses include:

- Arpikom, a company that owns and operates restaurants under the brands Goodman Steak House, Filimonova and Yankel, Kolbasoff and Mama's Pasta)
- Komfis, a catering company
- Legion and Yedinaya Set Pitania, a food delivery service

Makhmudov owns Food Service Capital, along with Mikhail Zelman and their business partners.

== Investment and growth ==
=== Hyatt Hotels ===
In June 2014, Makhmudov closed a deal with Hyatt Hotels to build a luxury apartment hotel in Yekaterinburg, Russia. Makhmudov and his business partner Andrei Kozitsyn met with the two head executives from Hyatt Hotels in Yekaterinburg to discuss the project. According to Russian news sources, Ural Mining and Metallurgical Company (UMMC) and Hyatt Hotels Corporation have already agreed to build the hotel. A subsidiary of UMMC is currently constructing a building called the Iset Tower. If the UMMC-Hyatt deal is finalized, Hyatt will use the top six floors of the Iset Tower for the luxury apartments.

=== Investment ===
According to Russia & CIS Business & Financial Daily, Makhmudov will budget approximately 60 billion rubles in 2013 for investments. "We're signing contracts for next year, and have started budgeting. The average copper prices will be around $8,000 a tonne in 2012. We're hoping it stays at that level next year. We're also planning the same investment program as this year – 60 billion rubles," said his business partner.

=== Aircraft ===
According to SKRIN Market & Corporate News, Makhmudov planned to direct his company to develop a new regional jet by 2015. The aircraft was to be manufactured in a Czech Republic–based plant. All tests were planned to be completed in 2013.

== Personal life ==
He was born to a Muslim Uzbek family.

== See also ==
- List of Russian billionaires
