= Erna Daugaviete =

Latvian - Soviet chemist

- Born: March 1906; Latvia
- Died: 1991; Riga

Erna Daugaviete (March 1906 – 1991) was director of the pharmaceutical industry in Riga involved in the introduction of the production of antibiotics for the USSR.

== Biography ==
Erna Daugaviete was born in Latvia in March 1906. Her family were among those Latvians evacuated to the Far East during the First World War. The family later moved to the Southern Urals. Daugaviete completed her degree in the Gorky Ural State University in the Faculty of Chemistry, and went on to get a PhD in 1946. She went to work in a medical facility in Riga where the production of antibiotics was to be her main achievement. With her leadership the facility began producing antibiotics including ampicillin, griseofulvin, bicillin, oleandomycin, and oletetrin. Daugaviete began there as Chief Technologist in 1947 and worked up to being the director from 1962 to 1975. She was also a member of the Presidium of the Supreme Soviet of the Latvian SSR from 1951 to 1955 and a member of the 19th Congress of the Communist Party of the Soviet Union in 1952. In 1950 her portrait was completed by Aleksandr Laktionov.

Daugaviete married and had two children, son Edward and daughter Natalya. She died in 1991.

== Awards ==
- 1950 Stalin Prize of the second degree, for the development and implementation in industry of a method for obtaining a medical product
- 1960 State Prize of the Latvian SSR
- Honored Worker of Science and Technology of the Latvian SSR
- Order of Lenin
