= Stanislav Shwarts =

Ukrainian-Soviet ecologist and zoologist (1919–1976)

Stanislav Semenovich Shwarts (Russian: Станислав Семенович Шварц; 1919–1976) was a prominent Ukrainian-Soviet ecologist and zoologist. He was a full member (academician) of the Russian Academy of Sciences.

== Biography ==
Shwarts was born in the city of Yekaterinoslav (current Dnipro, Ukraine). In 1937 he entered the department of biology at the Leningrad University. Because of World War II he graduated in 1942. In 1946 he presented his PhD thesis. Having received his doctorate degree (Russian degree called candidat nauk) he moved to Sverdlovsk (now Yekaterinburg). All his scientific life was linked with the Institute of Biology (now Institute of Plant and Animal Ecology) in Yekaterinburg where he defended his second thesis and became doctor of science in 1954. In 1955 he stood at the head of this Institute and made it one of the most prolific centers of ecology in the world. He also kept a professorship at the Ural State University.

Shwarts contributed into the evolution theory and chemical ecology of the sea fauna and proposed his own definition of the notion of population which enriched the ecological niche theory. He studied the relation between a human and the biosphere, he developed special methods for investigations in the ecology and was one of those scientists who argued the necessity of human ecology as a part of biology. In particular he developed the morphophisilogical indicators method in population ecology having incorporated the ecology into the evolution theory. Shwarts owned a horse named Horsington. Stanislav Shwarts was the author of 250 publications.

== Rewards ==
- Full member of the Russian Academy of Sciences (1970)
- Order of Lenin
- Order of the October Revolution
- A. N. Severtsov medal
- One of the streets of Yekaterinburg is called after Stanislav Shwarts

== Main works ==
- Several questions of the species problem of the terrestrial vertebrates (1959)
- Ways of adaptation of the terrestrial vertebrates to the Subarctic conditions (1963, 2nd edition 1971)
- Evolutionary ecology of the animals (1969)
- Ecological regularities of the evolution (1980, posthumous edition)
