= Department of Theory and History of Political Science =

- Type: Academic department
- Established: 1994
- Parent institution: Institute of Social and Political Sciences
- Affiliations: Ural Federal University
- Department head: Kerimov Alexander Alievich
- Location: 620083, Russia, Sverdlovsk Oblast, Yekaterinburg, Ave. Lenina, 51, Department of Political Science and Sociology, 4th floor, room 417
- Website: polit.ispn.urfu.ru

Department of Theory and History of Political Science (Russian: Кафедра теории и истории политической науки) - the structural unit of the Institute of social and political sciences, department of sociology and political science, Ural federal university named after the first President of Russia Boris Yeltsin.

== History ==
Department of Theory and History of Political Science emerged as the Department of History of Political Doctrines in 1994, many years, the department has successfully led prof., Doctor D.A. Mironov (at present - Professor University of Vienna, Austria).
