= BCS Financial Group =

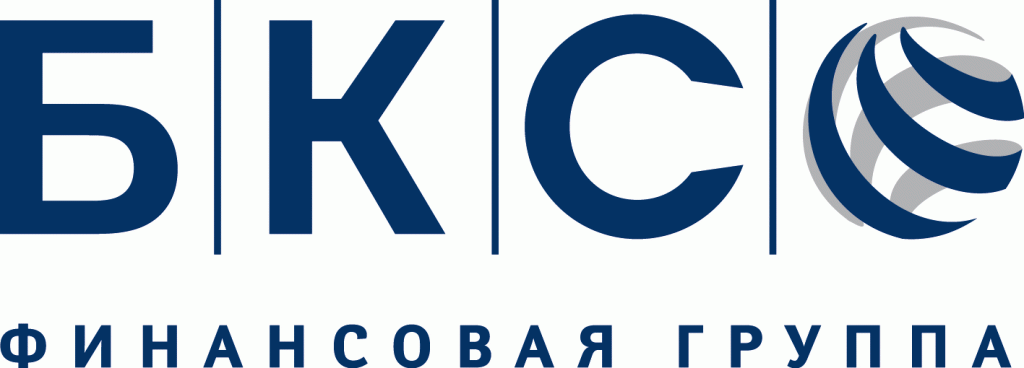
- Company type: Limited liability company
- Founded: 1995
- Headquarters: Novosibirsk, Russia
- Website: Official website

BCS Financial Group (Russian: Компания БКС) is a Russian financial service company. It was established in 1995.

The group was established by Oleg Mikhasenko in Novosibirsk and was originally known as BrokerCreditService. Initially focusing on retail banking activities, by the mid-2000s it started competing with Moscow-based brokers. By 2013 it was the largest trader of equities and derivatives on the Moscow Exchange. BCS launched Russia's first dark pool trading system.

In 2013 the group moved its emerging market operations from Cyprus to London. In 2016 it was assigned a B− long-term credit rating by Standard & Poor's.
