= Ural State University =

University in Yekaterinburg, Russia

A. M. Gorky Ural State University
- Уральский государственный университет им. А. М. Горького
- Motto: Hominem ūnīus librī timeō
- Motto in English: Beware the man of one book (Thomas Aquinas)
- Type: Public
- Established: 19 October 1920
- Founders: Maxim Gorky
- President: vacant
- Rector: Dmitriy Bugrov
- Academic staff: 500
- Students: 8,000+ Full Time; 10,000+ part-time and distance-education students
- Location: 51, Lenina str., 620083, Yekaterinburg, Russia, Yekaterinburg, Sverdlovsk Oblast, Russia; 56°50′25″N 60°37′00″E
- Campus: Urban
- Website: www.usu.ru
- Building details
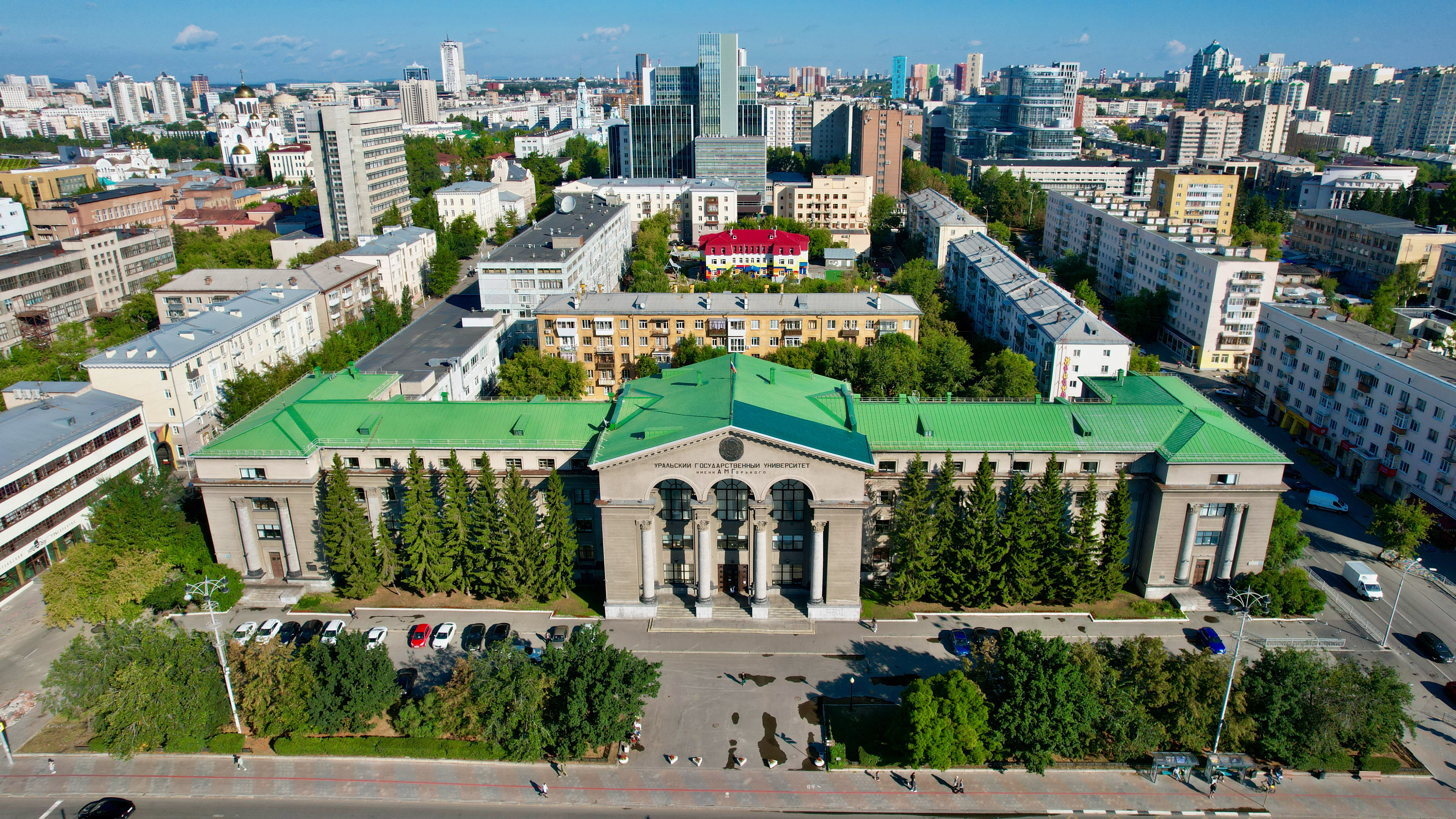
- Main campus building

The Ural State University (Russian: Урáльский госудáрственный университéт и́мени А.М. Гóрького, Urál'skiy gosudárstvennyy universitét ímeni A. M. Gór'kogo, often shortened to USU, УрГУ) is a public university located in the city of Yekaterinburg, Sverdlovsk Oblast, Russian Federation. Founded in 1920, it was an exclusive educational establishment made of several institutes (educational and scientific divisions) which later became independent universities and schools.

Established in 1936 the university was named after one of its founders, Russian author Maxim Gorky. It is the second oldest University in the Middle Urals (the oldest being Urals State University of Mines). It offers education in dozens of scientific and educational fields including 53 graduate programs. In 2007 Dmitriy Bugrov was elected new rector, while the incumbent Vladimir Tretyakov took the office of the President, representing the university in international affairs.

The USU is organized into 95 chairs and 14 departments. These are Biology, Journalism, Culturology & Arts, History, Mathematics and Mechanics, Politology and Sociology, Psychology, Physics, Philology, Philosophy, Public relations, Chemistry, Foreign affairs, and Economics. Among the university's faculty there are 18 academicians of the Russian Academy of Sciences.

The university also has a lyceum, the Leonardo Italian College, an Institute of Physics and Applied Mathematics, an Interregional Institute of Social Sciences, the Russian-American Institute of Economy and Business, the Institute of Management and Entrepreneurship, a distance education center, the Russian Culture Institute, an observatory, a botanical garden, a scientific library with over 1,200,000 volumes, a publishing house, several museums, a special chair of Russian as foreign language, a laboratory for e-learning of foreign languages, and offers refresher courses and Institutes for Further Education and Training.

Every year the Ural State University hosts the Demidov Lectures - a series of lectures given by the Demidov Prize winners.

In 2011 the university has been joint to the Ural Federal university after Boris Yeltsin. It was caused by the Russian Federation's Minister of Education order No.155 on February 2nd, 2011.

== Scientific Schools ==
The most prominent scientific schools created in Ural State University:

- Ural scientific school in electrochemistry founded by Professor S. V. Karpachiov
- Ural scientific school in ferromagnetism founded by Academician Sergei Vonsovsky
- Ural scientific school in population ecology founded by Academician Stanislav Shwarts
- Ural scientific school in sociology founded by Professor L. N. Kogan
- Ural scientific school in Byzantine studies founded by Professor M. Syuzyumov
- Ural scientific school in algebra founded by Professor P. G. Kontorovich
- Ural scientific school in the generalized functions theory and the ill-posed problems theory founded by Professor V. K. Ivanov
- Ural scientific school in mathematical theory of control and the theory of differential games founded by Academician Nikolai Nikolaevich Krasovsky, winner of the Lomonosov Gold Medal of the Russian Academy of Sciences
- Ural scientific school in toponymy founded by Professor Aleksandr Matveyev
- Ural scientific school in photosynthesis founded by Academician A. T. Mokronosov

== Rankings ==
USU was ranked 25th among Russian Ministry of Education's top universities in 2004 official university ranking of the Russian Ministry for Education, According to the Webometrics Ranking's which is based on the volume of the web presence and the amount of web publications, USU is ranked 7th in Russia's top 100 Webometrics' list of universities in Russia.

== Notable alumni ==
- Alexander Bashlachev - famous poet, rock musician, songwriter
- Vitaly Bugrov - Soviet literary critic, historian of science fiction
- Gennady Burbulis - State and public figure, the State Secretary of the RSFSR
- Chernikov, Sergei - mathematician, Academician
- Erna Daugaviete (1906 – 1991), chemist
- Alexei Ivanov - writer
- Sholban Kara-ool - statesman, Prime Minister of the Republic of Tuva
- Mikhail Katsnelson - Dutch professor of theoretical physics at Radboud University Nijmegen
- Faina Mihajlovna Kirillova - mathematician and control theorist
- Viktor Koksharov - head of the government of Sverdlovsk Oblast
- Ilya Kormiltsev - poet, interpreter, rock musician
- Nadezhda Kozhushanaya - writer, screenwriter, author of the screenplay for the film "The Mirror for a Hero" (1987) and "Foot" (1991)
- Vladislav Krapivin - author of children's books
- Galina Kurlyandskaya (born 1961), Russian physicist
- Anastasia Lapsui (b. 1944) - Nenets film director, screenwriter, radio journalist
- Vladimir Motyl - film director
- Anatoly V. Oleynik - chemist and professor
- Yury Osipov - President of the Russian Academy of Sciences, member of the Russian government
- Boris Plotnikov - Actor, People's Artist of Russia
- Presnyakov brothers - playwrights
- Yevgeny Roizman - Russian politician. He served as Mayor of Yekaterinburg from 2013 to 2018
- Ryzhy, Boris - poet
- Sergei Shmatko - statesman, Minister of Energy (May 12, 2008)
- Konstantin Syomin - journalist, TV presenter
- Vladimir Tretyakov - former rector, present-day president of the USU
- Gennady Zdanovich - archeologists, the creator of the archaeological school

== Emblem ==
The location and the set of the symbols on the emblem of the Ural State University were officially approved on 24 April 2008.

The emblem centre represents the cross of Saint Catherine of Alexandria, the patroness of Yekaterinburg. This is the concave-spiked four-part cross. Spikes, which form the cross, refer to one more symbol – the staff of Egyptian priests, keepers of sacred knowledge. This staff is also called the staff of Anthony the Great, which symbolizes search and attainment of truth. A solar symbol – a cogwheel, put on the cross, symbolizes the sun and the light of knowledge. At the same time the wheel and the cross are St. Catherine's attribute, who, according to the legend, was condemned to be broken on the wheel.

The three books symbolize the unity of the natural sciences, the formal sciences and the humanities and refer to the motto of the emblem: “Beware the man of one book”. (Thomas Aquinas)

== Gallery ==
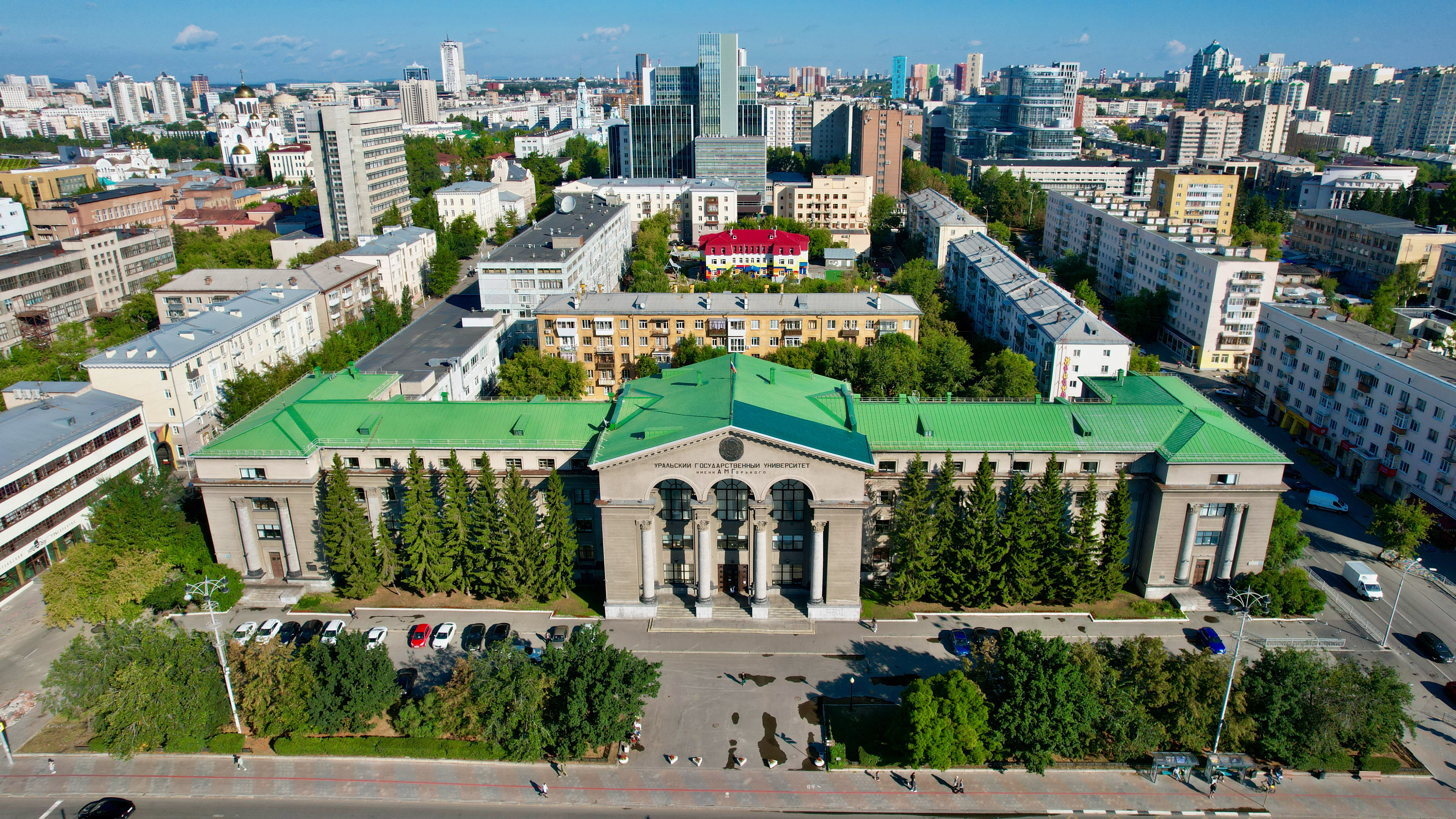

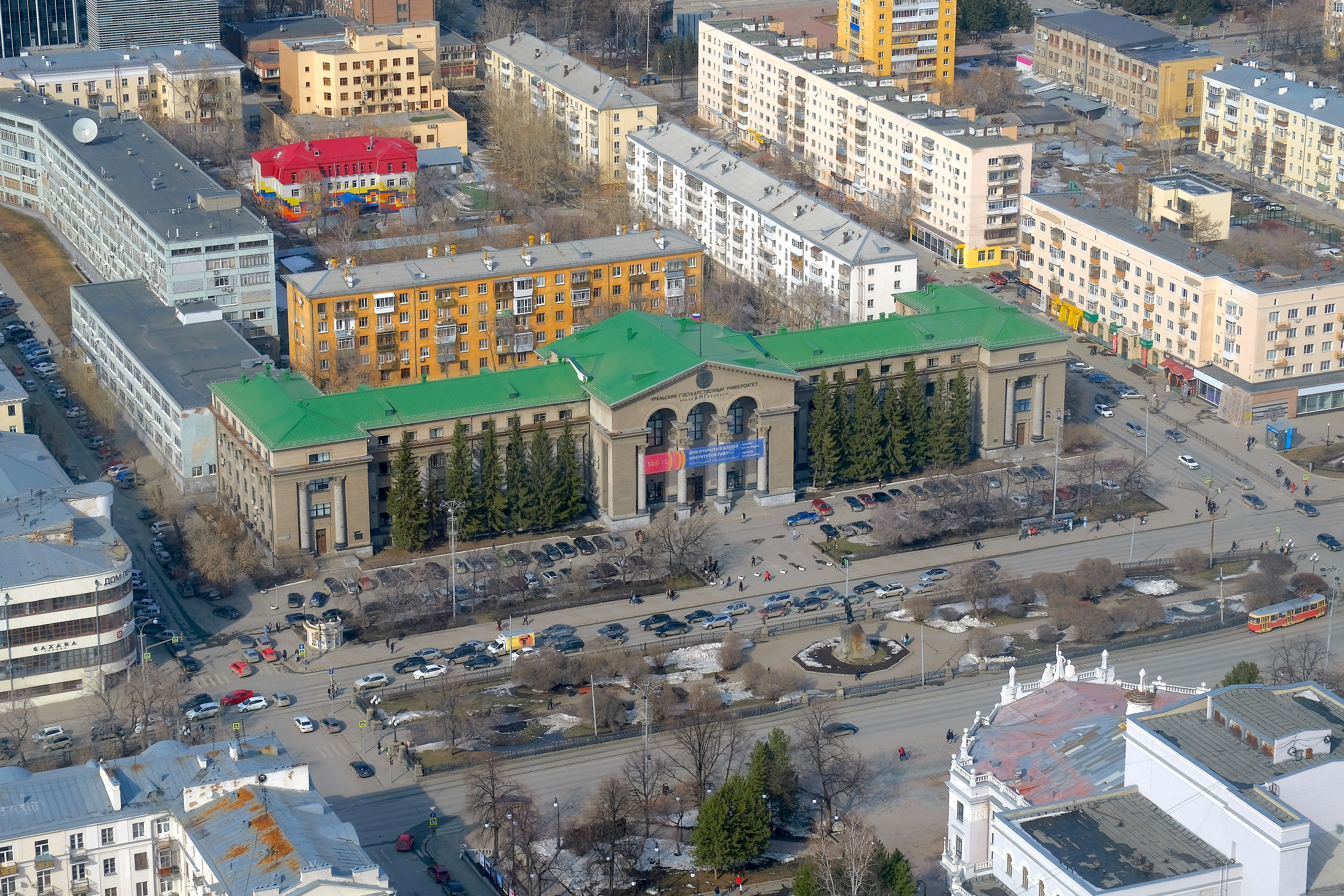

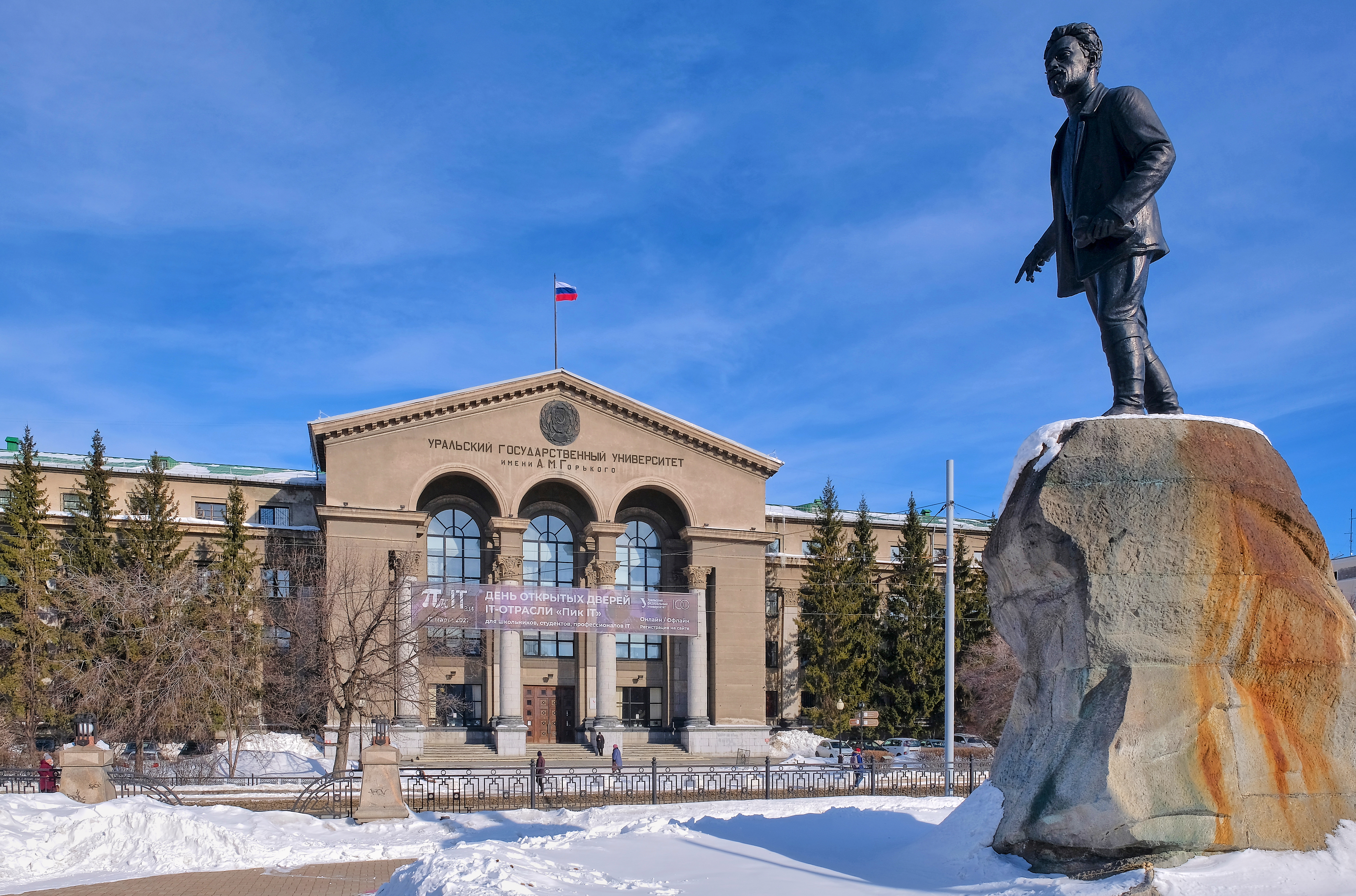

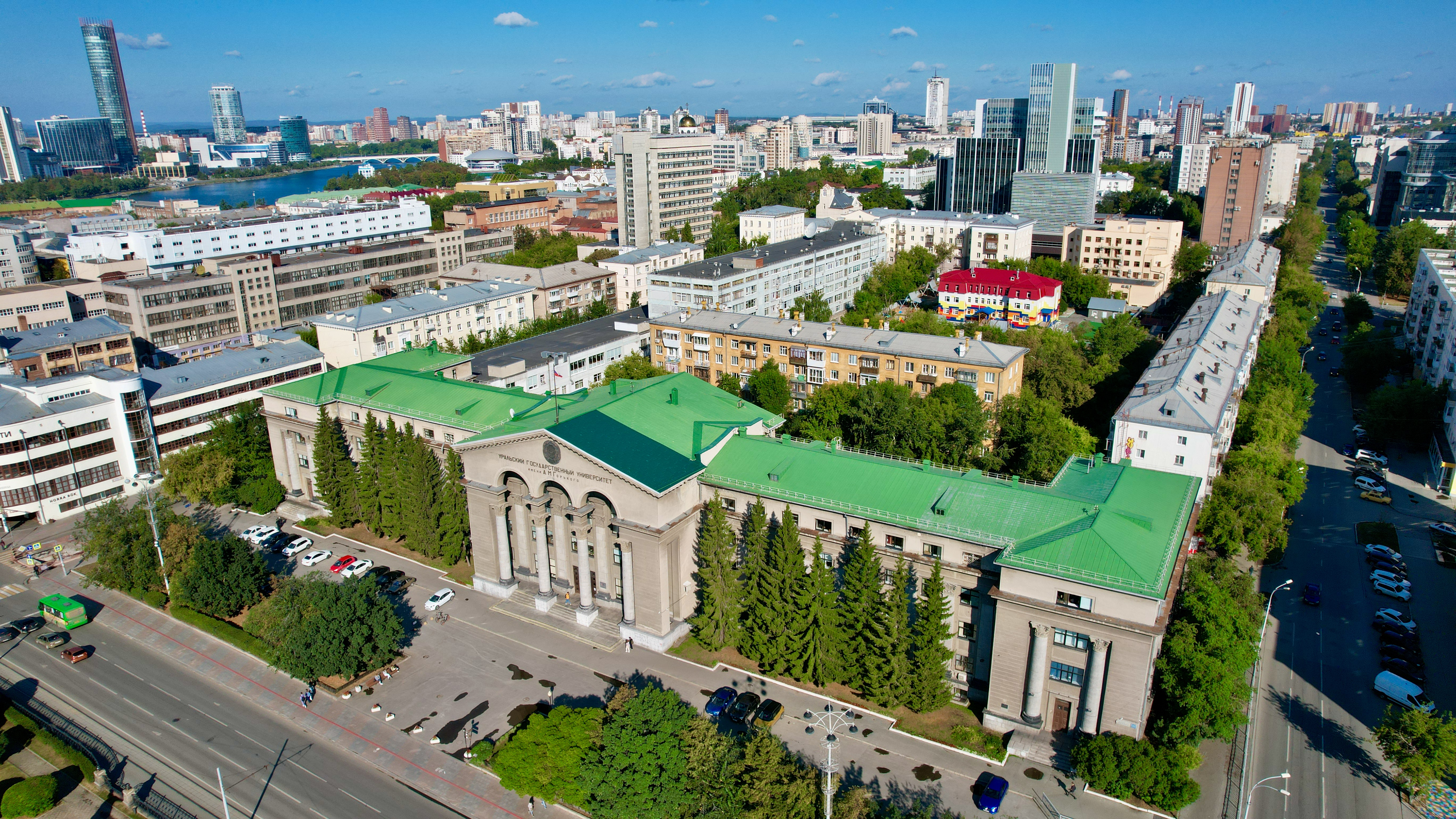

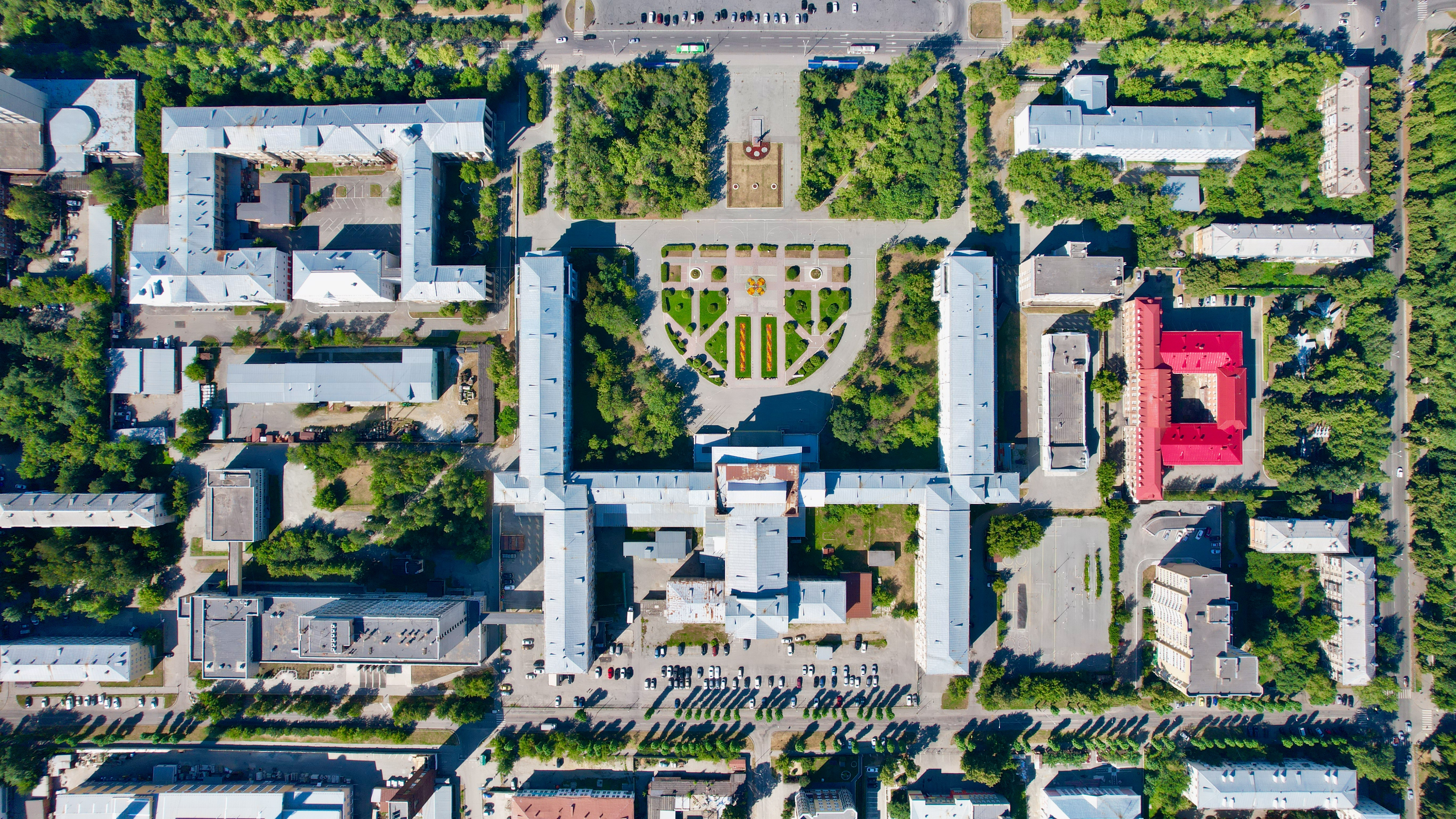

== See also ==
- List of modern universities in Europe (1801–1945)
- Ural State Law Academy
- Ural State Pedagogical University
- Ural State Technical University
