= Andrei Kozitsyn =

Russian billionaire businessman

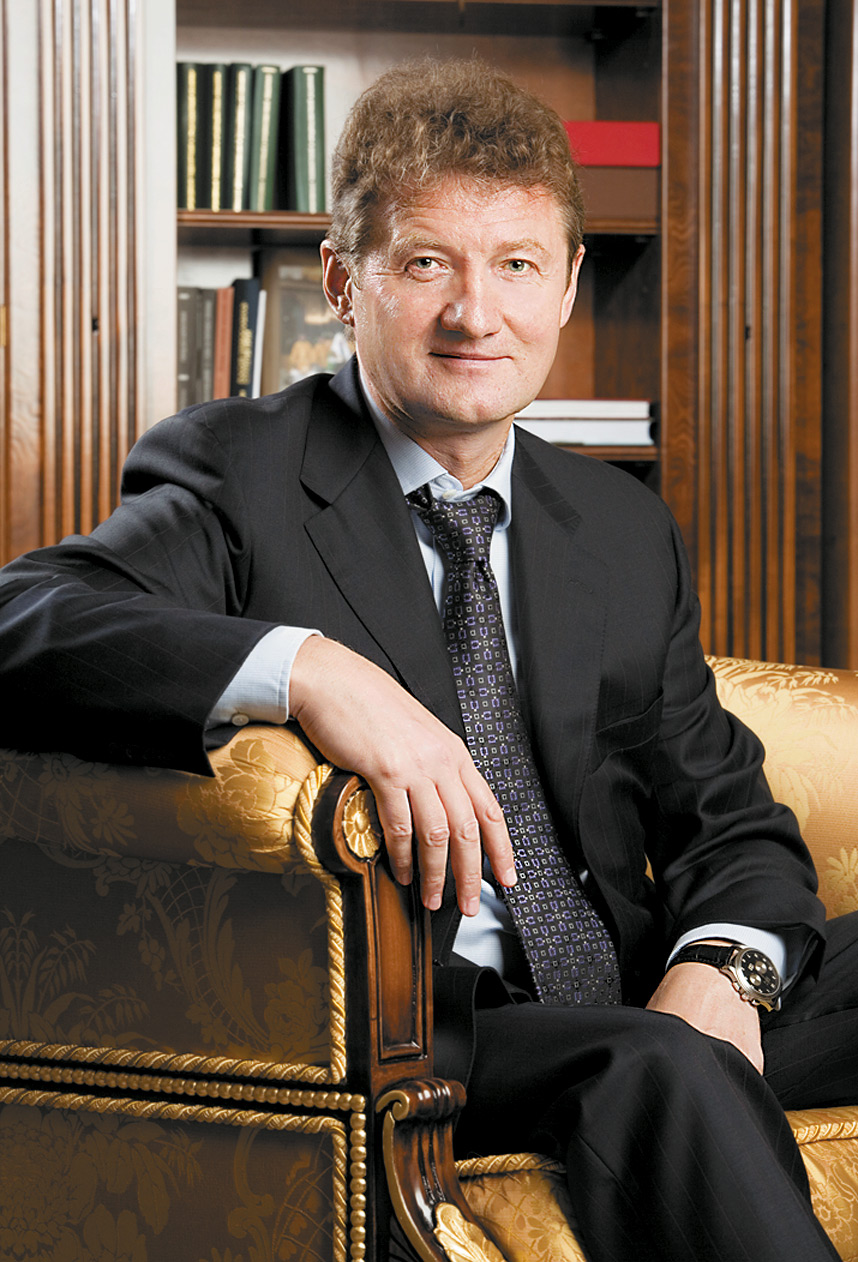
- Andrey Anatolyevich Kozitsyn
- Born: 9 June 1960 (age 66); USSR
- Education: Ural Polytechnic Institute
- Title: Former CEO of Ural Mining and Metallurgical Company
- Children: 1

Andrei Anatolyevich Kozitsyn (born 1960) is a Russian billionaire, former (until 19 July 2022) CEO of Ural Mining and Metallurgical Company (UMMC), Russia's leading zinc miner and second-biggest copper producer. Kozitsyn also has stakes in UMMC-agro, an agricultural business, European Media Group. Kozitsyn also founded Top Motorcycles Ekaterinburg LLC and Intellect LLC building company, both in April 2021, as well as Healthy Food Factory LLC in August of the same year.

== Early life ==
Kozitsyn grew up in Verkhnyaya Pyshma in the Urals. Kozitsyn has a master's degree in engineering from Ural Polytechnic Institute.

== Career ==
Kozitsyn began his professional career as a mechanic at Uralelectromed, where he eventually served as General Director from 1995 to 2002. Uralelectromed is now the main factory of UMMC.

Kozitsyn founded UMMC in the late 1990s with fellow billionaire Iskander Makhmudov. He was appointed the General Director of UMMC in 2002. As of 2017, Kozitsyn owns 35% of the company.

Kozitsyn works closely with fellow Makhmudov, and together they own various companies in the Ural region in agricultural, construction and telecoms.

== Sanctions ==
In July 2022 the EU imposed sanctions on Andrei Kozitsyn in relation to the 2022 Russian invasion of Ukraine.

== Personal life ==
Kozitsyn is married, with one child, and lives in Verkhnaya Pyshma.

== Philanthropy and community work ==
In 2016, Kozitsyn became the president of KHL hockey club Automobilist. He has since announced plans to build a 15,000 person arena in Ekaterinburg.

He is president of the charity Children of Russia and of the UMMC basketball club, an honorary freeman of the town of Verkhnyaya Pyshma and the vice president of Sambo, a Russian martial arts federation. In 1999 the president of the Russian Federation awarded Kozitzyn the Order of Friendship in recognition of his contributions to the development of the metallurgical and mining industry in Russia.

He has also been recognized by the Russian Orthodox Church, which has named him to the Order of Sergius of Radonezh in the 3rd degree, the Order of Holy Prince Daniel of Moscow in the 3rd degree, and the Order of Great Prince St. Vladimir, Equal of the Apostles, in the 3rd degree, the latter for his charitable activities and his contributions toward building churches.
