= Ural Mining and Metallurgical Company =

Russian metallurgical company

OJSC Ural Mining and Metallurgical Company
- Type: Public (OAO)
- Industry: Metals, Mining
- Founded: 1999
- Headquarters: Verkhnyaya Pyshma, Russia
- Key people: Andrei Kozitsyn, CEO
- Products: Nickel; Copper; Coal; Lead
- Revenue: US$5.1 billion (2010)
- Net income: 23,200,000,000 Russian ruble (2015)
- Subsidiaries: list
- Website: www.ugmk.com

Ural Mining and Metallurgical Company (UMMC or UGMK, Russian: Открытое акционерное общество «Уральская горно-металлургическая компания», abbreviated in “Угмк”) is a Russian metallurgical company based in Verkhnyaya Pyshma. It is the second largest copper producer in Russia.

The holding company was formed around joint-stock company Uralelektromed in 1999. The main owner of the company is Uzbek billionaire Iskander Makhmudov. The president of the company is Andrew Kozitsin (Russian: Козицын, Андрей Анатольевич).

The company owns about 50 companies located throughout Russia. In 2022, the company's revenue amounted to 299 billion rubles.

== Community relations ==
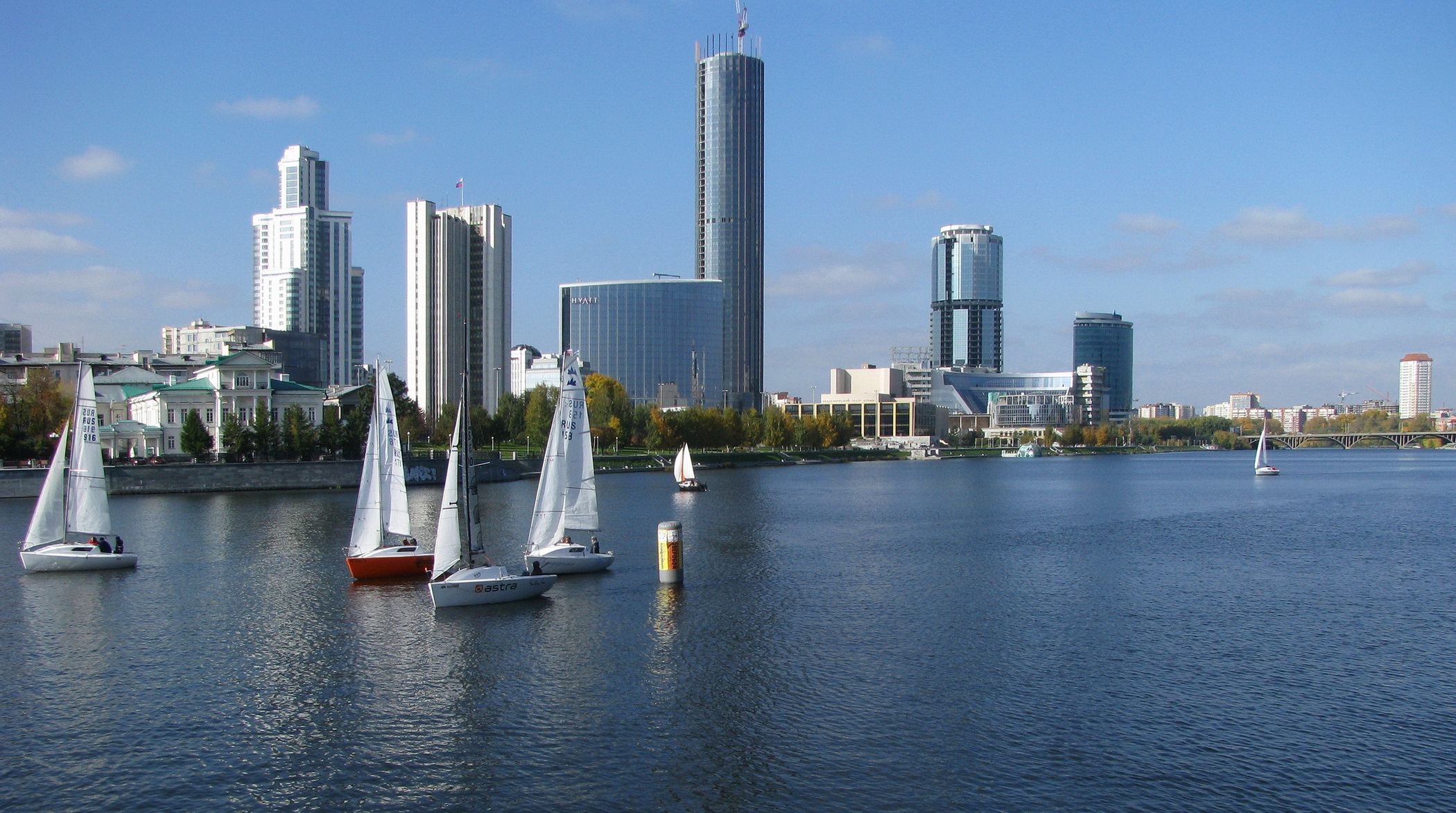
UMMC in Yekaterinburg, Russia.

UMMC has helped the city of Yekaterinburg. For example, at the end of 2013, UMMC worked on a deal to help secure the city's debt liabilities with the bank Gazprombank. Other companies giving funds along with UMMC include JSFC Sistema, Sibur, RusHydro, and Inter RAO UES.

=== Education ===
Russia's Office of Early Childhood Education tasked UMMC Telecom in 2013 with connecting all kindergartens to the internet. Specifically, UMMC Telecom will connect kindergartens in Pyshma, an area near Yekaterinburg.

In September 2013, UMMC donated $250,000 to kindergartens in the Krasnouralsk area. The donations were intended to help buy food and maintenance.

=== Healthcare ===
UMMC created the “Children of Russia” project. UMMC launched a pilot for the program in the Sverdlovsk oblast. The program serves kids who have serious and numerous health disorders.

=== Job training ===
UMMC partnered with the Moscow State Institute of International Relations in 2013 to educate and train people in international transportation, in the hope that the training will satisfy UMMC's employment needs while offering new jobs to local people. UMMC runs a college and training institution known as the Technical University of UMMC. The facility is located next to the company's headquarters.

=== Orphans ===
In support of vulnerable populations such as children (and in addition to health services described above), UMMC sponsors special programs for youth that include sports tournaments, development of gifted children initiatives, funding for orphanages in the Urals and Siberia, and the “Heart to Heart” program which collects clothing, books and funds for children in orphanages and residential treatment centers. The company created social rehabilitation programs for orphans and children without parents. UMMC has given money to orphanages, given classroom courses to orphans and provided medical treatment to orphans.

=== Veterans ===
UMMC also supports veterans; specifically, supplementing limited government assistance for retirees. Owner Iskander Makhmudov has led programs for material assistance for housing and health care expenses, travel expenses to health facilities, and special pensions for war veterans. For non-veteran retirees, UMMC provides private pension funds to retired employees and supplemental pensions for employees who were especially valuable to the company during their careers.

In 2013, the Red Apple Moscow International Advertising Festival recognized UMMC for the company's work in children's health. UMMC runs a children's clinic, which is one component of the company's children's health program. UMMC created a video that promoted the clinic, and the video was awarded the "bronze medal" at the festival.

The company donated equipment to help people affected by flooding in the Far East region of Russia in 2013. The total donation exceeded $900,000.

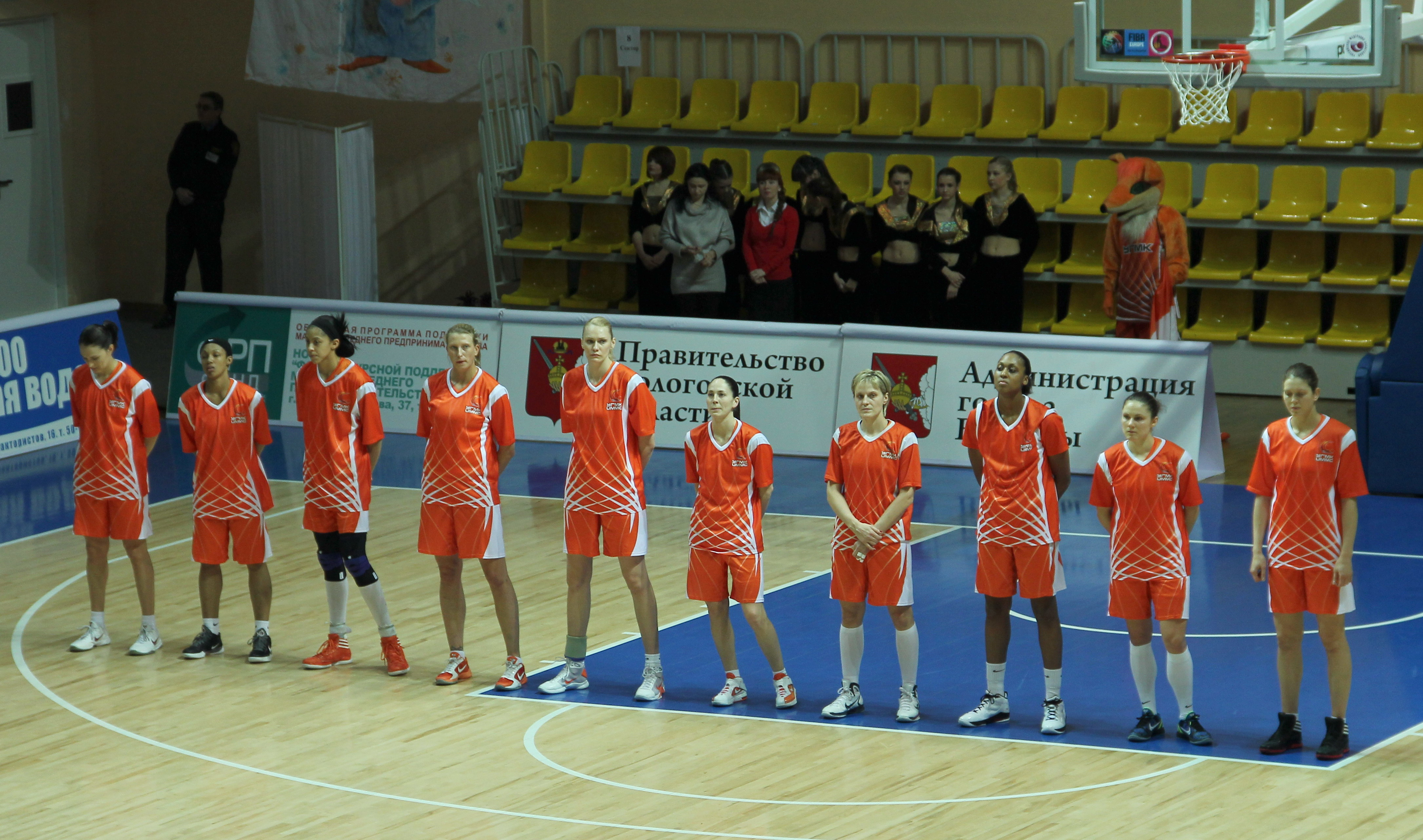
The company sponsors the championship UMMC Yekaterinburg women's basketball team.

=== Women's basketball ===
UMMC is the sponsor of Russian women's basketball team UMMC Ekaterinburg. The team won the European title in 2003. According to Croatian news source HT Croatian Telecom, this year the team is the “strongest women’s team in the history of European basketball.”

== Company ==
=== Financials ===
Net profit of the company for 2011 was 8.9 billion rubles, which was up from 3.2 billion rubles in 2010.

According to Russia & CIS Business & Financial Daily, the company might budget approximately 60 billion rubles in 2013 for investments. The company's general director, Andrei Kozitsyn, said, "We're signing contracts for next year, and have started budgeting. The average copper prices will be around $8,000 a tonne in 2012. We're hoping it stays at that level next year. We're also planning the same investment program as this year - 60 billion rubles."

UMMC plans to increase coal output to 50,600,000 tons by the year 2016. The company also plans to invest 63 billion rubles in raw materials.

In September 2012, copper smelting company OJSC Uralelectromed, an enterprise owned by UMMC, approved $2.05 billion worth of guarantees for loans for UMMC Holdings, which manages UMMC's assets.

=== People ===
Andrei Kozitsin is the CEO of UMMC. Kozitsin sits on the board at Ural Federal University. He is the recipient of the Big Golden Order of Merit of the Austrian Republic, the highest award given by the Austrian government, according to Yekaterinburg News.

=== Products ===
UMMC produces approximately 40% of Russia's output for cathode copper and zinc.

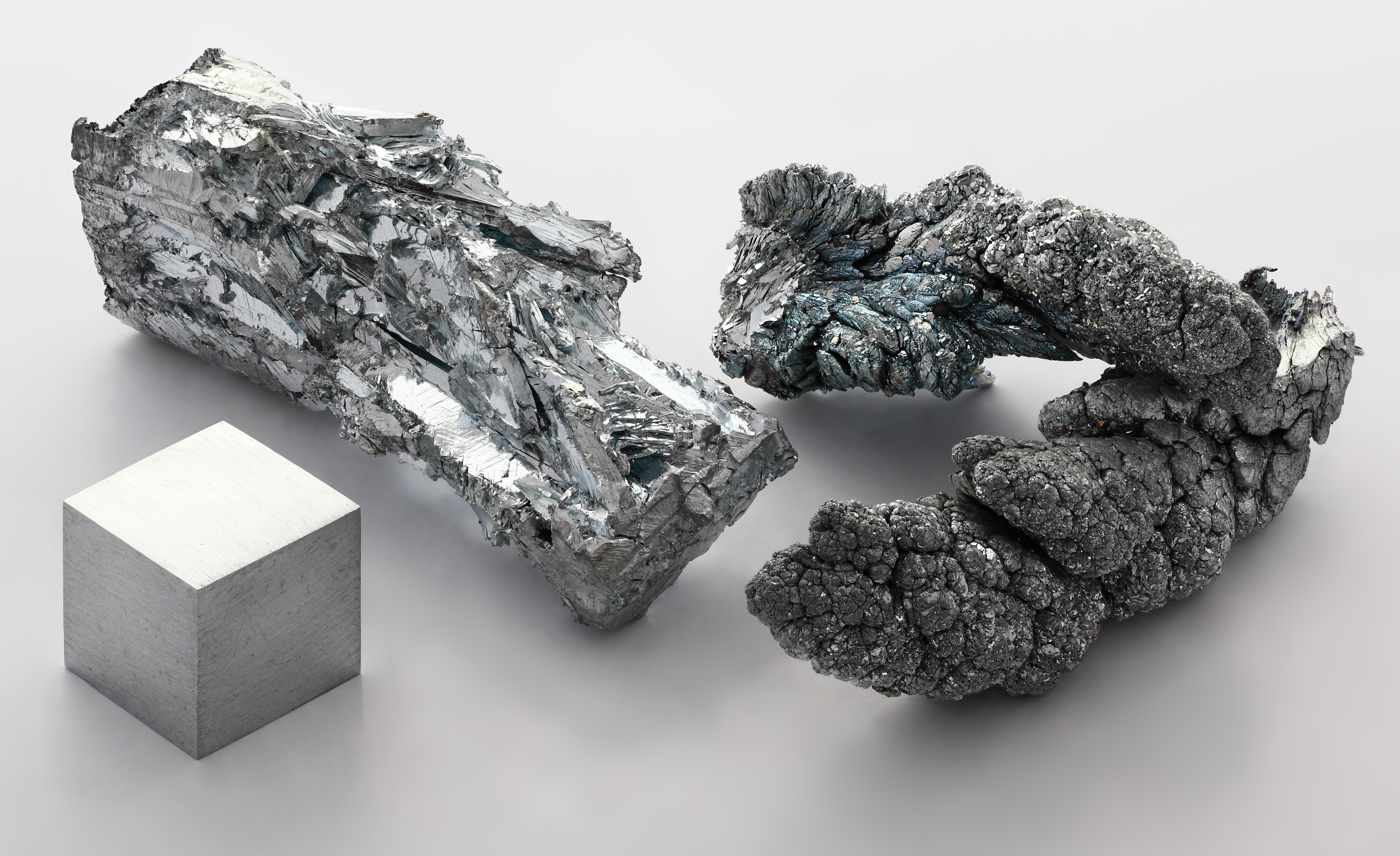
UMMC mines a significant portion of Russia's zinc output.

Additionally, it produces approximately:

- 50% of Russia's output for lead
- 25% of non-ferrous rolled products (domestic market)
- Over 50% copper powder (European market)

=== Facilities ===
- Krasnobrodskaya-Koksovaya: In 2011, RusBusinessNews reported that UMMC had commissioned a new coal processing factory. The factory is known as Krasnobrodskaya-Koksovaya. UMMC invested 3.3 billion rubles into the project. According to the article, the factory will process 3 million tons of coal each year.
  The company implemented quality improvement procedures at its facility in Kurgan, Russia.
- Lufia: In 2013, UMMC's Lufia Auto Aggregate Plant won a regional contest related to "high social efficiency", meaning that the company developed social partnerships and developed human potential.
- Mednogorsky Copper and Sulfur Plant: The plant, owned by UMMC, competed against Norilsk Nickel and won exploration and mining rights in 2012. The rights extend to the Yelanskoye and Yelkinskoye mineralizations in Voronezh Region.
- Tyumen Steel Mill: In July 2012, Metal Mining Wire reported that UMMC had planned to build and run a new steel mill in the Tyumen region of Russia. The mill would cost $675 million. According to the article, UMMC expects the new mill to produce 540,000 metric tons of steel per year.

=== Environment ===
In 2013, UMMC reported that it had invested 254 million rubles in environmental protection activities in the previous year. Specific areas of investment included sewage treatment, gas facilities, and air pollution.

Widely using administrative resource, UMMC is working for mining nickel ores in Voronezh Oblast, the Khopyor River region, near the famous Khopyor Nature Reserve, populated with protected beavers, wisents and Russian desman.

It does not taken into account nor the numerous mass protests residents of the surrounding communities that are dispersed by the police, nor the numerous concerns of scientists and environmentalists that these works simply destroy the ecological system of the river Khopyor. A number of biologists drew attention to the fact that if the work on the extraction of nickel is starting, the ecological situation in the endemic area of residence may deteriorate so much that disappeared last desmans. Thus, in addition to mining nickel ores fields, UMMC is planning to build a processing plant next door to Khopyor Nature Reserve.

According to participants of the protests against the start of mining nickel ores by Ural Mining and Metallurgical Company, the authorities are using intimidation against them, fines and the creation of an information vacuum.

On May 11, 2013, environmentalists organized a protest camp near geologist, but on May 13 the protesters were beaten up by the private security company "Patrol". The leader of the local cultural community, Igor Zhitenev, received a severe concussion. In addition to this, his jaw and ribs were broken.

On May 23, 2013, a demonstration in defense of the Khopyor River in Voronezh, timed to coincide with President Vladimir Putin's visit to the region was broken up by police.

=== Target for environmental protest extortion ===
In December 2013, Russian police detained two people for alleged extortion against UMMC. The two people, according to The Moscow Times, were formerly linked to an environmental protest movement. The men were accused of trying to extort money from UMMC in exchange for ending environmental protests against the company.

== Subsidiaries ==
=== Mining ===
UMMC owns 24 companies that do mining and processing. UMMC has 138 licenses to mine and explore subsurface mineral resources.

Subsidiaries of UMMC within the mining industry include Uralelektromed, Mednogorsk Copper-Sulphur Combine, Svyatogor, the Sredneuralsk Copper Smelter, Gaisky and Uchalinsky GOKs.

==== Chelyabinsk Zinc Plant ====
UMMC, CJSC Russkaya Mednaya Kompaniya (RMK), and other investors own Chelyabinsk Zinc Plant (CZP). CZP is the biggest Russian producer of high-grade zinc and zinc alloys.

==== Kuzbassrazrezugol ====
In February 2013, Interfax reported that Ural Mining and Metallurgical Company (UMMC) has made a buyback offer to the minority shareholders in UK Kuzbassrazrezugol' OAO (Kuzbassrazrezugol Coal Company), which is controlled by LLC UMMC Holding. UMMC became the owner of 51.018% of Kuzbassrazrezugol Coal Company's ordinary shares on December 29, 2012. According to Kuzbassrazrezugol Coal Company's list of affiliated entities as of last August 14, UMMC previously owned 25.633% of its charter capital.

==== Uralelectromed ====
Uralelectromed provides heat to all departments and divisions of the industrial site, and to part of the sporting and social facilities in Verkhnyaya Pyshma, and it also supplies heat to certain residential areas.

In August 2013, the company announced that it has begun production of a new copper electrolysis product at Uralelectromed. The company also begun a sinking process at its Jubilee field in Bashkortostan, part of a 3.5-year program to install utilities and power stations at the future site of Jubilee's administrative complex. When complete, Jubilee is expected to yield 2,625 tons of copper per year. In total, the UMMC plans to invest more than $42 million in Jubilee.

=== Non-mining ===
UMMC also has subsidiaries outside of the mining industry.

==== Civil and industrial construction ====
Yekaterinburg-City CJSC, a UMMC subsidiary, owns and operates the namesake commercial district near the center of Yekaterinburg. It was constructed in 2006 and completed in 2015.

==== Agriculture ====
UMMC owns the UMMC-Agro CJSC which focuses on agriculture. Under the aforementioned company are the following subsidiaries:

- Teplichnoye CJSC (Yekaterinburg)
- Yekaterinburg Flour Mill OJSC (Yekaterinburg)
- Patrushi Agrofirm CJSC (Sverdlovsk Region)
- Verkhnepyshminsky Dairy Plant (Sverdlovsk Region)
- Ulybka Leta CJSC (Yekaterinburg)
- Makushinsky Elevator OJSC (Kurgan Region)
- Shutikhinskaya Agrofirm CJSC (Kurgan Region)

==== Telecommunications and mass media ====
UMMC Telecom CJSC is a subsidiary of UMMC which does business in the telecommunications and mass media industries of Russia. It owns the internet service provider KuzbasSvyazUgol CJSC and the radio broadcasting company European Media Group CJSC.

===== European Media Group =====
European Media Group (founded in 1990 by French-Russian media manager Georges Polinsky) was acquired by UMMC Telecom in May 2016 from SBU Media Holdings, which previously bought EMG in 2011 from the French mass media company Lagardère Active (now Lagardère News). It owns the following subsidiaries:

- Europa Plus JSC (Moscow): operator of the namesake radio network and TV channel
- Center for New Technologies CJSC (Saint Petersburg): operator of the Dorognoe Radio network
- Radio Retro JSC (Moscow): operator of the Retro FM network
- New Radio Company CJSC (Moscow): operator of the namesake radio network and the Studio 21 radio network
- Soviet-American Communications JSC (SAC) (Moscow): operator of the Radio 7 on the Seven Hills (Radio 7) network
- Inter Radio Group CJSC (Moscow): operator of the Kalina Krasnaya radio network
- Radio Katyusha OJSC (Saint Petersburg): operator of the radio station Eldoradio (formerly Radio Katyusha)
- IDR-Format CJSC (Moscow): publisher of the Profile magazine and operator of the profile.ru website
