= Ural Federal University =

Public university in Yekaterinburg, Russia

- Уральский федеральный университет
- Former names: Ural State University, Ural State Technical University
- Motto: Russian: Думай, делай, достигай! Latin: Cogitare, agere, consequi!
- Motto in English: Think, act, achieve!
- Type: Public
- Established: 1920 (established), 2011 (integrated)
- Affiliations: University of the Arctic, Association of Sino-Russian Technical Universities, Russian Council on International Affairs, The Euroasian Universities Association, Association of technical universities of Russia and China, International Association of Architecture and Construction Higher Educational Institutions, Association of Russian leading Universities, Erasmus Plus, BRICS Network University, SCO Network University, CIS University
- Endowment: RUB 241,189,117 (~USD 1,280,000) (August 2024)
- President: Victor Koksharov (2025-2026)
- Rector: Ilya Obabkov (since 2026)
- Academic staff: 4,400+ (August 2024)
- Students: 45,000+ in total, of which 4,500+ are foreign students (August 2024)
- Location: (Russia) Yekaterinburg, Sverdlovsk Oblast, Russia; 56°50′38″N 60°39′14″E
- Campus: Urban
- Colors
- Website: http://urfu.ru/en/
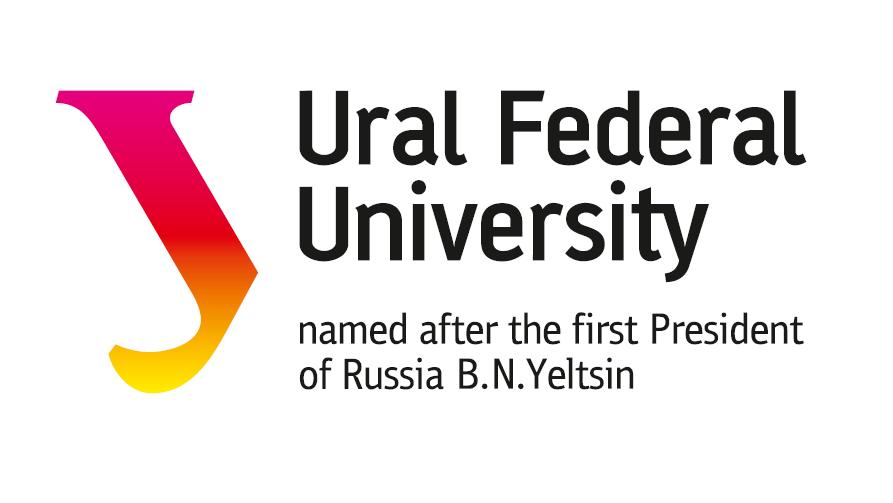

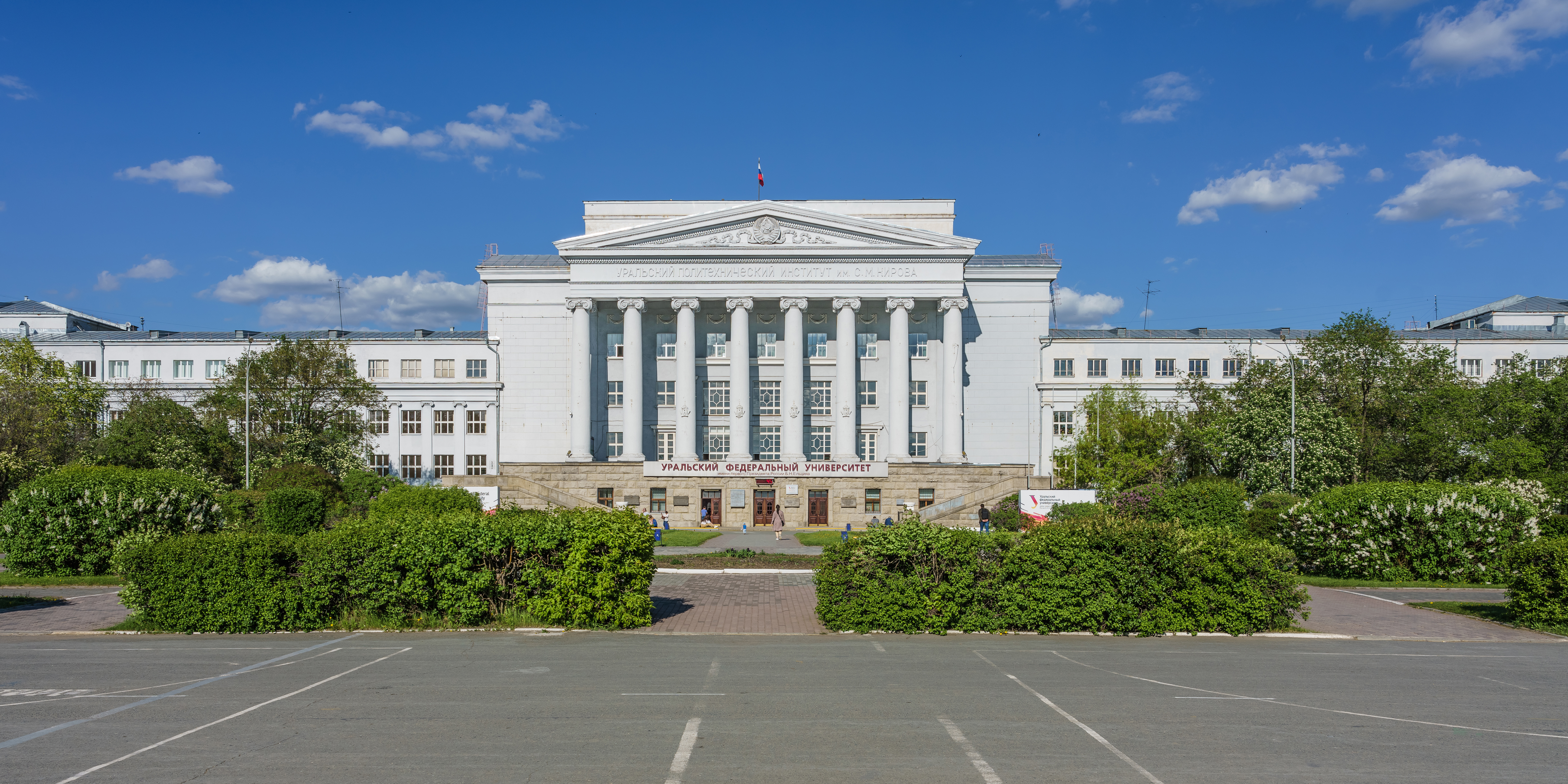
- Main university building

University rankings

Regional – Overall
- QS Emerging Europe and Central Asia: 32 (2022)

The Ural Federal University (Russian: Уральский федеральный университет имени первого Президента России Б.Н. Ельцина; often shortened to UrFU or УрФУ), named after the first president of Russia, B. N. Yeltsin, is an educational institution in the Ural region of Russia. The Ural Federal University was formed by a merger of the Ural State Technical University and Ural State University. It is one of 10 Russian Federal Universities. The university cooperates with the Russian Academy of Sciences and serves as a research and innovation center for the Ural region. UrFU offers educational programs in four areas of knowledge and 108 academic majors. UrFU also has the right to independently award academic degrees.

In 2024 UrFU was ranked 516 in the world by QS World University Rankings, 601-700 in the Academic Ranking of World Universities, 1001-1200 by World University Rankings by Times Higher Education. In 2023, it was ranked 959 in the Best Global Universities Rankings by U.S. News & World Report.

== History ==
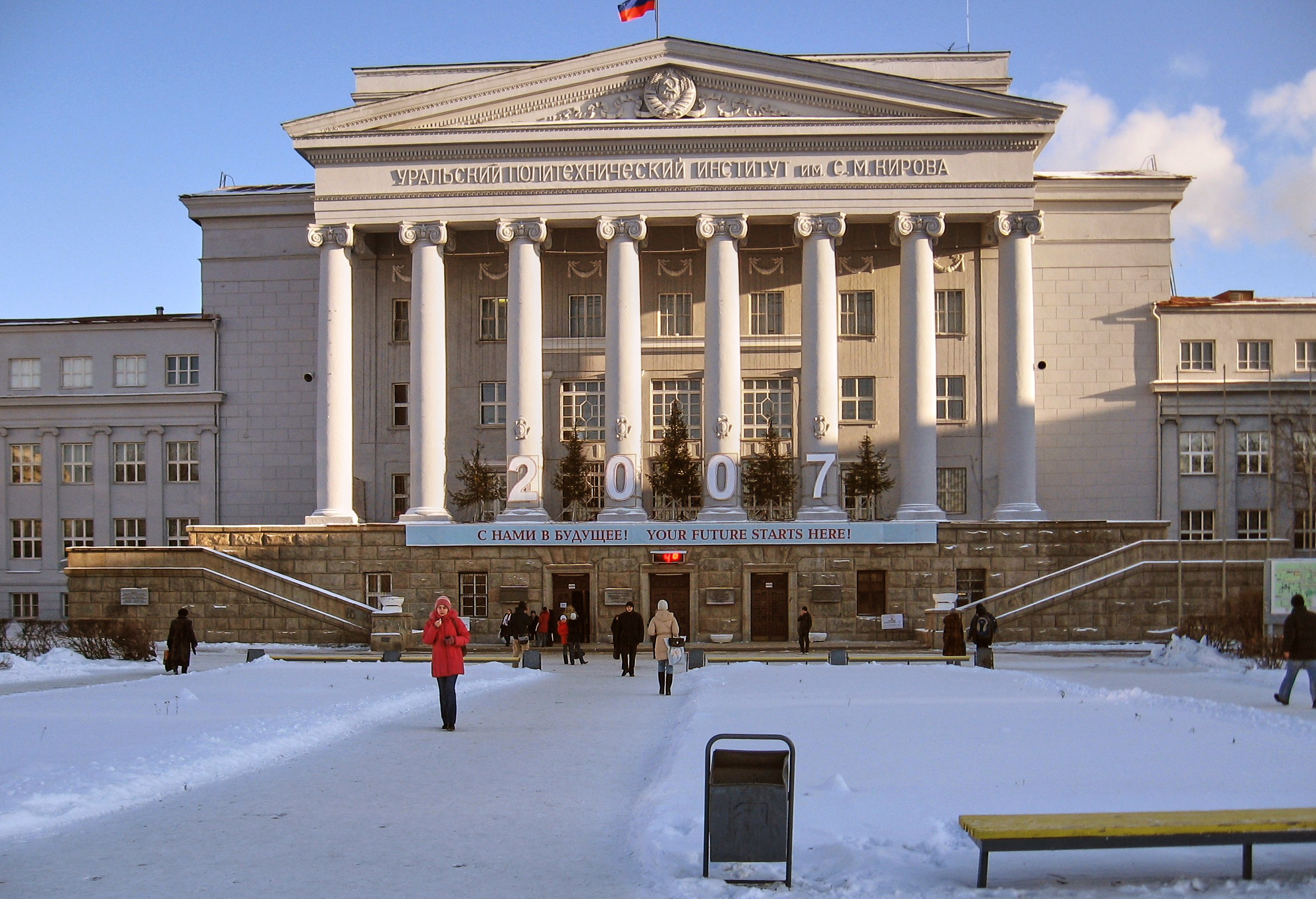
USTU (UPI)

=== 20th century ===
The Ural University was established in the town of Ekaterinburg in 1920 by a decree of the head of Soviet revolutionary government Vladimir Lenin. However, the university underwent a number of changes due to the lack of resources in such circumstances as revolution and civil war.

Finally, the university split into two: Ural State University (USU), a smaller university responsible for education in natural sciences, social sciences and humanities, and Ural Polytechnic Institute (USTU-UPI), a larger one focused on training engineers in areas such as metallurgy, machine-building, civil engineering and power engineering. At the same time, UPI was developing several new (for the time) areas of knowledge like nuclear energetics, organic chemistry and synthesis, and telecommunications. Despite such partition, both universities were connected closely with each other. The first international students arrived at Ural University in the 1940s. During almost 100 years of the university's history, it has produced more than 2,500 specialists from Europe, Asia and Africa.

=== 21st century ===
Since 2008, the university has been bearing the name of Boris Yeltsin, who graduated the Department of Civil Engineering in 1955 and became the first President of Russian Federation in 1991. The merger process of USTU-UPI and USU to create Ural Federal University (UrFU) began in 2009 and was completed by the spring of 2011. The number of full-time students studying at UrFU exceeded 45,000 in 2024. The foreign students come from more than 100 countries, and are taught by more than 4,400 faculty members. 358 educational programs were provided by 13 institutes. More than 400,000 people have graduated from Ural Federal University over the years.

As of 2024, more than 4,400 international students study at UrFU. During the last ten years, the university was visited by more than 20 international delegations. Among them are the ambassadors of the US, France, United Kingdom, Sweden, The Republic of South Africa, and Mongolia.

== Rankings ==
Ural Federal University held the following positions in national and global rankings:

Globally:

- placed 516 by QS World University Rankings, 2024
- placed 601-700th in the Academic Ranking of World Universities, 2024
- placed 959 by Best Global Universities Rankings by U.S. News & World Report, 2023
- placed 1001-1200 by World University Rankings by Times Higher Education, 2024

Emerging market regional:

- placed 32nd in the QS Emerging Europe and Central Asia University Ranking, 2022
- placed 84th among BRICS countries universities (QS World University Rankings: BRICS), 2021

Russia:

- placed 6th among Russian universities (Webometrics Ranking of World Universities), 2024
- placed 14th in the ranking of Russian universities by the Interfax Rating Agency, 2022

== Structure ==
=== Institutes and departments ===
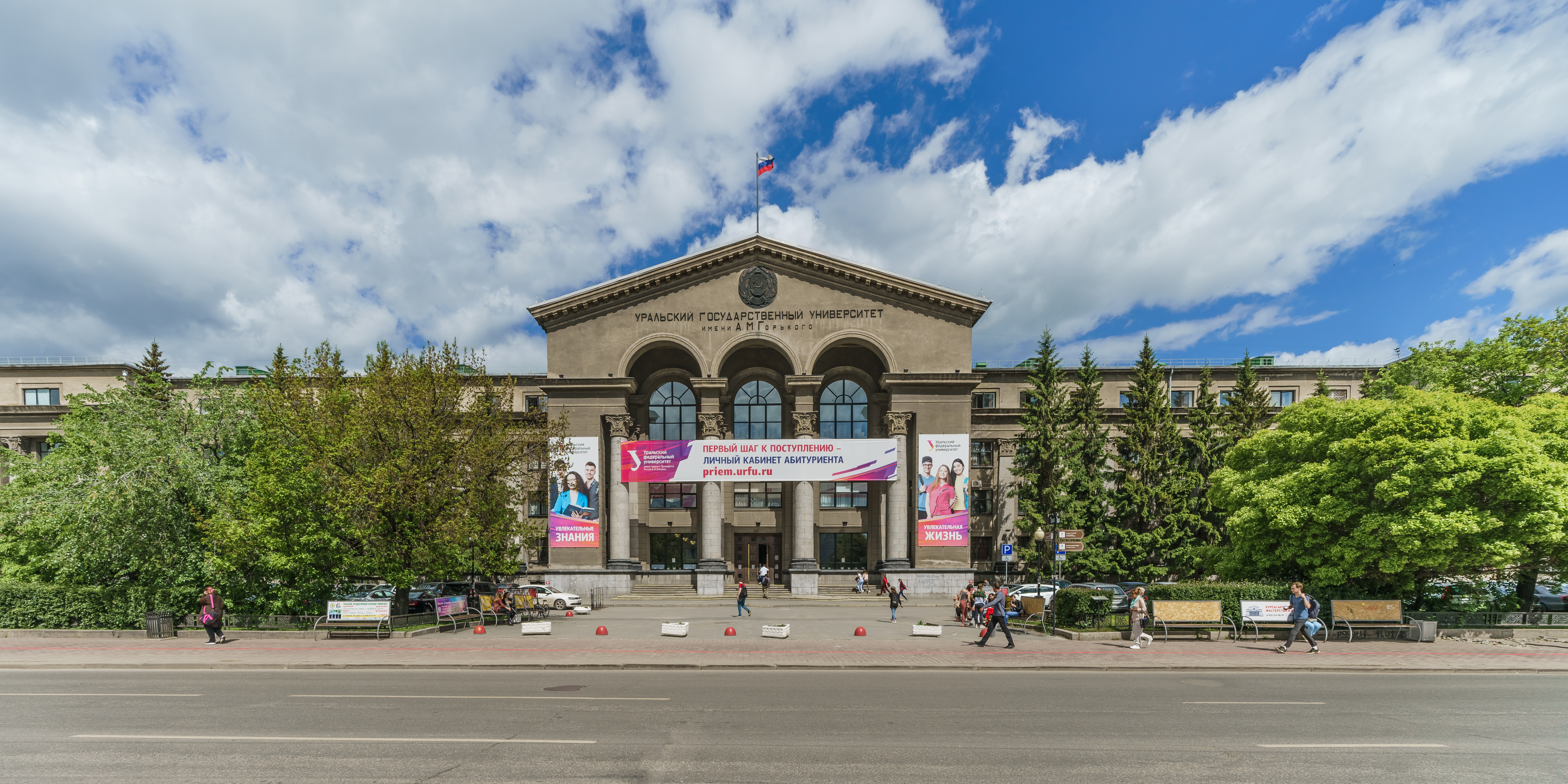
USU

Ural Federal University includes the following institutes:

- Engineering School of Information Technologies, Telecommunications and Control Systems
- Graduate School of Economics and Management
- Institute of Chemical Engineering
- Institute of Civil Engineering and Architecture
- Institute of Fundamental Education
- Institute of New Materials and Technologies
- Institute of Natural Sciences and Mathematics
- Institute of Open Educational Technologies
- Institute of Physical Education, Sports and Youth Policy
- Institute of Physics and Technology
- Ural Advanced Engineering School
- Ural Institute of Humanities
- Ural Power Engineering Institute

=== Establishments of Basic General Education ===
- Specialized Education and Research Center UrFU (Lyceum No.130)

=== Branches and representative offices ===
- Nizhny Tagil Technological Institute - a multidisciplinary higher education establishment located in Nizhny Tagil. The institute has trained more than 14,500 mechanical engineers, metallurgists and specialists in automation and maintenance of equipment.
- Polytechnical Institute in Kamensk-Uralsky - a higher education establishment that offers bachelor programs in radiotechnics, electric power and metallurgy.

== International partnership ==
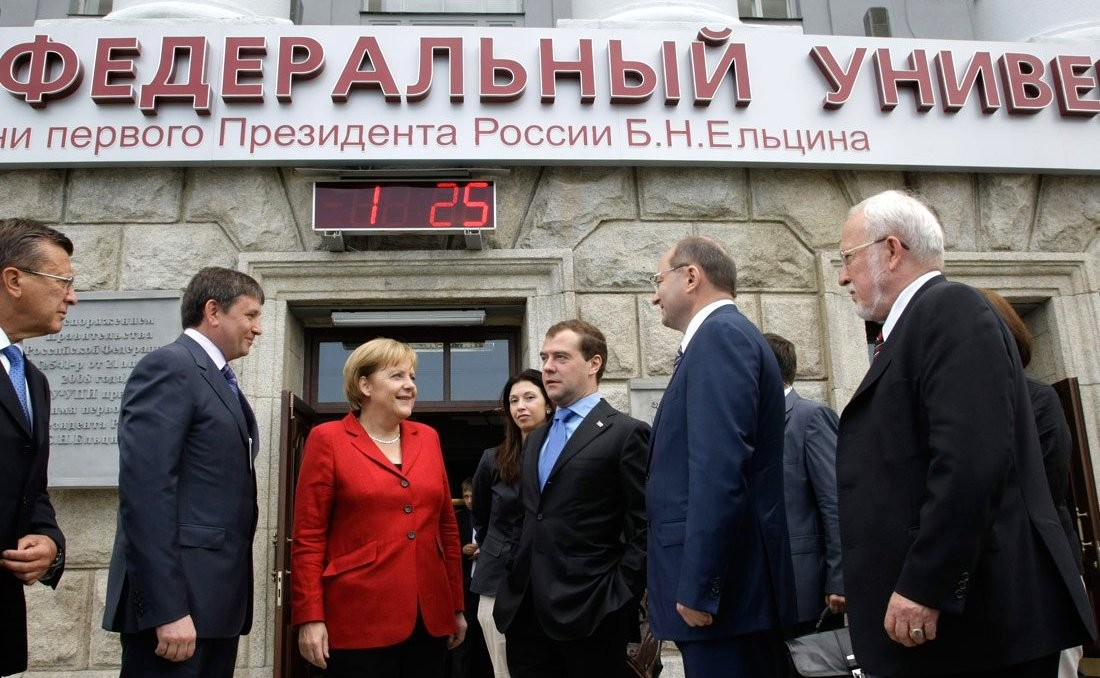
Dmitry Medvedev and Angela Merkel at the "Petersburg Dialogue" Russian-German forum in 2010

One important direction of activity is integration of Ural Federal University into the international research and educational environment. The university participates in network educational projects (Shanghai Cooperation Organisation, European Union, UNESCO, BRICS).

The university is a member of the University of the Arctic. UArctic is an international cooperative network based in the Circumpolar Arctic region, consisting of more than 200 universities, colleges, and other organizations with an interest in promoting education and research in the Arctic region. The collaboration has been paused after the beginning of the Russo-Ukrainian War in 2022.

== Facts and figures ==
The Ural Federal University is the largest federal university in Russia. It has 15 educational buildings, 18 dormitories, 20 sports facilities and 438 multimedia classrooms.

UrFU is ranked among the top 10 universities in Russia and is a participant in the Priority 2030 program.

The university has more than 400 collaboration agreements with international partners. It also has student exchange programs with more than 150 universities from 40 countries.

== Research ==
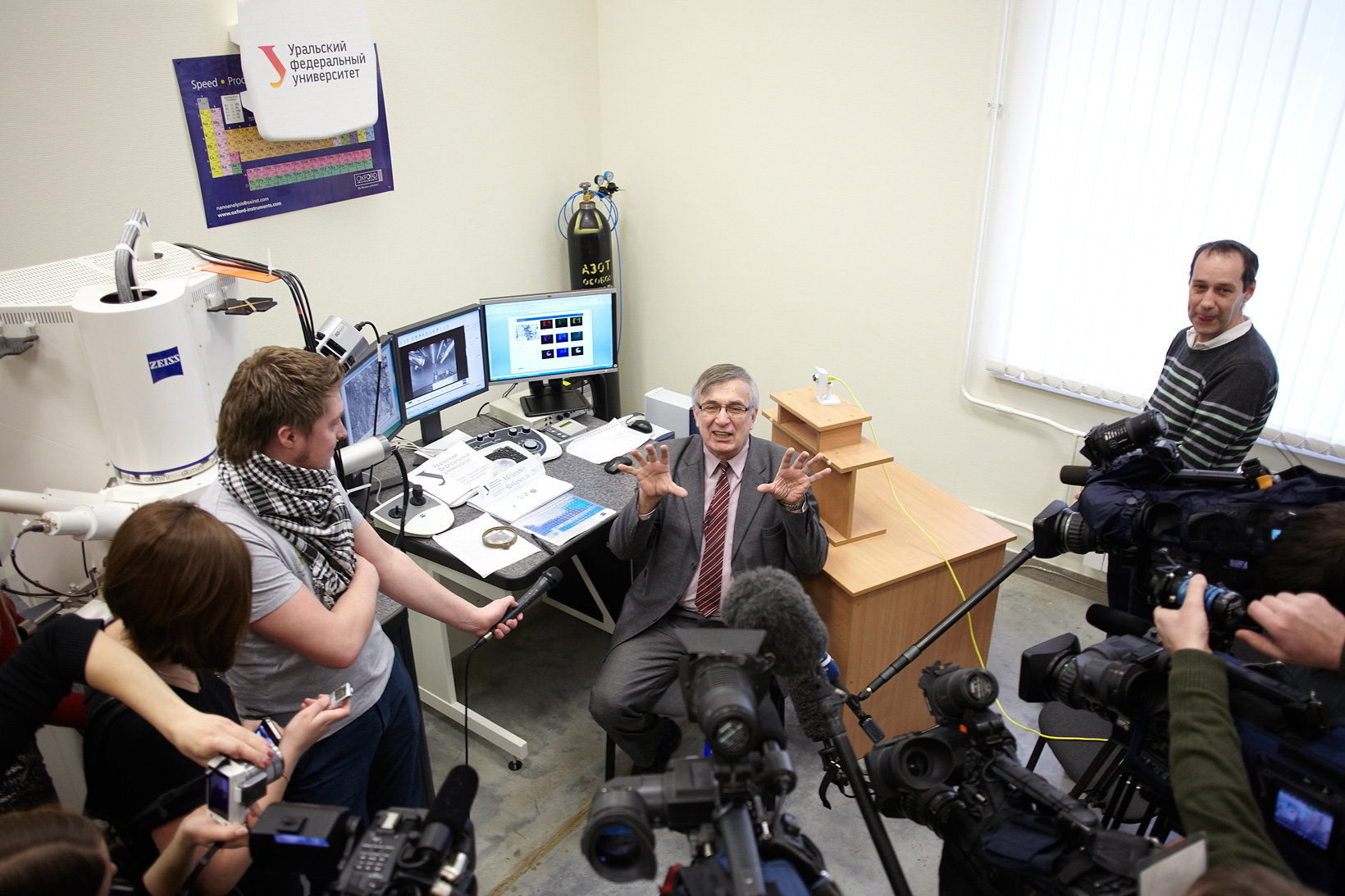
UrFU scientist Victor Grohovsky talks to press during presentation of Chebarkul meteorite samples analysis

Key areas of scientific research at UrFU:

- Physics and astronomy: condensed matter physics, physics of magnetic materials, optics and laser physics, radio physics, electronics, acoustics, quantum theory of solids; spectroscopy of activated crystals, fundamental studies of properties of materials under extreme conditions, the physics of low-temperature and nonideal plasma and its use in power engineering and clean technologies; theoretical and experimental thermal physics, physical gas-kinetics and surface physics, physico-chemical mechanics of heterogeneous and multiphase media, stellar astronomy.
- Power engineering: development of scientific principles of energy policy and mechanisms for its realization under market economy conditions, the fundamental problem of creating a safe and clean energy (including nuclear and fusion energy), non-conventional energy conversion processes, the fundamental problems of energy conservation and fuel efficiency.
- Metallurgy: development of resource-saving and environmentally friendly processes of complex processing of ores and its wastes, the creation of new metallic materials with the desired properties.
- Communication technologies: integrated information and telecommunications networks and systems, the mathematical theory of pattern recognition.
- Mathematics and Mechanics: theory of control and differential games, theory of algebraic systems and its applications to computer systems, the theory of functions and operators, the fundamental problem of construction of systems of automatic designing, mathematical methods of research of nonlinear control systems and processes, mathematical modeling in medicine.
- Chemistry and Materials Science: Theory of chemical bonding, kinetics and mechanisms of chemical reactions, solid state chemistry, chemistry of radioactive elements, physico-chemistry of polymers, the development of methods for the directed synthesis of complex organic molecules in order to obtain physiologically active substances with a selective effect, the development of the fundamentals of catalysis and the creation of highly efficient and selective heterogeneous, homogeneous and enzymatic catalysts and catalytic systems, the creation of chemical current sources, the creation of structural ceramics and silicate materials with sufficient ductility on the basis of oxides, nitrides, carbides, oxycarbonitrides.
- Biology: population and evolutionary ecology, animal ecology, environmental forecasting and assessment, plant physiology and studies of photosynthesis, industrial botany, ornithology.
- Philosophy and sociology: the history of philosophy, philosophical anthropology, epistemology, aesthetics, social philosophy, sociology of the individual.
- History and Ethnography: Source Studies, Archaeology and Social History of Byzantium, Ural and Siberian Archeology and Ethnography, Siberian and Ural archaeography; social history of the Urals and Siberia, theory and history of international relations.
- Philology: onomastics, dialect lexicology and lexicography, lexical semantics, linguistics and stylistics, folklore and literature of the Urals and Siberia, Russian classical and modern literature, literary stylistics, theory and history of journalism.
- Economics: Regional Economics, competition and institutional aspects of economic growth, foreign investment and international transfer of technology, corporate governance, economic history and the history of economic thought, mathematical methods in economics.

== Supervisory Board ==
In accordance with the Federal Law of 03.11.2006 No. 174-FZ "About autonomous institutions", a supervisory board was created in UrFU. As of March 2019, it consisted of:

- Dmitry Pumpyansky, Chairman of the UrFU Supervisory Board, President of the Sverdlovsk Oblast Union of Industrialists and Entrepreneurs, chairman of the Board of Directors of OAO TMK
- Marina Borovskaya, Deputy Minister of Science and Higher Education of the Russian Federation
- Valery Charushin, Chairman of the Presidium of the Ural Branch of the Russian Academy of Sciences
- Arkady Chernetsky, Member of the Federation Council of Federal Assembly of the Russian Federation
- Andrey Kozitsyn, Director General of the UMMC-Holding
- Evgeny Kuyvashev, Governor of the Sverdlovsk Oblast
- Yaroslav Kuzminov, Rector of the National Research University – Higher School of Economics
- Igor Manzhurov, Head of the Ural Regional Office of the Ministry of Science and Higher Education of the Russian Federation
- Dmitry Peskov, Director of "Young Professionals" sector at the autonomous non-profit organization "Agency for Strategic Initiatives for New Projects Promotion"
- Aleksandr Povalko, Director General of the Russian Venture Company
- Tatyana Yumasheva, Director of the Charitable foundation of the first President of Russia Boris Yeltsin.

== Alumni ==
UrFU Alumni Association was established in 2012. In 2012–2013, the university established offices of the Alumni Association in Mongolia and Russian cities of Moscow, Nizhny Tagil, Kamensk-Uralsky and Noyabrsk. Currently, the Alumni Association is represented in Vietnam, Uzbekistan, Tajikistan, Kazakhstan, China, Armenia and Kyrgyzstan.

Among the famous graduates of the Ural Federal University there are politicians, scientists, sportsmen, writers and directors.

The famous alumni of the Ural Federal University:

- Boris Yeltsin, the first President of the Russian Federation
- Nikolay Krasovsky, the Soviet and Russian scientist in the field of Mathematics and Mechanics
- David Belyavskiy, the Russian gymnast and the Olympic champion
- Nikolai Ryzhkov, the Soviet Prime Minister and the Russian senator
- Nurtai Abykayev, the Senior politician of Kazakhstan
- Arkady Chernetsky, the Russian senator and the former Mayor of Ekaterinburg
- Gennady Burbulis, the Russian politician and scholar
- Yuri Gurevich, the computer scientist
- Michael Zinigrad, the Israeli scientist
- Gleb Panfilov, the film director
- Vladislav Krapivin, the writer, the poet, and the publisher
- Pavel Datsyuk, the ice hockey player
- Anton Shipulin, the biathlete and the statesperson
- Kostya Tszyu, the Russian Australian former professional boxer
- Battogtokh Choijil Suren, the Minister of Energy of Mongolia

== Awards and achievements ==
The "Dedicatied to Young People" short film, which features Ural Federal University graduates giving advice to current UrFU students, won the ‘Most Creative Corporate Institution Video’ QS-Apple Creative Award and received the title of QS-Apple Creative Idol. The contest was held in 2011, at the 7th QS Asia Pacific Professional Leaders in Education Conference and Exhibition, in Manila (Philippines), and was organized by Quacquarelli Symonds.

== See also ==
- Open access in Russia
- Department of Theory and History of Political Science
