= Ural State Technical University =

University in Yekaterinburg, Russia

- Уральский государственный технический университет - УПИ имени первого Президента России Б.Н. Ельцина
- Former name: Ural Polytechnic Institute
- Motto: Ingenium Creatio Labor
- Motto in English: "Brilliance, creation, work"
- Type: Technical University
- Established: 1920
- President: S.S. Naboichenko
- Rector: A.I. Matern
- Faculty: 2,171 (lecturers and professors)
- Students: 23,100
- Location: Mira 19 street, Ekaterinburg, Russia, 620002, Ekaterinburg, Sverdlovsk Oblast, Russia; 56°50′38″N 60°39′14″E
- Campus: Urban
- Building details
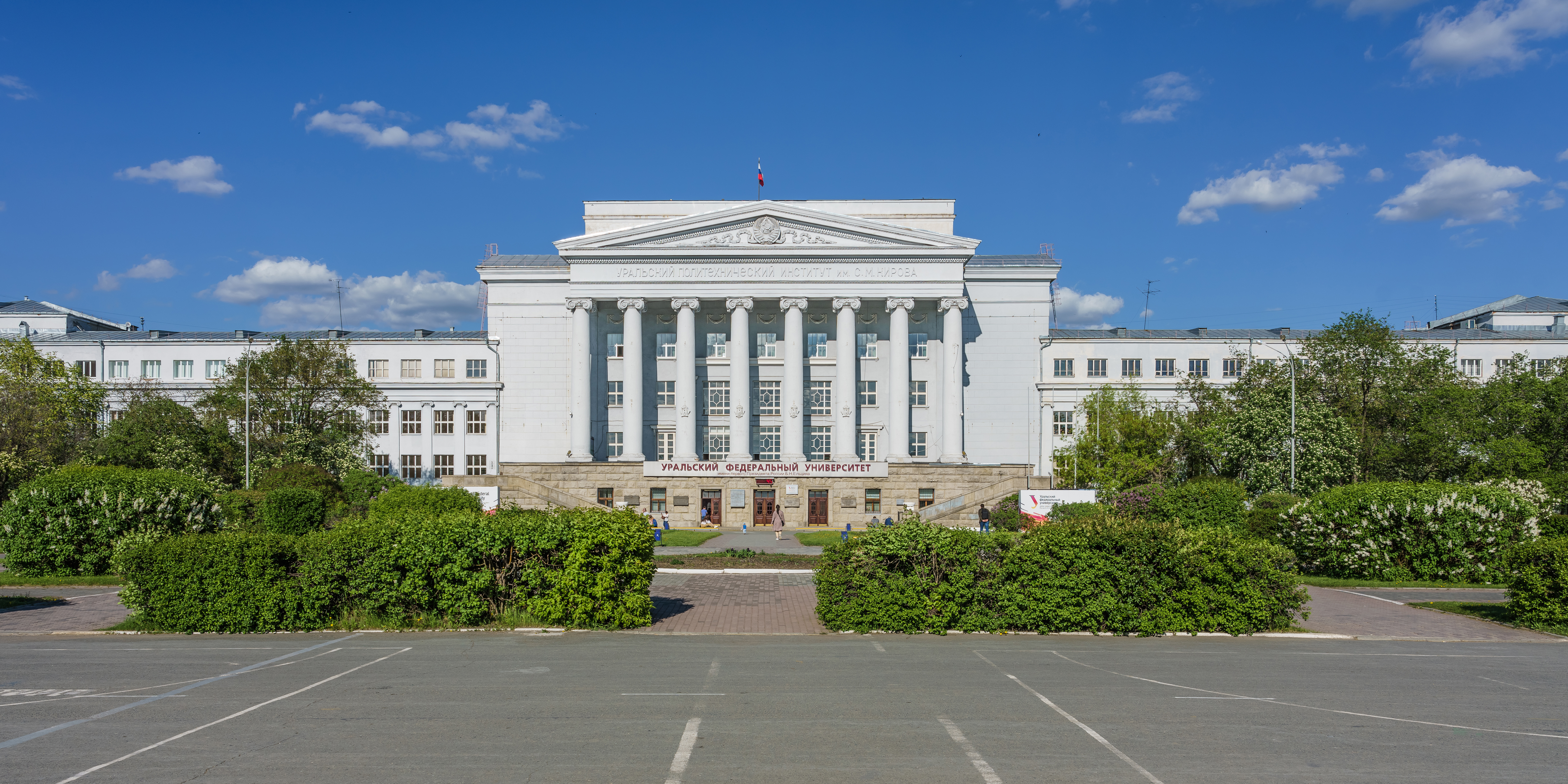

Ural State Technical University (USTU) is a public technical university in Yekaterinburg, Sverdlovsk Oblast, Russia. It is the biggest technical institution of higher education in Russia, with close ties to local industry in the Urals. Its motto, Ingenium Creatio Labor, means "brilliance, creation, work".

== Overview ==
USTU has 20 faculties including: Metallurgical, Chemical Engineering, Building Materials, Civil Engineering, Physics and physics engineering, Radio Engineering, Electrical Engineering, Heat Power Engineering, Mechanical Engineering, Economics and Management, Military Science, Physical Training, Humanities, Continuing education, and a Graduate school. USTU graduates 3000 engineers annually.

== History ==
USTU was founded in 1920. It was formerly known as Ural Polytechnic Institute (UPI).

The school has rapidly expanded due to the industrialization program of the Soviet Government, which created a high demand for engineering positions. The USTU was key in providing local industrial enterprises with technical and engineering staff.

In the 1940s, though suffering from a shortage of personnel due to World War II, the USTU received a great stimulus for development as the military needed to increase production for new industrial goods from the plants in the Urals. Many industrial plants were moved to the Urals due to the partial occupation of Western Russia by Nazi military forces.

After the war, the USTU has kept close ties with the military industry, mostly by preparing a large amount of engineers for military purposes.

With the growth of Soviet Economy, the USTU kept expanding. In 1991, however, due to the economical crisis following the collapse of the Soviet Union, it suffered from acute underfunding by the Russian Government. It was not until the mid-1990s that the USTU began to find appreciable non-governmental sources of funding, mostly by means of establishing business ties with local industrial enterprises that survived or arose as result of the economical crisis.

Currently, the USTU is preparing to undergo integration with several other universities in Yekaterinburg in order to increase its chances of successful competition with other universities in Russia.

In April 2008 it was named after Boris Yeltsin - Yeltsin Ural State Technical University.

In April 2010, USTU united with USU (Ural State University named after A. M. Gorky) and were named Ural Federal University.

== Notable alumni ==
- Arkady Mikhailovich Chernetsky, Mayor of Yekaterinburg
- Andrei Kozitsyn, billionaire
- Boris Yeltsin, President of Russia (1991-1999)

== See also ==
- Ural State Law Academy
- Ural State University
