= Serov constituency =

Constituency in Sverdlovsk

Serov single-member constituency
- Constituency of the Russian State Duma
- Deputy: Sergey Bidonko; United Russia
- Federal subject: Sverdlovsk Oblast
- Districts: Alapayevsk, Alapayevsky, Garinsky, Ivdel, Kachkanar, Karpinsk, Krasnoturyinsk, Krasnouralsk, Lesnoy, Makhnyovo, Nizhnyaya Salda, Nizhnyaya Tura, Novolyalinsky, Pelym, Severouralsk, Serovsky, Sosva, Taborinsky, Tavdinsky, Verkhnesaldinsky, Verkhotursky, Volchansk
- Voters: 446,373 (2026)

The Serov constituency (No.175 (Note: No.166 in 1993-1995, No.167 in 1995-2007, No.174 in 2016–2026)) is a Russian legislative constituency in Sverdlovsk Oblast. The constituency covers northern Sverdlovsk Oblast.

The constituency has been represented since the 2026 by United Russia deputy Sergey Bidonko, three-term State Duma member and former Vice Governor of Sverdlovsk Oblast, who won the open seat after two-term United Russia incumbent Anton Shipulin ran for Legislative Assembly of Sverdlovsk Oblast.

== Boundaries ==
1993–2007: Garinsky District, Ivdel, Kachkanar, Karpinsk, Krasnoturyinsk, Krasnouralsk, Kushva, Lesnoy, Nizhneturinsky District, Novolyalinsky District, Pelym, Serov, Serovsky District, Severouralsk, Verkhnyaya Tura, Verkhotursky District, Volchansk
The constituency covered sparsely populated northern Sverdlovsk Oblast, including the towns Ivdel, Kachkanar, Karpinsk, Krasnoturyinsk, Krasnouralsk, Kushva, Serov and Severouralsk.

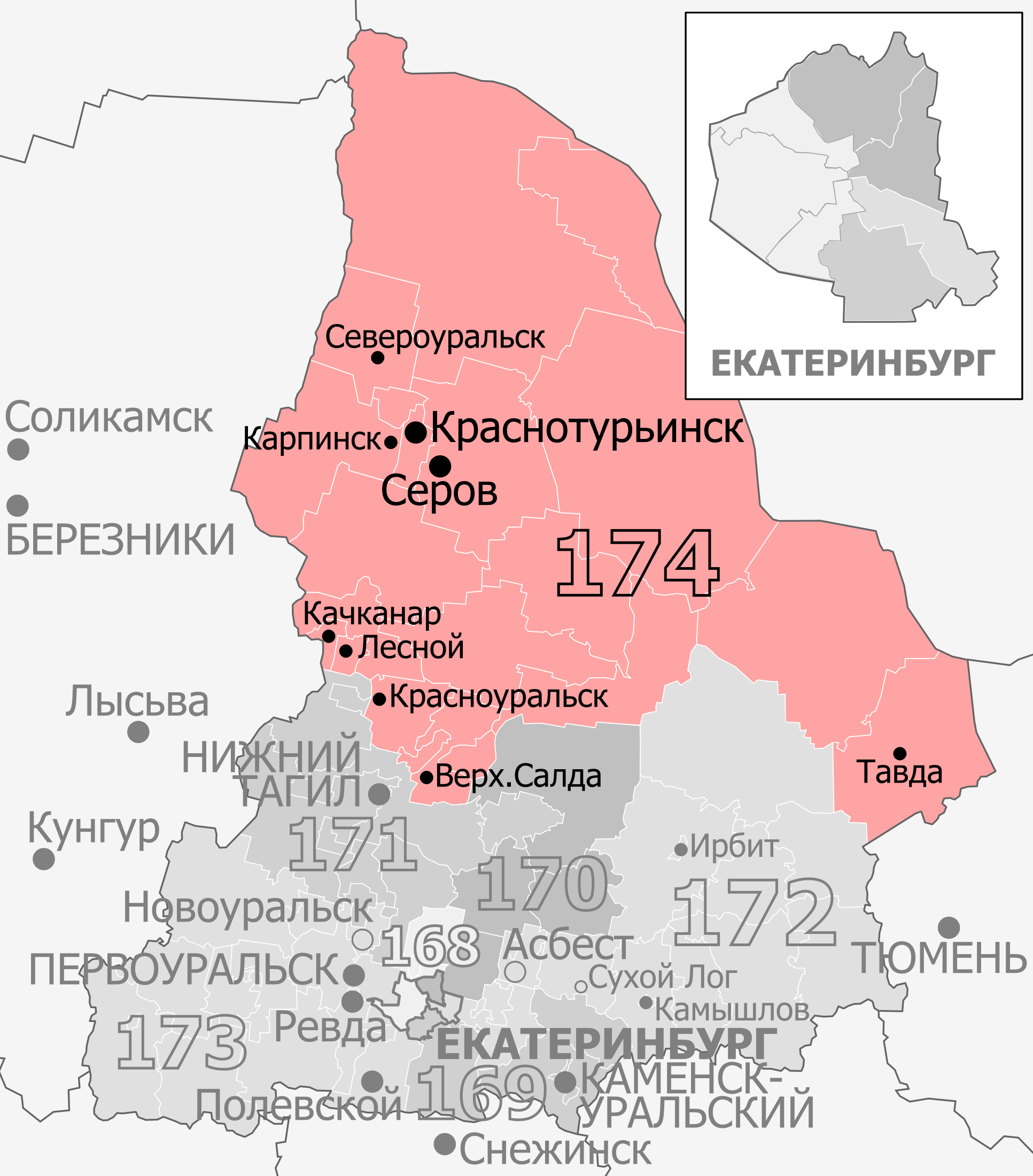
Constituency boundaries from 2016 to 2026

2016–2026: Garinsky District, Ivdel, Kachkanar, Karpinsk, Krasnoturyinsk, Krasnouralsk, Lesnoy, Makhnyovo, Nizhnyaya Salda, Nizhnyaya Tura, Novolyalinsky District, Pelym, Severouralsk, Serovsky, Sosva, Svobodny, Taborinsky District, Tavdinsky District, Verkhnesaldinsky District, Verkhotursky District, Volchansk
The constituency was re-created for the 2016 election and retained most of its former territory, losing Kushva and Verkhnyaya Tura to Nizhny Tagil constituency. This seat instead gained Nizhnyaya Salda, Verkhnyaya Salda, Tavda and Taborinsky District from the former Artyomovsky constituency.

2026–present: Alapayevsk, Alapayevsky District, Garinsky District, Ivdel, Kachkanar, Karpinsk, Krasnoturyinsk, Krasnouralsk, Lesnoy, Makhnyovo, Nizhnyaya Salda, Nizhnyaya Tura, Novolyalinsky District, Pelym, Severouralsk, Serovsky, Sosva, Taborinsky District, Tavdinsky District, Verkhnesaldinsky District, Verkhotursky District, Volchansk
The constituency was slightly changed following the 2025 redistricting, losing closed city Svobodny to Nizhny Tagil constituency. This seat instead gained Alapayevsk from Nizhny Tagil constituency and neighbouring Alapayevsky District from Beryozovsky constituency.

== Members elected ==
Election	Member	Party
1993	Andrey Selivanov	Independent
1995	Andrey Selivanov	Forward, Russia!
1999	Valery Vorotnikov	Spiritual Heritage
2003	Anton Bakov	Party of Russia's Rebirth-Russian Party of Life
2007	Proportional representation - no election by constituency	
2011	Proportional representation - no election by constituency	
2016	Sergey Bidonko (Note: appointed as Vice Governor of Sverdlovsk Oblast in December 2018)	United Russia
2019	Anton Shipulin	United Russia
2021	Anton Shipulin	United Russia
2026	Sergey Bidonko	United Russia

== Election results ==
=== 1993 ===
Summary of the 12 December 1993 Russian legislative election in the Serov constituency
Candidate	Party	Votes	%
Andrey Selivanov	Independent	104,828	45.68%
Nikolay Trusov	Independent	51,186	22.30%
against all		59,746	26.03%
Total		229,490	100%

=== 1995 ===
Summary of the 17 December 1995 Russian legislative election in the Serov constituency
Candidate	Party	Votes	%
Andrey Selivanov (incumbent)	Forward, Russia!	74,141	30.22%
Anatoly Sysoyev	Independent	57,125	23.28%
Pavel Fedulev	Transformation of the Fatherland	42,284	17.23%
Yevgeny Osipov	Congress of Russian Communities	22,146	9.03%
Gaptelbar Bareyev	Liberal Democratic Party	18,694	7.62%
against all		26,350	10.74%
Total		245,347	100%

=== 1999 ===
Summary of the 19 December 1999 Russian legislative election in the Serov constituency
Candidate	Party	Votes	%
Valery Vorotnikov	Spiritual Heritage	66,994	28.67%
Andrey Selivanov (incumbent)	Union of Right Forces	56,073	24.00%
Yevgeny Artyukh	Party of Pensioners	21,495	9.20%
Vitaly Biryukov	Independent	15,142	6.48%
Aleksandr Ogluzdin	Russian Socialist Party	2,301	0.98%
against all		57,273	24.51%
Total		233,639	100%

=== 2003 ===
Summary of the 7 December 2003 Russian legislative election in the Serov constituency
Candidate	Party	Votes	%
Anton Bakov	Party of Russia's Rebirth-Russian Party of Life	80,164	35.79%
Andrey Selivanov	Union of Right Forces	57,968	25.88%
Valery Vorotnikov (incumbent)	People’s Party	22,197	9.91%
Yevgeny Artyukh	Russian Pensioners' Party-Party of Social Justice	14,744	6.58%
Ivan Kanisev	Communist Party	6,345	2.83%
Vsevolod Millerov	Liberal Democratic Party	4,450	1.99%
Valery Melekhin	Independent	2,510	1.12%
Artyom Glatskikh	Independent	1,870	0.83%
against all		30,633	13.68%
Total		224,059	100%

=== 2016 ===
Summary of the 18 September 2016 Russian legislative election in the Serov constituency
Candidate	Party	Votes	%
Sergey Bidonko	United Russia	86,944	43.64%
Sergey Semyonovykh	A Just Russia	34,856	17.50%
Aleksandr Stolbov	Communist Party	24,144	12.12%
Danil Shilkov	Liberal Democratic Party	21,055	10.57%
Galina Bastrygina	People's Freedom Party	6,388	3.21%
Aleksandr Ilyin	Civic Platform	5,083	2.55%
Lev Mordvov	Party of Growth	3,584	1.80%
Georgy Zharkoy	Patriots of Russia	3,185	1.60%
Maksim Shingarkin	Rodina	2,423	1.22%
Total		199,229	100%

=== 2019 ===
Summary of the 8 September 2019 by-election in the Serov constituency
Candidate	Party	Votes	%
Anton Shipulin	United Russia	46,015	41.59%
Aleksey Korovkin	A Just Russia	26,583	24.03%
Gabbas Dautov	Communist Party	15,276	13.81%
Yevgenia Chudnovets	Liberal Democratic Party	8,280	7.48%
Irina Skachkova	Yabloko	3,999	3.55%
Dmitry Zenov	Communists of Russia	3,700	3.34%
Igor Ruzakov	The Greens	2,157	1.95%
Total		110,635	100%

=== 2021 ===
Summary of the 17-19 September 2021 Russian legislative election in the Serov constituency
Candidate	Party	Votes	%
Anton Shipulin (incumbent)	United Russia	92,055	40.63%
Gabbas Dautov	Communist Party	45,955	20.28%
Aleksey Korovkin	A Just Russia — For Truth	27,739	12.24%
Pavel Myakishev	Liberal Democratic Party	14,921	6.59%
Yaroslav Borodin	New People	13,225	5.84%
Anatoly Rabinovich	Party of Pensioners	6,470	2.86%
Sergey Melnik	Party of Growth	6,262	2.76%
Dmitry Kalinin	Yabloko	4,387	1.94%
Valery Khvostov	Rodina	2,234	0.99%
Total		226,580	100%

=== 2026 ===
Summary of the 18-20 September 2026 Russian legislative election in the Serov constituency
Candidate	Party	Votes	%
Sergey Bidonko	United Russia	119,834	49.36%
Igor Chudov	Communist Party	36,877	15.19%
Valery Molokov	New People	24,659	10.16%
Aleksey Korovkin	A Just Russia	22,207	9.15%
Andrey Burgart	Liberal Democratic Party	20,904	8.61%
Dmitry Shumilov	Rodina	6,692	2.76%
Total		242,770	100%
