= Serovsky =

Serovsky (masculine), Serovskaya (feminine), or Serovskoye (neuter) may refer to:

- Serovsky District, a district of Sverdlovsk Oblast, Russia
- Serovsky Urban Okrug, a municipal formation of Sverdlovsk Oblast, which the town of Serov is incorporated as
- Serovsky (rural locality) (Serovskaya, Serovskoye), name of several rural localities in Russia
