= Sosva =

Sosva may refer to:

- Sosva (river), a tributary of the Tavda in Sverdlovsk Oblast, Russia
- Sosva, Serovsky District, Sverdlovsk Oblast, an urban-type settlement in Serovsky District, Sverdlovsk Oblast, Russia
- Sosva, Khanty–Mansi Autonomous Okrug, a settlement in Khanty–Mansi Autonomous Okrug, Russia
- Sosva, Severouralsk, Sverdlovsk Oblast, a settlement under jurisdiction of the town of Severouralsk, Sverdlovsk Oblast, Russia
- Sosva dialect, the base dialect of the Mansi literary language

== See also ==
- Severnaya Sosva River, in Khanty–Mansi Autonomous Okrug, Russia
