= Privokzalny =

Privokzalny (masculine), Privokzalnaya (feminine), or Privokzalnoye (neuter) may refer to:

- Privokzalny City District, a city district of Tula, Tula Oblast, Russia
- Privokzalny (inhabited locality) (Privokzalnaya, Privokzalnoye), name of several inhabited localities in Russia
