= Vladimir Marchev =

Russian serial killer (born 1977)

- Born: Vladimir Mikhailovich Marchev; August 7, 1977 (age 49); Verkhnyaya Sinyachikha, Sverdlovsk Oblast, RSFSR
- Other names: "The Degtyarsk Maniac" "The Road Maniac" "The Sverdlovsk Ripper" "The Excavator Killer" "The Urals Butcher"
- Conviction: Murder x3
- Penalty: Life imprisonment

Details
- Victims: 3
- Span of crimes: 2010–2011
- Country: Russia
- State: Sverdlovsk
- Date apprehended: October 14, 2011

Vladimir Mikhailovich Marchev (Russian: Владимир Михайлович Марчев; born August 7, 1977), known as The Degtyarsk Maniac (Russian: Дегтярский маньяк), is a Russian serial killer who murdered three women around Sverdlovsk Oblast from 2010 to 2011. While his motive was robbery, he additionally decapitated, cut off the hands and then dismembered their remains, all of which he then scattered in nearby areas.

After being identified as the killer, he was tried, convicted and sentenced to life imprisonment.

== Early life ==
Relatively little is known about Marchev's early life. Born on August 7, 1977, in the village of Verkhnyaya Sinyachikha, he was the only son of Mikhail and Nadezhda Marchev, who were described as fairly ordinary people. Throughout his childhood and adolescence, Vladimir did not exhibit any signs of aggression towards others, and was characterized rather positively. After graduation, he found work as the driver of an excavator and moved to Degtyarsk. There, he lived a secluded life by himself, as he had apparent problems communicating with women.

== Crimes ==
=== Assault and imprisonment ===
In 2006, Marchev offered a female passer-by a ride in his car, and after she accepted, he proceeded to rob and attempt to strangle her. However, the victim managed to escape and reported the attack to the police, who promptly arrested him. For this, Marchev was convicted on robbery charges and sentenced to spend three years at a prison colony.

=== Release and murders ===
After serving out his sentence in full, Marchev was released from prison. Not long after this, he would resume his criminal activities, but this time would start killing his victims in-between his work shifts at a village in the nearby Yamalo-Nenets Autonomous Okrug.

His modus operandi consisted of selecting women aged between 20 and 47 at various highways, to whom he would offer a ride in his Lada Riva to their desired destination in exchange for a small fee. If the victims agreed, Marchev would instead drive them to a nearby forest, where he would strangle and stab them before stealing all of their valuables. Once this was done, he would then decapitate the bodies, cut off the hands and then scatter the dismembered remains around the area. The stolen property, mostly cellphones, would then be sold to fencers dealing in stolen goods in the Yekaterinburg area.

The first murder occurred on February 7, 2010. On that day, Marchev was clearing snow off the streets of Pervouralsk with his snowplow when he noticed 23-year-old Yana Nurgalieva walking down the street. After running up to her and knocking her over, Marchev dragged Nurgalieva into his vehicle, drove to a vacant lot in the Yelnichny neighborhood and strangled her with a stocking. He then left the body nearby and covered it up with snow, but returned a few days later to cut off her arms up to the elbow and also remove her head. The remains were then discarded at different sections of the nearby highway. Nurgalieva's various remains were found individually between March and April 2010. When queried about the reason why he attacked her, Marchev claimed that she was obstructing him and he almost hit her at one point - due to this, he got angry and decided to kill her on the spot.

On the morning after New Year's Eve in 2011, 20-year-old student Milana Ivanova left her family's home to go to a friend's house. On the way there, she accepted a ride from Marchev, to whom she paid 500 rubles to drive her to Yekaterinburg. When they reached the Verkh-Isetsky district, Marchev suddenly stopped the car and attacked Ivanova, striking her several times on the head with a wrench and strangling her with a scarf. He then forced her to walk to the nearby woods, where he slashed her throat with a knife and then dismembered her body. Ivanova's decapitated body, hands and head were found on June 22, along the 5th Kilometer of the Staromoskovskiy tract.

On the evening of October 5, 2011, Marchev persuaded 47-year-old acquaintance Irina Samoilova to accompany him to the city of Revda, where he had supposedly found her a job at a local company. Halfway there, near the village of Kungurka, Marchev stopped the car and tried to convince her to have sex with him. Once she refused, he struck Samoilova several times on the head with a stick, causing her to fall unconscious. He then attempted to rape her, but as he was unable to do so, he dragged her out to a nearby ditch and then slit her throat. Like the previous victims, he then cut off her hands and head, which he folded in her clothes and then dumped in a nearby area along with the body.

== Arrest, trial and imprisonment ==
The murders caused a public outcry by frightened locals, leading to the creation of a special task force to solve them. The three killings were quickly linked due to the distinction of the cut off hands and decapitations, indicating that there was a single killer at work.

Not long after establishing the task force, a detective was able to trace one of the victims' cellphones to its new owner - through this, they were able to establish that the last calls prior to the phone's purchase were made to a man named Vladimir Marchev, a resident of Degtyarsk. Based on this, Marchev was promptly arrested on October 14, 2011, and almost immediately wrote a detailed confession in which he described everything that had occurred. He later retracted his confessions, claiming to have been coerced by the officers into confessing.

As a later psychiatric evaluation ruled that he was sane to stand trial, Marchev was tried on multiple charges of murder, attempted rape and theft. On September 30, 2013, the Sverdlovsk Regional Court found him guilty on all counts and subsequently sentenced him to life imprisonment.

== See also ==
- List of Russian serial killers
