= Koptelovo =

Koptelovo (Russian: Коптелово) is the name of several rural localities in Russia:

- Koptelovo (selo), Sverdlovsk Oblast, a selo in Alapayevsky District of Sverdlovsk Oblast
- Koptelovo (settlement), Sverdlovsk Oblast, a settlement in Alapayevsky District of Sverdlovsk Oblast
- Koptelovo, Vologda Oblast, a village in Chuprinsky Selsoviet of Kaduysky District of Vologda Oblast
