= Sergey Bidonko =

Russian politician (born 1975)

Sergey Bidonko MP
- Сергей Бидонько
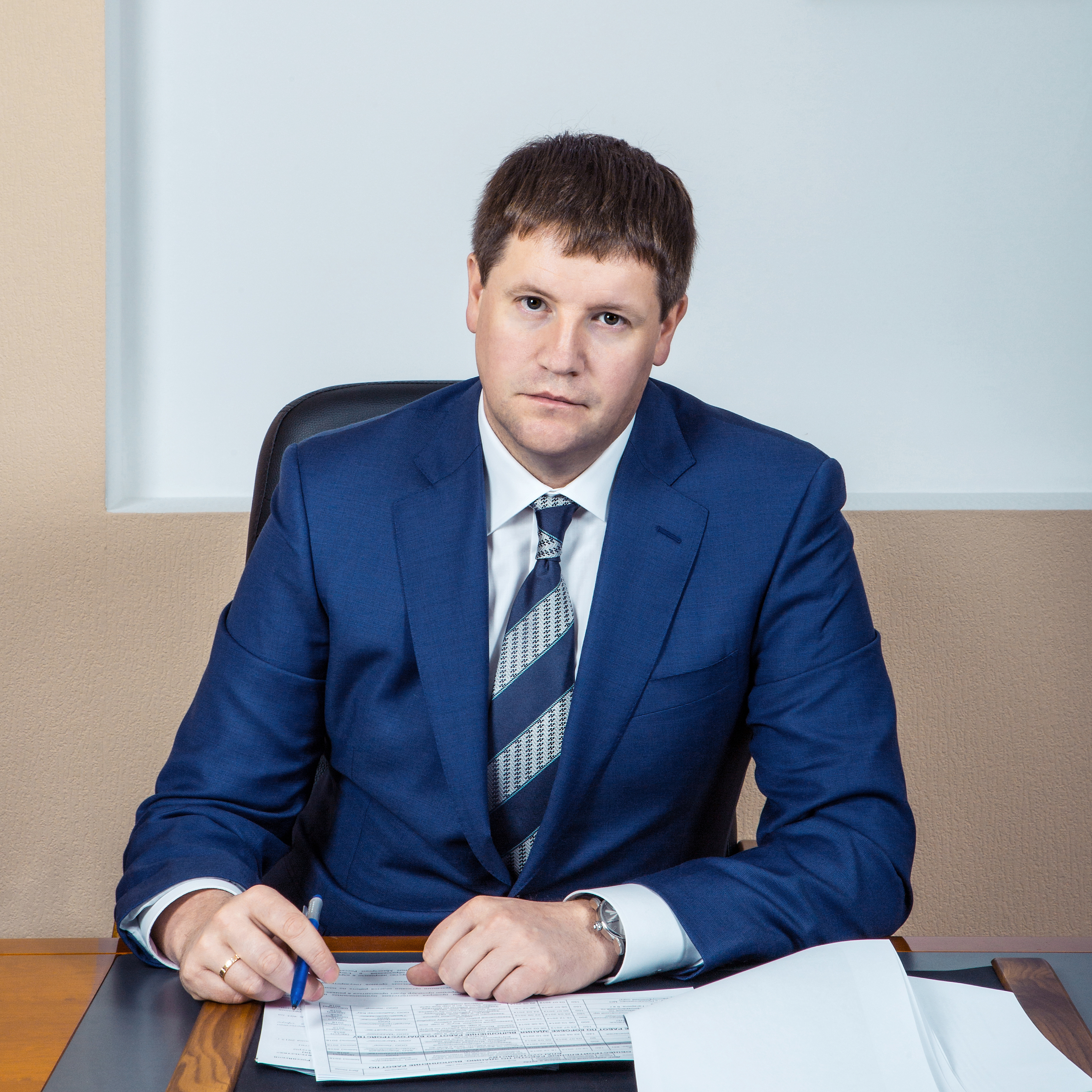

Member of the State Duma (Party List Seat)
- Incumbent
- Assumed office 12 October 2021

Vice-governor of the Sverdlovsk Oblast
- In office 2019–2021

Member of the State Duma for Sverdlovsk Oblast
- In office 5 October 2016 – 13 December 2018
- Preceded by: constituency re-established
- Succeeded by: Anton Shipulin
- Constituency: Serov (No. 174)

Personal details
- Born: 18 August 1975 (age 50) Karpinsk, RSFSR, USSR
- Party: United Russia
- Education: Krasnotur'inskiy Industrial'nyy Kolledzh; Ural State Technical University; RANEPA

Sergey Yurievich Bidonko (Russian: Сергей Юрьевич Бидонько; born 18 August 1975, Karpinsk, Sverdlovsk Oblast) is a Russian political figure, deputy of the 7th and 8th State Duma convocations.

In 1993 he graduated from the Krasnotur'inskiy Industrial'nyy Kolledzh. Later he continued his education at the Ural State Technical University (2000) and the Russian Presidential Academy of National Economy and Public Administration (2011).

== Career ==
Bidonko started his political career in 2009 when he was elected the head of Karpinsk (nominated by the United Russia). In 2013 he was re-elected for the same position. On 15 December 2014, Governor of Sverdlovsk Oblast appointed Bidonko Deputy Minister of Construction and Architecture of the region.

In 2016 he was elected deputy of the 7th State Duma convocation. Bidonko resigned his deputy powers on 13 December 2018, as he was appointed vice-governor of Sverdlovsk Oblast.

In September 2021, he ran for a seat in the State Duma of the Russian Federation of the 8th convocation. Following the initial distribution of seats, he did not receive a mandate, but later (on 29 September 2021), after the Governor of Sverdlovsk Oblast Yevgeny Kuyvashev declined his deputy mandate, he was given the vacant seat as the fourth candidate on the list of Regional Group No. 10 (Sverdlovsk Oblast).

He is a member of the regional political council of the United Russia party branch in Sverdlovsk Oblast.

== Revenue ==
In 2020 Bidonko earned 15.3 million rubles. In 2021 – 5.8 million rubles.

== Sanctions ==
He was sanctioned by the UK government in 2022 in relation to the Russo-Ukrainian War.

He is one of the members of the State Duma the United States Treasury sanctioned on 24 March 2022 in response to the 2022 Russian invasion of Ukraine.
