= Verkhotursky =

Verkhotursky (masculine), Verkhoturskaya (feminine), or Verkhoturskoye (neuter) may refer to:

- Verkhotursky District, a district of Sverdlovsk Oblast, Russia
  - Verkhotursky Urban Okrug, the municipal formation, which the district is incorporated as
- Verkhotursky Uyezd, an administrative division (an uyezd) of Perm Governorate, Russian Empire and later Russian SFSR
