= Makhnyovo =

Urban-type settlement in Sverdlovsk Oblast, Russia

Makhnyovo Махнёво
- Urban-type settlement
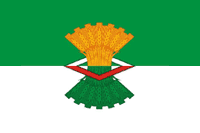
- Flag
- Interactive map of Makhnyovo
- Location of Makhnyovo Makhnyovo (Sverdlovsk Oblast)
- Coordinates: 58°26′59″N 61°42′34″E
- Country: Russia
- Federal subject: Sverdlovsk Oblast
- Administrative district: Alapayevsky District
- Founded: 1624

Population (2010 Census)
  - Total: 3,399
  - Estimate (2025): 2,598 (−23.6%)

Municipal status
  - Urban okrug: Makhnyovskoye Urban Okrug
  - Capital of: Makhnyovskoye Urban Okrug
- Time zone: UTC+5 (MSK+2)
- Postal code: 624621
- OKTMO ID: 65769000051
- Website: mahnevo.ru

Makhnyovo (Russian: Махнёво) is an urban locality (an urban-type settlement) in Alapayevsky District of Sverdlovsk Oblast, Russia. Population: 3,399 (2010 census); 3,750 (2002 census); 4,233 (1989 Soviet census).

== Administrative and municipal status ==
Within the framework of the administrative divisions, it is, together with the work settlement of Verkhnyaya Sinyachikha and 111 rural localities, subordinated to Alapayevsky District. As a municipal division, Makhnyovo, together with thirty-nine rural localities of Alapayevsky District, is incorporated separately as Makhnyovskoye Urban Okrug. The work settlement of Verkhnyaya Sinyachikha and the other 72 rural localities are incorporated separately as Alapayevskoye Urban Okrug.
