= Iryna Bekeshkina =

Ukrainian sociologist (1952–2020)

- Ірина Бекешкінa
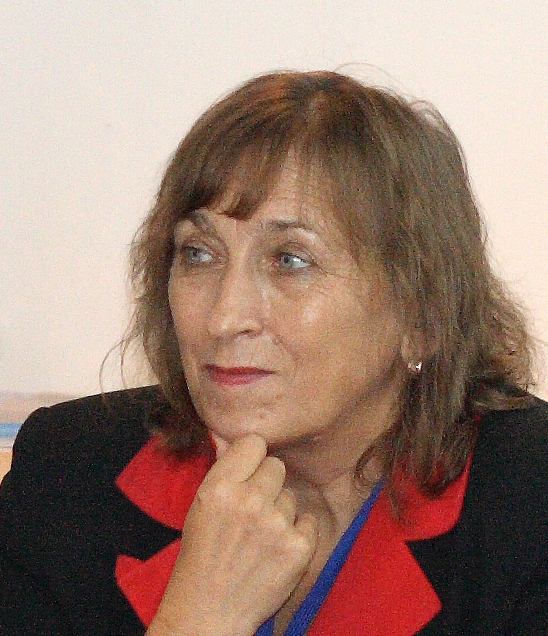
- Born: February 4, 1952; Ivdel, Sverdlovsk Oblast, RSFSR, Soviet Union
- Died: March 20, 2020 (aged 68); Kyiv, Ukraine
- Education: Taras Shevchenko National University of Kyiv; Soviet Academy of Sciences
- Scientific career
- Fields: Sociology
- Workplaces: Soviet Academy of Sciences; National Academy of Sciences of Ukraine; Ilko Kucheriv Democratic Initiatives Foundation

Iryna Erykivna Bekeshkina (Ukrainian: Ірина Ериківна Бекешкінa; 4 February 1952 – 20 March 2020) was a Ukrainian sociologist. She was the head of the Ilko Kucheriv Democratic Initiatives Foundation from 2010 until 2020. She specialized in the study of Ukrainian society and politics. She was also a frequent media commentator and policy advocate.

== Life and career ==
In 1974, Bekeshkina graduated from the Taras Shevchenko University of Kyiv with a degree in philosophy. She then completed her graduate studies at the Institute of Philosophy within the Soviet Academy of Sciences.

Bekeshkina was a scientific editor of Філософська думка (Philosophical Thought, uk), one of the leading philosophy journals of Ukraine. In 1977, she became a researcher at the Soviet Academy of Sciences, and beginning in 1990 she worked as a researcher at the Institute of Sociology of the National Academy of Sciences of Ukraine.

Bekeshkina began to work at the Ilko Kucheriv Democratic Initiatives Foundation in 1996. There she conducted research, publishing papers largely on the sociology of politics and elections. She particularly focused on the politics of Ukraine.

Bekeshkina became the head of the Democratic Initiatives Foundation in 2010, and remained the head of that organization until her death. She was also a member of the board of the Ukrainian Think Tanks Liaison Office, and was affiliated with the Media Director NGO, a Ukrainian media watchdog organization.

Bekeshkina was named the 38th most influential woman in Ukraine by Focus Magazine in 2007, and in 2008 she was named 51st most influential woman in Ukraine. In explaining these rankings, the magazine cited her public-facing work in the study of political information and Ukrainian foreign policy. In 2018 and 2020, she was included in lists of the 100 most successful women in Ukraine compiled by the magazine HB (uk).

In 2020, Bekeshkina died in Kyiv from stomach cancer.

In November 2022, as part of a derussification campaign, Kyiv's Dmitry Karbyshev Street was renamed to Iryna Bekeshkina Street.

== Selected awards ==
- Senior Fellow, National Academy of Sciences of Ukraine
