= Privokzalny (inhabited locality) =

Privokzalny (Russian: Привокза́льный; masculine), Privokzalnaya (Привокза́льная; feminine), or Privokzalnoye (Привокза́льное; neuter) is the name of several inhabited localities in Russia.

Modern rural localities

- Privokzalny, Oryol Oblast, a settlement in Nizhne-Zalegoshchensky Selsoviet of Zalegoshchensky District of Oryol Oblast
- Privokzalny, Ryazan Oblast, a settlement in Krasnoozerkovsky Rural Okrug of Sarayevsky District of Ryazan Oblast
- Privokzalny, Sverdlovsk Oblast, a settlement in Verkhotursky District of Sverdlovsk Oblast

Historical inhabited localities

- Privokzalny, Moscow Oblast, a former urban-type settlement in Moscow Oblast; since 2003—a part of the town of Volokolamsk
