= Anton Shipulin =

Russian biathlete and politician

- Антон Шипулин
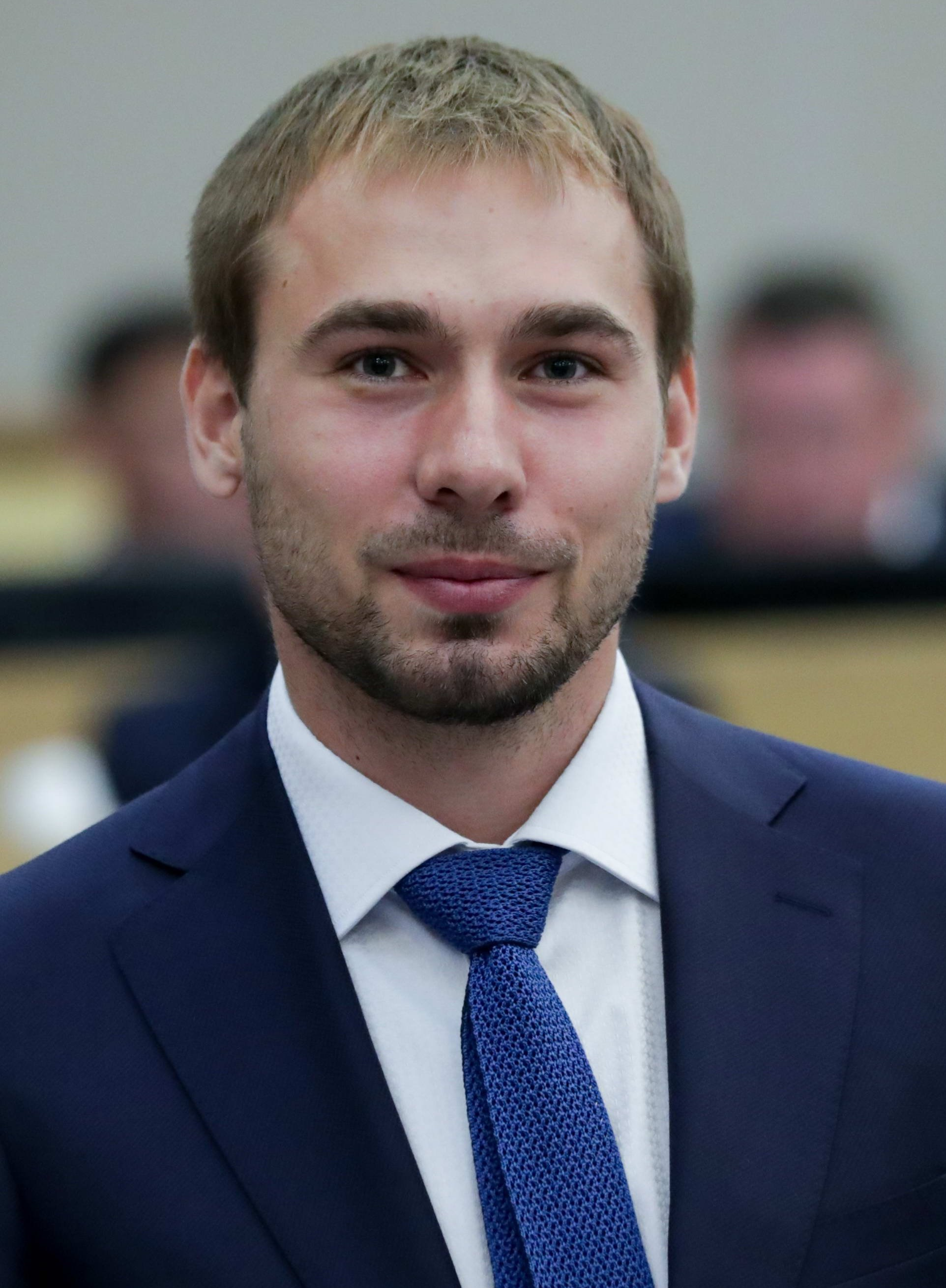
- Shipulin in 2019

Member of the State Duma for Sverdlovsk Oblast
- Incumbent
- Assumed office 17 September 2019
- Preceded by: Sergey Bidonko
- Constituency: Serov (No. 174)

Personal details
- Born: 21 August 1987 (age 39) Tyumen, RSFSR, USSR
- Party: United Russia
- Education: Tyumen Law Institute of the Ministry of Internal Affairs; Ural Federal University
- Sports career
- Nicknames: "Shipa", "Chip", "The Champion of Everything", "The genius of the Russian land"
- Height: 1.85 m (6 ft 1 in)
- Weight: 81 kg (179 lb)

Professional information
- Sport: Biathlon
- Club: Dynamo
- Skis: Fischer
- Rifle: Anschütz 1827F Fortner – Sprint Customised with dragon carved into the forearm
- World Cup debut: 10 January 2009
- Retired: 31 December 2018

World Championships
- Teams: 6 (2011, 2012, 2013, 2015, 2016, 2017)
- Medals: 7 (1 gold)

World Cup
- Seasons: 10 (2008/09–2017/18)
- All races: 257
- Individual victories: 11
- All victories: 22
- Individual podiums: 44
- All podiums: 70
- Discipline titles: 1: 1 Mass start (2014–15)
Medal record
Event	1st	2nd	3rd
Olympic Games	0	0	1
World Championships	1	2	3
Junior/Youth World Championships	4	2	0
Total	5	5	4
Olympic Games
Disqualified	2010 Vancouver	4 × 7.5 km relay
Disqualified	2014 Sochi	4 × 7.5 km relay
World Championships
Gold medal – first place	2017 Hochfilzen	4 × 7.5 km relay
Disqualified	2011 Khanty-Mansiysk	4 × 7.5 km relay
Silver medal – second place	2013 Nové Město	15 km mass start
Silver medal – second place	2015 Kontiolahti	12.5 km pursuit
Bronze medal – third place	2012 Rupholding	12.5 km pursuit
Bronze medal – third place	2013 Nové Město	12.5 km pursuit
Bronze medal – third place	2017 Hochfilzen	Mixed relay
Junior World Championships
Gold medal – first place	2008 Ruhpolding	10 km sprint
Gold medal – first place	2008 Ruhpolding	12.5 km pursuit
Gold medal – first place	2008 Ruhpolding	4 × 7.5 km relay
Silver medal – second place	2007 Martell	15 km individual
Silver medal – second place	2008 Ruhpolding	15 km individual
Youth World Championships
Gold medal – first place	2006 Presque Isle	3 × 7.5 km relay
- Updated on 8 March 2018

Anton Vladimirovich Shipulin (Russian: Антон Владимирович Шипулин; born 21 August 1987) is a retired Russian biathlete and politician serving as the member of the State Duma since 2019.

== Biography ==
He was born in the family of Vladimir Shipulin and Alla Shipulina, masters of sports in cross-country skiing and biathlon. He started training at an early age, at first he took up ski racing under the guidance of his father, but once he saw a rifle from his older sister, Anastasiya Kuzmina, who was doing biathlon, he got the idea to try his hand at biathlon. In 2002, his parents arranged for their son to go to a sports school in Khanty-Mansiysk to work with Svetlana Sleptsova's coach Mikhail Novikov. Under his guidance, Shipulin began his career in biathlon.

=== Sport career ===
In 2004, he returned to his hometown, Tyumen, and entered the Tyumen Law Institute. After 2 victories at the European Youth Olympic Winter Festival, he drew the attention of Vladimir Putrov, coach of Olympic champions Juri Kashkarov, Evgeny Redkin and Aleksandr Popov. After receiving an offer from Putrov, Shipulin moved to Yekaterinburg in 2006. He got his first victory as a member of the relay team at the 2006 Biathlon Junior World Championships in Presque Isle, USA.

In 2007 in Val Martello, Italy, he was silver medallist in the individual pursuit, opening the account of personal victories at the international level. At the 2007 Biathlon European Championships he won a full set of medals: silver in the sprint, bronze in the pursuit and gold in the relay. In 2008 he successfully performed at the Junior World Championships in Ruhpolding: he was the first in sprint and pursuit, having made a series of six consecutive zeroes; together with Dmitry Blinov, Pavel Magazeev, Victor Vasiliev he won the relay; in the individual race he missed a shot and became the silver medallist, where he missed only 0.6 seconds. At the 2008 Biathlon European Championships he became the absolute European champion under 21, winning all 3 individual races and the relay.

For the 2008/2009 season he was preparing for the Russian national team under the guidance of Vladimir Alikin. According to the results of control training the coaching staff decided that the athlete would start the season with IBU Cup. On 20 December 2008 in the pursuit race, starting from 18th position, he managed to finish in the top three. In 2009, Alikin challenged Shipulin to the January rounds of the World Cup. In Oberhof on 10 January 2009 he made his debut in the sprint and showed 72nd time. The next start in the World Cup was the sprint race in Ruhpolding, where Anton again finished 72nd. The low results of the World Cup debutant were not only a consequence of a cold, but primarily due to the fact that the young body has not had time to recover from excessive loads during the national team training camp. Then the coaching staff decided that Anton would not go to the 2009 World Championships in Pyeongchang, but would prepare with his personal coach for the European Championships. Having become a bronze medallist of the European Championships in Ufa in sprint and relay, the biathlete again got the right to start at the World Cup stages. He earned his first points in the World Cup standings in the pursuit race, where he finished 29th. With 12 points earned in the pursuit, the athlete finished the season in 93rd place in the overall World Cup standings.

He was the best Russian biathlon marksman in the same season (2009/2010). Shipulin won the bronze medal as part of the Russian men's relay team at the 2010 Winter Olympics. In the aftermath of the competition, he was awarded an order For Merit to the Fatherland by the Russian president.

Together with Evgeny Ustyugov, Alexey Volkov and Dmitry Malyshko he won the gold medal in the men's relay at the 2014 Winter Olympics, in Sochi, Russia.

His sister Anastasiya Kuzmina, (Slovak biathlete), is the Olympic champion in the 7.5 km sprint at the 2010 Winter Olympics in Vancouver, Canada, and at the 2014 Winter Olympics in Sochi, Russia and also Olympic champion in the 12.5 km mass start event from 2018 Winter Olympics in Pyeongchang, South Korea.

On 25 December 2018, Shipulin announced his retirement from sports after the World Team Challenge (Christmas Race).

== Biathlon results ==
All results are sourced from the International Biathlon Union.

=== Olympic Games ===
Event	Individual	Sprint	Pursuit	Mass start	Relay	Mixed relay
(Canada) 2010 Vancouver	36th	30th	20th	22nd	DSQ (Bronze)	—N/a*
(Russia) 2014 Sochi	—	4th	14th	11th	DSQ (Gold)	DSQ (4th)

* The mixed relay was added as an event in 2014.

=== World Championships ===
6 medals (1 gold, 2 silver, 3 bronze)

Event	Individual	Sprint	Pursuit	Mass start	Relay	Mixed relay
(Russia) 2011 Khanty-Mansiysk	—	37th	21st	—	DSQ (Silver)	—
(Germany) 2012 Ruhpolding	—	13th	Bronze	29th	6th	5th
(Czech Republic) 2013 Nové Město	33rd	7th	Bronze	Silver	4th	6th
(Finland) 2015 Kontiolahti	16th	18th	Silver	7th	4th	10th
(Norway) 2016 Oslo Holmenkollen	14th	45th	9th	9th	6th	7th
(Austria) 2017 Hochfilzen	7th	21st	4th	4th	Gold	Bronze

*During Olympic seasons competitions are only held for those events not included in the Olympic program.

=== Junior/Youth World Championships ===
6 medals (4 gold, 2 silver)

Event	Individual	Sprint	Pursuit	Relay
(Finland) 2005 Kontiolahti	—	7th	7th	5th
(United States) 2006 Presque Isle	18th	33rd	17th	Gold
(Italy) 2007 Martell-Val Martello	Silver	11th	5th	7th
(Germany) 2008 Ruhpolding	Silver	Gold	Gold	Gold

=== World Cup ===
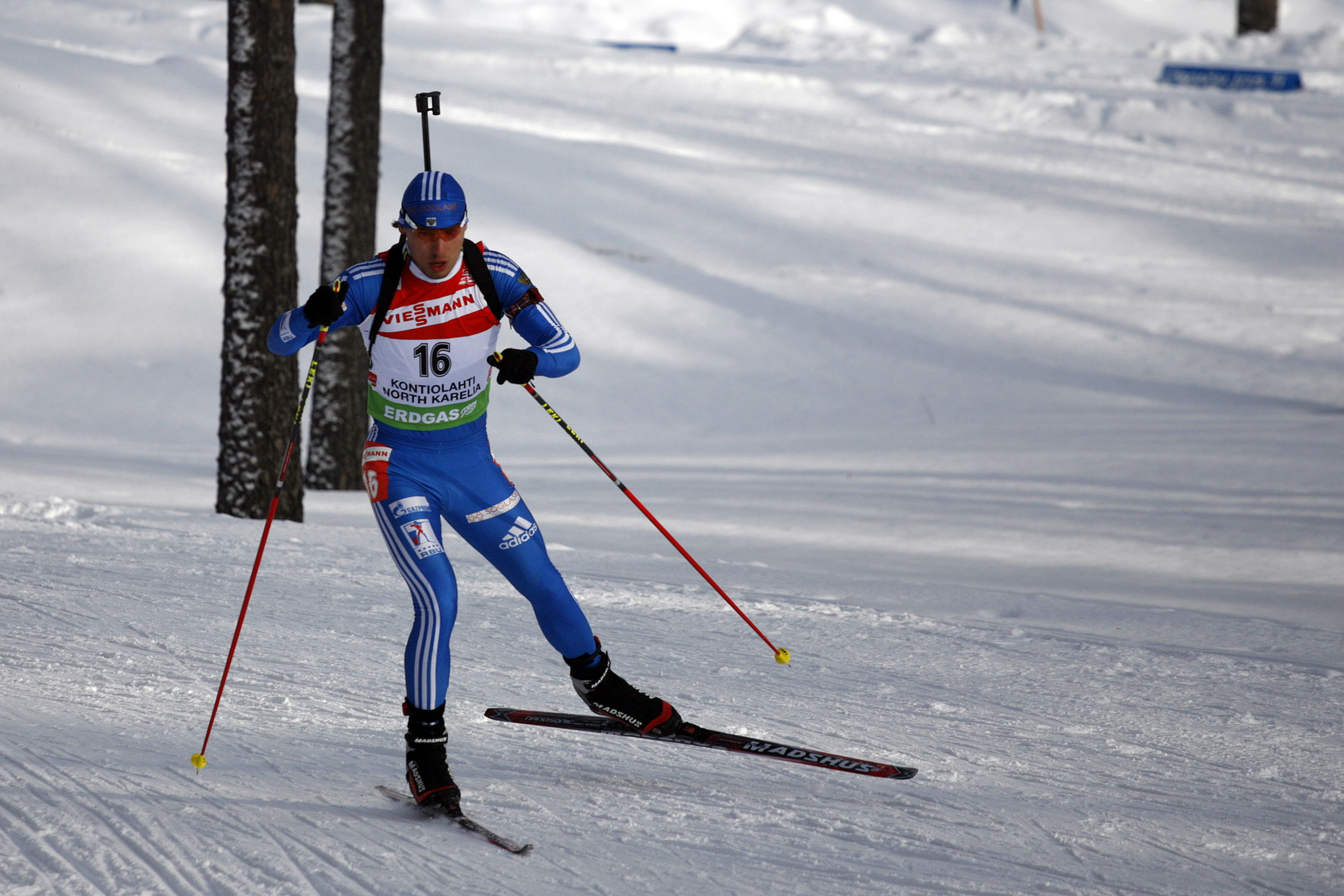

Season	Overall		Individual		Sprint		Pursuit		Mass start	
Season	Points	Position	Points	Position	Points	Position	Points	Position	Points	Position
2008–09	12	93rd	0	—N/a	0	—N/a	12	69th	0	—N/a
2009–10	374	23rd	39	36th	162	19th	84	23rd	89	22nd
2010–11	417	19th	71	20th	157	21st	110	21st	79	22nd
2011–12	637	8th	40	26th	201	17th	224	9th	172	5th
2012–13	628	9th	40	26th	211	14th	247	3rd	120	15th
2013–14	544	8th	21	35th	232	7th	234	3rd	57	23rd
2014–15	978	2nd	61	16th	370	2nd	305	2nd	242	1st
2015–16	806	3rd	100	4th	251	5th	300	2nd	155	3rd
2016–17	918	2nd	126	2nd	248	6th	392	2nd	177	3rd
2017–18	697	3rd	26	27th	256	4th	254	3rd	174	5th

=== Individual victories ===
11 victories (1 In, 4 Sp, 5 Pu, 1 MS)

Season	Date	Location	Discipline	Level
2010–11; 1 victory (1 Sp)	20 January 2011	(Italy) Antholz-Anterselva	10 km sprint	Biathlon World Cup
2011–12; 1 victory (1 Pu)	15 January 2012	(Czech Republic) Nové Město	12.5 km pursuit	Biathlon World Cup
2012–13; 2 victories (1 Sp, 1 Pu)	18 January 2013	(Italy) Antholz-Anterselva	10 km sprint	Biathlon World Cup
2012–13; 2 victories (1 Sp, 1 Pu)	19 January 2013	(Italy) Antholz-Anterselva	12.5 km pursuit	Biathlon World Cup
2013–14; 1 victory (1 Pu)	8 March 2014	(Slovenia) Pokljuka	12.5 km pursuit	Biathlon World Cup
2014–15; 2 victories (1 Sp, 1 MS)	19 December 2014	(Slovenia) Pokljuka	10 km sprint	Biathlon World Cup
2014–15; 2 victories (1 Sp, 1 MS)	21 December 2014	(Slovenia) Pokljuka	15 km mass start	Biathlon World Cup
2015–16; 1 victories (1 Pu)	23 January 2016	(Italy) Antholz-Anterselva	12.5 km pursuit	Biathlon World Cup
2016–17; 2 victories (1 In, 1 PU)	20 January 2017	(Italy) Antholz-Anterselva	20 km individual	Biathlon World Cup
2016–17; 2 victories (1 In, 1 PU)	18 March 2017	(Norway) Holmenkollen	12.5 km pursuit	Biathlon World Cup
2017–18; 1 victory (1 Sp)	8 March 2018	(Finland) Kontiolahti	10 km sprint	Biathlon World Cup

*Results are from UIPMB and IBU races which include the Biathlon World Cup, Biathlon World Championships and the Winter Olympic Games.

== Political career ==
In January 2019, Shipulin announced that he would be a candidate for the United Russia nomination in the 2019 State Duma by-election in Serov constituency. In the primary on 26 May, Shipulin defeated 5 other candidates, scoring 78.13% and won nomination for the United Russia. In the by-election on 8 September, Shipulin won, gaining 41.59%.

=== Sanctions ===
Shipulin was sanctioned by the United Kingdom government in 2022 in relation to the Russo–Ukrainian War.
