= Trams in Volchansk =

Public transport system in the Russian city of Volchansk

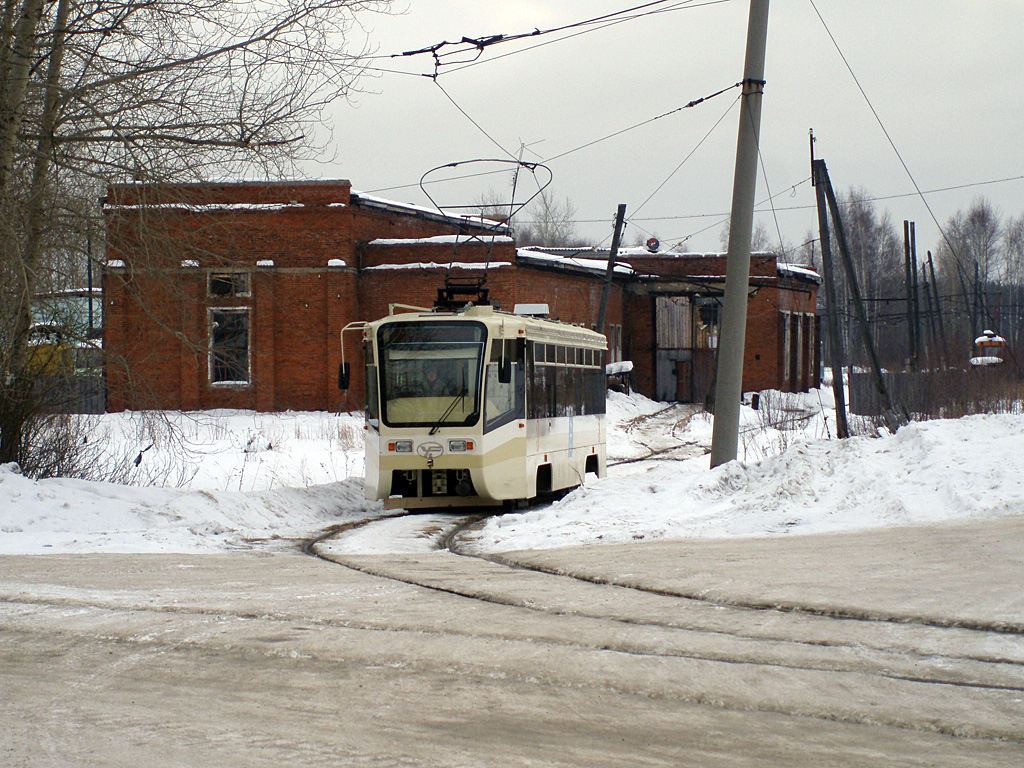
- Volchanka depot with a KTM-19 tram

Overview
- Status: Suspended since 28 April 2023, for track repair
- Owner: Volchansk Municipality
- Locale: Volchansk, Russia
- Termini: Lesnaya Volchanka (Volchansk); Volchanka
- Stations: 13

Service
- Type: Tramway
- Operator: MUP «Volchansky Avtoelektrotransport»
- Rolling stock: 2 passenger trams+1 MOW service

History
- Opened: 31 December 1951

Technical
- Line length: 8.7 km (5.4 mi)
- Num of tracks: Single track
- Track gauge: 1,524 mm (5 ft)
- Electrification: yes
Route map
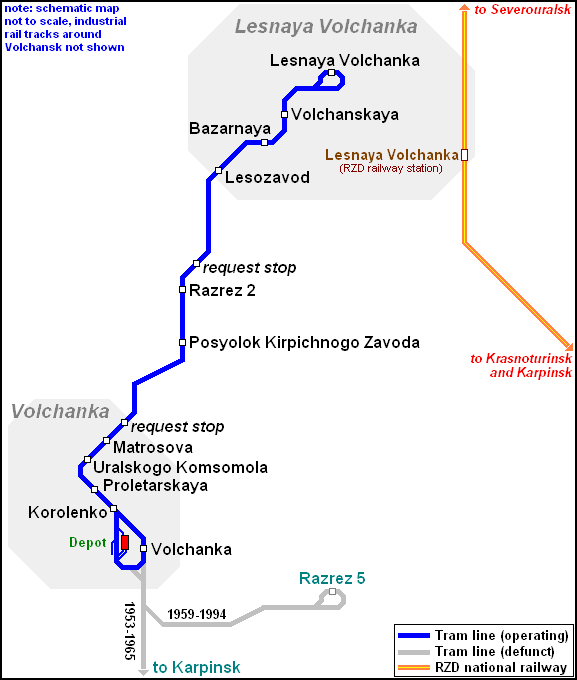

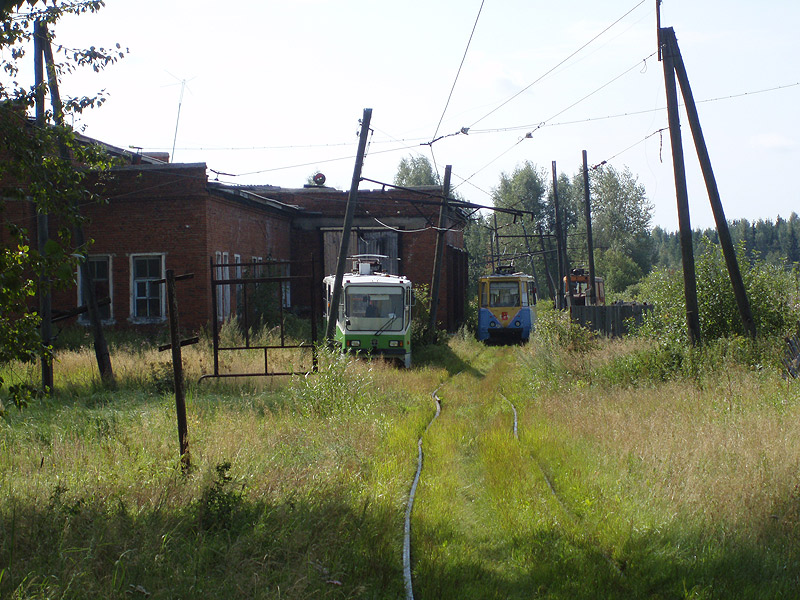
Volchanka tram depot

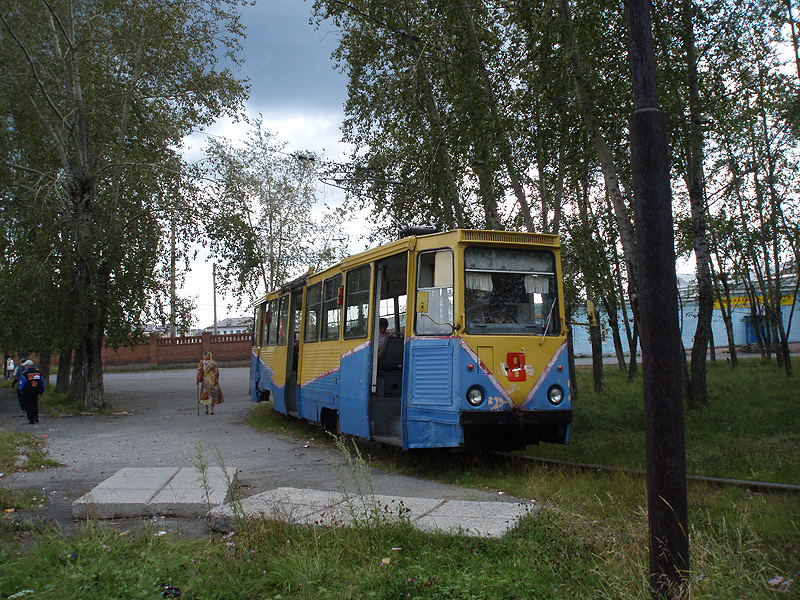
A yellow-blue KTM-5 tram

The Tram in Volchansk (Russian: Волчанский трамвай) is the primary transportation mode connecting the northern and southern regions of Sverdlovsk in Russia, specifically, the southern town of Volchansk and northern town of Lesnaya Volchanka. The tram has been in operation since December 31, 1951, and the system currently contains one line which is 8.7 kilometers long.

== History ==
Volchansk is the smallest Russian town with a tram. It is located 2105 km east of Moscow and 452 km north of Yekaterinburg. The Volchansk tram service started on December 31, 1951. At that time, Volchansk did not have the status of a "town". Reaching a peak population of around 36,000 people, it was declared a town in 1956.

At first, the line continued past Volchanka Depot to Opencast Colliery #5 (Razrez 5). This was closed in 1994 due to the theft of the trolley wire. There was also an inter-urban tram line to the neighboring town of Karpinsk, which had been working from 1953 to April 22, 1965. It was dismantled due to the transfer of a large walking excavator from Karpinsk to Volchansk along the road between these two towns.

Between November 7, 2020, and June 9, 2021, the tram system was suspended due to track repairs. However, the tram only runs on weekdays.

Since 28 April 2023, the line has been suspended again for track repair.

== Rolling stock ==
The rolling stock consists of two tramcars; 71-608KM is numbered 1 and the 71-619KT is numbered 3. An additional service KTM-5 is numbered 8.

Passenger tramcars are equipped with bow-type current collectors, which are suitable for operation on the existing catenary. It is planned to equip tramcars with modified pantographs adapted to work in local conditions.

The depot has a snow plow “GS-4” (no fleet number), though it is scrapped due to vandalism. Currently, a tractor is used to shovel snow off the track.

The body of a MTV-82 tramcar is used as a warehouse.

== World Record claim ==
Although it is not verifiable through the Guinness Book of World Records, local lore claims Volchansk is the smallest city in the world to have its own independent, stand-alone tram system although there are also other opinions stating that Woltersdorf or Bad Schandau are the smallest cities to have its own system. Volchansk citizens have applied to the Russian Records Book in order to have an official confirmation of their town as being the smallest in Russia with its own tram service.

== See also ==
- List of town tramway systems in Russia
