= Andrei Mironov (painter) =

Russian painter (born 1975)

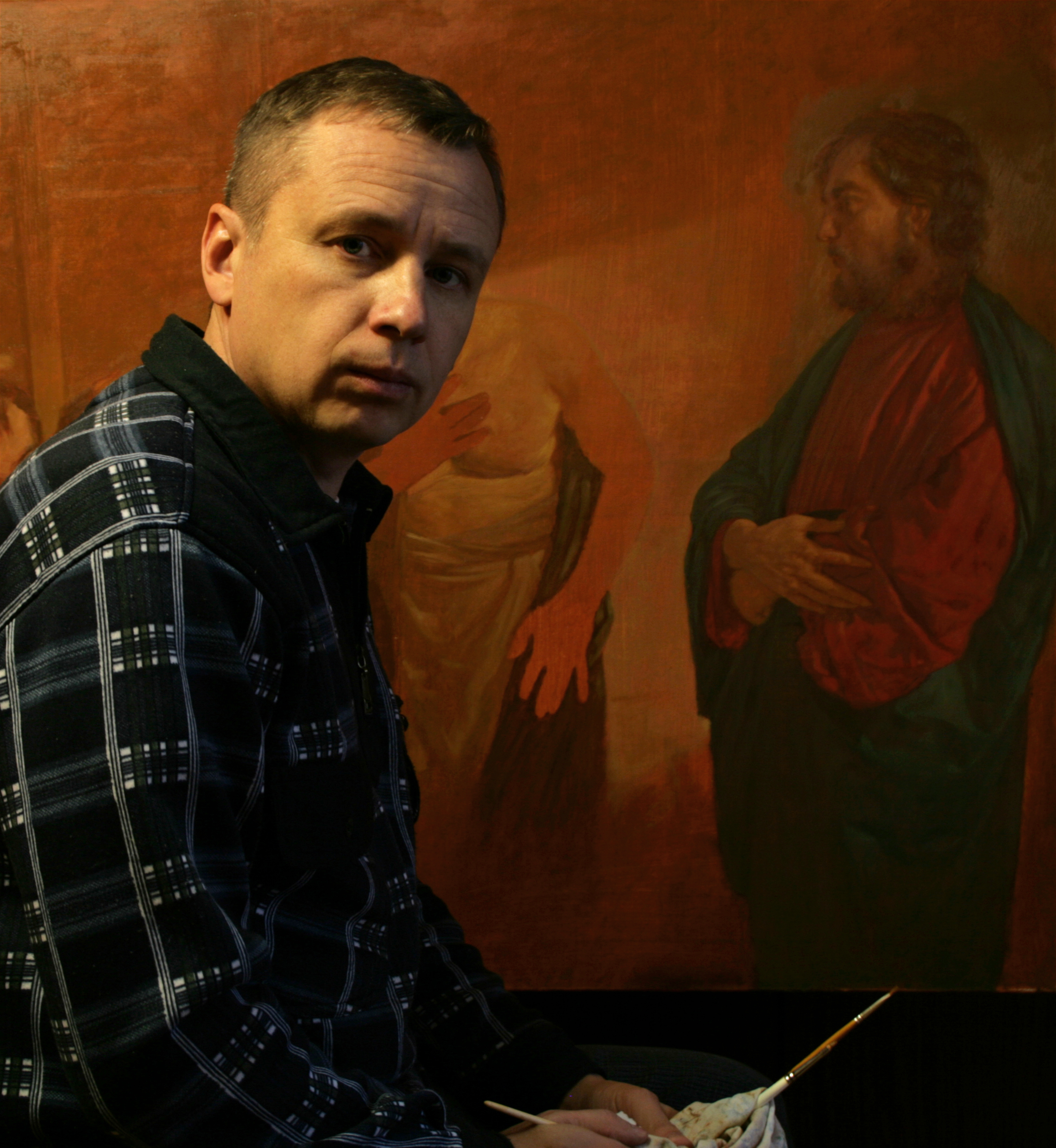
- Andrei Mironov in his studio, 2013
- Born: 20 April 1975 (age 51); Ryazan, Russian SFSR, Soviet Union
- Known for: Portrait painting, religious painting
- Website: artmiro.ru

Andrei Nikolayevich Mironov (Russian: Андре́й Никола́евич Миро́нов; born 20 April 1975) is a Russian artist. He is known mainly as a portrait painter, though he also works in the genre of religious painting.

== Early life and education ==
His father was a Soviet militia officer. Born in Ryazan, Andrei moved with his family to Ivdel (Sverdlovsk Oblast) in 1983. He graduated from a local secondary school in 1990 and in the same year he returned to his native city. One year later, he began to study at the PTU-3 in Ryazan. In the meantime, Mironov prepared himself to enter the Ryazan College of Art. However, due to his conscription into the Russian Army, he received his diploma in industrial design before completing the full PTU program.

He took part in the First Chechen War. After the war, he began a career as a militsia officer.

== Work and reception ==
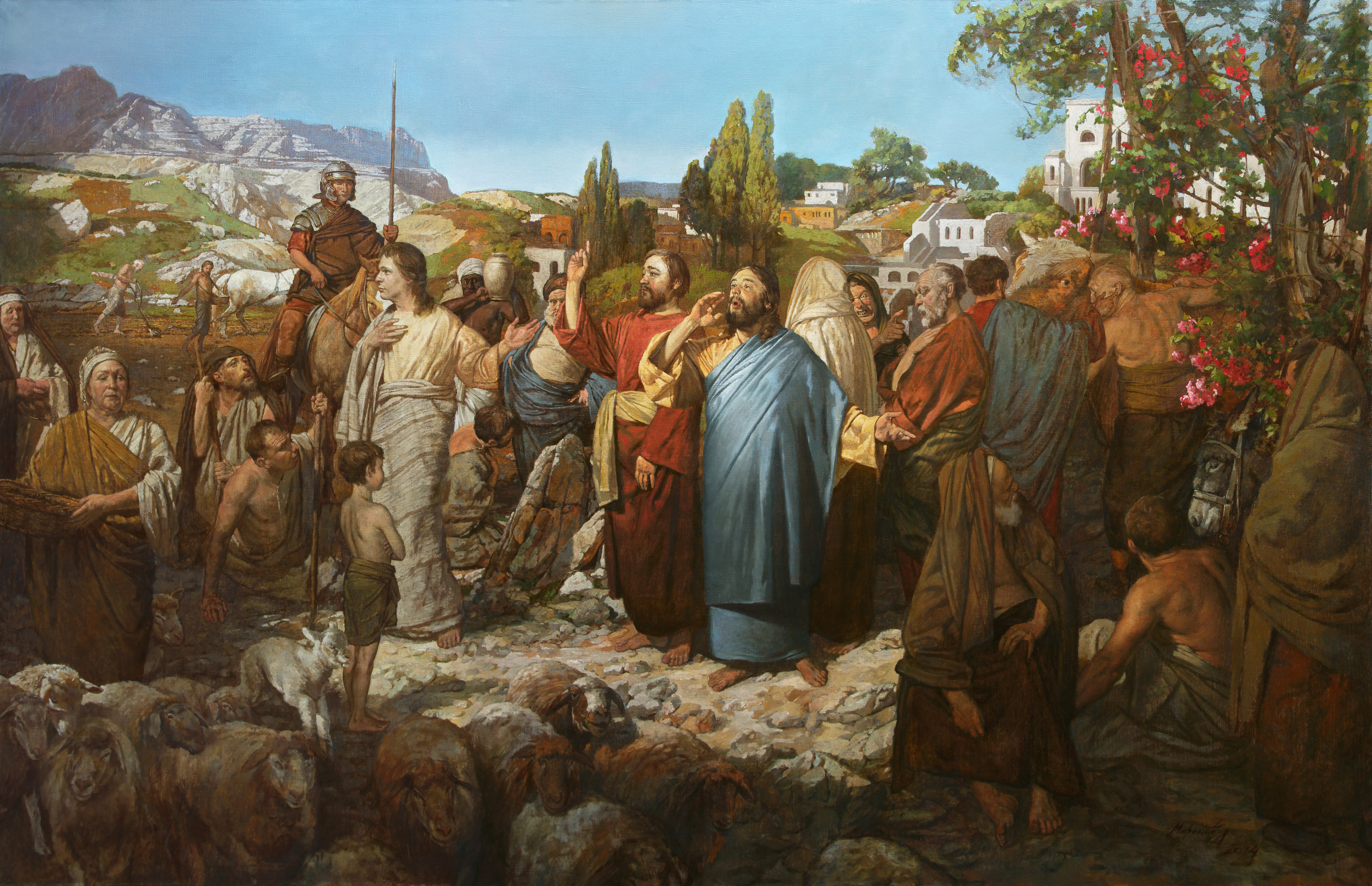
Parable of the Wedding Feast by Mironov

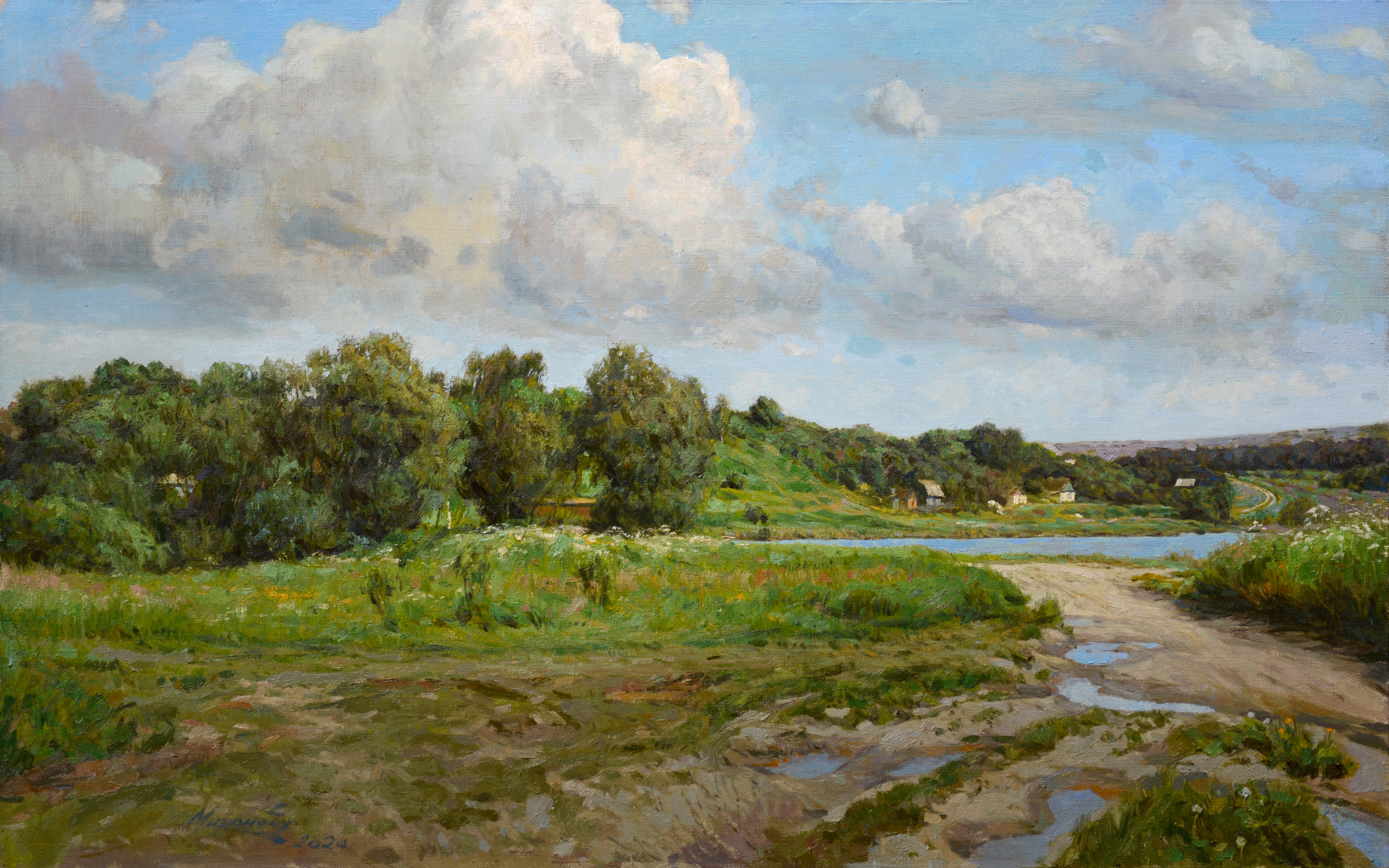
Neighborhood Of Ryazan. Bogatkovo by Mironov

Self-educated in painting, Mironov has worked as a portraitist since 2005. In 2007, he won the title "Profi" at Russian Art Week in Moscow. He has since participated in many exhibitions and increased the number of his clients.

His participation in the First Chechen War as well as his police work has had a considerable influence on his artistic development. The artist defined Christianity as "the main theme of his oeuvres". Some critics compare the "strangeness" of his paintings with the impression of the old masters' works.

Today his paintings are found in private collections, in the Kashira local museum, in the Monastery of Our Lady of Kazan and in the St. Nicholas Church in Yamskaya Sloboda (Ryazan).

Since 2008, he has been a member of the Moscow Union of Artists International Art Foundation.

== Selected exhibitions ==
- 2007 Russian Art Week, Moscow
- 2008 Death motifs in contemporary art, VVC, Moscow
- 2008 Gravitation, Central House of Artists, Moscow
- 2008 6th Vasily Popkov Exhibition, Central Cinema House, Moscow
- 2011 Doors, Local history museum, Kashira
- 2014, Seventh day, Youth movement history museum, Ryazan.
