= Ștefan Balmez =

Bessarabian Bulgarian politician (1882–after 1941)

Member of Sfatul Țării
- In office 1917–1918

Personal details
- Born: 1882 Chișinău, Bessarabia Governorate
- Died: Unknown
- Party: National Liberal Party (1937–1938)
- Other political affiliations: Russian Social Democratic Labour Party (Mensheviks) (before 1918)

Ștefan Balmez (born 1882 in Chișinău) was a Bessarabian Bulgarian politician.

== Biography ==
Before World War I, although working as Armaments Minister, Balmez was in the civil service. He served as Member of Sfatul Țării (the Parliament of Bessarabia) in 1917–1918. He was one of three deputies who voted against the accession of Bessarabia to Romania on 27 March 1918. After the Soviet occupation of Bessarabia and Northern Bukovina in June 1940, Balamez was arrested on 28 June 1941 by the NKVD. Due to the outbreak of hostilities on the Eastern Front, he was evacuated to the executive labor camp Ivdel in Siberia, where he was sentenced to 10 years on the count of participation in counter-revolutionary activity. His subsequent destiny is unknown. Balamez was rehabilitated by the Moldavian SSR Prosecutor's Office on 10 May 1989, in accordance with the Decree of the Presidium of the Supreme Soviet of the USSR of 16 January 1989.

== Bibliography ==
- Gheorghe E. Cojocaru, Sfatul Țării: itinerar, Civitas, Chișinău, 1998, ISBN 9975-936-20-2
- Mihai Tașcă, Sfatul Țării și actualele autorități locale, Timpul de dimineață, no. 114 (849), June 27, 2008 (page 16)
