= Verkhnesaldinsky District =

District in Sverdlovsk Oblast, Russia

Verkhnesaldinsky District Верхнесалдинский район (Russian)
- District
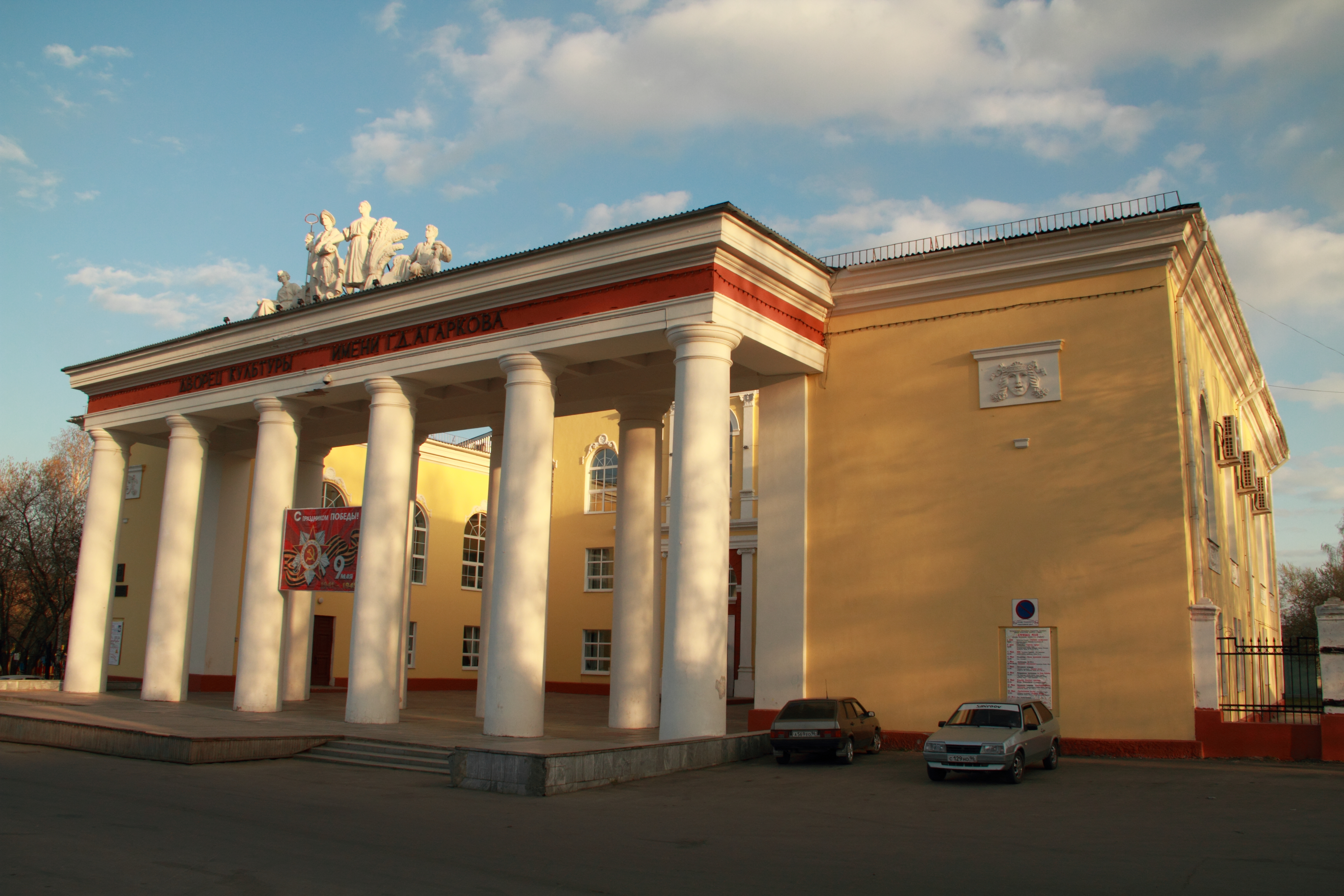
- Palace of Culture, in Verhnesaldinsky District

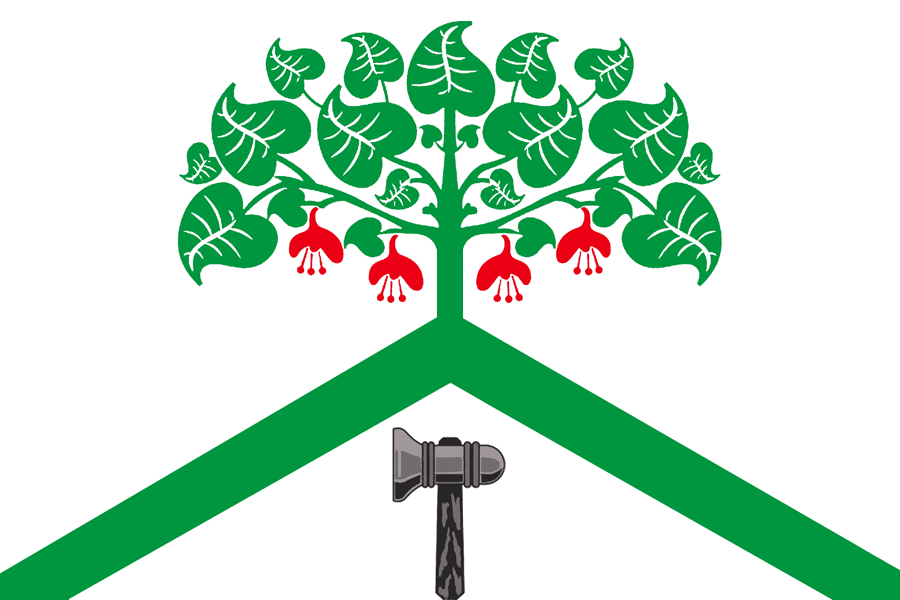
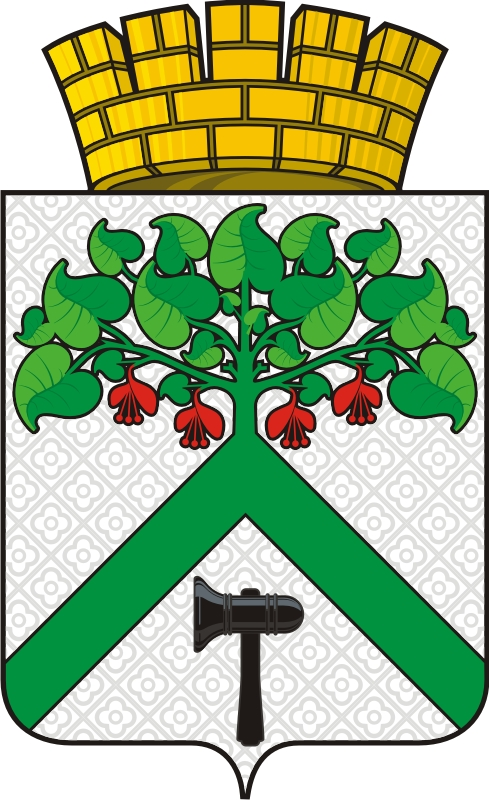
- Flag Coat of arms
- Location of Verkhnesaldinsky District in Sverdlovsk Oblast
- Coordinates: 58.190°N 60.659°E
- Country: Russia
- Federal subject: Sverdlovsk Oblast
- Administrative center: Verkhnyaya Salda

Population (2010 Census)
  - Total: 3,306
  - Urban: 0%
  - Rural: 100%

Administrative structure
  - Administrative divisions: 1 Urban-type settlements of district significance, 4 Selsoviets
  - Inhabited localities: 1 cities/towns, 18 rural localities

Municipal structure
  - Municipally incorporated as: Verkhnesaldinsky Urban Okrug
- Time zone: UTC+5 (MSK+2)
- OKTMO ID: 65708000
- Website: http://v-salda.ru/

Verkhnesaldinsky District (Russian: Верхнесалдинский райо́н) is an administrative district (raion), one of the thirty in Sverdlovsk Oblast, Russia. As a municipal division, it is incorporated as Verkhnesaldinsky Urban Okrug. Its administrative center is the town of Verkhnyaya Salda. Population (excluding the administrative center): 3,306 (2010 Census); 3,669 (2002 census); 26,470 (1989 Soviet census).
