= Volchansk =

Town in Sverdlovsk Oblast, Russia

Volchansk Волчанск
- Town
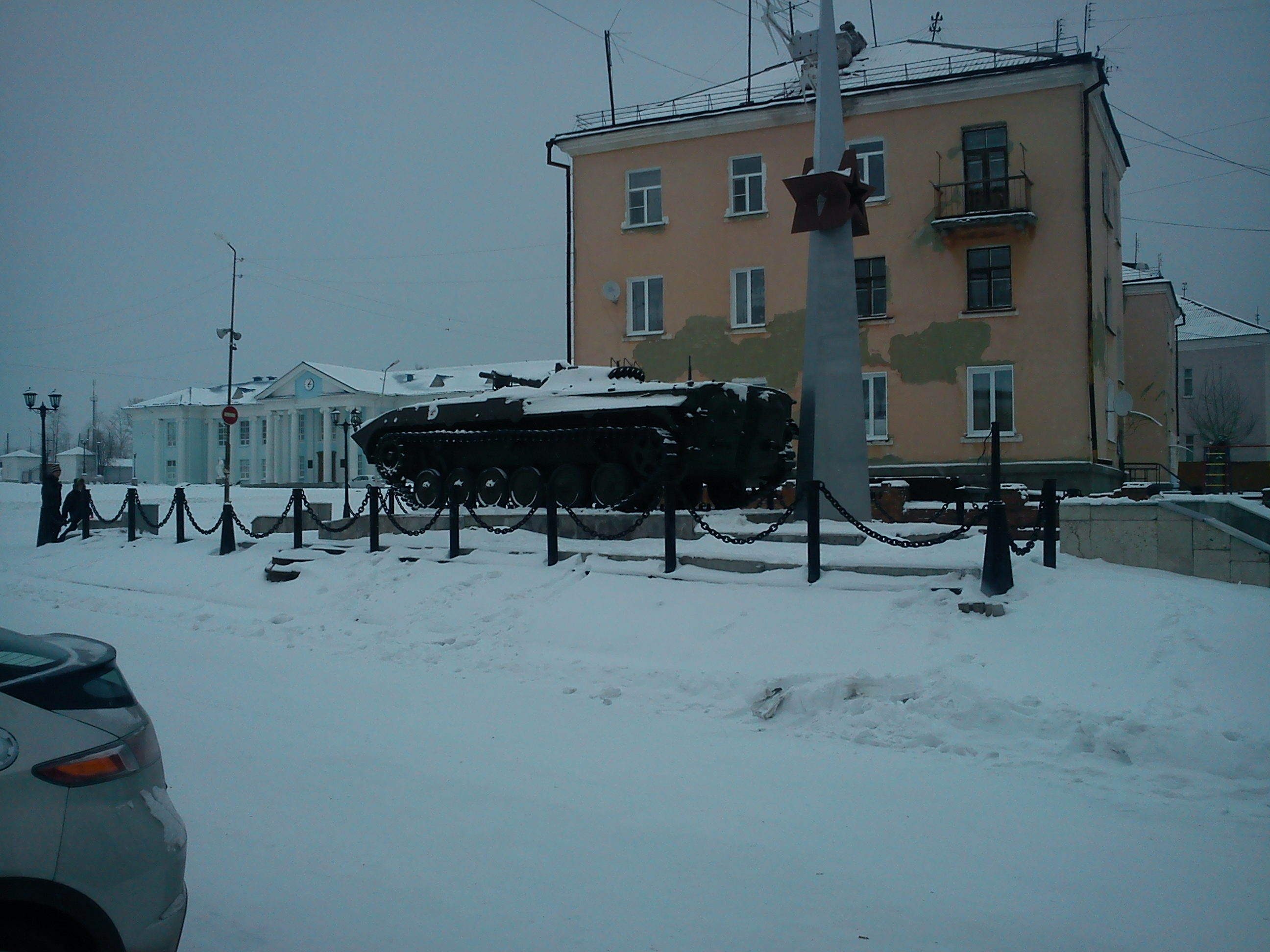
- A view near Fontannaya Square in Volchansk

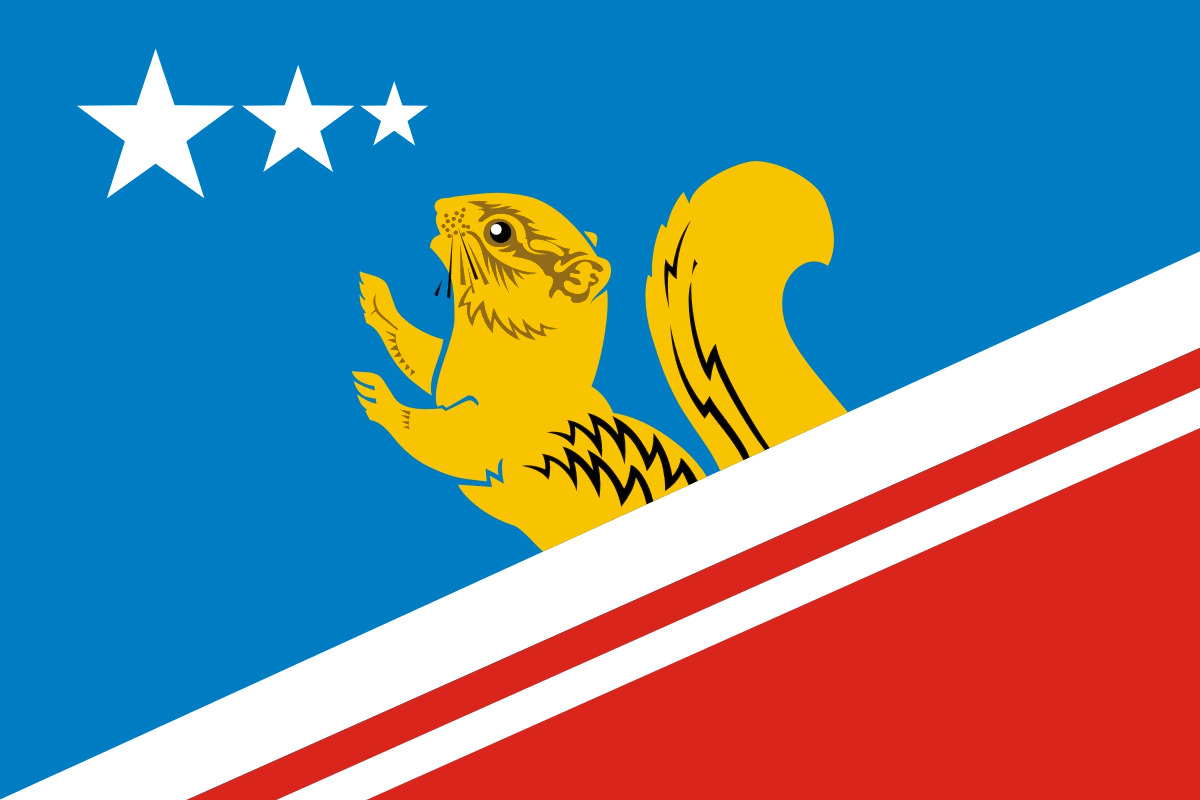
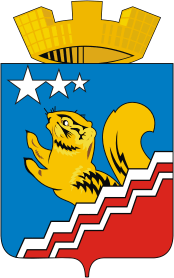
- Flag Coat of arms
- Interactive map of Volchansk
- Location of Volchansk Volchansk (Sverdlovsk Oblast)
- Coordinates: 59°56′N 60°05′E
- Country: Russia
- Federal subject: Sverdlovsk Oblast
- Founded: 1850
- Town status since: 1956
- Elevation: 240 m (790 ft)

Population (2010 Census)
  - Total: 10,010
  - Estimate (2025): 8,304 (−17%)

Administrative status
  - Subordinated to: Town of Karpinsk

Municipal status
  - Urban okrug: Volchansky Urban Okrug
  - Capital of: Volchansky Urban Okrug
- Time zone: UTC+5 (MSK+2)
- Postal codes: 624940, 624941
- Dialing code: +7 34383
- OKTMO ID: 65735000001

Volchansk (Russian: Волча́нск) is a town under the administrative jurisdiction of the Town of Karpinsk in Sverdlovsk Oblast, Russia, located on the Volchanka River (a right tributary of the Sosva in the Ob's basin), 452 kilometers (281 mi) north of Yekaterinburg, the administrative center of the oblast. Population: 10,010 (2010 census); 11,043 (2002 census); 14,814 (1989 Soviet census).

Historical population
Year	Pop.	±%
1959	25,031	—
1970	18,257	−27.1%
1979	14,819	−18.8%
1989	14,814	−0.0%
2002	11,043	−25.5%
2010	10,010	−9.4%
2021	8,573	−14.4%
Source: Censuses

== Geography ==
The town consists of two parts: Lesnaya Volchanka in the north (or Volchansk proper) and Volchanka in the south.

== History ==
The town status was granted to Volchansk in 1956.

== Administrative and municipal status ==
Within the framework of the administrative divisions, it is, together with ten rural localities, subordinated to the Town of Karpinsk—an administrative unit with the status equal to that of the districts. As a municipal division, Volchansk, together with two rural localities under the administrative jurisdiction of the Town of Karpinsk, is incorporated as Volchansky Urban Okrug. Karpinsk and eight other rural localities are incorporated separately as Karpinsk Urban Okrug.

== Economy ==
- factory of consumer goods
- dressing mill
- brickyard
- extraction of brown coal (terminated)
- asphalt plant

=== Transportation ===
A tram system started operating in Volchansk on December 31, 1951. The total length of the tram line is about 7 kilometers (4.3 mi).
