= Verkhnyaya Sinyachikha =

Urban-type settlement in Sverdlovsk Oblast, Russia

Verkhnyaya Sinyachikha Верхняя Синячиха
- Urban-type settlement
- Interactive map of Verkhnyaya Sinyachikha
- Location of Verkhnyaya Sinyachikha Verkhnyaya Sinyachikha (Sverdlovsk Oblast)
- Coordinates: 57.9842°N 61.6714°E
- Country: Russia
- Federal subject: Sverdlovsk Oblast
- Administrative district: Alapayevsky District
- Founded: 1769

Population (2010 Census)
  - Total: 9,999
  - Estimate (2025): 9,310 (−6.9%)
- Time zone: UTC+5 (MSK+2)
- Postal code: 624690
- OKTMO ID: 65771000051

Verkhnyaya Sinyachikha (Russian: Верхняя Синячиха) is an urban locality (an urban-type settlement) in Alapayevsky District of Sverdlovsk Oblast, Russia. Population: 9,999 (2010 census); 11,147 (2002 census); 11,957 (1989 Soviet census).
