= Sosva, Serovsky District, Sverdlovsk Oblast =

Urban-type settlement in Sverdlovsk Oblast, Russia

Sosva Сосьва
- Urban-type settlement
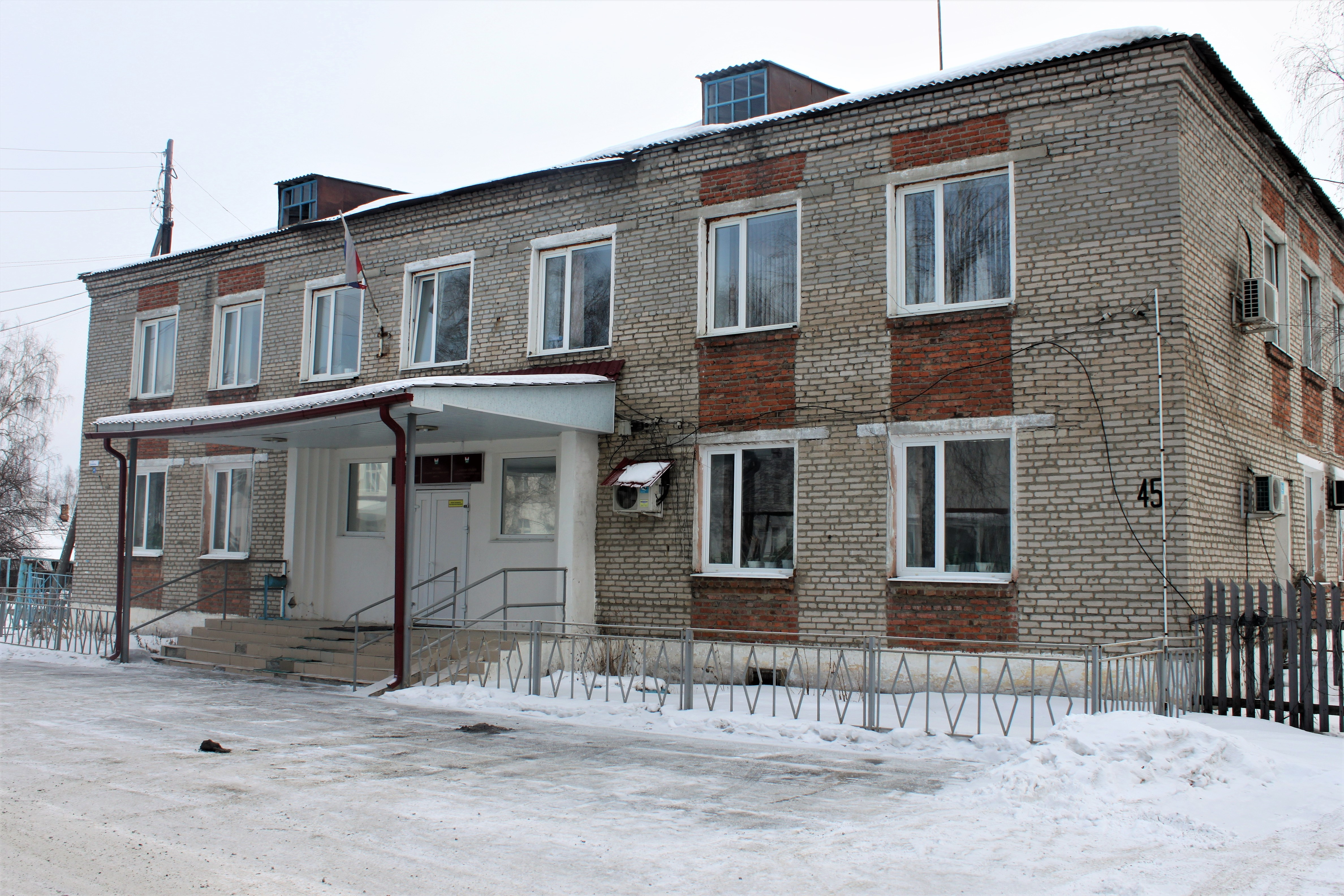
- Town hall

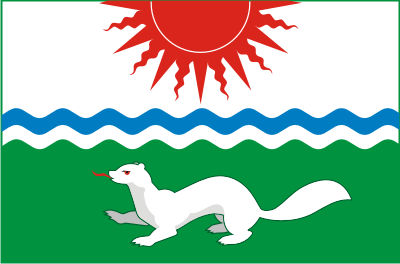
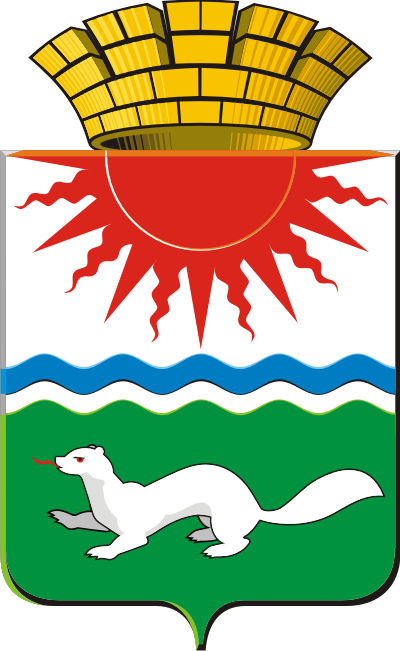
- Flag Coat of arms
- Interactive map of Sosva
- Location of Sosva Sosva (Sverdlovsk Oblast)
- Coordinates: 59.1734°N 61.8628°E
- Country: Russia
- Federal subject: Sverdlovsk Oblast
- Administrative district: Serovsky District
- Founded: 1938

Population (2010 Census)
  - Total: 9,634
  - Estimate (2025): 6,785 (−29.6%)
- Time zone: UTC+5 (MSK+2)
- Postal code: 624971
- OKTMO ID: 65721000051

Sosva (Russian: Сосьва) is an urban locality (an urban-type settlement) in Serovsky District of Sverdlovsk Oblast, Russia. Population: 9,634 (2010 census); 10,341 (2002 census); 10,412 (1989 Soviet census).
