= Ivdel =

Town in Sverdlovsk Oblast, Russia

Ivdel Ивдель (Russian) Са̄пса, Ню̄рум-Во̄ль-Ӯс (Mansi)
- Town
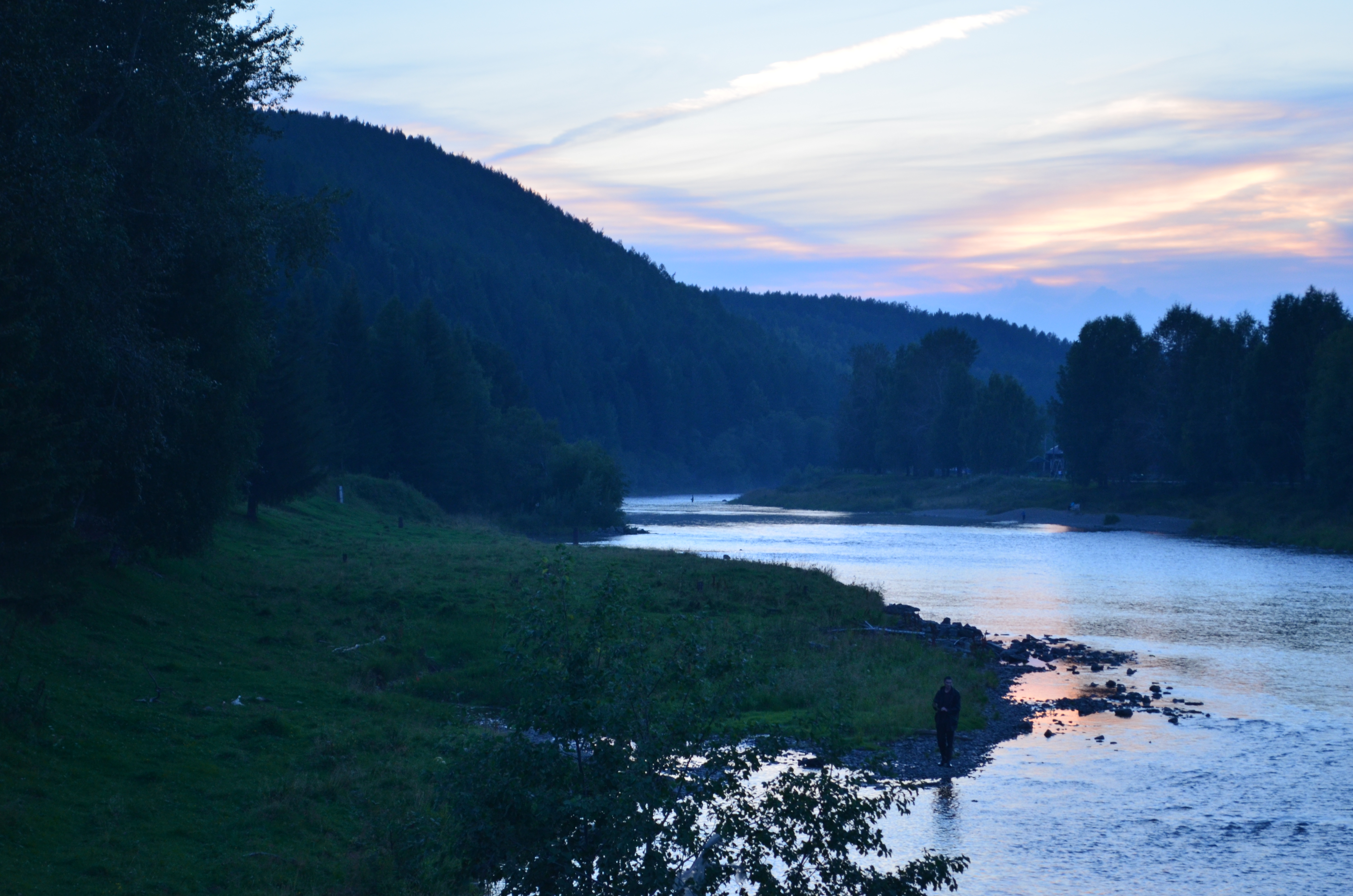

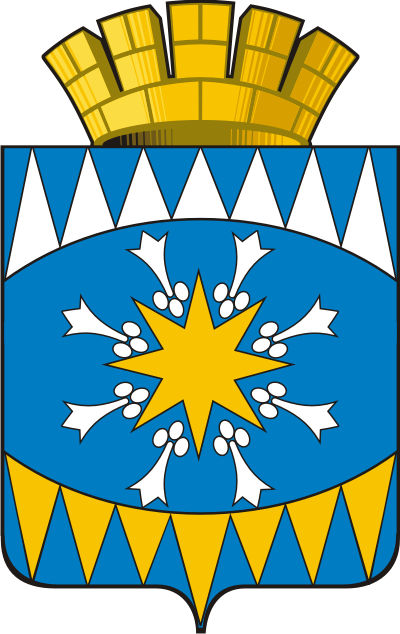
- Flag Coat of arms
- Interactive map of Ivdel
- Location of Ivdel Ivdel (Sverdlovsk Oblast)
- Coordinates: 60°41′N 60°25′E
- Country: Russia
- Federal subject: Sverdlovsk Oblast
- Founded: 1589
- Town status since: 1943
- Elevation: 80 m (260 ft)

Population (2010 Census)
  - Total: 17,775
  - Estimate (2025): 13,708 (−22.9%)

Administrative status
  - Subordinated to: Town of Ivdel
  - Capital of: Town of Ivdel

Municipal status
  - Urban okrug: Ivdelsky Urban Okrug
  - Capital of: Ivdelsky Urban Okrug
- Time zone: UTC+5 (MSK+2)
- Postal code: 624590–624595
- OKTMO ID: 65738000001
- Website: www.admivdel.ru

Ivdel (Russian: Ивдель; Mansi: Са̄пса Sāpsa) is a town in Sverdlovsk Oblast, Russia, located on the Ivdel River (Ob's basin) near its confluence with the Lozva River, 535 kilometers (332 mi) north of Yekaterinburg, the administrative center of the oblast. Population: 17,775 (2010 census); 19,324 (2002 census); 19,014 (1989 Soviet census).

== History ==
Lozvinsky gorodok (Лозьвинский городок), the first Russian wooden fortress east of the Ural Mountains, was built in 1589 on the eastern bank of the Ivdel-Lozva river confluence, about 9 kilometres southeast of today's Ivdel. It was known as a gold-mining settlement of Nikito-Ivdel (Никито-Ивдель), and later Ivdel, since 1831. Ivdellag gulag was formed here in 1937. Town status was granted in 1943.

== Administrative and municipal status ==
Within the framework of the administrative divisions, it is, together with the work settlement of Pelym and thirty-three rural localities, incorporated as the Town of Ivdel—an administrative unit with the status equal to that of the districts. As a municipal division, Ivdel and twenty-nine rural localities are incorporated as Ivdelsky Urban Okrug. The urban-type settlement of Pelym, together with four other rural localities, is incorporated separately as Pelym Urban Okrug.

== Climate ==
Ivdel has a subarctic climate (Köppen climate classification Dfc), with long, cold winters and short, mild warm summers. Precipitation is moderate and is somewhat higher in summer than at other times of the year.

Climate data for Ivdel (1991-2020, extremes 1934-present)
Month	Jan	Feb	Mar	Apr	May	Jun	Jul	Aug	Sep	Oct	Nov	Dec	Year
Record high °C (°F)	5.0 (41.0)	9.0 (48.2)	16.9 (62.4)	26.6 (79.9)	34.3 (93.7)	35.1 (95.2)	35.9 (96.6)	34.8 (94.6)	30.3 (86.5)	23.4 (74.1)	10.2 (50.4)	6.2 (43.2)	35.9 (96.6)
Mean daily maximum °C (°F)	−13.2 (8.2)	−9.3 (15.3)	0.0 (32.0)	7.6 (45.7)	15.9 (60.6)	21.3 (70.3)	23.9 (75.0)	19.5 (67.1)	13.1 (55.6)	5.2 (41.4)	−5.4 (22.3)	−11.1 (12.0)	5.6 (42.1)
Daily mean °C (°F)	−18.2 (−0.8)	−15.3 (4.5)	−5.9 (21.4)	1.8 (35.2)	9.0 (48.2)	14.9 (58.8)	17.6 (63.7)	14.0 (57.2)	8.2 (46.8)	1.4 (34.5)	−9.2 (15.4)	−15.5 (4.1)	0.2 (32.4)
Mean daily minimum °C (°F)	−23.3 (−9.9)	−21.0 (−5.8)	−11.9 (10.6)	−3.7 (25.3)	2.4 (36.3)	8.7 (47.7)	11.5 (52.7)	8.7 (47.7)	4.0 (39.2)	−2.1 (28.2)	−13.2 (8.2)	−20.3 (−4.5)	−5.0 (23.0)
Record low °C (°F)	−49.0 (−56.2)	−46.6 (−51.9)	−44.7 (−48.5)	−30.4 (−22.7)	−12.6 (9.3)	−4.4 (24.1)	−0.4 (31.3)	−3.1 (26.4)	−8.5 (16.7)	−29.0 (−20.2)	−44.9 (−48.8)	−48.6 (−55.5)	−49.0 (−56.2)
Average precipitation mm (inches)	26 (1.0)	20 (0.8)	25 (1.0)	37 (1.5)	54 (2.1)	74 (2.9)	78 (3.1)	78 (3.1)	68 (2.7)	38 (1.5)	32 (1.3)	23 (0.9)	553 (21.9)
Average precipitation days (≥ 1.0mm)	8	6	6	7	9	10	9	10	10	9	8	7	99
Mean monthly sunshine hours	57.7	105.1	155.0	196.0	260.6	273.4	291.4	207.9	125.2	88.2	57.0	42.1	1,859.6
Source 1: NOAA
Source 2: pogoda.ru.net

== Notable people ==
- Ștefan Balmez - Bessarabian Bulgarian politician who was imprisoned at the labor camp in Ivdel
- Iryna Bekeshkina - Ukrainian sociologist and political scholar
- Andrei Mironov - Russian artist
- Ștefan Pirogan - Romanian politician who died in imprisonment at Ivdel
- Andrei Timofeyev - Russian football player
