= Krasnouralsk =

Town in Sverdlovsk Oblast, Russia

Krasnouralsk Красноуральск
- Town
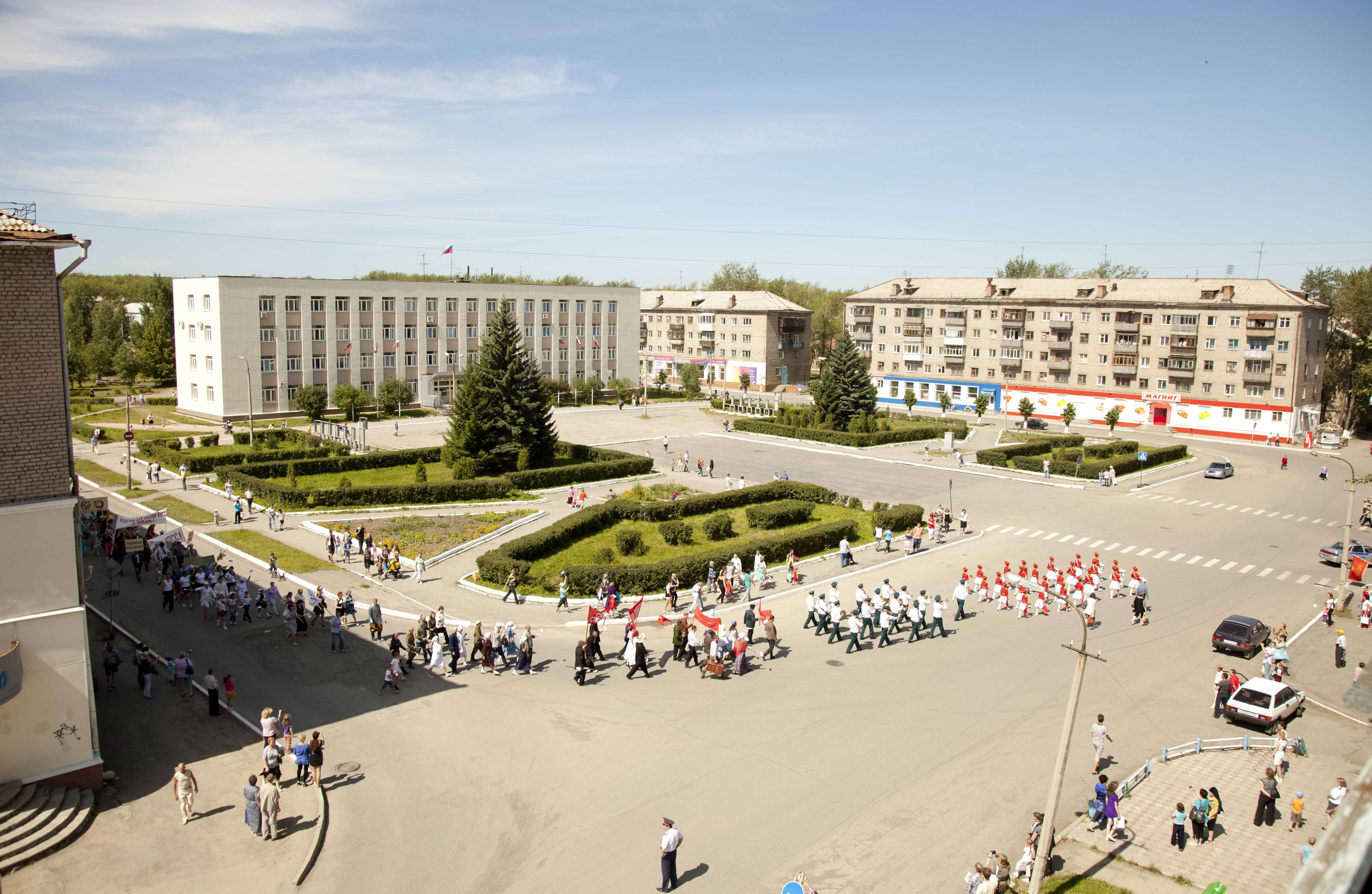
- In Krasnouralsk

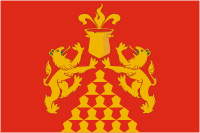
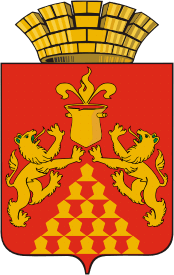
- Flag Coat of arms
- Interactive map of Krasnouralsk
- Location of Krasnouralsk Krasnouralsk (Sverdlovsk Oblast)
- Coordinates: 58°21′N 60°03′E
- Country: Russia
- Federal subject: Sverdlovsk Oblast
- Founded: 1832
- Town status since: 1932
- Elevation: 220 m (720 ft)

Population (2010 Census)
  - Total: 24,980
  - Estimate (2025): 21,159 (−15.3%)

Administrative status
  - Subordinated to: Town of Krasnouralsk
  - Capital of: Town of Krasnouralsk

Municipal status
  - Urban okrug: Krasnouralsk Urban Okrug
  - Capital of: Krasnouralsk Urban Okrug
- Time zone: UTC+5 (MSK+2)
- Postal codes: 624330, 624332–624335
- Dialing code: +7 34343
- OKTMO ID: 65746000001

Krasnouralsk population
- 2010 Census: 24,980
- 2002 Census: 28,961
- 1989 Census: 35,284
- 1979 Census: 38,235

Krasnouralsk (Russian: Красноура́льск) is a town in Sverdlovsk Oblast, Russia. As of the 2010 Census, its population was 24,980.

== History ==
The first settlement on the site of the future Krasnouralsk was formed in 1832. At first, the residents' forces were directed at satisfying the needs of the factories, the preparation of charcoal. In the 1820s, gold mining began at the Salda River and its sources: more than 100 mines were discovered. In 1843, deposits of copper pyrites were found on the Kushayka River. And in 1875, the development of ore gold began at the mines of the merchant I.P. Bogomolov, whose name was later named the famous copper-pyritic Bogomolovskoye deposit. In 1925, the construction of the country's largest copper smelting plant began on the basis of the Bogomolovsky deposit, in connection with the beginning of development Krasnogvardeysky deposits of copper ore along with which the construction of the eponymous workers' village began. and the construction of smelter, the settlement of Bogomolstroy was founded. In 1929, it was renamed Uralmedstroy (Russian: Уралмедьстрой). In 1931, the smelter was commissioned. In 1931, Uralmedstroy was granted work settlement status and renamed Krasnouralsk. Town status was granted in 1932.

At the time of commencement of construction, “of the residential buildings there were only three houses at the Krasnogvardeisky mine and two houses at Kushayka. At the XVI Party Congress, one of the leaders of the economic complex of the Ural Region V.N. Andronikov complained about pests, in particular, about a delay in launching the Krasnouralsk Combine.

Krasnouralsk included the settlement of the metallurgical plant, and two mining villages, Krasnogvardeysky and Novo-Levinsky, located in close proximity. All these villages and industrial facilities (to which the chemical plant under construction should be added) formed a single city.

=== Construction of the modern city ===
The city center was a rectangular factory square formed by Lenin and Kirov streets and stretching from the northwest to the southeast. From the southeast, a three-story factory building and factory walkways entered the square. Around the square, according to the not entirely correct radial beam pattern, there is a factory village built entirely in the 1930s. And almost completely (with the deduction, of course, of a barracks building) preserved to this day, down to utility sheds in the courtyards of two-story buildings.

The public infrastructure was located in the southern part of the city in relation to the factory area, along two streets leading to the railway station Copper - Sovetskaya and Kalinin.

Here there were a city council, a bank, a technical school, a bathhouse, and a department store. The preserved capital development is represented by two-story as there were no three-story residential buildings in Krasnouralsk, with the exception of a large engineering house in the northern part.

It was assumed that the socialist city will be completed simultaneously with the plant. Socio-cultural construction was planned, according to the capital construction plan for 1931

As in most cases at other construction sites, preparation plant to start absorbed all the resources and strength of the builders. Housing and communal services were abandoned. In 1931, the Krasnouralsk water supply facility was launched, stretching 11 km to the Tura River.

On November 14, 1931, a large editorial appeared in 'Gigant' newspaper claiming "The socialist combine needs a socialist city". Determining the urgent tasks of construction. In 1931, it was planned to complete 60 houses, a club, a bathhouse, a public works station and a department store. In 1932, 125 new houses, a sewer, public work station No. 2, two movie clubs, a laundry room, a kitchen factory, hospital campus, several canteens, kindergartens and nurseries).

=== World War II ===
At the beginning of World War II, the construction of a chemical plant began on the territory of Krasnouralsk. On the instructions of the government, in the last month of the summer of 1941, a defense workshop was built, in the walls of which shells were made for Katyusha. Krasnouralsk citizens enriched the country's defense fund by 27 million rubles, which went to the construction of the Krasnouralsky Craftsman and Sovetsky Mednik aircraft, as well as to the Krasnouralsk air connection.

=== Postwar ===
On July 30, 1957, in order to better organize the work of all production links, the Krasnouralsky smelter was established, combining the Krasnouralsk ore management, chemical and copper plants. Georgy Baiderin was put at the head of the plant. In 1993, the city-forming enterprise was transformed into Svyatogor OJSC as part of the UMMC-Holding.

On February 1, 1963, the Council of Workers 'Deputies of the city of Krasnouralsk was subordinated to the Sverdlovsk Regional Council of Workers' Deputies.

== Administrative and municipal status ==
Within the framework of the administrative divisions, it is, together with ten rural localities, incorporated as the Town of Krasnouralsk—an administrative unit with the status equal to that of the districts. As a municipal division, the Town of Krasnouralsk is incorporated as Krasnouralsk Urban Okrug.

== Notable people ==
Cosmonaut Vitaly Sevastyanov was born here.
