= Serovsky (rural locality) =

Name of several Russian rural localities

Serovsky (Russian: Серовский; masculine), Serovskaya (Серовская; feminine), or Serovskoye (Серовское; neuter) is the name of several rural localities in Ryazan Oblast, Russia:

- Serovskoye, Ryazansky District, Ryazan Oblast, a village in Semenovsky Rural Okrug of Ryazansky District
- Serovskoye, Sasovsky District, Ryazan Oblast, a village in Malostudenetsky Rural Okrug of Sasovsky District
