= Pelym, Ivdel, Sverdlovsk Oblast =

Work settlement in Sverdlovsk Oblast, Russia

Pelym Пелым
- Work settlement
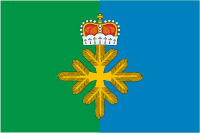
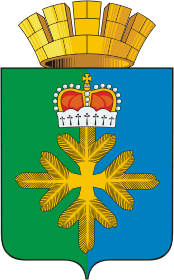
- Flag Coat of arms
- Interactive map of Pelym
- Location of Pelym Pelym (Sverdlovsk Oblast)
- Coordinates: 61°01′00″N 61°59′30″E
- Country: Russia
- Federal subject: Sverdlovsk Oblast
- Founded: 1962

Population (2010 Census)
  - Total: 3,376
  - Estimate (2025): 2,754 (−18.4%)

Administrative status
  - Subordinated to: Town of Ivdel

Municipal status
  - Urban okrug: Pelym Urban Okrug
  - Capital of: Pelym Urban Okrug
- Time zone: UTC+5 (MSK+2)
- Postal code: 624582
- OKTMO ID: 65764000051

Pelym (Russian: Пелым) is an urban locality (a work settlement) under the administrative jurisdiction of the Town of Ivdel in Sverdlovsk Oblast, Russia. Population: 3,376 (2010 census); 3,708 (2002 census).

Pelym was established in 1962 as a logging town. It takes its name from a much older settlement, Pelym, Garinsky District, Sverdlovsk Oblast, which goes back to the 16th century and used to be prominent as a place of exile. A Gazprom office and an airport are located in Pelym.

Within the framework of the administrative divisions, Pelym and thirty-seven rural localities are subordinated to the Town of Ivdel – an administrative unit with the status equal to that of the districts. As a municipal division, Pelym, together with four rural localities under the administrative jurisdiction of the Town of Ivdel, is incorporated separately as Pelym Urban Okrug. Ivdel and the other thirty-three rural localities are incorporated separately as Ivdelsky Urban Okrug.
