= Karpinsk =

Town in Sverdlovsk Oblast, Russia

Karpinsk Карпинск
- Town
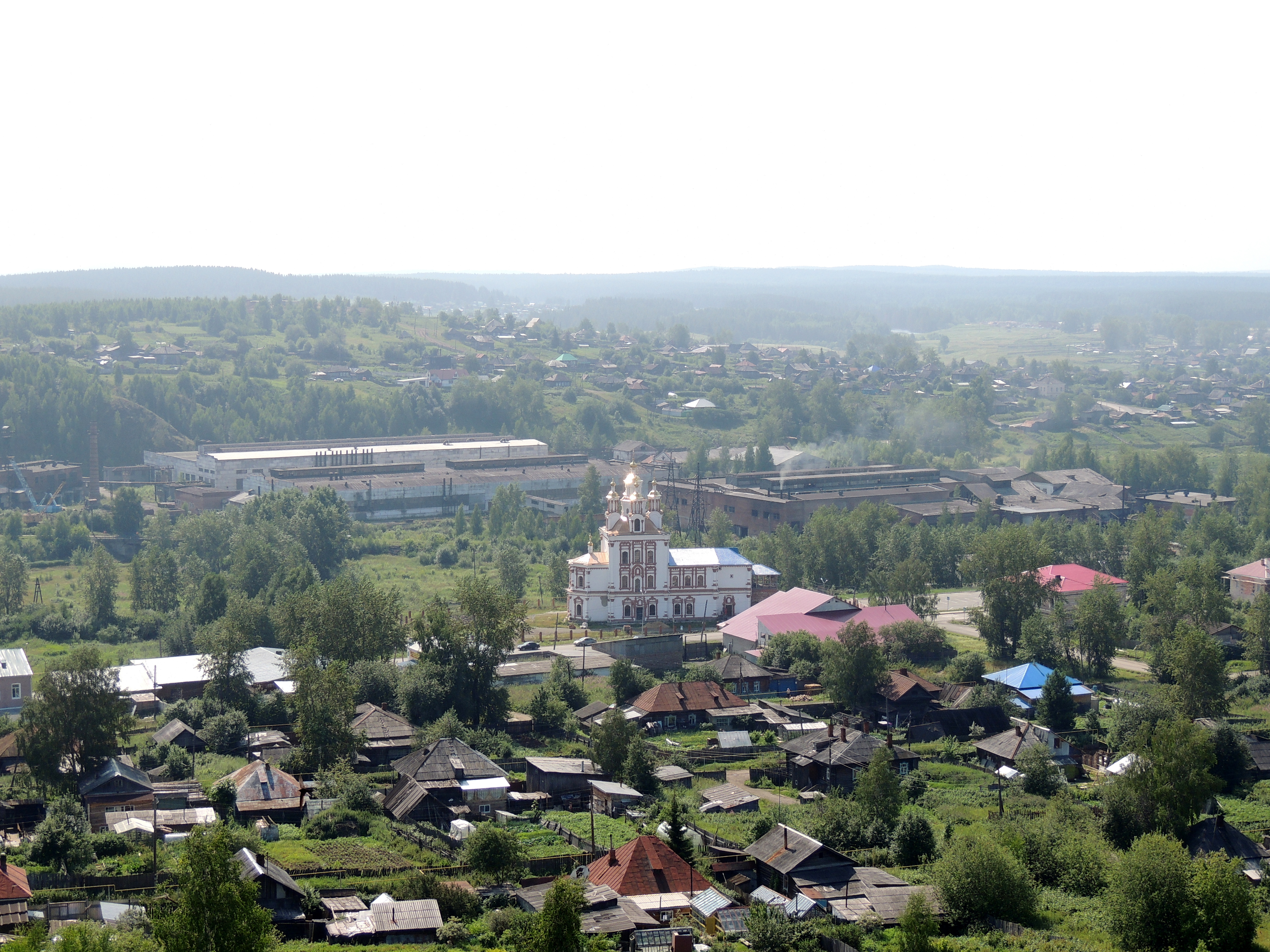
- View of Karpinsk

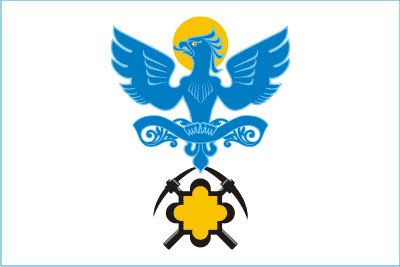
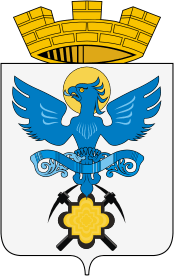
- Flag Coat of arms
- Interactive map of Karpinsk
- Location of Karpinsk Karpinsk (Sverdlovsk Oblast)
- Coordinates: 59°46′N 59°59′E
- Country: Russia
- Federal subject: Sverdlovsk Oblast
- Founded: 1941
- Town status since: 1941
- Elevation: 210 m (690 ft)

Population (2010 Census)
  - Total: 29,113
  - Estimate (2025): 24,918 (−14.4%)

Administrative status
  - Subordinated to: Town of Karpinsk
  - Capital of: Town of Karpinsk

Municipal status
  - Urban okrug: Karpinsk Urban Okrug
  - Capital of: Karpinsk Urban Okrug
- Time zone: UTC+5 (MSK+2)
- Postal codes: 624930–624933, 624936
- OKTMO ID: 65742000001
- Website: karpinsk.midural.ru

Karpinsk (Russian: Карпи́нск) is a town in Sverdlovsk Oblast, Russia, located on the Turya River (Ob's basin), 436 kilometers (271 mi) north of Yekaterinburg, the administrative center of the oblast. Population: 29,113 (2010 census); 31,216 (2002 census); 36,968 (1989 Soviet census). The town is named for mineralogist and geologist Alexander Karpinsky.

== History ==
The settlement of Bogoslovsk (Богосло́вск) was founded in either 1759 or in 1769. It remained one of the largest copper production centers in the Urals until 1917. Coal deposits started to be mined in 1911. In 1941, the settlement of Bogoslovsky (Богосло́вский) merged with the nearby settlement of Ugolny (У́гольный) to form the town of Karpinsk.

From 1945 to 1949, there existed close to Karpinsk a labor camp for Russo-Germans and German civilians, who for the most part were forcibly displaced from East Prussia and Pomerania to be used as forced labor. They were women and men between fifteen and sixty-five years of age. Those capable of work were forced to engage in strip-mining of lignite, used in housing construction and road construction, labored in a stone quarry, and at times served as skilled laborers in various workshops. Seasonally, work brigades were sent into the taiga as forest laborers. Moreover, prisoner-of-war camp #504 for German POWs from World War II was located in Karpinsk.

== Administrative and municipal status ==
Within the framework of the administrative divisions, it is, together with the town of Volchansk and ten rural localities, incorporated as the Town of Karpinsk—an administrative unit with the status equal to that of the districts. As a municipal division, Karpinsk and eight rural localities are incorporated as Karpinsk Urban Okrug. The town of Volchansk, together with the remaining two rural localities, is incorporated separately as Volchansky Urban Okrug.

== Sports ==
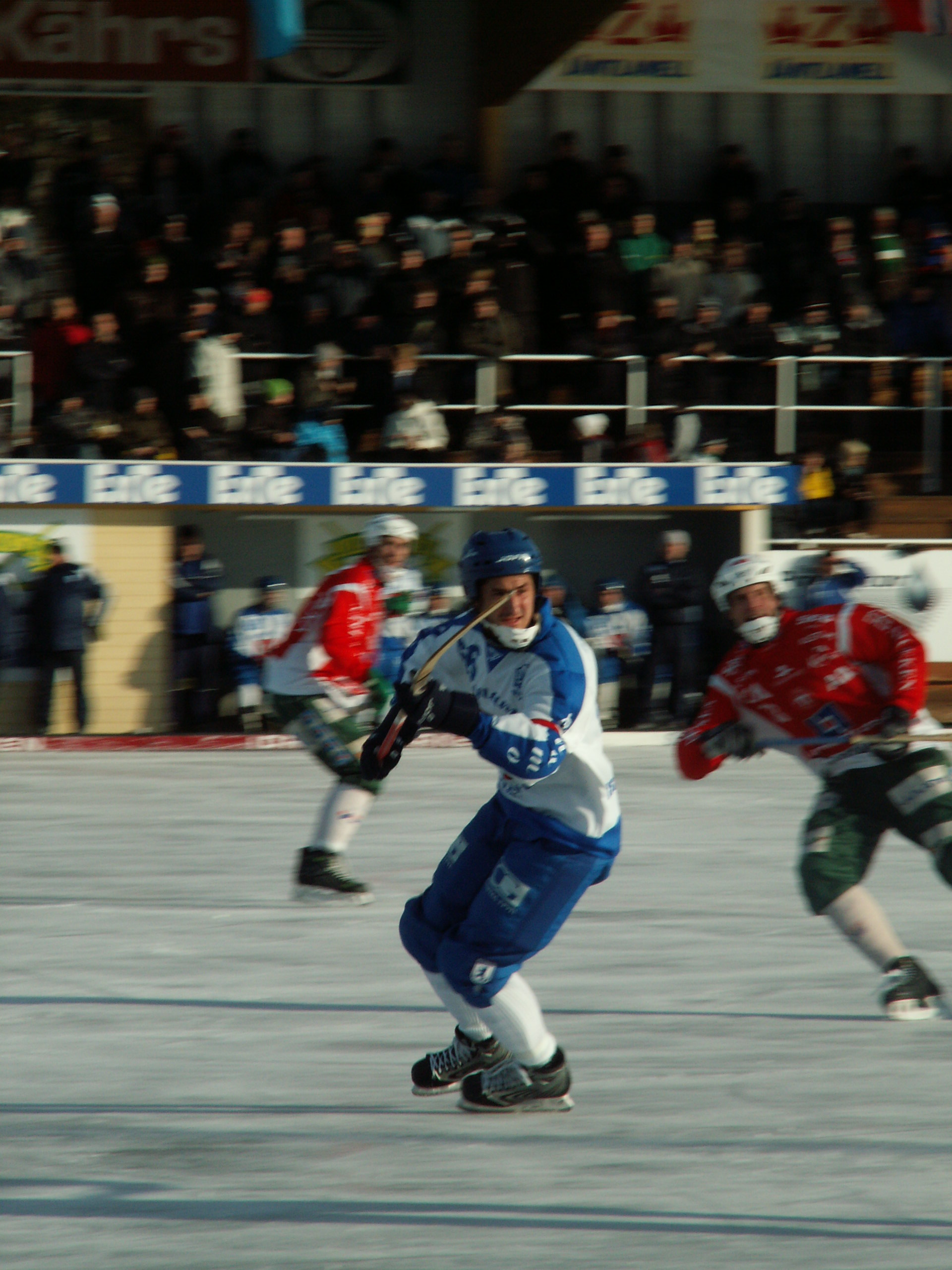
Mikhail Sveshnikov playing for Dynamo Moscow

Bandy player Mikhail Sveshnikov comes from the town. After the 2011-2012 season, he was acknowledged as the second best player of the national championship. He has become a citizen of honour in Karpinsk.

The local bandy club is Sputnik, where Oleg Sveshnikov, the father of Mikhail, is a coach.

== See also ==
- Volchansk tram system (defunct interurban line to Karpinsk)
