= Verkhotursky District =

District in Sverdlovsk Oblast, Russia

Verkhotursky District Верхотурский район (Russian)
- District
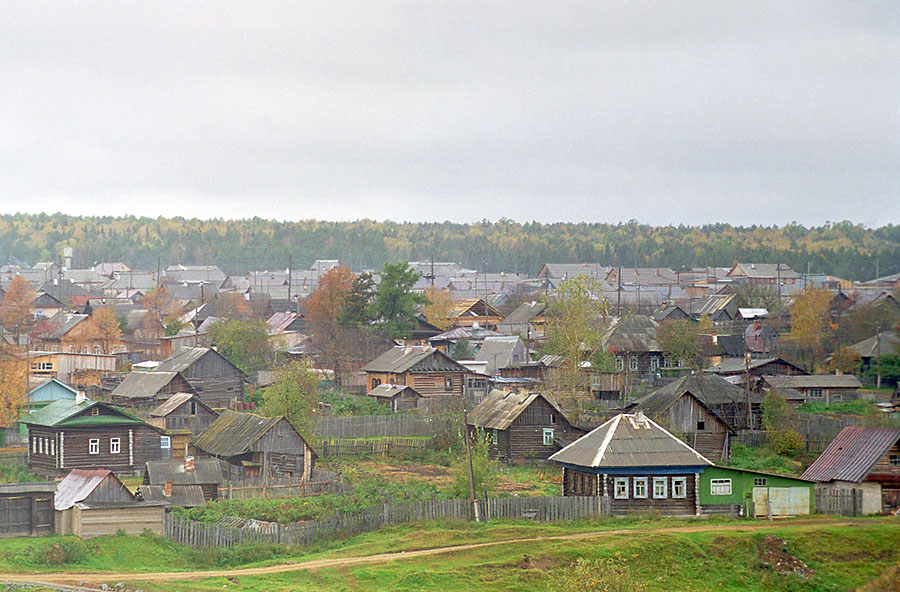
- Verkhoturye

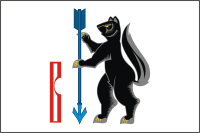
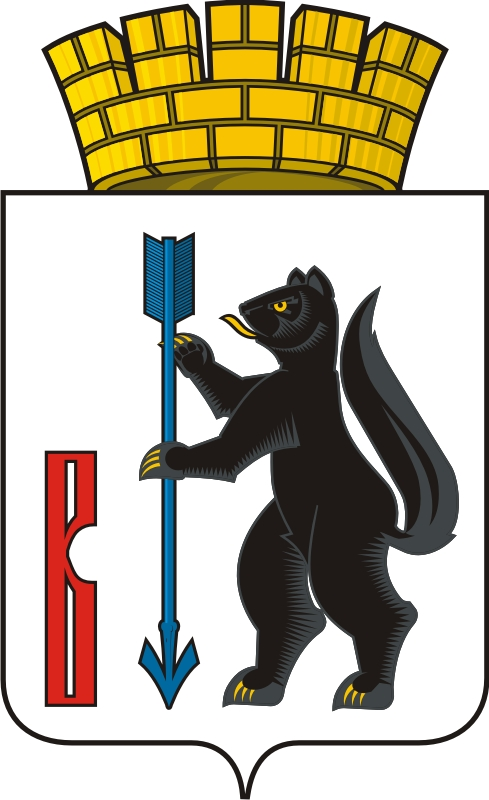
- Flag Coat of arms
- Location of Verkhotursky District in Sverdlovsk Oblast
- Coordinates: 58.711°N 61.114°E
- Country: Russia
- Federal subject: Sverdlovsk Oblast
- Established: 3 November 1923
- Administrative center: Verkhoturye

Area
  - Total: 4,925 km^{2} (1,902 sq mi)

Population (2010 Census)
  - Total: 16,802
  - Density: 3.412/km^{2} (8.836/sq mi)
  - Urban: 52.5%
  - Rural: 47.5%

Administrative structure
  - Administrative divisions: 1 Towns, 10 Selsoviets
  - Inhabited localities: 1 cities/towns, 50 rural localities

Municipal structure
  - Municipally incorporated as: Verkhotursky Urban Okrug
- Time zone: UTC+5 (MSK+2)
- OKTMO ID: 65709000
- Website: http://adm-verhotury.ru/

Verkhotursky District (Russian: Верхоту́рский райо́н) is an administrative district (raion), one of the thirty in Sverdlovsk Oblast, Russia. As a municipal division, it is incorporated as Verkhotursky Urban Okrug. Its administrative center is the town of Verkhoturye. Population: 16,802 (2010 Census); 19,153 (2002 census); 21,277 (1989 Soviet census). The population of Verkhoturye accounts for 52.5% of the district's total population.
