= Alapayevsky District =

District in Sverdlovsk Oblast, Russia

Alapayevsky District Алапаевский район (Russian)
- District
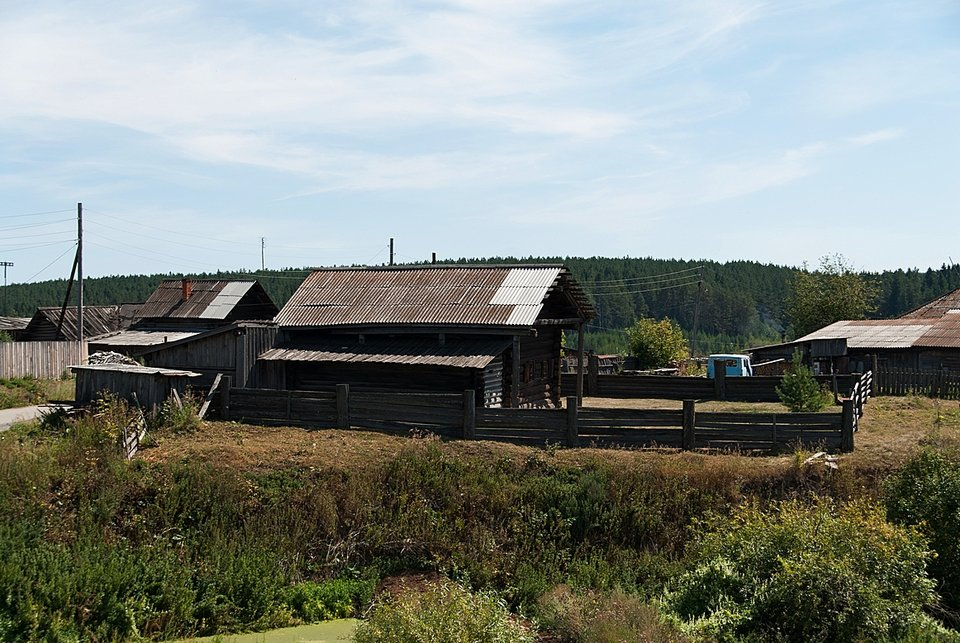
- A historical izba in the selo of Koptelovo in Alapayevsky District

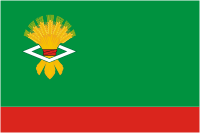
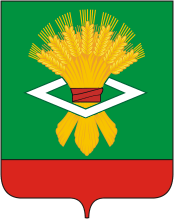
- Flag Coat of arms
- Location of Alapayevsky District in Sverdlovsk Oblast
- Coordinates: 58.288°N 62.209°E
- Country: Russia
- Federal subject: Sverdlovsk Oblast
- Established: 1923
- Administrative center: Alapayevsk

Area
  - Total: 10,036.2 km^{2} (3,875.0 sq mi)

Population (2010 Census)
  - Total: 33,613
  - Density: 3.3492/km^{2} (8.6743/sq mi)
  - Urban: 39.9%
  - Rural: 60.1%

Administrative structure
  - Inhabited localities: 2 urban-type settlements, 111 rural localities

Municipal structure
  - Municipally incorporated as: Alapayevskoye Urban Okrug
- Website: http://www.alapaevskoe.ru/

Alapayevsky District (Russian: Алапа́евский райо́н) is an administrative district (raion), one of the thirty in Sverdlovsk Oblast, Russia. As a municipal division, it is incorporated as Alapayevskoye Urban Okrug. It is located in the center of the oblast. Its administrative center is the town of Alapayevsk (which is not administratively a part of the district). Population: 33,613 (2010 Census); 40,522 (2002 census); 49,491 (1989 Soviet census).

== Administrative and municipal status ==
Within the framework of administrative divisions, Alapayevsky District is one of the thirty in the oblast. The town of Alapayevsk serves as its administrative center, despite being incorporated separately as an administrative unit with the status equal to that of the districts.

As a municipal division, the district is incorporated as Alapayevskoye Urban Okrug. The Town of Alapayevsk is incorporated separately from the district as Alapayevsk Urban Okrug.
