= Serovsky District =

District in Sverdlovsk Oblast, Russia

Serovsky District Серовский район (Russian)
- District
- Location of Serovsky District in Sverdlovsk Oblast
- Coordinates: 59°36′0.0″N 60°34′0.1″E
- Country: Russia
- Federal subject: Sverdlovsk Oblast
- Established: 12 November 1923
- Administrative center: Serov

Population (2010 Census)
  - Total: 23,538
  - Urban: 40.9%
  - Rural: 59.1%

Administrative structure
  - Inhabited localities: 1 urban-type settlements, 23 rural localities

Municipal structure
  - Municipally incorporated as: Sosvinsky Urban Okrug
- Website: http://sosvaokrug.ru/

Serovsky District (Russian: Серовский райо́н) is an administrative district (raion), one of the thirty in Sverdlovsk Oblast, Russia. As a municipal division, it is incorporated as Sosvinsky Urban Okrug (Со́сьвинский городско́й о́круг). Its administrative center is the town of Serov (which is not administratively a part of the district). Population: 23,538 (2010 Census); 26,182 (2002 Census); 32,262 (1989 Soviet census).

== Administrative and municipal status ==
Within the framework of administrative divisions, Serovsky District is one of the thirty in the oblast. The town of Serov serves as its administrative center, despite being incorporated separately as an administrative unit with the status equal to that of the districts.

As a municipal division, the district is incorporated as Sosvinsky Urban Okrug. The Town of Serov is incorporated separately from the district as Serovsky Urban Okrug.
