= Pervouralsk constituency =

Pervouralsk single-member constituency
- Constituency of the Russian State Duma
- Deputy: Zelimkhan Mutsoyev; United Russia
- Federal subject: Sverdlovsk Oblast
- Districts: Achitsky, Artinsky, Bisert, Degtyarsk, Krasnoufimsk, Krasnoufimsky, Nizhneserginsky, ZATO Novouralsk, Pervouralsk, Polevskoy, Revda, Shalinsky, Staroutkinsk, Verkh-Neyvinsky, Verkhny Tagil
- Voters: 440,313 (2026)

The Pervouralsk constituency (No.174 (Note: No.165 in 1993-1995, No.166 in 1995-2007, No.173 in 2016–2026)) is a Russian legislative constituency in Sverdlovsk Oblast. The constituency covers south-western Sverdlovsk Oblast, including industrial city Pervouralsk, towns Krasnoufimsk, Polevskoy and Revda, closed city Novouralsk and Yekaterinburg satellite city Degtyarsk.

The constituency has been represented since 1999 by United Russia deputy Zelimkhan Mutsoyev, billionaire businessman and owner of Pervouralsk New Pipe Plant.

== Boundaries ==
1993–2007: Achitsky District, Artinsky District, Bisert, Degtyarsk, Krasnoufimsk, Krasnoufimsky District, Nizhneserginsky District, Pervouralsk, Polevskoy, Revda, Shalinsky District, Sredneuralsk, Staroutkinsk, Verkhnyaya Pyshma
The constituency covered south-western Sverdlovsk Oblast, including industrial city Pervouralsk, towns Krasnoufimsk, Polevskoy and Revda, closed city Novouralsk and Yekaterinburg satellite cities Degtyarsk, Sredneuralsk and Verkhnyaya Pyshma.

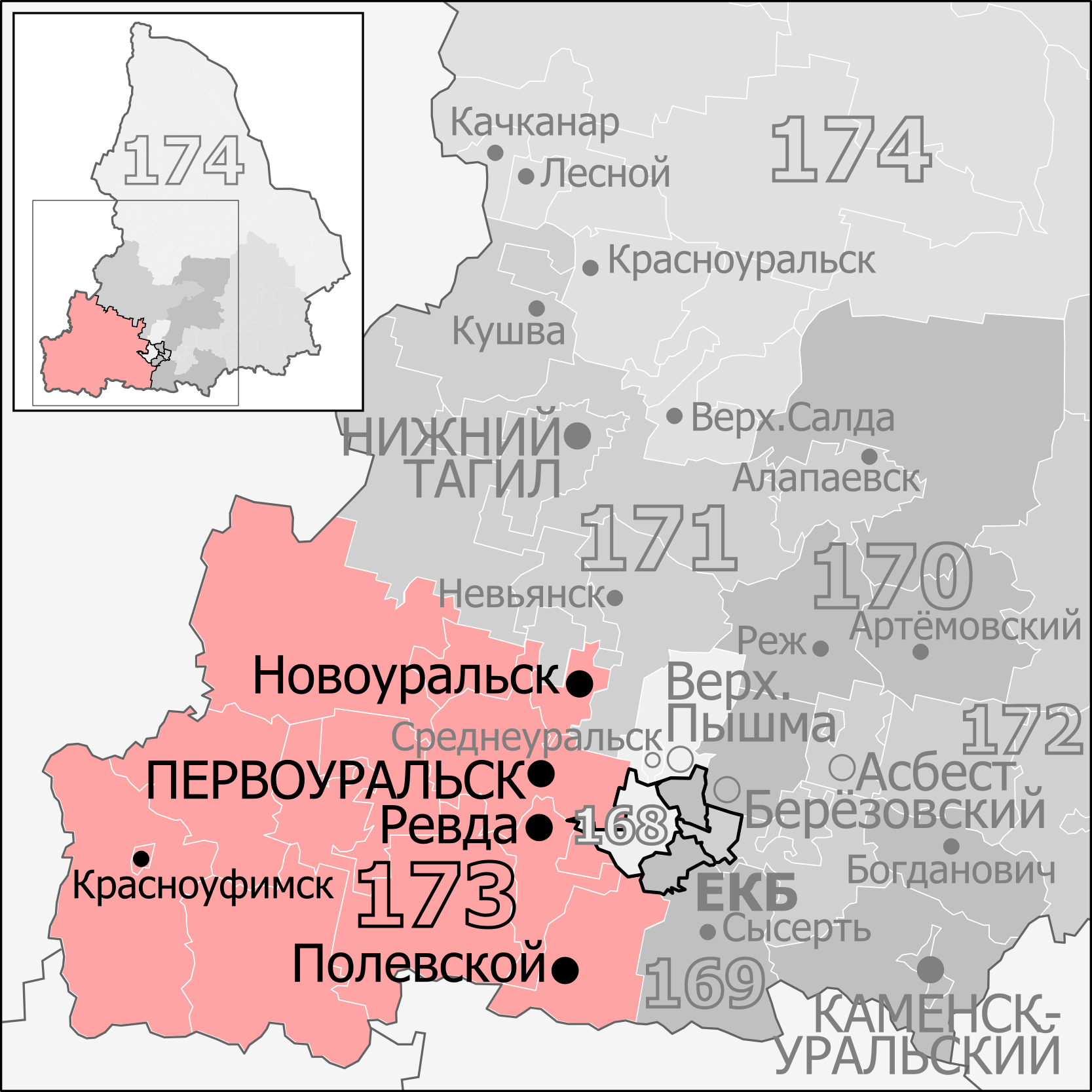
Constituency boundaries from 2016 to 2026

2016–2026: Achitsky District, Artinsky District, Bisert, Degtyarsk, Krasnoufimsk, Krasnoufimsky District, Nizhneserginsky District, Novouralsk, Pervouralsk, Polevskoy, Revda, Shalinsky District, Staroutkinsk
The constituency was re-created for the 2016 election and retained almost all of its former territory, losing only Sredneuralsk and Verkhnyaya Pyshma to Sverdlovsk constituency. This seat also gained nuclear fuel producing closed city Novouralsk from Nizhny Tagil constituency.

2026–present: Achitsky District, Artinsky District, Bisert, Degtyarsk, Krasnoufimsk, Krasnoufimsky District, Nizhneserginsky District, Novouralsk, Pervouralsk, Polevskoy, Revda, Shalinsky District, Staroutkinsk, Verkh-Neyvinsky, Verkhny Tagil
After the 2025 redistricting the constituency was slightly changed, gaining Verkh-Neyvinsky and Verkhny Tagil to its north from Nizhny Tagil constituency.

== Members elected ==
Election	Member	Party
1993	Leonid Nekrasov	Independent
1995	Gennady Burbulis	Independent
1999	Zelimkhan Mutsoyev	Independent
2003	Zelimkhan Mutsoyev	People's Party
2007	Proportional representation - no election by constituency	
2011	Proportional representation - no election by constituency	
2016	Zelimkhan Mutsoyev	United Russia
2021	Zelimkhan Mutsoyev	United Russia
2026	Zelimkhan Mutsoyev	United Russia

== Election results ==
=== 1993 ===
Summary of the 12 December 1993 Russian legislative election in the Pervouralsk constituency
Candidate	Party	Votes	%
Leonid Nekrasov	Independent	62,941	26.33%
Mikhail Ananyin	Independent	–	18.74%
Valery Alekseyev	Choice of Russia	–	–
Musavir Khusayenov	Democratic Party	–	–
Vladimir Shtinov	Kedr	–	–
Total		239,082	100%

=== 1995 ===
Summary of the 17 December 1995 Russian legislative election in the Pervouralsk constituency
Candidate	Party	Votes	%
Gennady Burbulis	Independent	49,830	19.41%
Boris Yachmenev	Communists and Working Russia - for the Soviet Union	42,245	16.45%
Leonid Nekrasov (incumbent)	Party of Economic Freedom	33,840	13.18%
Vera Sokolkina	Independent	26,802	10.44%
Valery Melekhin	Independent	25,135	9.79%
Yelena Zvereva	Ivan Rybkin Bloc	17,739	6.91%
Sergey Kamelin	Liberal Democratic Party	14,500	5.65%
Vladimir Prisyazhny	Independent	8,159	3.18%
against all		32,925	12.82%
Total		256,765	100%

=== 1999 ===
Summary of the 19 December 1999 Russian legislative election in the Pervouralsk constituency
Candidate	Party	Votes	%
Zelimkhan Mutsoyev	Independent	52,281	21.58%
Vladimir Primakov	Independent	49,318	20.35%
Odis Gaisin	Independent	25,867	10.68%
Boris Yachmenev	Communists and Workers of Russia - for the Soviet Union	25,473	10.51%
Sergey Zapolsky	Party of Pensioners	20,527	8.47%
Valery Melekhin	Independent	6,985	2.88%
Sergey Yakimov	Congress of Russian Communities-Yury Boldyrev Movement	6,758	2.79%
Aleksandr Ivanchin-Pisarev	Independent	5,597	2.31%
Nikolay Arzhannikov	Independent	3,968	1.64%
Sergey Semenyuk	Independent	3,865	1.60%
against all		35,973	14.85%
Total		242,296	100%

=== 2003 ===
Summary of the 7 December 2003 Russian legislative election in the Perouralsk constituency
Candidate	Party	Votes	%
Zelimkhan Mutsoyev (incumbent)	People's Party	119,877	55.83%
Dmitry Ostanin	Agrarian Party	16,419	7.65%
Pyotr Zheleznyak	Communist Party	15,207	7.08%
Aleksandr Novikov	Liberal Democratic Party	9,495	4.42%
Vladimir Dmitriyev	Independent	6,478	3.02%
Dmitry Chekashev	Independent	5,701	2.66%
Andrey Dorozhkin	Independent	2,097	0.98%
against all		35,852	16.70%
Total		214,742	100%

=== 2016 ===
Summary of the 18 September 2016 Russian legislative election in the Pervouralsk constituency
Candidate	Party	Votes	%
Zelimkhan Mutsoyev	United Russia	94,290	47.00%
Vladislav Punin	A Just Russia	28,685	14.30%
Nikolay Yezersky	Communist Party	25,465	12.69%
Anton Bezdenezhnykh	Liberal Democratic Party	22,212	11.07%
Aleksey Poletayev	Communists of Russia	6,079	3.03%
Aleksandr Cherkasov	The Greens	3,810	1.90%
Igor Konakov	People's Freedom Party	3,573	1.78%
Sergey Yarutin	Patriots of Russia	3,189	1.59%
Sergey Renzhin	Party of Growth	2,817	1.40%
Total		200,597	100%

=== 2021 ===
Summary of the 17-19 September 2021 Russian legislative election in the Pervouralsk constituency
Candidate	Party	Votes	%
Zelimkhan Mutsoyev (incumbent)	United Russia	84,944	37.77%
Taras Isakov	Communist Party	55,229	24.56%
Nikolay Samutin	A Just Russia — For Truth	26,712	11.88%
Aleksandr Panasenko	Liberal Democratic Party	21,294	9.47%
Nikolay Aleksandrov	Rodina	16,200	7.20%
Aleksandr Kudelkin	Yabloko	6,708	2.98%
Total		224,869	100%

=== 2026 ===
Summary of the 18-20 September 2026 Russian legislative election in the Pervouralsk constituency
Candidate	Party	Votes	%
Zelimkhan Mutsoyev (incumbent)	United Russia	78,412	36.90%
Andrey Bazhenov	Communist Party	45,482	21.41%
Irina Vinogradova	New People	19,521	9.19%
Zhanna Zhuravleva	A Just Russia	19,520	9.19%
Aleksandr Panasenko	Liberal Democratic Party	18,278	8.60%
Olga Lopareva	Yabloko	11,115	5.23%
Maria Bobina	The Greens	7,390	3.48%
Pyotr Yanochkin	Rodina	4,111	1.93%
Total		212,483	100%
