= Sergei Safronov (fighter pilot) =

Soviet aviator

- Born: 25 March 1930; Gus-Khrustalny, Ivanovo Industrial Oblast, RSFSR, Soviet Union
- Died: 1 May 1960 (aged 30); Degtyarsk, Sverdlovsk Oblast, RSFSR, Soviet Union
- Military career
- Allegiance: Soviet Union
- Branch: Soviet Air Defense Forces
- Service years: 1952–1960
- Rank: Senior lieutenant
- Unit: 764th Fighter Aviation Regiment
- Awards: Order of the Red Banner

Sergei Ivanovich Safronov (Russian: Серге́й Ива́нович Сафро́нов; 25 March 1930 – 1 May 1960) was a senior lieutenant and fighter pilot in the Soviet Air Defence Forces. Safronov was shot down by a friendly surface-to-air missile after attempting to intercept Gary Powers' reconnaissance Lockheed U-2 near Sverdlovsk.

== Biography ==
Safronov was born on 25 March 1930 in Gus-Khrustalny and graduated from the town's School No. 1 (later School No. 12) in 1948. He joined the Soviet Air Forces and graduated from the Borisoglebsk Military Aviation School of Pilots, serving with the 764th Fighter Aviation Regiment of the Soviet Air Defence Forces at Bolshoye Savino Airport near Perm from 1952.

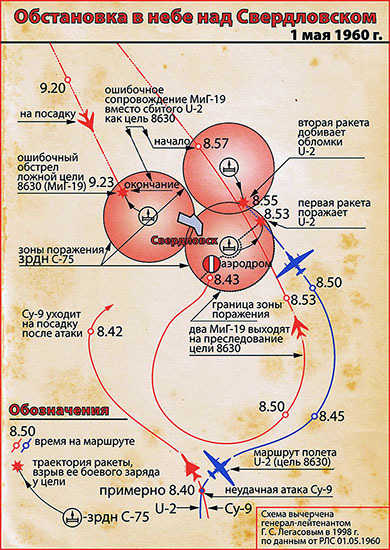
Scheme of the aerial events (in Russian)

In the 1960 U-2 incident Safronov and his flight leader, deputy squadron commander Captain Boris Ayvazyan were vectored to intercept Gary Powers' Lockheed U-2 (after refueling at Sverdlovsk's Koltsovo Airport) with their MiG-19 fighters after an earlier attempt by a Sukhoi Su-9 failed. On their way to interception, the U-2 was shot down by a S-75 Dvina surface-to-air missile at 8:53 Moscow time. However this was not realised throughout the Soviet chain of command, so three S-75 missiles were fired half hour later by another unit at the MiGs returning to land; the MiGs' IFF transponders were not yet switched to the new May codes because of the 1 May holiday and consequently, Safronov's plane was acquired as a foe by the missile operators. (The matter is confused in some sources with a salvo fired at the U-2 by another battery just two minutes after the first missile destroyed it, since the large fragments were interpreted on radars like chaff that the plane dropped, continuing to escape. According to Sergei Khrushchev's account, the Soviet military also did much to confuse the order of events in the internal reporting and investigation, so as to cover their errors.)

While Ayvazyan managed to escape by descending fast, Safronov's aircraft took a direct hit from one of the three S-75 missiles at 9:23. There were claims that "he was able to eject, but died from his injuries", the source actually says "but was dead when he hit the ground", the Russian sources say he was found dead outside the plane, strapped in his seat with the parachute unopened. The airplane crashed near Degtyarsk, 35 km southwest of Sverdlovsk. Martin Knutson said in 1990s that Powers recalled seeing another parachute after leaving the U-2, however this does not fit the chronology.

After the affair was fully broken by Khrushchev in a Supreme Soviet speech on Saturday 7 May, its Presidium issued a public decree (No 237/12) presenting Safronov the Order of the Red Banner along with Major Mikhail Voronov and Captain Nikolai Shelud'ko, commanders of the two missile batteries which had engaged the U-2. (They were followed by 18 lesser decorations for other participants.) There was no mention that Safronov's order was in memoriam and several subsequent publications did not state that he died. His death was not revealed until May 1990 during Glasnost.

== Personal life ==
Safronov married Anna Vasilievna Panfilova his high school classmate, and had a son, Alexander Sergeievich who went on to study at a civilian aviation academy. Safronov was buried at the Yegoshikha Cemetery in Perm. Years after Safronov's death, his wife married Ayvazyan. She was still alive in 2010, attending Safronov's memorials.

== Legacy ==
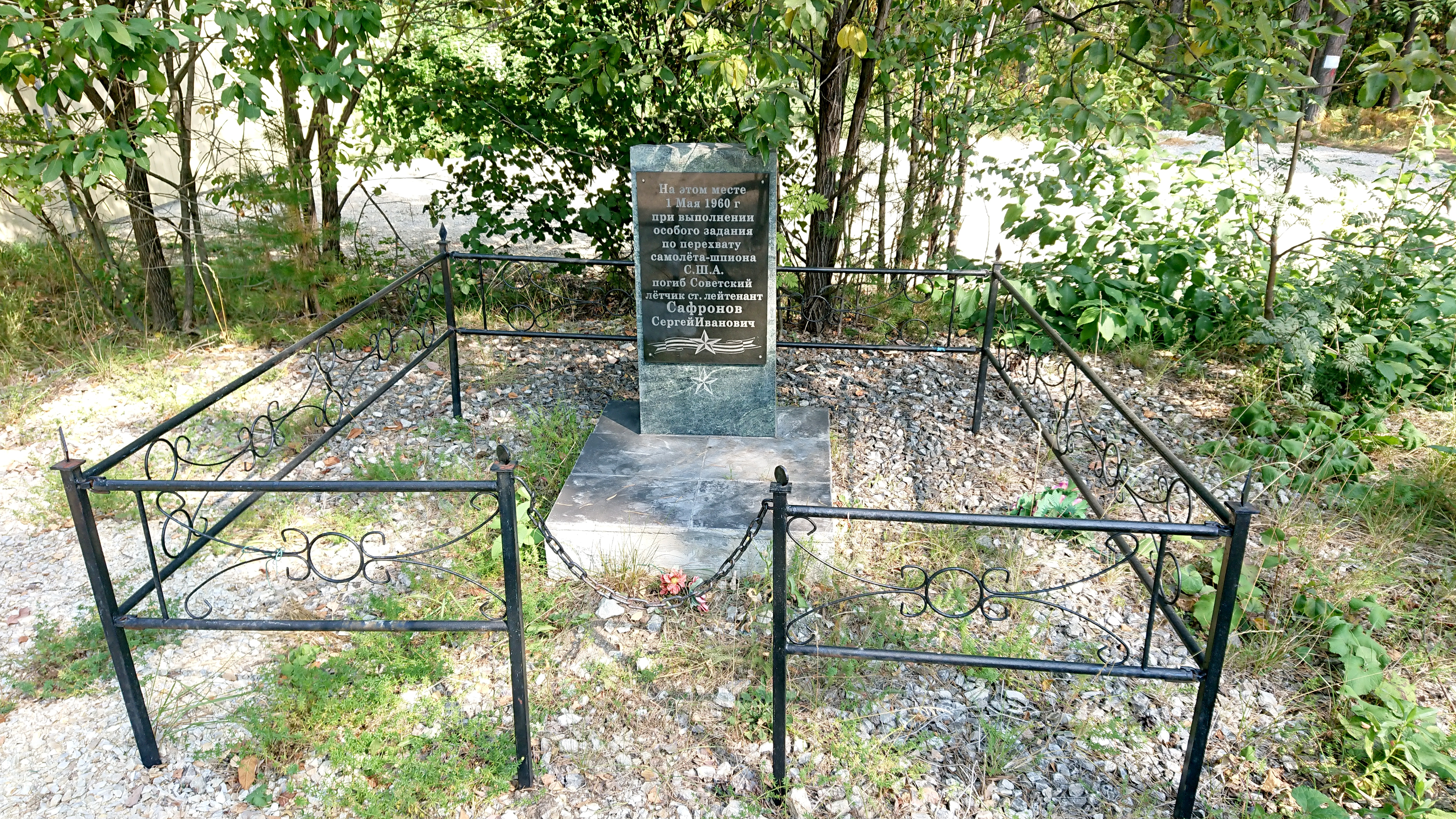
Safronov's memorial in Degtyarsk

Safronov was posthumously made an honorary citizen of the town of Degtyarsk, over which he was shot down. A monument to Safronov was built in the town's park. On 1 May 2007, the 47th anniversary of Safronov's death, a memorial stele was dedicated at the 764th Fighter Aviation Regiment airport at Bolshoye Savino. Three years later, on the 50th anniversary of his death, a Mikoyan MiG-31 fighter/interceptor stationed at Bolshoye Savino was named for Safronov and a Sergei Safronov Memorial Day was repeatedly celebrated on 1 May.
