= 764th Fighter Aviation Regiment =

764th Fighter Aviation Regiment (2016–present) 2nd Aviation Group, 6980th Aviation Base (2010–2016) 6977th Aviation Base (2009–2010) 764th Fighter Aviation Regiment PVO (1952–2009)
- Active: 1952–present
- Country: Soviet Union; Russia
- Branch: Russian Air Force
- Type: Aviation Regiment
- Garrison/HQ: Bolshoye Savino Airport

Aircraft flown
- Mikoyan MiG-31

The 764th Fighter Aviation Regiment (Military Unit Number 88503) is a regiment of the Russian Aerospace Forces, based at Bolshoye Savino Airport near Perm.

== History ==
The 764th Regiment was activated on 15 June 1952 at Bolshoye Savino Airport at Perm, part of the 87th Fighter Aviation Division PVO. The regiment was equipped with the Mikoyan-Gurevich MiG-15 and received Mikoyan-Gurevich MiG-17 in 1956. Two pilots of the regiment, deputy squadron commander Captain Boris Ayvazyan and Senior Lieutenant Sergei Safronov, sortied to intercept the Lockheed U-2 spyplane of American pilot Francis Gary Powers on 1 May 1960; Safronov was shot down and killed by a Soviet surface-to-air missile after Powers' U-2 was downed. It was reequipped with the Mikoyan-Gurevich MiG-19P in 1961. In 1964, the regiment became part of the 20th Air Defense Corps. In 1967 and 1968, several crews were deployed to Amderma in the Nenets Autonomous Okrug. In 1971, the 764th received the MiG-25P. In 1984, the regiment was reequipped with the Mikoyan MiG-31. In November 1990, the regiment was equipped with 38 MiG-31s, according to Treaty on Conventional Armed Forces in Europe data. In May 1998, the regiment became part of the 5th Air and Air Defense Forces Army. In 2000, the regiment had 31 MiG-31s and 2 MiG-25s, according to CFE treaty data.

On 1 June 2009, during the reform of the Russian Air Force, the regiment was reorganized into the 6977th Aviation Base of the second category of the 2nd Air and Air Defense Forces Command. On 1 December 2010, it became the 2nd Aviation Group of the 6980th Aviation Base. The command became the 14th Air and Air Defense Forces Army in August 2015. In 2016, the regiment returned to its original name, though without the PVO designation, receiving its battle flag in December of that year. The 764th received six modernized MiG-31BSMs in early 2017, according to an official Russian military press release, augmenting its pre-existing MiG-31BS and MiG-31DZ aircraft as part of a modernization program to extend the airworthiness of its MiG-31s. As of 2018, the regiment included two squadrons of MiG-31s.

== Aircraft operated ==
Aircraft operated by 764th IAP, data from
From	To	Aircraft	Version
1953	1956	Mikoyan-Gurevich MiG-15	
1956	1961	Mikoyan-Gurevich MiG-17	
1961	1971	Mikoyan-Gurevich MiG-19	MiG-19P
1971	1984	Mikoyan-Gurevich MiG-25	MiG-25P
1984	present	Mikoyan MiG-31	MiG-31BM/BSM/DZ
