= Shalya (urban-type settlement) =

Work settlement in Sverdlovsk Oblast, Russia

Shalya Шаля
- Work settlement
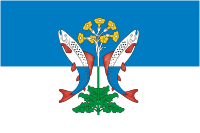
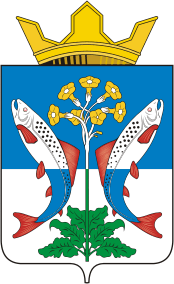
- Flag Coat of arms
- Interactive map of Shalya
- Location of Shalya Shalya (Sverdlovsk Oblast)
- Coordinates: 57°15′03″N 58°44′15″E
- Country: Russia
- Federal subject: Sverdlovsk Oblast
- Administrative district: Shalinsky District
- Founded: 1903
- Urban-type settlement status since: 1942

Population (2010 Census)
  - Total: 6,433
  - Estimate (2025): 5,970 (−7.2%)

Administrative status
  - Capital of: Shalinsky District

Municipal status
  - Urban okrug: Shalinsky Urban Okrug
  - Capital of: Shalinsky Urban Okrug
- Time zone: UTC+5 (MSK+2)
- Postal code: 623030
- OKTMO ID: 65727000051
- Website: www.shalya.ru

Shalya (Russian: Шаля) is an urban locality (a work settlement) and the administrative center of Shalinsky District of Sverdlovsk Oblast, Russia. Population: 6,433 (2010 census); 6,801 (2002 census); 7,123 (1989 Soviet census).

== History ==
Work settlement status was granted to it in 1942.

== Administrative and municipal status ==
Within the framework of administrative divisions, Shalya serves as the administrative center of Shalinsky District and is subordinated to it. As a municipal division, the work settlement of Shalya together with thirty-eight rural localities in Shalinsky District is incorporated as Shalinsky Urban Okrug.
