= 1960 U-2 incident =

Cold War aircraft shootdown

1960 U-2 shootdown incident
- Part of the Cold War
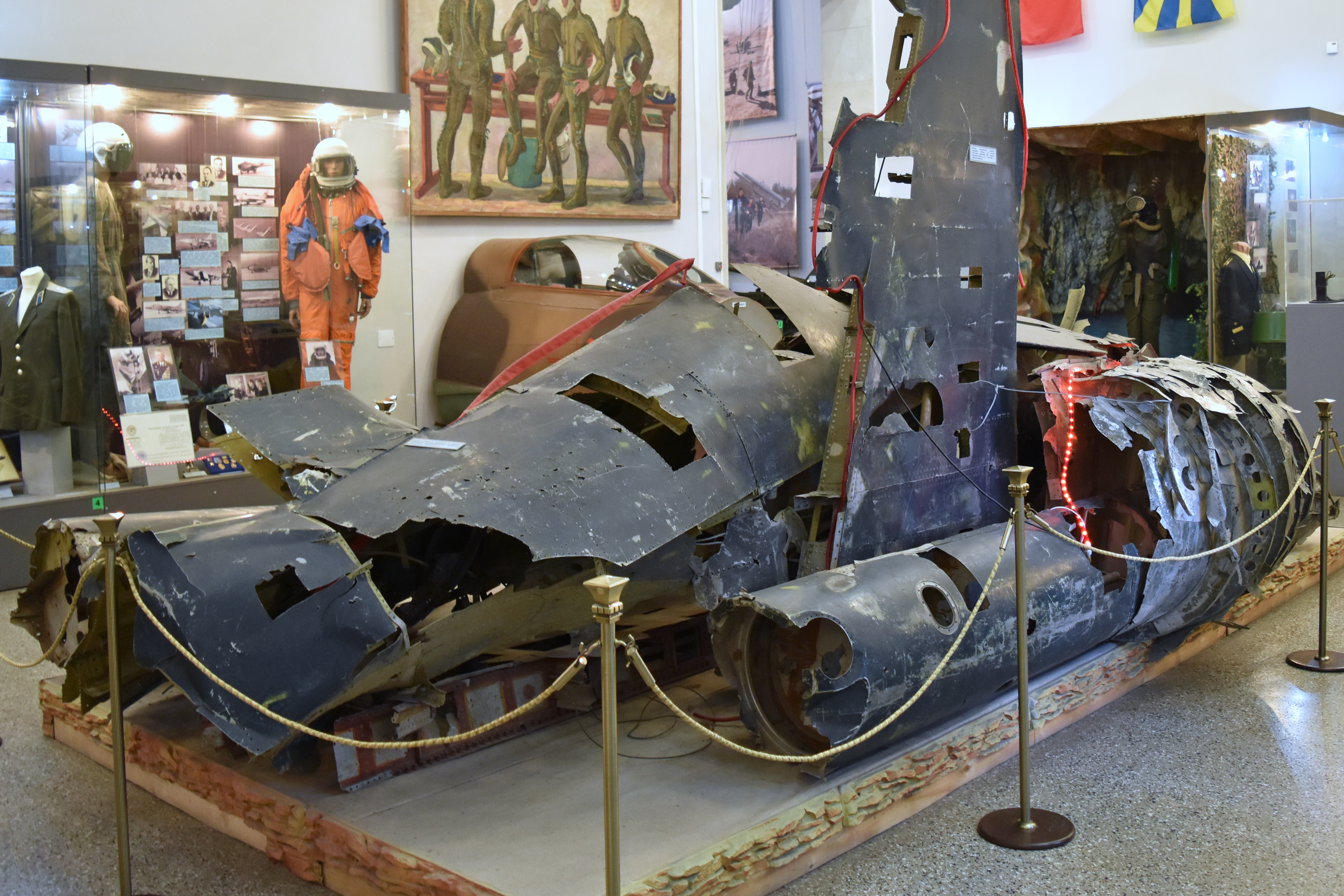
- The wreckage of the American Lockheed U-2 Dragon Lady on display at the Central Armed Forces Museum in Moscow
- Type: Aircraft shootdown
- Location: Near Aramil, Sverdlovsk Oblast, Soviet Union; 56°43′35″N 60°59′10″E
- Objective: Intercept American U-2 reconnaissance aircraft
- Date: 1 May 1960
- Executed by: Soviet Air Defense Forces
- Outcome: American aircraft shot down, pilot Francis Gary Powers captured
- Casualties: 1; Soviet pilot Sergei Safronov (friendly fire); 0 killed

Universal Newsreel about the 1960 U-2 incident

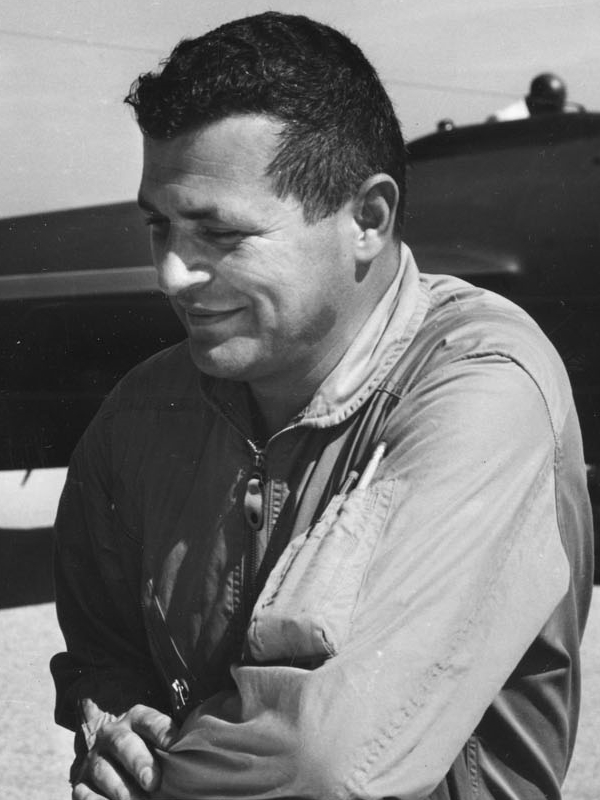
Francis Gary Powers, pilot of the plane

On 1 May 1960, a United States U-2 spy plane, having taken off from Peshawar in Pakistan, was shot down by the Soviet Air Defence Forces in Sverdlovsk, Russia. It was conducting photographic aerial reconnaissance inside Soviet territory while being flown by American Central Intelligence Agency pilot Francis Gary Powers, as it was hit by a surface-to-air missile. Powers parachuted to the ground and was captured.

Initially, American authorities claimed the incident involved the loss of a civilian weather research aircraft operated by NASA, but were forced to admit the mission's true purpose a few days later after the Soviet government produced the captured pilot and parts of the U-2's surveillance equipment, including photographs of Soviet military bases.

The incident occurred during the tenures of American president Dwight D. Eisenhower and Soviet leader Nikita Khrushchev, around two weeks before the scheduled opening of an east–west summit in Paris, France. Khrushchev and Eisenhower had met face-to-face at Camp David in Maryland in September 1959, and the seeming thaw in US-Soviet relations had raised hopes globally for a peaceful resolution to the Cold War. The U-2 incident shattered the amiable "Spirit of Camp David" that had prevailed for eight months, prompting the cancellation of the summit in Paris and embarrassing the US on the international stage. The Pakistani government issued a formal apology to the Soviet Union for its role in the mission.

After his capture, Powers was convicted of espionage and sentenced to three years of imprisonment plus seven years of hard labour; he was released two years later, in February 1962, in a prisoner exchange for Soviet intelligence officer Rudolf Abel.

== Background ==
In July 1958, US President Dwight D. Eisenhower requested permission from the Pakistani prime minister Feroze Khan Noon for the US to establish a secret intelligence facility in Pakistan and for the U-2 spy plane to fly from Pakistan. The U-2 flew at altitudes that could not be reached by Soviet fighter jets of the era; it was believed to be beyond the reach of Soviet missiles as well. A facility established in Badaber (Peshawar Air Station), 16 kilometres (9.9 mi) from Peshawar, was a cover for a major communications intercept operation run by the United States National Security Agency (NSA). Badaber was an excellent location because of its proximity to Soviet central Asia. This enabled the monitoring of missile test sites, key infrastructure and communications. The U-2 "spy-in-the-sky" was allowed to use the Pakistan Air Force section of Peshawar Airport to gain vital photo intelligence in an era before satellite observation.

Eisenhower did not want to fly American U-2 pilots over the Soviet Union. He believed that if one of these pilots were to be shot down or captured, the flight could be seen as an act of aggression that might spark open conflict. Someone suggested using British pilots from the Royal Air Force fly these missions instead of US Central Intelligence Agency (CIA) pilots, which would allow Eisenhower to deny US involvement. The British government consented to the proposal under the codename Project Oldster.

After the success of the first two British pilots and because of desire to determine the number of Soviet intercontinental ballistic missiles more accurately, Eisenhower allowed the flying of two more missions before the Four Power Paris Summit, scheduled for 16 May. The final two missions before the summit were to be flown by American pilots.

On 9 April 1960, a U-2C spy plane of the special CIA unit "10-10", piloted by Bob Ericson, crossed the southern national boundary of the Soviet Union in the area of Pamir Mountains and flew over four Soviet top-secret military objects: the Semipalatinsk Test Site, the Dolon Air Base where Tu-95 strategic bombers were stationed, the surface-to-air missile (SAM) test site of the Soviet Air Defence Forces near Saryshagan, and the Tyuratam missile range (Baikonur Cosmodrome).

The aircraft was detected by the Soviet Air Defense Forces when it had flown more than 250 kilometres (155 mi) over the Soviet national boundary; it avoided attempts at interception by a MiG-19 and a Su-9. The U-2 left Soviet air space and landed at an Iranian airstrip at Zahedan, completing an extraordinarily dangerous but productive intelligence operation. The next flight of the U-2 spy plane from Peshawar airport was planned for late April.

== Event ==
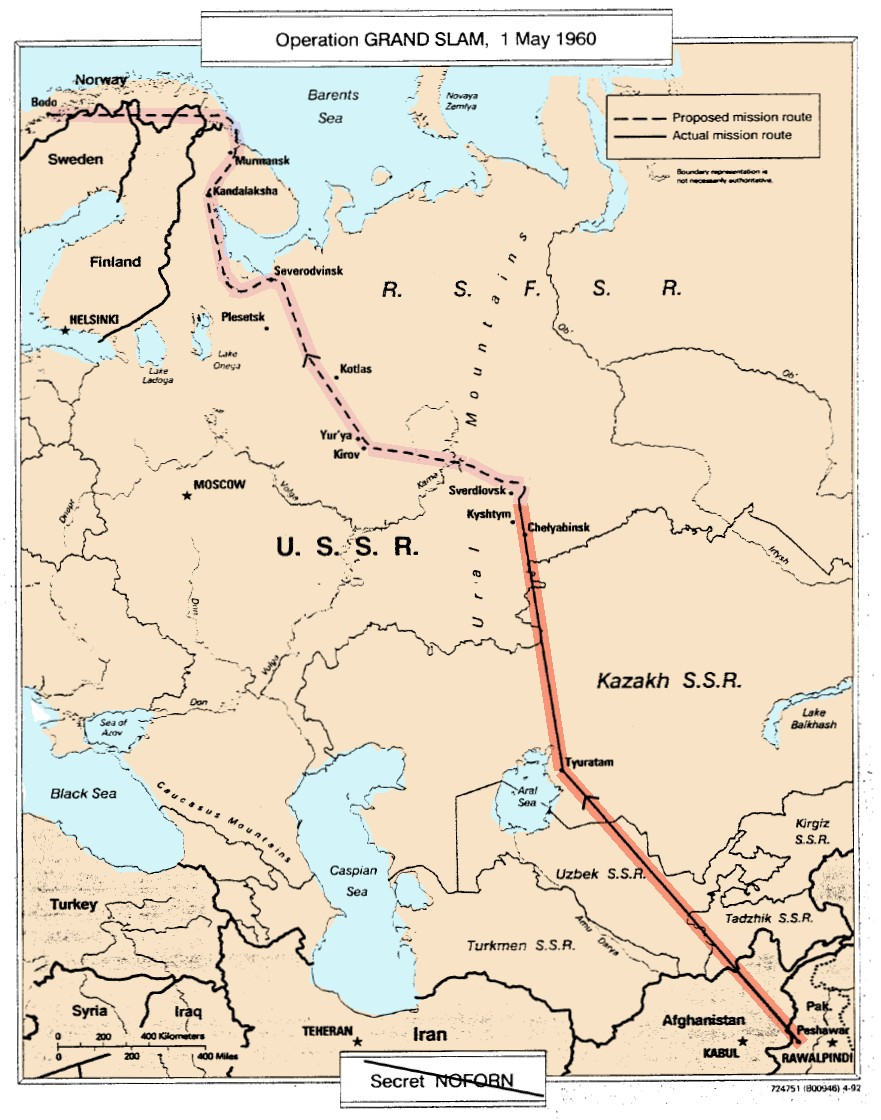
U-2 "GRAND SLAM" flight plan on 1 May 1960, from CIA publication The Central Intelligence Agency and Overhead Reconnaissance; The U-2 And Oxcart Programs, 1954–1974, declassified 25 June 2013

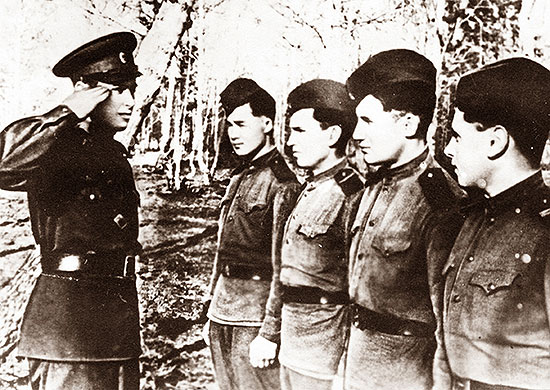
The combat crew, distinguished for the destruction of the U-2 on May 1, 1960

Dubbed "Grand Slam", the flight was to leave the base in Peshawar and overfly the Soviet Union. The photographic targets included the Soviet's ICBM launch pads: two at Baikonur Cosmodrome and four at Plesetsk Cosmodrome. Another target was Chelyabinsk-65 (today, Mayak), an important industrial center of plutonium processing. The flight would end with a landing at Bodø in Norway.

On 28 April 1960, a US Lockheed U-2C spy plane, Article 358, was ferried from Incirlik Air Base in Turkey to the US base at Peshawar airport by pilot Glen Dunaway. Fuel for the aircraft had been ferried to Peshawar the previous day in a US Air Force C-124 transport. An Air Force C-130 followed, carrying the ground crew, mission pilot Captain Francis Powers, and backup pilot Bob Ericson. On the morning of 29 April, the crew in Badaber was informed that the mission had been delayed by one day. As a result, Ericson flew Article 358 back to Incirlik and John Shinn ferried another U-2C, Article 360 56–6693, from Incirlik to Peshawar. On 30 April, the mission was delayed one day further because of bad weather over the Soviet Union.

The weather improved and on 1 May, 15 days before the scheduled opening of the east–west summit conference in Paris, Powers took off for Grand Slam in Article 360.

The U-2 flight was expected, and all units of the Soviet Air Defence Forces in the Central Asia, Kazakhstan, Siberia, Ural, and later in the USSR European Region and Extreme North, were placed on red alert. Soon after the aircraft was detected, Lieutenant General of the Air Force Yevgeniy Savitskiy ordered the air-unit commanders "to attack the violator by all alert flights located in the area of foreign plane's course, and to ram if necessary".

Because of the U-2's extreme altitude, Soviet attempts to intercept the aircraft using fighter aircraft failed. The U-2's course was out of range of several of the nearest SAM sites, and one SAM site failed to engage the aircraft since it was not on duty that day.

Powers' account of the flight shows that one of the last targets he overflew was the Chelyabinsk-65 plutonium production facility.

His U-2 was shot down near Kosulino, Ural Region, by the first of three S-75 Dvina surface-to-air missiles fired by a battery commanded by Mikhail Voronov. The S-75 site had been supposedly identified previously by the CIA, using photos taken during Vice President Richard Nixon's visit to Sverdlovsk the previous summer.

Powers bailed out but neglected to disconnect his oxygen hose and struggled with it until it broke, enabling him to separate from the aircraft. After parachuting safely onto Soviet soil, Powers was quickly captured. Powers carried a modified silver dollar which contained a lethal, shellfish-derived saxitoxin-tipped needle, but he did not use it.

The SAM command center was unaware for more than 30 minutes that the aircraft was destroyed. One of the Soviet MiG-19 fighters pursuing Powers was also destroyed in the missile salvo, and the pilot, Sergei Safronov, was killed. The MiGs' IFF transponders were not yet switched to the new May codes because of the 1 May holiday.

== American cover-up and exposure ==
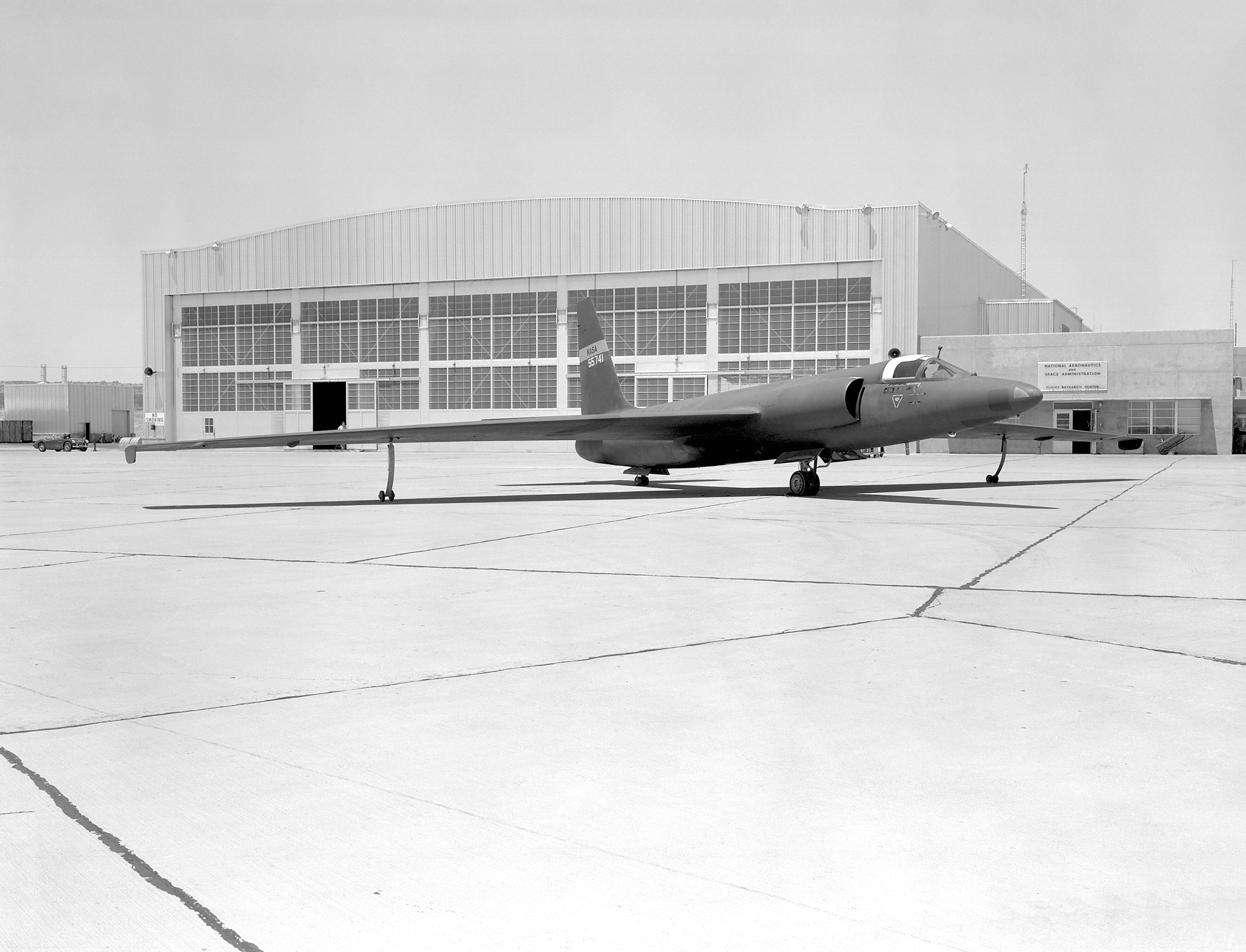
NASA photo of a U-2 with fictitious NASA markings and serial number at the NASA Flight Research Center, Edwards Air Force Base, on 6 May 1960 (NASA photo)

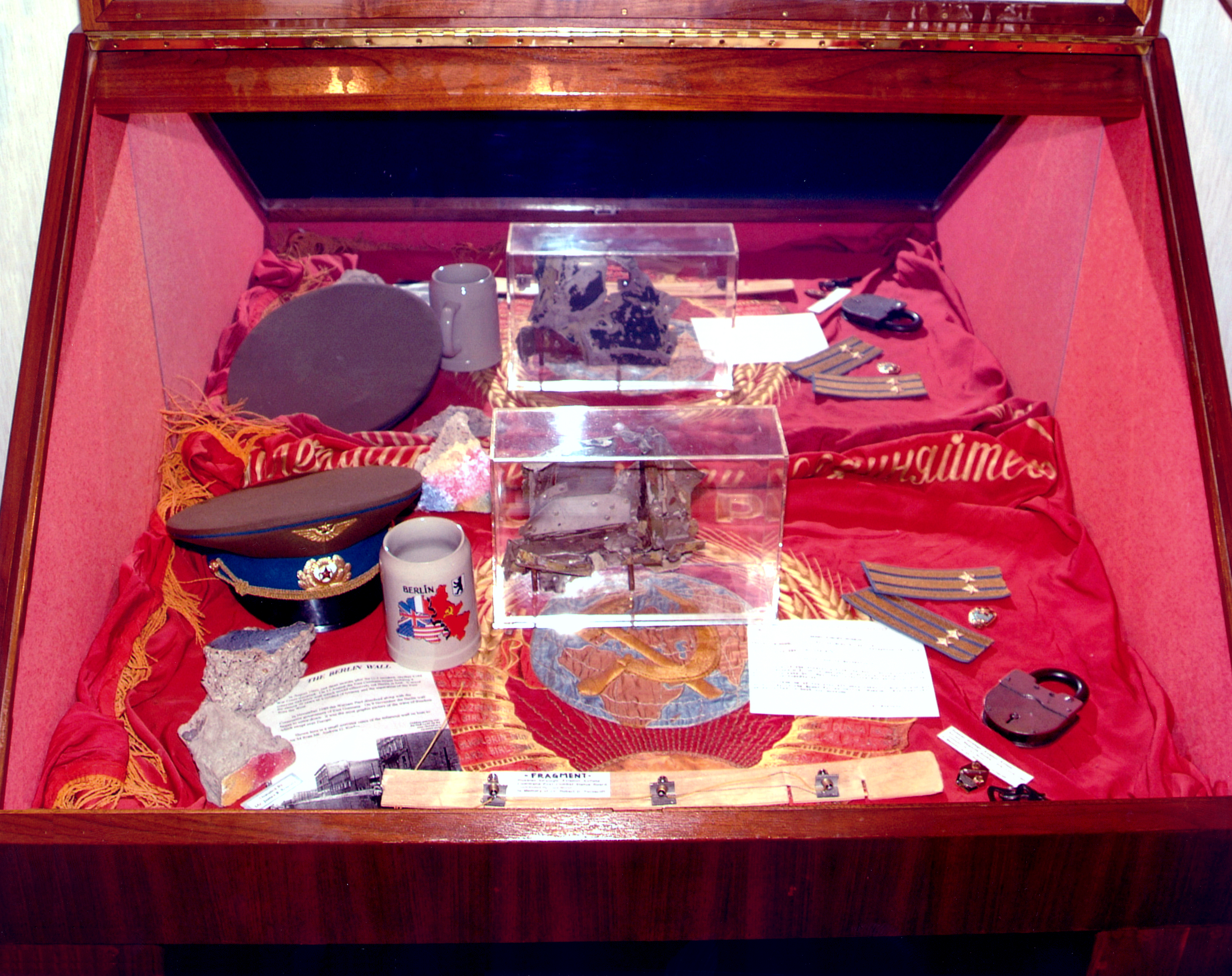
U-2 incident exhibit at the US's National Cryptologic Museum

US officials initially believed that Powers had died and his plane was destroyed. They decided to try a cover-up, which failed, enabling Nikita Khrushchev to embarrass President Eisenhower and his administration.

On 5 May, four days after Powers' disappearance, NASA issued a detailed press release noting that an aircraft had "gone missing" north of Turkey. The press release speculated that the pilot might have fallen unconscious while the autopilot was still engaged, even falsely claiming that "the pilot reported over the emergency frequency that he was experiencing oxygen difficulties". To bolster this, a U-2 was quickly painted in NASA colors and shown to the media.

That same day, the Senate made its first comments on the U-2 incident and began a domestic political controversy for Eisenhower. Mike Mansfield, the Senate Majority Whip, stated, "First reports indicate that the President had no knowledge of the plane incident. If that is the case, we have got to ask whether or not this administration has any real control over the federal bureaucracy." Mansfield, more than any other person, highlighted the dilemma Eisenhower faced—Eisenhower could admit responsibility for the U-2 flight, and likely ruin any chances for détente at the Paris Summit, or he could continue to deny knowledge and indicate that he did not control his own administration.

When Khrushchev heard about America's NASA cover story, he developed a political trap for Eisenhower. He announced that a spy plane had been shot down in Soviet territory, but he did not reveal that the pilot of this aircraft had been found and that he was alive. This led US officials to believe they could continue with their cover story that the crashed U-2 was a weather research aircraft. Building on the lie that the pilot had experienced oxygen difficulties while flying over Turkey, they declared that the pilot may have passed out and the aircraft continued on autopilot into Soviet airspace. To bolster the story, they grounded all U-2 aircraft for inspection of oxygen systems.

On 7 May, Khrushchev sprang his trap and announced:

I must tell you a secret. When I made my first report I deliberately did not say that the pilot was alive and well ... and now just look how many silly things the Americans have said.

To buttress his claims, Khrushchev released photos of U-2 systems.

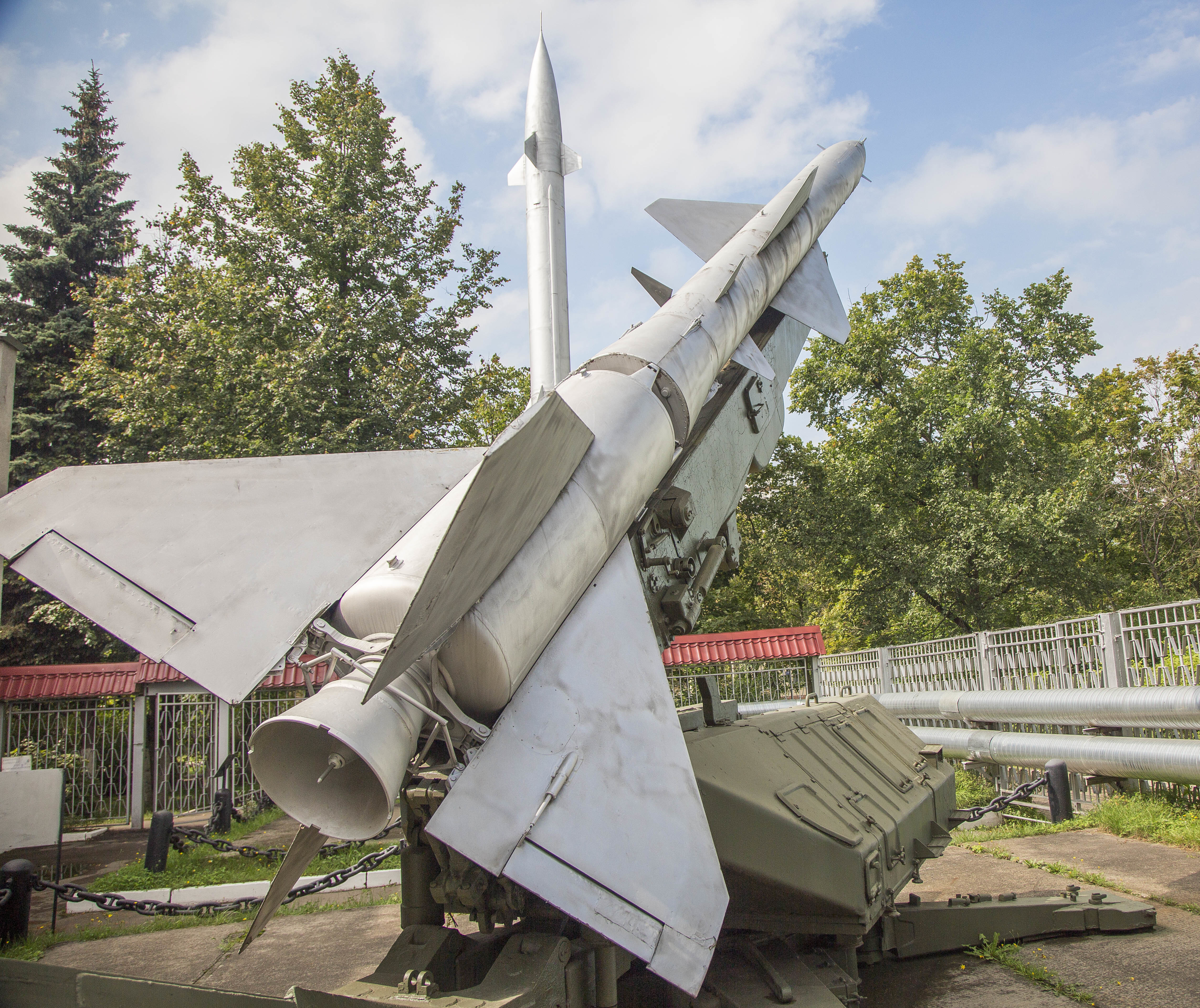
Soviet C-75 (SA-2) SAM launcher used to shoot down Gary Powers' U-2, on display at the Air Defense Forces Museum in Balachinka district, Zarya village

Khrushchev attempted to allow Eisenhower to save face, and possibly to salvage the peace summit to some degree, by laying the blame not on Eisenhower himself, but on Director of Central Intelligence Allen Dulles and the CIA. Khrushchev said that anyone wishing to understand the U-2's mission should "seek a reply from Allen Dulles, at whose instructions the American aircraft flew over the Soviet Union". On 9 May, the Soviet premier told US ambassador Thompson that he "could not help but suspect that someone had launched this operation with the deliberate intent of spoiling the summit meeting". Thompson also wrote in his diplomatic cable that Khrushchev suspected it was Allen Dulles, and that Khrushchev had heard about Senator Mansfield's remarks that Eisenhower did not control his own administration.

Upon receiving this cable, Eisenhower, who frequently was very animated, was quiet and depressed. The only words he said to his secretary were, "I would like to resign." Meanwhile, the domestic pressure continued to mount. Eisenhower then accepted Dulles's argument that the congressional leadership needed to be briefed on the U-2 missions from the last four years. Dulles told the legislature that all U-2 flights were used for aerial espionage and had been flown pursuant to "presidential directives". Still, Dulles played down Eisenhower's direct role in approving every previous U-2 flight.

The next day, on 10 May, House Appropriations Chair Clarence Cannon, not President Eisenhower, revealed the true nature of the U-2 mission. He told an open session of the House of Representatives that the U-2 was a CIA aircraft engaged in aerial espionage over the Soviet Union. Cannon said,

Mr. Chairman, on May 1 the Soviet Government captured, 1300 miles inside the boundaries of the Russian Empire, an American plane, operated by an American pilot, under the direction and control of the US Central Intelligence Agency, and is now holding both the plane and the pilot. The plane was on an espionage mission ... the activity ... [was] under the aegis of the Commander in Chief of the Armed Forces of the United States, for whom all members of the subcommittee have the highest regard and in whose military capacity they have the utmost confidence.

At the end of Cannon's speech, Democrats and Republicans uncharacteristically rose to their feet to applaud.

Still, Eisenhower faced criticism in the press for not controlling his own administration, as Cannon's speech only said the mission was "under the aegis of" the president, not "directed by". Press reports were creating a belief in the public that Eisenhower had lost control, which Eisenhower would not let stand. Knowing that he was jeopardizing the Paris Peace Summit, Eisenhower decided to reveal the aerial espionage program and his direct role in it, an unprecedented move for a US president. His speech on 11 May revolved around four main points: the need for intelligence gathering activities; the nature of intelligence gathering activities; how intelligence activities should be viewed (as distasteful, but vital); and finally that Americans should not be distracted from the real problems of the day. Eisenhower closed passionately by reacting to the Soviet claim that the US acted provocatively and said: "They had better look at their own [espionage] record." As he finished, he told reporters he was still going to the Paris Peace Summit.

Defense analyst Richard Best, for the Congressional Research Service, writes: "Many observers believed that when President Eisenhower in 1960 accepted responsibility for U-2 overflights of the Soviet Union, he made reaching agreements with Moscow much more difficult; had he blamed the flights on the Pentagon or the CIA, Khrushchev arguably might not have felt forced to react so strongly even though he might not believe the denials. Such reasoning, while constrained, is hardly unusual. It is easier for a President to deal with foreign leaders who are known to have committed violent acts, but have never admitted having done so, than to meet formally with those who have acknowledged 'unacceptable' behavior."

A large part of the wreck as well as many items from Powers' survival pack are on display at the Central Armed Forces Museum in Moscow. A small piece of the U-2 was returned to the United States and is on display at the National Cryptologic Museum.

== Aftermath ==
=== Contemporary reactions and effect on the Four Powers Summit ===
The summit was attended by Eisenhower, Khrushchev, French President Charles de Gaulle, and British Prime Minister Harold Macmillan. It was the first conference to be attended by both Soviet and Western leaders in five years. However, prospects for constructive dialogue were dashed by the explosive controversy surrounding the U-2 flight over Soviet territory.

Although the Four Powers Summit was the first meeting between western and Soviet leaders in five years when it was held, the mood was optimistic that there could be an easing of tensions between the Soviet Union and the United States. In an effort to present a less hostile, more cordial Soviet Union, Khrushchev publicly advocated a policy of "peaceful coexistence with the United States". The May Day celebrations on 1 May of that year were marked by this newfound cooperative spirit. Absent were the militarized symbols of previous parades, such as artillery and armor. Instead, there were children, white doves, and athletes. But the reaction of the Soviet government to the spy plane incident and the response from the United States doomed any potential meaningful peace agreement.

In the days directly leading up to the conference, tensions increased dramatically between the United States and the Soviet Union over the U-2 incident. At this point in the negotiations, the hardliners of the Soviet government were applying heavy pressure to Khrushchev. In the weeks leading up to the summit there had been a revitalization of anti-American sentiment within the Kremlin, with the Soviets blocking a planned trip to Washington DC of a Soviet air marshal, inviting Chinese communist leader Mao Zedong to Moscow, and launching an anti-American press campaign designed to critique "American aggression". At this time east and west were divided about how to move forward in Berlin, and the American press characterized Khrushchev's decision to emphasize the U-2 incident at the summit as an attempt to gain leverage on this issue.

The summit itself did not last long, with talks only beginning on 15 May and ending on 16 May. Both Eisenhower and Khrushchev gave statements on the 16th. Khrushchev blasted the United States on the U-2 incident. He pointed out that the policy of secret spying was one of mistrust and that the incident had doomed the summit before it even began. He expected the United States and Eisenhower to condemn the spying and pledge to end further reconnaissance missions.

At the summit, after Khrushchev had blown Eisenhower's cover, Eisenhower did not deny that the aircraft had been spying on Soviet military installations but contended that the action was not aggressive but defensive. He argued that the current state of international relations was not one in which peaceful coexistence was an already established fact. The policy of the United States towards the Soviet Union at that time was defensive and cautionary. Eisenhower also made the point that dialogue at the Four Powers Summit was the type of international negotiation that could lead to a relationship between the United States and the Soviet Union where there would be no need to spy on each other. Eisenhower also laid out a plan for an international agreement that authorized the UN to "inspect" any nations willing to submit to its authority for signs of increased militarization and aggressive action. He stated that the United States would be more than willing to submit to such an inspection by the UN and that he hoped to circumvent the spying controversy with this alternative international surveillance agreement.

The meeting during which both parties made their statements lasted just over three hours. During this time Khrushchev rescinded an invitation he had earlier given to Eisenhower to visit the Soviet Union. After the meeting's failure, West German chancellor Konrad Adenauer supported Eisenhower. At the final press conference, in response to disapproving booing from the audience, Khrushchev said:

I've already been informed that Chancellor Adenauer sent the ones we didn't finish off at Stalingrad, who had marched into the Soviet Union, into its borders and had messed with us, and there we had messed with them instantly so that we drove them three meters into the ground, you see. So, gentlemen, keep booing and be careful. We didn't finish you off at Stalingrad, in Ukraine, in Belarus. If you keep booing us and prepare to attack again, we'll boo you so hard you wouldn't boo anymore.

According to American broadcast journalist Walter Cronkite, Khrushchev would go on to say that this incident was the beginning of his decline in power as party chairman, perhaps because he seemed unable to negotiate the international arena and the communist hardliners at home. The collapse of the summit also saw an increased tension between the Soviets and the Americans in the years to come. After this debacle, the arms race accelerated and any considerations for negotiations were dashed for the immediate future.

=== Consequences of the incident ===
As a result of the spy plane incident and the attempted cover-up, the Four Power Paris Summit was not completed. At the beginning of the talks on 16 May, there was still hope that the two sides could come together even after the events that took place earlier in May, but Eisenhower refused to apologize and Khrushchev left the summit one day after it had begun. Even though Eisenhower refused to apologize, he did admit that the flights were "suspended and would not resume". Some public opinion was that Khrushchev had overreacted to the event in an attempt to strengthen his own position, and for that, he was the one to blame for the collapse of the Four Power Paris Summit.

Before the U-2 incident Khrushchev and Eisenhower had been getting along well and the summit was going to be an opportunity for the two sides to come together. Also, Eisenhower had been looking forward to a visit to the Soviet Union and was very upset when his invitation was retracted. The two sides were going to discuss topics such as nuclear arms reduction and also how to deal with increasing tensions surrounding Berlin. According to Eisenhower, had it not been for the U-2 incident, the summit and his visit to the Soviet Union could have greatly helped Soviet and American relations.

The Soviet Union convened a meeting of the United Nations Security Council on 23 May to tell their side of the story. The meetings continued for four days with other allegations of spying being exchanged, as well as recriminations over the Paris Summit, and a US offer of an "open skies" proposal to allow reciprocal flights over one another's territory, at the end of which the Soviet Union overwhelmingly lost a vote on a concise resolution which would have condemned the incursions and requested the US to prevent their recurrence.

The incident also reverberated around the world. For example, in Japan, the incident contributed to the growth of the ongoing Anpo protests against the US-Japan Security Treaty (known as "Anpo" in Japanese) which allowed the United States to maintain military bases on Japanese soil. The Japanese government was forced to admit that U-2 planes were also based at US bases in Japan, which meant that Japan might be subject to attack should a war break out between the United States and the Soviet Union. Accordingly, when the U-2 revelations came to light, Japanese protesters felt added urgency in their drive to eliminate the treaty and rid Japan of US military bases.

=== Fallout in Pakistan and Norway ===
Pakistan

The U-2 incident severely compromised Pakistan's security and dented relations with the United States. After the incident, Nikita Khrushchev threatened to drop a nuclear bomb on Peshawar, thus warning Pakistan that it had become a target of Soviet nuclear forces. General Khalid Mahmud Arif of the Pakistan Army stated that "Pakistan felt deceived because the US had kept her in the dark about such clandestine spy operations launched from Pakistan's territory", although Pakistan's president Muhammad Ayub Khan may have known about the operations. Khan visited the USSR in 1965 and apologized for the incident. When Khan invited Soviet foreign minister Andrei Gromyko to visit Pakistan, pointing out he'd never visited the country, the latter sarcastically replied "I always keep ahead of the U-2".

The communications wing at Badaber was formally closed down on 7 January 1970. Further, the Senate Foreign Relations Committee held a lengthy inquiry into the U-2 incident.

Norway

In Norway, authorities gave permission for the United States to have a temporary base in Bodø during 1960; the condition was that U-2 missions were only to fly over international waters; the request from the US was made to chief of intelligence Vilhelm Evang, then passed on to defense minister Nils Handal, then passed on to "regjeringens sikkerhetsutvalg ('the Cabinet's security committee') where prime minister Gerhardsen and foreign minister Lange" were members.

In the Norwegian Armed Forces, the U-2 incident caused "dirty laundry to be aired", but no blame was assigned; as of 2022, the archives from 1960 of Norwegian Intelligence Service have not been declassified.

=== Pilot's fate ===
Upon his capture, Gary Powers told his Soviet captors what his mission had been and why he had been in Soviet airspace. He did this in accordance with orders that he had received before he went on his mission. Powers pleaded guilty and was convicted of espionage on 19 August and sentenced to three years imprisonment and seven years of hard labor. He served one year and nine months of the sentence before being exchanged for Rudolf Abel on 10 February 1962. The exchange occurred on the Glienicke Bridge connecting Potsdam, East Germany, to West Berlin.

=== New tactics and technology ===
The incident showed that even high-altitude aircraft were vulnerable to Soviet surface-to-air missiles. As a result, the United States began emphasizing high-speed, low-level flights for its previously high altitude B-47, B-52 and B-58 bombers, and began developing the supersonic F-111, which would include an FB-111A variant for the Strategic Air Command. The Corona spy satellite project was accelerated. The CIA also accelerated the development of the Lockheed A-12 OXCART supersonic spyplane that first flew in 1962 and later began developing the Lockheed D-21 unmanned drone.

As a result of the capture, the Russians reverse-engineered the U-2 and ended up producing the Beriev S-13, but development was cancelled after Powers was released.

== Later versions ==
The original consensus about the cause of the U-2 incident was that the spy plane had been shot down by one of a salvo of 14 Soviet S-75 missiles. This story was originated by Oleg Penkovsky, a GRU agent who spied for MI6. In 2010, CIA documents were released indicating that "top US officials never believed Powers's account of his fateful flight because it appeared to be directly contradicted by a report from the National Security Agency" which alleged that the U-2 had descended from 20,000 to 10,000 metres (65,000 to 34,000 ft) before changing course and disappearing from radar. One more recent reading of the NSA's story is that they mistakenly tracked the descent of a MiG-19 piloted by Sr. Lt. Sergei Safronov.

=== Igor Mentyukov ===
In 1996, Soviet pilot Captain Igor Mentyukov claimed that, at 19,800 metres (65,000 ft) altitude, under orders to ram the intruder, he had caught the U-2 in the slipstream of his unarmed Sukhoi Su-9, causing the U-2 to flip over and break its wings. The salvo of missiles had indeed scored a hit, downing a pursuing MiG-19, not the U-2. Mentyukov said that if a missile had hit the U-2, its pilot would not have lived.

Though the normal Su-9 service ceiling was 16,800 metres (55,000 ft), Mentyukov's aircraft had been modified to achieve higher altitudes, having its weapons removed. With no weapons, the only attack option open to him was aerial ramming. Mentyukov asserted that Soviet generals concealed these facts to avoid challenging Nikita Khrushchev's faith in the efficiency of Soviet air defenses.

=== Selmer Nilsen ===
In 1981, Selmer Nilsen, a Norwegian convicted for spying for the Soviet Union, claimed in his book 'I Was a Russian Spy' that Powers's U-2 had actually been sabotaged. He alleged that a bomb had been placed in the tail of the aircraft by two Soviet spies disguised as mechanics at a Turkish airfield. He claimed to have been told this by Soviet officials shortly after the incident. This may have been a contemporary 1962 theory also. Ian Fleming, writing his 1963 James Bond novel, On Her Majesty's Secret Service, had M mention to Bond during a briefing that "a plastic explosives expert was working for the KGB in Turkey. If it's true that the U-2 that fellow Powers was piloting was brought down by delayed charges and not by rockets, it may be this man is implicated."

=== Fletcher Prouty ===
Fletcher Prouty was an Air Force officer who coordinated covert actions between the Joint Chiefs of Staff and the Central Intelligence Agency. In the 1990s, he gave an interview suggesting the incident was an elaborate disinformation operation with a secondary political goal of sabotaging peace talks. Prouty noted the U-2 did not carry the advanced camera, that the U-2 had previously crashed and had been rebuilt by Lockheed to non-standard specifications, and the hydrogen tank had only been half-filled, meaning it would have run out of fuel over the Soviet Union. The effect of such an operation would be to mislead the Soviet Union about the aircraft's capabilities such as camera resolution.

== Film ==
In 2015, the Steven Spielberg feature film Bridge of Spies was released, which dramatized James B. Donovan (Tom Hanks)'s negotiations for Powers's release, but took certain liberties with what really happened. For instance, Powers is shown being tortured by the Soviets, when in reality he was treated well by his captors and spent much of his time doing handicrafts.

In January 2016, the BBC magazine produced photographs from the time and an interview with Powers's son.

== See also ==
- United States aerial reconnaissance of the Soviet Union
- Second-term curse
- Attacks on the United States

General:

- Cold War (1953–1962)
- Operation Sandblast

Analogous incidents:

- 1960 RB-47 shootdown incident
- Cuban Missile Crisis
- Hainan Island incident
- Iran–US RQ-170 incident
- Korean Air Lines Flight 007
- Korean Air Lines Flight 902
- Rudolf Anderson
- 2023 Chinese balloon incident
