= Zelimkhan Mutsoev =

Russian politician (born 1959)

- Зелимхан Муцоев
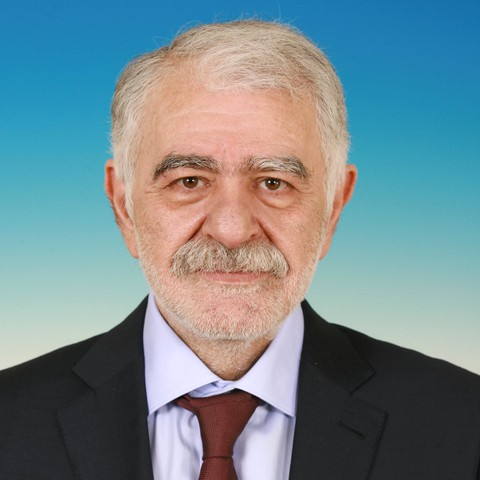
- official portrait, c. 2021

Member of the State Duma for Sverdlovsk Oblast
- Incumbent
- Assumed office 5 October 2016
- Preceded by: constituency re-established
- Constituency: Pervouralsk (No. 172)
- In office 18 January 2000 – 24 December 2007
- Preceded by: Gennady Burbulis
- Succeeded by: constituencies abolished
- Constituency: Pervouralsk (No. 166) (Note: Renumbered to 173 in 2016.)

Member of the State Duma (Party List Seat)
- In office 20 June 2012 – 5 October 2016
- In office 24 December 2007 – 21 December 2011

Personal details
- Born: 13 October 1959 (age 67) Tbilisi, Georgian SSR, USSR
- Party: United Russia (from 2006); NPRF (until 2006)
- Spouse: Olga Valeryevna Sergeeva
- Children: 4 sons, 1 daughter
- Education: Volgograd Civil Engineering Institute

Zelimkhan Alikoevich Mutsoev (Russian: Зелимхан Аликоевич Муцоев; born on October 13, 1959, in Tbilisi) is a Russian-Yazidi political figure and a deputy of the 3rd, 4th, 5th, 6th, 7th, and 8th State Dumas.

In the early 1990s, Mutsoev moved to Moscow. From 1991 to 1993, he was the director of the Moscow branch of the Association for Foreign Economic Relations of Small and Medium Enterprises, which was engaged in supplying of goods in the USSR. In 1998, Mutsoev engaged in business and became a co-owner of the Pervouralsk New Pipe Plant. In December 1999, he was elected deputy of the 3rd State Duma. In 2003 and 2007, he was re-elected for the 4th and 5th State Dumas. In the 2011 election, the United Russia list lost 77 seats, putting Mutsoev out of parliament. However, in May 2012 Deputy Ekaterina Semenova, also of United Russia, resigned her seat to join the Moscow Oblast government, and the Central Election Commission approved the transfer of her mandate to Mutsoev on 20 June the same year.

In 2016 and 2021, he was re-elected for the 7th and 8th State Dumas, respectively.

In 2008, the owners of the hotel "Rus" in Kyiv accused Mutsoev of illegally taking their property. Even though he rejected all the accusations, later the documents were revealed that proved the involvement of the Mutsoev family in the raider seizure of the Ukrainian hotel.

Zelimkhan Mutsoev is #1741 on Forbes' 2015 Billionaires list and in 2016, he took 86th place in the Forbes ranking of 200 wealthiest businessmen in Russia.

== Awards ==
- Order of Friendship
- Order "For Merit to the Fatherland"
- Order of Honour (Russia)
- Order of Courage
