= Degtyarsk =

Town in Sverdlovsk Oblast, Russia

Degtyarsk Дегтярск
- Town
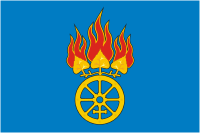
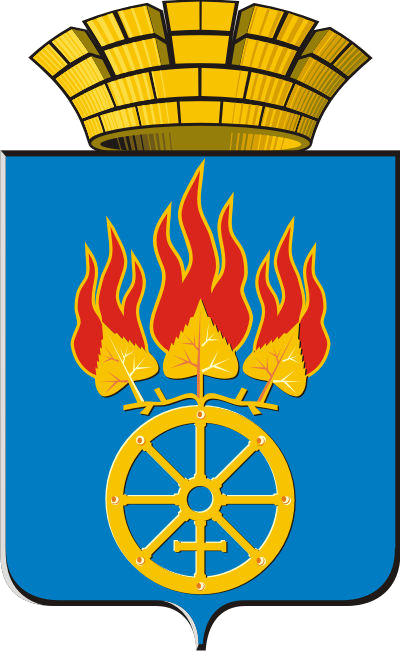
- Flag Coat of arms
- Interactive map of Degtyarsk
- Location of Degtyarsk Degtyarsk (Sverdlovsk Oblast)
- Coordinates: 56°42′N 60°07′E
- Country: Russia
- Federal subject: Sverdlovsk Oblast
- Founded: 18th century
- Town status since: 1954
- Elevation: 370 m (1,210 ft)

Population (2010 Census)
  - Total: 15,522
  - Estimate (2025): 14,831 (−4.5%)

Administrative status
  - Subordinated to: Town of Revda

Municipal status
  - Urban okrug: Degtyarsk Urban Okrug
  - Capital of: Degtyarsk Urban Okrug
- Time zone: UTC+5 (MSK+2)
- Postal code: 623270–623272
- OKTMO ID: 65736000001
- Website: www.degtyarsk.ru

Degtyarsk (Russian: Дегтя́рск) is a town under the administrative jurisdiction of the Town of Revda in Sverdlovsk Oblast, Russia, located on the Vyazovka River (right tributary of the Chusovaya), 35 kilometers (22 mi) west of Yekaterinburg, the administrative center of the oblast. Population: 15,522 (2010 census); 15,869 (2002 census); 18,394 (1989 Soviet census).

== History ==
It was founded in the 18th century; town status was granted to it in 1954.

The town is notable as the site of 1960 U-2 incident, where an American Lockheed U-2 reconnaissance aircraft (and pursuing Soviet MiG-19 'Farmer') were shot down by S-75 Dvina (SA-2 'Guideline') surface-to-air missiles.

== Administrative and municipal status ==
Within the framework of the administrative divisions, Degtyarsk and ten rural localities are subordinated to the Town of Revda—an administrative unit with the status equal to that of the districts. As a municipal division, Degtyarsk, together with three rural localities, is incorporated as Degtyarsk Urban Okrug. Revda and the other seven rural localities are incorporated separately as Revda Urban Okrug.
