= Saryshaghan =

Saryshaghan kaz. Сарышаған, Saryşağan Saryşağan
- Town
- Location in Karagandy Province, Aqtogay, Kazakhstan
- Coordinates: 46°07′N 73°37′E
- Country: Kazakhstan
- Region: Karaganda Region
- Founded: 1956
  - Summer (DST): UTC+6 (UTC+6)
- Postal code: 100314

Saryshaghan (Kazakh: Сарышаған, Saryşağan) is a town in Kazakhstan located on the coast of Lake Balkhash at Latitude (DMS): 46° 7' 9 N Longitude (DMS): 73° 37' 9 E in Karaganda Region. Its population is estimated at 11,000 inhabitants.

Sary Shagan is a site of the major anti-ballistic missile defense test range in the Soviet Union. The first non-nuclear interception of a ballistic missile warhead by a missile was accomplished there on 4 March 1961.

== History ==
On July 16, 1954, by the Decree of the Presidium of the Supreme Council of the Kazakh SSR, the Sary-Shagan village council was formed as part of the Shet District with its center in the settlement at the Sary-Shagan railway station, including settlements at the Kara-Zhingil and Naualy railway stations and transferring the village council to the administrative subordination to the Balkhash City Council.

Since 1956 it has been an urban-type settlement.

== Climate ==
Saryshaghan has a cold desert climate (Köppen: BWk) with very cold winters and hot summers.

Climate data for Saryshagan (1991–2020)
Month	Jan	Feb	Mar	Apr	May	Jun	Jul	Aug	Sep	Oct	Nov	Dec	Year
Mean daily maximum °C (°F)	−8.6 (16.5)	−6.0 (21.2)	2.7 (36.9)	15.3 (59.5)	23.1 (73.6)	29.1 (84.4)	30.5 (86.9)	28.8 (83.8)	21.9 (71.4)	13.3 (55.9)	3.3 (37.9)	−5.0 (23.0)	12.4 (54.3)
Daily mean °C (°F)	−12.7 (9.1)	−10.7 (12.7)	−2.1 (28.2)	9.5 (49.1)	17.2 (63.0)	23.2 (73.8)	24.9 (76.8)	23.0 (73.4)	16.1 (61.0)	7.9 (46.2)	−1.0 (30.2)	−9.0 (15.8)	7.2 (45.0)
Mean daily minimum °C (°F)	−16.6 (2.1)	−14.9 (5.2)	−6.1 (21.0)	4.5 (40.1)	11.4 (52.5)	17.2 (63.0)	19.0 (66.2)	17.0 (62.6)	10.1 (50.2)	2.8 (37.0)	−4.8 (23.4)	−12.6 (9.3)	2.2 (36.0)
Average precipitation mm (inches)	12.9 (0.51)	10.2 (0.40)	12.1 (0.48)	13.4 (0.53)	13.5 (0.53)	14.0 (0.55)	13.6 (0.54)	7.9 (0.31)	3.9 (0.15)	7.9 (0.31)	13.8 (0.54)	11.5 (0.45)	134.7 (5.30)
Average precipitation days (≥ 1.0 mm)	4.1	3.3	3.3	3.1	3.0	2.7	3.2	1.8	1.2	2.1	3.7	3.9	35.4
Source: NOAA
