= Revda, Sverdlovsk Oblast =

Town in Sverdlovsk Oblast, Russia

Revda Ревда
- Town
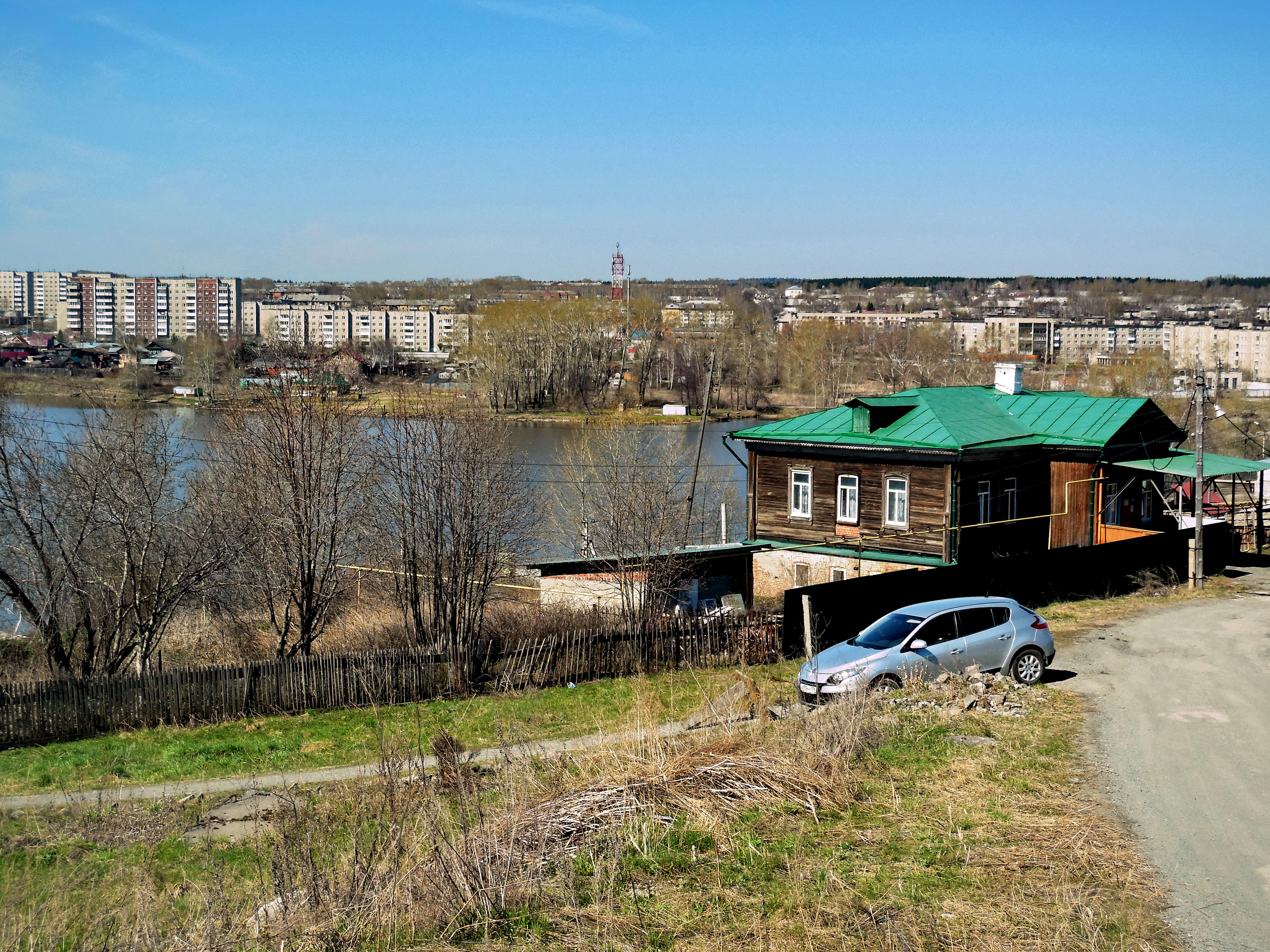
- Revda

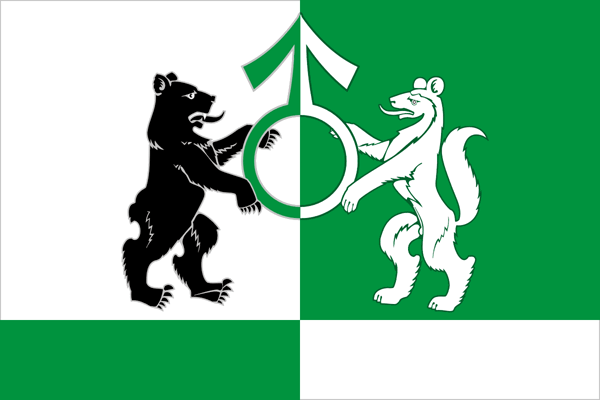
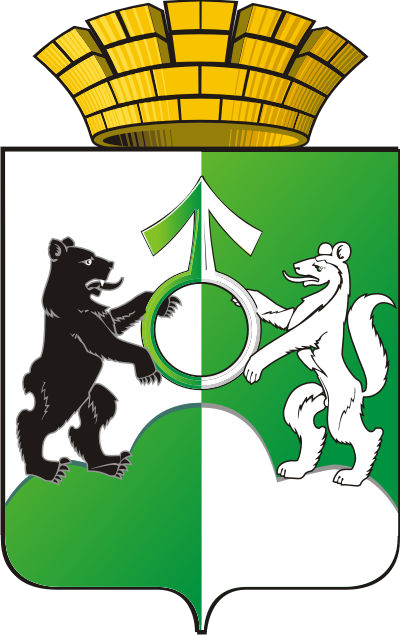
- Flag Coat of arms
- Interactive map of Revda
- Location of Revda Revda (Sverdlovsk Oblast)
- Coordinates: 56°48′19″N 59°55′42″E
- Country: Russia
- Federal subject: Sverdlovsk Oblast
- Founded: 1734
- Town status since: 1935
- Elevation: 320 m (1,050 ft)

Population (2010 Census)
  - Total: 61,875
  - Estimate (2025): 58,831 (−4.9%)
  - Rank: 258th in 2010

Administrative status
  - Subordinated to: Town of Revda
  - Capital of: Town of Revda

Municipal status
  - Urban okrug: Revda Urban Okrug
  - Capital of: Revda Urban Okrug
- Time zone: UTC+5 (MSK+2)
- Postal code: 623280–623287
- OKTMO ID: 65719000001

Revda (Russian: Ревда́) is a town in Sverdlovsk Oblast, Russia. Population: 59,521 (2023); 61,875 (2010 census); 62,667 (2002 census); 65,757 (1989 Soviet census).

== Geography ==
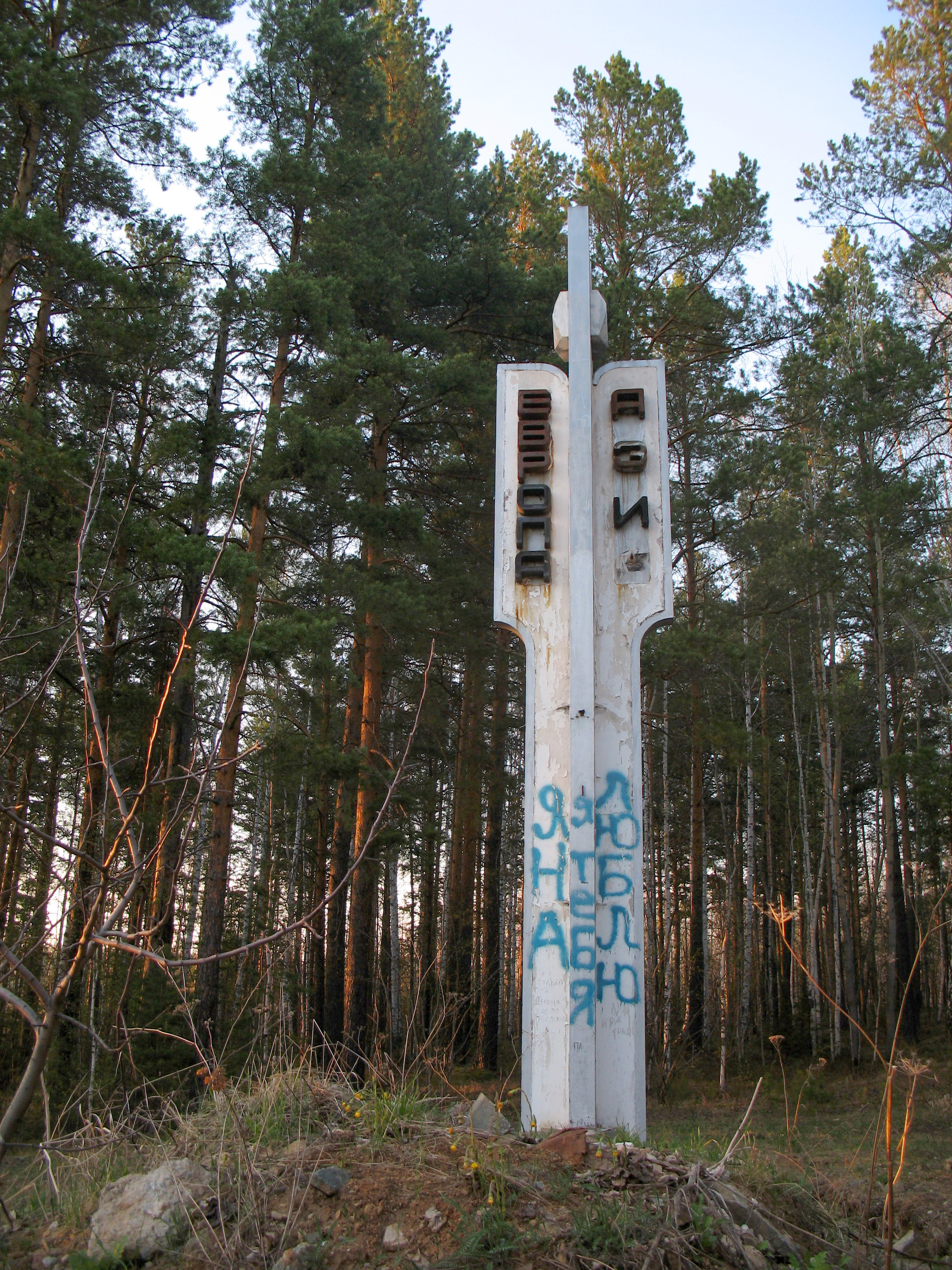
monument between the cities of Revda and Degtyarsk

The Europe-Asia border runs through Revda.

== History ==
It was founded in 1734 and was granted town status in 1935.

== Administrative and municipal status ==
Within the framework of the administrative divisions, it is, together with the town of Degtyarsk and ten rural localities, incorporated as the Town of Revda—an administrative unit with the status equal to that of the districts. As a municipal division, Revda and seven rural localities are incorporated as Revda Urban Okrug. The town of Degtyarsk, together with three other rural localities, is incorporated separately as Degtyarsk Urban Okrug.

== Culture ==
A local museum houses replicas of border markers on various road and highways in the Urals

== Radio Broadcasting ==
Radio Rossii/GTRK Ural 89.9 MHz (Pervouralsk) Radio Record 90.5 MHz (Pervouralsk) Radio Mayama 94 MHz Radio Dacha 94.5 MHz Radio Miliceyskaya volna 95.1 MHz (Pervouralsk) Mayak 97.2 MHz (Pervouralsk) Interra FM 97.6 MHz (Pervouralsk) Gold FM 98.1 MHz (Pervouralsk) Radio Pilot 100.4 MHz (Yekaterinburg) Dzhem FM 102.5 MHz (Yekaterinburg) Radio C 103.7 MHz (Yekaterinburg)
