= Staroutkinsk =

Work settlement in Sverdlovsk Oblast, Russia

Staroutkinsk Староуткинск
- Work settlement
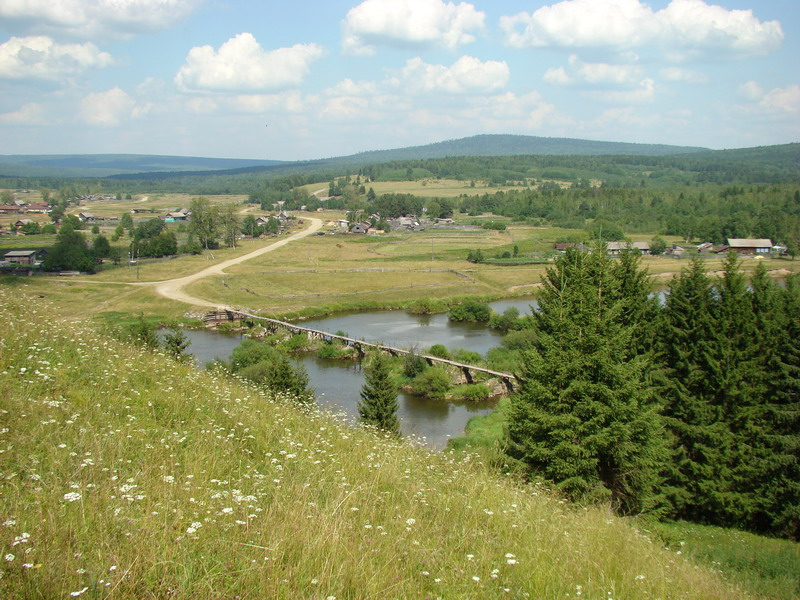

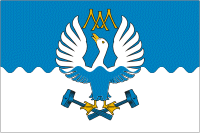
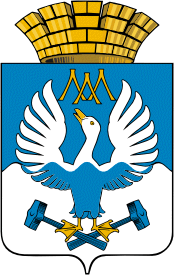
- Flag Coat of arms
- Interactive map of Staroutkinsk
- Location of Staroutkinsk Staroutkinsk (Sverdlovsk Oblast)
- Coordinates: 57°13′40″N 59°20′00″E
- Country: Russia
- Federal subject: Sverdlovsk Oblast
- Administrative district: Shalinsky District
- Urban-type settlement status since: 1933

Population (2010 Census)
  - Total: 2,969
  - Estimate (2025): 2,462 (−17.1%)

Municipal status
  - Urban okrug: Staroutkinsk Urban Okrug
  - Capital of: Staroutkinsk Urban Okrug
- Time zone: UTC+5 (MSK+2)
- Postal code: 623036
- OKTMO ID: 65766000051
- Website: www.staroutkinsk.ru

Staroutkinsk (Russian: Староуткинск) is an urban locality (a work settlement) in Shalinsky District of Sverdlovsk Oblast, Russia. Population: 2,969 (2010 census); 3,241 (2002 census); 4,420 (1989 Soviet census).

== History ==
Staroutkinsk was founded in 1729. Work settlement status was granted to it in 1933.

== Administrative and municipal status ==
Within the framework of administrative divisions, Staroutkinsk is subordinated to Shalinsky District. As a municipal division, the work settlement of Staroutkinsk together with three rural localities in Shalinsky District is incorporated as Staroutkinsk Urban Okrug.
