= Shalinsky District, Sverdlovsk Oblast =

District in Sverdlovsk Oblast, Russia

Shalinsky District Шалинский район (Russian)
- District
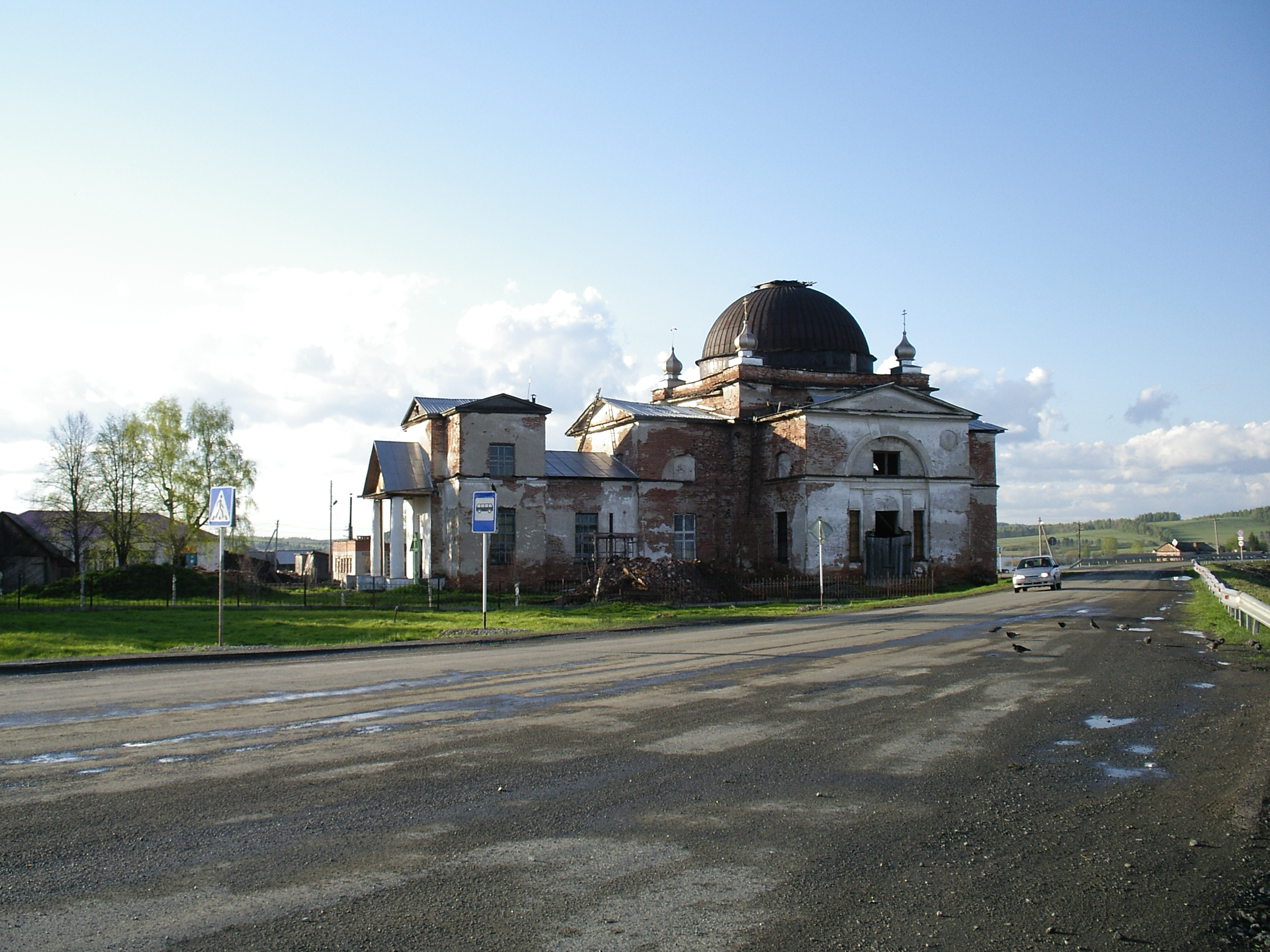
- Sylva's Church, Shalinsky District

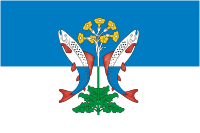
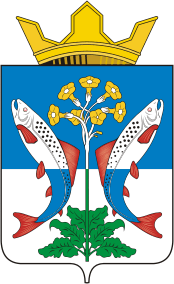
- Flag Coat of arms
- Location of Shalinsky District in Sverdlovsk Oblast
- Coordinates: 57.267°N 58.827°E
- Country: Russia
- Federal subject: Sverdlovsk Oblast
- Established: 1932
- Administrative center: Shalya

Area
  - Total: 4,852 km^{2} (1,873 sq mi)

Population (2010 Census)
  - Total: 23,834
  - Density: 4.912/km^{2} (12.72/sq mi)
  - Urban: 39.4%
  - Rural: 60.6%

Administrative structure
  - Administrative divisions: 2 Work settlements, 9 Selsoviets
  - Inhabited localities: 2 urban-type settlements, 41 rural localities

Municipal structure
  - Municipally incorporated as: Shalinsky Urban Okrug
- Website: http://www.shalya.ru/

Shalinsky District (Russian: Шалинский райо́н) is an administrative district (raion), one of the thirty in Sverdlovsk Oblast, Russia. The area of the district is 4,852 square kilometers (1,873 sq mi). Its administrative center is the urban locality (a work settlement) of Shalya. Population: 23,834 (2010 Census); 26,019 (2002 census); 31,384 (1989 Soviet census). The population of Shalya accounts for 27.0% of the district's total population.

== Administrative and municipal status ==
Within the framework of administrative divisions, Shalinsky District is one of the thirty in the oblast. The work settlement of Shalya serves as its administrative center.

As a municipal division, the territory of the district is split between two municipal formations—Shalinsky Urban Okrug, to which the work settlement of Shalya and thirty-eight of the administrative district's rural localities belong, and Staroutkinsk Urban Okrug, which covers the rest of the administrative district's territory, including the work settlement of Staroutkinsk and three remaining rural localities.
