= Bisert =

Work settlement in Sverdlovsk Oblast, Russia

Bisert Бисерть
- Work settlement
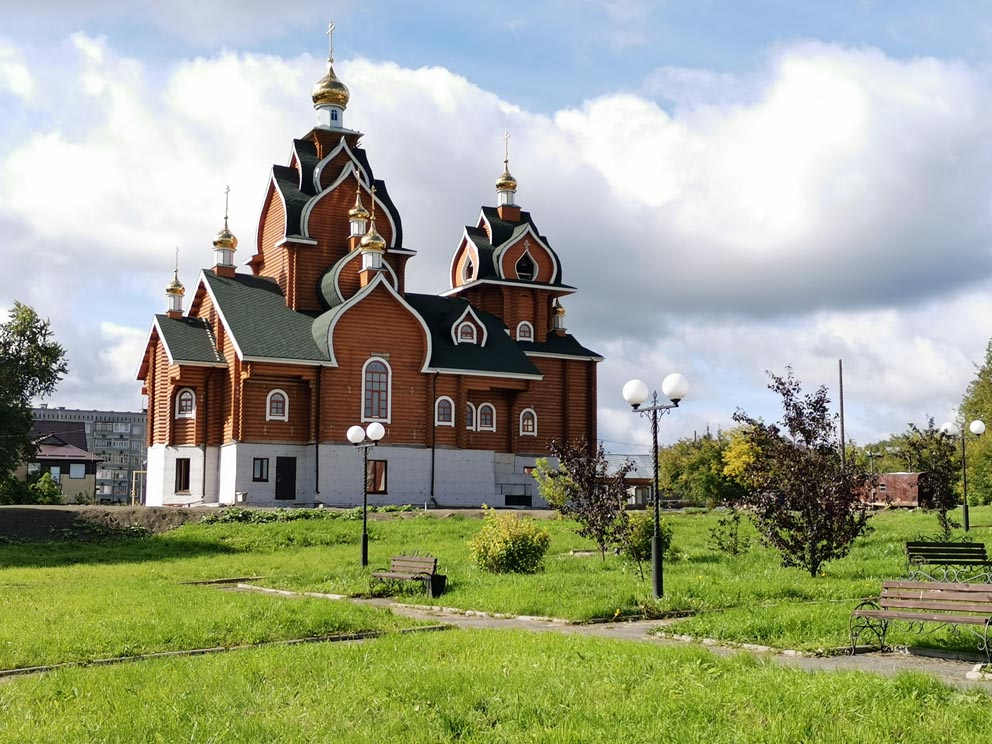

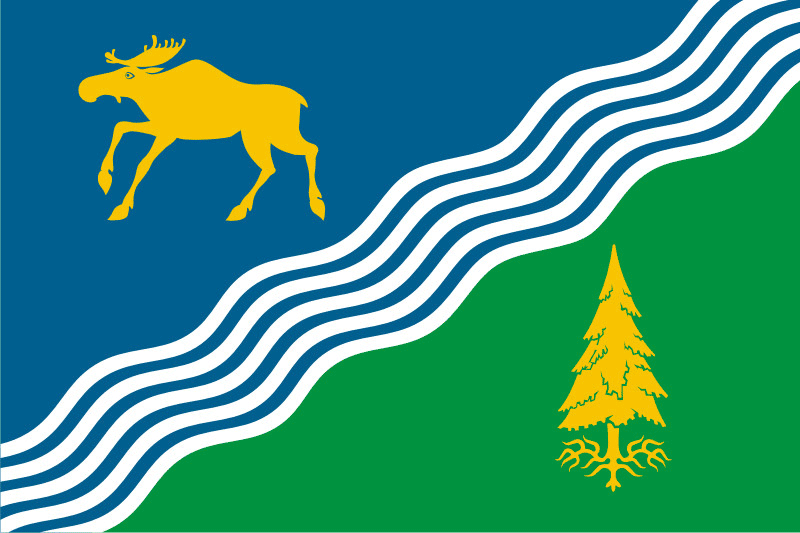
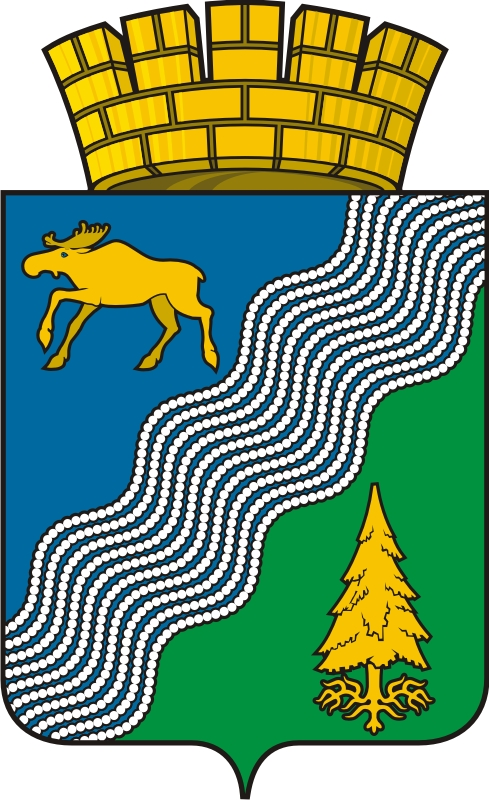
- Flag Coat of arms
- Interactive map of Bisert
- Location of Bisert Bisert (Sverdlovsk Oblast)
- Coordinates: 56°51′39″N 59°04′12″E
- Country: Russia
- Federal subject: Sverdlovsk Oblast
- Administrative district: Nizhneserginsky District
- Founded: 1735
- Urban-type settlement status since: 1942
- Elevation: 292 m (958 ft)

Population (2010 Census)
  - Total: 10,233
  - Estimate (2025): 9,005 (−12%)

Municipal status
  - Urban okrug: Bisertsky Urban Okrug
  - Capital of: Bisertsky Urban Okrug
- Time zone: UTC+5 (MSK+2)
- Postal code: 623050
- OKTMO ID: 65759000051

Bisert (Russian: Бисе́рть) is an urban locality (a work settlement) in Nizhneserginsky District of Sverdlovsk Oblast, Russia. Population: 10,233 (2010 census); 11,262 (2002 census); 12,646 (1989 Soviet census).

== History ==
On November 5 (16), 1761, the first hammer for forging iron was put into operation at the Bisert Ironworks, built by G. A. Demidov. Since that time, the existence of a plant in Bisert began.

Since 1923, Bisert was administratively subordinate to the Yekaterinburg District of the Ural Region. At that time, the Bisert district was formed with the center in the village of Bisert. In 1942, Bisert became a workers' settlement. In 1944-1959 it was the center of the Bisert region. On November 10, 1996, the municipality was included in the state register of municipalities of the Sverdlovsk region.

On July 21, 2004, the Regional Law No. 34-03 “On Establishing the Boundaries of the Bisertskoye Municipal Formation and Giving it the Status of an Urban District” established the boundaries of the municipal formation endowed with the status of an urban district. On June 9, 2005, by the decision of the Duma of the municipal formation Bisertskoye No. 18, the charter of the Bisert city district was approved. Since October 1, 2017, according to the regional law N 35-OZ, the status has been changed from a working settlement to an urban-type settlement[4]

== Administrative and municipal status ==
Within the framework of the administrative divisions, it is subordinated to Nizhneserginsky District. As a municipal division, the work settlement of Bisert, together with four rural localities of Nizhneserginsky District, are not a part of Nizhneserginsky Municipal District and are incorporated separately as Bisertsky Urban Okrug.
